= List of flood basalt provinces =

Continental flood basalts and oceanic plateaus

Representative continental flood basalts (also known as traps) and oceanic plateaus, together forming a listing of large igneous provinces:

Era	Period (Note: Paleontologists often refer to faunal stages rather than geologic (geological) periods. The stage nomenclature is quite complex. For an excellent time-ordered list of faunal stages, see)	Epoch	Age (Note: Dates are slightly uncertain with differences of a few percent between various sources being common. This is largely due to uncertainties in radiometric dating and the problem that deposits suitable for radiometric dating seldom occur exactly at the places in the geologic column where they would be most useful. The dates and errors quoted above are according to the International Commission on Stratigraphy 2012 time scale. Where errors are not quoted, errors are less than the precision of the age given. Dates labeled with a * indicate boundaries where a Global Boundary Stratotype Section and Point has been internationally agreed upon: see List of Global Boundary Stratotype Sections and Points for a complete list.)	Start, mya	Event	Notes
Cenozoic (Note: Historically, the Cenozoic has been divided up into the Quaternary and Tertiary sub-eras, as well as the Neogene and Paleogene periods. The 2009 version of the ICS time chart recognizes a slightly extended Quaternary as well as the Paleogene and a truncated Neogene, the Tertiary having been demoted to informal status.)	Quaternary	Holocene		0.0117 (Note: The start time for the Holocene epoch is here given as 11,700 years ago. For further discussion of the dating of this epoch, see Holocene.)		
Cenozoic	Quaternary	Pleistocene	Upper	0.126		
Cenozoic	Quaternary	Pleistocene	Middle	0.781	Australasian strewnfield Lake Bosumtwi	Brunhes–Matuyama reversal (778.7 ± 1.9); Jaramillo reversal (1.07)
Cenozoic	Quaternary	Pleistocene	Calabrian	1.806^{*}		Olduvai reversal
Cenozoic	Quaternary	Pleistocene	Gelasian	2.588^{*}	Chilcotin Plateau Basalts (Note: Eruptions were most vigorous 6 to 10 million years ago and 2 to 3 million years ago, when most of the basalt was released. Less extensive eruptions continued 0.01 to 1.6 million years ago. The Chilcotin Group were thought to potentially be linked to the Columbia River Basalt Group in the United States, which are coeval and lie across parts of the states of Washington, Oregon, and Idaho to the south.^{[3]} However, its morphology and geochemistry have been proven much similar to other volcanic plateaus such as the Snake River Plain in Idaho and parts of Iceland. K–Ar whole-rock dates demonstrate that several ages of basalt are represented, from Early Miocene (or even Late Oligocene?) to Early Pleistocene, with particularly abundant eruptions about 14 to 16, 9 to 6, and 1 to 3 Ma ago.)	Ice age Gauss-Matuyama reversal (2.588)
Cenozoic	Neogene	Pliocene	Piacenzian/Blancan	3.600^{*}		Gilbert-Gauss geomagnetic reversal (3.32)
Cenozoic	Neogene	Pliocene	Zanclean	5.333^{*}		Zanclean flood (5.333)
Cenozoic	Neogene	Miocene	Messinian	7.246^{*}	Chilcotin Plateau Basalts	
Cenozoic	Neogene	Miocene	Tortonian	11.62^{*}		
Cenozoic	Neogene	Miocene	Serravallian	13.82^{*}		
Cenozoic	Neogene	Miocene	Langhian	15.97	M. Miocene disruption (14.8–14.5) (Note: 14.8 to 14.5 million years ago, during the Langhian. A major and permanent cooling step occurred between 14.8 and 14.1 Ma, associated with increased production of cold Antarctic deep waters and a major growth of the East Antarctic ice sheet.); Columbia River Basalt Group (Note: The Columbia River Basalt Group is thought to be a potential link to the Chilcotin Group. The flows can be divided into four major categories: The Steens Basalt, Grande Ronde Basalt, the Wanapum Basalt, and the Saddle Mountains Basalt. The Columbia River flood basalt province comprises more than 300 individual basalt lava flows that have an average volume of 500 to 600 cubic kilometres. The Steens Basalt captured a highly detailed record of the Earth’s magnetic reversal that occurred roughly 15 million years ago. Over a 10,000 year period, more than 130 flows solidified – roughly one flow every 75 years. Most of the flows froze with a single magnetic orientation. However, several of the flows captured substantial variations in magnetic field direction as they froze. One geomagnetic field reversal occurred during the Steens Basalt eruptions at approximately 16.7 Ma, as dated using ^{40}Ar/^{39}Ar ages and the geomagnetic polarity timescale. The Imnaha lavas have been dated using the K–Ar technique, and show a broad range of dates. The oldest is 17.67±0.32 Ma with younger lava flows ranging to 15.50±0.40 Ma. The next oldest of the flows, from 17 million to 15.6 million years ago, make up the Grande Ronde Basalt. The Wanapum Basalt is made up of the Eckler Mountain Member (15.6 million years ago), the Frenchman Springs Member (15.5 million years ago), the Roza Member (14.9 million years ago) and the Priest Rapids Member (14.5 million years ago). The Saddle Mountains Basalt, seen prominently at the Saddle Mountains, is made up of the Umatilla Member flows, the Wilbur Creek Member flows, the Asotin Member flows (13 million years ago), the Weissenfels Ridge Member flows, the Esquatzel Member flows, the Elephant Mountain Member flows (10.5 million years ago), the Bujford Member flows, the Ice Harbor Member flows (8.5 million years ago) and the Lower Monumental Member flows (6 million years ago). Eruptions were most vigorous from 17 to 14 million years ago, when over 99% of the basalt was released. Less extensive eruptions continued from 14 to 6 million years ago.); Chilcotin Plateau Basalts	Increased Antarctic deep waters Yellowstone hotspot Nördlinger Ries (14.5-14.3)
Cenozoic	Neogene	Miocene	Burdigalian	20.44		
Cenozoic	Neogene	Miocene	Aquitanian	23.03^{*}	Shield volcanoes of Ethiopia (Note: erupted approximately 31 to 30 Mya, over a period of 1 Myr or less. This was about the time of a change to a colder and drier global climate, a major continental ice-sheet advance in Antarctica, the largest Tertiary sea-level drop and significant extinctions. According to Hofmann et al. (1997), most of the Ethiopian flood basalts erupted 30 Myr ago, during a short 1 Myr period, to form a vast volcanic plateau. Immediately after this peak of activity, a number of large shield volcanoes developed on the surface of the volcanic plateau, after which subsequent volcanism was largely confined to regions of rifting (Mohr, 1983a; Mohr & Zanettin, 1988). The rift that opened along the Red Sea and Gulf of Aden separated the Arabian and African continents, and isolated a small portion of the volcanic plateau in Yemen and Saudi Arabia. Volcanic activity continues to the present day along the Ethiopian and Afar rifts.)	Antarctic ice sheet completed
Cenozoic	Paleogene	Oligocene	Chattian	28.1	Ethiopian and Yemen traps (31–30)	Fish Canyon Tuff (27.51) (Note: largest known single-event volcanic eruption with a magnitude of 9.2 . It has been dated to 27.51 Ma ago. This tuff and eruption is part of the larger San Juan volcanic field and Mid-Tertiary ignimbrite flare-up.)
Cenozoic	Paleogene	Oligocene	Rupelian	33.9^{*}	Chesapeake Bay impact crater (35.5) (Note: dated at 35.5 million years)	Antarctic ice sheet expands Eocene–Oligocene extinction event
Cenozoic	Paleogene	Eocene	Priabonian	38.0		
Cenozoic	Paleogene	Eocene	Bartonian	41.3		
Cenozoic	Paleogene	Eocene	Lutetian	47.8^{*}		Antarctic ice sheet begins formation
Cenozoic	Paleogene	Eocene	Ypresian	56.0^{*}	N. Atlantic IP Phase II (56–54) (Note: Isotopic dating indicates the most active magmatic phase of the NAIP to be ca. 60.5–54.5 Ma (million years ago)^{[4]} (mid-Paleocene to early Eocene) - further divided into Phase 1 (pre-break-up phase) dated to ca. 62–58 Ma and Phase 2 (syn-break-up phase) dated to ca. 56–54 Ma) (Brito-Arctic province) (~56) (Note: Basaltic volcanism flowed in two main pulses. The first which occurred ~61 million years ago was of 2 to 106 km^{3} in total volume, into the current western and southeastern Greenland and northwestern Britain. The second and larger flood basalt flow occurred ~56 to 54 Ma years ago in both eastern Greenland and the Faroe Islands.)	
Cenozoic	Paleogene	Paleocene	Thanetian	59.2^{*}		
Cenozoic	Paleogene	Paleocene	Selandian	61.6^{*}	N. Atlantic IP (62–58) (Brito-Arctic province) (~61) (Thulean Plateau)	Iceland hotspot (Note: it is speculated that the present day Iceland hotspot originated as a mantle plume on the Alpha Ridge (Arctic Ocean) ca. 130–120 Ma, migrated down Ellesmere Island, through Baffin Island, onto the west coast of Greenland, and finally arrived on the east coast of Greenland by ca. 60 Ma)
Cenozoic	Paleogene	Paleocene	Danian	65.5 ± 0.3^{*}	Chicxulub Crater (65.5 ± 0.3) (Note: The age of Chicxulub asteroid impact and the Cretaceous–Paleogene boundary (65.5 ± 0.3) coincide precisely. Even the most energetic known volcanic eruption, which released approximately 240 gigatons of TNT (1.0×1021 J) and created the La Garita Caldera, was substantially less powerful than the Chicxulub impact. Gerta Keller of Princeton University argues that recent core samples from Chicxulub prove the impact occurred about 300,000 years before the mass extinction.); Deccan Traps (65.5 ± 0.3) (Note: The Deccan Traps formed between 60 and 68 million years ago, at the end of the Cretaceous period. The bulk of the volcanic eruption occurred at the Western Ghats (near Mumbai) some 65 million years ago. This series of eruptions may have lasted less than 30,000 years in total. The motion of the Indian tectonic plate and the eruptive history of the Deccan traps show strong correlations. Based on data from marine magnetic profiles, a pulse of unusually rapid plate motion begins at the same time as the first pulse of Deccan flood basalts, which is dated at 67 Myr ago. The spreading rate rapidly increased and reached a maximum at the same time as the peak basaltic eruptions. The spreading rate then dropped off, with the decrease occurring around 63 Myr ago, by which time the main phase of Deccan volcanism ended.)	Cretaceous–Paleogene extinction event Shiva crater
Mesozoic	Cretaceous	Upper	Maastrichtian	72.1 ± 0.2^{*}		
Mesozoic	Cretaceous	Upper	Campanian	83.6 ± 0.2	Caribbean LIP (76-74) (Note: The volcanism took place between 139 and 69 million years ago, with the majority of act1ivity appearing to lie between 95 and 88 Ma with peaks at 74-76, 80-82, and 88-90 Ma in decreasing order of importance.); Caribbean LIP (82-80)	
Mesozoic	Cretaceous	Upper	Santonian	86.3 ± 0.5		
Mesozoic	Cretaceous	Upper	Coniacian	89.8 ± 0.3	High Arctic LIP (~90-80) (Note: The HALIP is defined as a long lasting (ca. 50 Ma) diffuse volcanic period punctuated by two distinct volcanic events: the ~120-130 Ma Barremian and the ~80-90 Ma Turonian events. In this contribution, we sub-divided the HALIP into two separate LIPs: (1) the ~120-130 Ma Early Cretaceous BLIP which was related to the opening of the Canada Basin, and (2) the ~80-90 Ma Late Cretaceous SLIP which was related to the formation of the Alpha Ridge.); Caribbean LIP (90-88); Ontong Java Plateau (Note: Although they are now separated by thousands of kilometres, Manihiki Plateau and Hikurangi Plateau were then part of the same large igneous province, forming the world's largest oceanic plateau. The Ontong Java Plateau was formed 125–120 million years ago with some secondary volcanism occurring 20–40 million years later.)	Galápagos hotspot
Mesozoic	Cretaceous	Upper	Turonian	93.5 ± 0.8^{*}	Cenomanian-Turonian boundary event (91.5 ± 8.6) (Note: Detailed stratigraphic studies of Cretaceous black shales from many parts of the world have indicated that two oceanic anoxic events were particularly significant in terms of their impact on the chemistry of the oceans, one in the early Aptian (~120 Ma), sometimes called the Selli Event (or OAE 1a) after the Italian geologist, Raimondo Selli (1916–1983), and another at the Cenomanian–Turonian boundary (~93 Ma), sometimes called the Bonarelli Event which occurred approximately 91.5 ± 8.6 million years ago. One possible cause was sub-oceanic volcanism occurring approximately 500,000 years earlier.); Madagascar flood basalt (94.5±1.2)	
Mesozoic	Cretaceous	Upper	Cenomanian	100.5^{*}		
Mesozoic	Cretaceous	Lower	Albian	c. 113.0	Kerguelen Plateau (110) (Note: The plateau was produced by the Kerguelen hotspot, starting with or following the breakup of Gondwana about 130 million years ago. The Kerguelen Plateau was formed starting 110 million years ago from a series of large volcanic eruptions.); Rajmahal Traps (118) (Note: This volcanic rocks are formed from the eruption of Kerguelen hot spot in the early Cretaceous age. The similarity between the geochemical data of Rajmahal volcanis and lavas of the Kerguelen plateau confirms this. The lava pile of ~230 m thickness in the Rajmahal Hills, Jharkhand, and alkalic basalts in the Bengal Basin were emplaced at ~118 Ma.)	Kerguelen hotspot
Mesozoic	Cretaceous	Lower	Aptian	c. 125.0	Selli Event (~120); Ontong Java Plateau (125–120)	Louisville hotspot
Mesozoic	Cretaceous	Lower	Barremian	c. 129.4	High Arctic LIP (130-120)	
Mesozoic	Cretaceous	Lower	Hauterivian	c. 132.9	Abor volcanics (135)	Kerguelen hotspot
Mesozoic	Cretaceous	Lower	Valanginian	c. 139.8	Paraná and Etendeka traps (138-128) (Note: The original basalt flows occurred 128 to 138 million years ago. The basalt samples at Paraná and Etendeka have an age of about 132 Ma.)	Tristan hotspot
Mesozoic	Cretaceous	Lower	Berriasian	c. 145.0		Glaciations; End-Jurassic extinction
Mesozoic	Jurassic	Upper	Tithonian	152.1 ± 0.9		
Mesozoic	Jurassic	Upper	Kimmeridgian	157.3 ± 1.0		
Mesozoic	Jurassic	Upper	Oxfordian	163.5 ± 1.0		
Mesozoic	Jurassic	Middle	Callovian	166.1 ± 1.2		
Mesozoic	Jurassic	Middle	Bathonian	168.3 ± 1.3^{*}		
Mesozoic	Jurassic	Middle	Bajocian	170.3 ± 1.4^{*}		
Mesozoic	Jurassic	Middle	Aalenian	174.1 ± 1.0^{*}		
Mesozoic	Jurassic	Lower	Toarcian	182.7 ± 0.7	early Toarcian anoxic event Karoo-Ferrar (~183) (Note: It formed just prior to the breakup of Gondwana in the Lower Jurassic epoch, about 183 million years ago; this timing corresponds to the early Toarcian anoxic event and the Pliensbachian-Toarcian extinction.)	Pliensbachian-Toarcian extinction Formed as Gondwana broke up
Mesozoic	Jurassic	Lower	Pliensbachian	190.8 ± 1.0^{*}		
Mesozoic	Jurassic	Lower	Sinemurian	199.3 ± 0.3^{*}	C. Atlantic magmatic province (Recurrent)(197±1) (Note: Ages were determined by 40Ar/39Ar analysis on plagioclase (Knight et al. 2004), (Verati et al. 2007), (Marzoli et al. 2004). These data show indistinguishable ages (199.5±0.5 Ma) from Lower to Upper lava flows, from central to northern Morocco. Therefore the CAMP is an intense and short magmatic event. Basalts of the Recurrent unit are slightly younger (mean age: 197±1 Ma) and represent a late event. According to magnetostratigraphic data, the Moroccan CAMP were divided into five groups, differing in paleomagnetic orientations(declination and inclination) (Knight et al. 2004). Each group is composed by a smaller number of lava flows (i.e., a lower volume) than the preceding one. These data suggest that the CAMP were created by five short magma pulses and eruption events, each one possibly < 400 years (?) long. All lava flow sequences are characterized by normal polarity, except for a brief paleomagnetic reversal yielded by one lava flow and by a localized interlayered limestone in two distinct section of the High Atlas CAMP.)	
Mesozoic	Jurassic	Lower	Hettangian	201.3 ± 0.2^{*}	Central Atlantic magmatic province (199.5±0.5)	Formed as Pangea broke up Triassic–Jurassic extinction event
Mesozoic	Triassic	Upper	Rhaetian	c. 208.5		
Mesozoic	Triassic	Upper	Norian	c. 228	Wrangellia flood basalts (231–225) (Note: Although composed of many different rocks types, of various composition, age, and tectonic affinity, it is the late Triassic flood basalts that are the defining unit of Wrangellia. These basalts, extruded onto land over 5 million years about ~231–225 Ma.)	Carnian pluvial episode
Mesozoic	Triassic	Upper	Carnian	c. 235^{*}		
Mesozoic	Triassic	Middle	Ladinian	c. 242^{*}		
Mesozoic	Triassic	Middle	Anisian	247.2		
Mesozoic	Triassic	Lower	Olenekian	251.2		
Mesozoic	Triassic	Lower	Induan	252.2 ± 0.5^{*}	Siberian Traps (252.6) (Note: This massive eruptive event spanned the Permian-Triassic boundary, about 250 million years ago, and is cited as a possible cause of the Permian-Triassic extinction event. The Siberian Traps are considered to have erupted via numerous vents over a period of roughly a million years or more. The source of the Siberian Traps basalt has variously been attributed to a mantle plume which impacted the base of the earth's crust and erupted through the Siberian Craton, or to processes related to plate tectonics. Another possible cause may be the impact that formed the Wilkes Land crater, which may have been contemporaneous and would have been antipodal to the Traps. However, there are already other suggested candidates for giant impacts at the Permian–Triassic boundary, for example Bedout off the northern coast of Western Australia, although all are equally contentious.)	Permian–Triassic extinction event
Paleozoic	Permian	Lopingian	Changhsingian	254.2 ± 0.1^{*}		
Paleozoic	Permian	Lopingian	Wuchiapingian	259.9 ± 0.4^{*}	Emeishan Traps (258) (Note: The eruptions that produced the Emeishan Traps began c. 260 million years ago (Ma). In volume, the Emeishan Traps are dwarfed by the massive Siberian Traps, which occurred, in terms of the geological time scale, not long after, at c. 251 Ma. Nonetheless, the Emeishan Traps eruptions were serious enough to have global ecological and paleontological impact. The Emeishan Traps are associated with the so-called end-Guadalupian Extinction or end-Capitanian mass extinction. Emeishan volcanism was active at 258–246 Ma)	End-Capitanian/Guadalupian Extinction
Paleozoic	Permian	Guadalupian	Capitanian	265.1 ± 0.4^{*}		
Paleozoic	Permian	Guadalupian	Wordian/Kazanian	268.8 ± 0.5^{*}		
Paleozoic	Permian	Guadalupian	Roadian/Ufimian	272.3 ± 0.5^{*}		Olson's Extinction
Paleozoic	Permian	Cisuralian	Kungurian	279.3 ± 0.6		
Paleozoic	Permian	Cisuralian	Artinskian	290.1 ± 0.1		
Paleozoic	Permian	Cisuralian	Sakmarian	295.5 ± 0.4		
Paleozoic	Permian	Cisuralian	Asselian	298.9 ± 0.2^{*}	Skagerrak-Centered LIP (297±4 Ma) (Note: After restoring the center of the Skagerrak-Centered Large Igneous Province (SCLIP)using a new reference frame, it has been shown that the Skagerrak plume rose from the core–mantle boundary (CMB) to its ~300 Ma position.^{[18]} The major eruption interval took place in very narrow time interval, of 297±4 Ma. This rift formation coincides with the Moskovian/Kasimovian boundary and the Carboniferous Rainforest Collapse.)	Pangaea
Paleozoic	Carbon- iferous (Note: In North America, the Carboniferous is subdivided into Mississippian and Pennsylvanian (geology) Periods.)/ Pennsyl- vanian	Upper	Gzhelian	303.7 ± 0.1		
Paleozoic	Carbon- iferous/ Pennsyl- vanian	Upper	Kasimovian	307.0 ± 0.1		Carboniferous Rainforest Collapse (~305) (Note: occurred around 305 million years ago in the Carboniferous period.)
Paleozoic	Carbon- iferous/ Pennsyl- vanian	Middle	Moscovian	315.2 ± 0.2		
Paleozoic	Carbon- iferous/ Pennsyl- vanian	Lower	Bashkirian	323.2 ± 0.4^{*}		
Paleozoic	Carbon- iferous/ Missis- sippian	Upper	Serpukhovian	330.9 ± 0.2		
Paleozoic	Carbon- iferous/ Missis- sippian	Middle	Viséan	346.7 ± 0.4^{*}		
Paleozoic	Carbon- iferous/ Missis- sippian	Lower	Tournaisian	358.9 ± 0.4^{*}	Hangenberg event (358.9 ± 0.4) (Note: The Hangenberg event sits on or just below the Devonian/Carboniferous boundary and marks the last spike in the period of extinction. It is marked by an anoxic black shale layer and an overlying sandstone deposit.^{[18]} Unlike the Kellwasser event, the Hangenberg event affected marine and terrestrial habitats.)	Late Devonian extinction
Paleozoic	Devonian	Upper	Famennian	372.2 ± 1.6^{*}	Kellwasser_event (372.2 ± 1.6) (Note: the extinction pulse that occurs near the Frasnian/Famennian boundary.); Viluy traps (373.4 ± 0.7) (Note: With the K-Ar technique, ages ranging from 338 to 367 Ma with uncertainties on the order of 5 Ma were obtained. With the ^{40}Ar/^{39}Ar technique, integrated ages range from 344 to 367 Ma, with uncertainties on the order of 1 Ma, and two samples yielded plateaus, i.e. the best determined ages, at 360.3 ± 0.9 and 370.0 ± 0.7 Ma. Three out of four ages yielded by the two separate methods are in agreement within uncertainties. One sample yields incompatible ages and could be from a later, altered dyke event. The ^{40}Ar/^{39}Ar plateau age of 370.0 ± 0.7 Ma (conventional calibration) or 373.4 ± 0.7 Ma (recalculated per Renne et al., 2010), the most reliable age obtained in this study, is compatible with recent determinations of the Late Devonian extinction events at the end-Frasnian (~ 376 ± 3 Ma). These results underscore a need for further work, in progress.)	Late Devonian extinction (Note: Impact craters, such as the Kellwasser-aged Alamo and the Hangenberg-aged Woodleigh, cannot generally be dated with sufficient precision to link them to the event.)
Paleozoic	Devonian	Upper	Frasnian	382.7 ± 1.6^{*}		
Paleozoic	Devonian	Middle	Givetian	387.7 ± 0.8^{*}		
Paleozoic	Devonian	Middle	Eifelian	393.3 ± 1.2^{*}		
Paleozoic	Devonian	Lower	Emsian	407.6 ± 2.6^{*}		
Paleozoic	Devonian	Lower	Pragian	410.8 ± 2.8^{*}		
Paleozoic	Devonian	Lower	Lochkovian	419.2 ± 3.2^{*}		
Paleozoic	Silurian	Pridoli	(Stage 8)	423.0 ± 2.3^{*}	Lau event (423.0 ± 2.3) (Note: The Lau event started at the beginning of the late Ludfordian, a subdivision of the Ludlow stage, about 420 million years ago. It coincided with a global low point in sea level, is closely followed by an excursion in geochemical isotopes in the ensuing late Ludfordian faunal stage and a change in depositional regime. Profound sedimentary changes occurred at the beginning of the Lau event; these are probably associated with the onset of sea level rise, which continued through the event, reaching a high point at the time of deposition of the Burgsvik beds, after the event.)	
Paleozoic	Silurian	Ludlow/Cayugan	Ludfordian	425.6 ± 0.9^{*}		
Paleozoic	Silurian	Ludlow/Cayugan	Gorstian	427.4 ± 0.5^{*}	Mulde event (427.4 ± 0.5) (Note: The Mulde event was a secundo-secundo event,^{[3]} and marked the second of three1 relatively minor mass extinctions during the Silurian period. It coincided with a global drop in sea level, and is closely followed by an excursion in geochemical isotopes. Its onset is synchronous with the deposition of the Fröel formation in Gotland.)	
Paleozoic	Silurian	Wenlock	Homerian/Lockportian	430.5 ± 0.7^{*}		
Paleozoic	Silurian	Wenlock	Sheinwoodian/Tonawandan	433.4 ± 0.8^{*}	Ireviken event (433.4 ± 2.3) (Note: The Ireviken event was a minor extinction event at the Llandovery/Wenlock boundary (mid Silurian, 433.4 ± 2.3 million years ago). The event lasted around 200,000 years, spanning the base of the Wenlock epoch. It comprises eight extinction "datum points"—the first four being regularly spaced, every 30,797 years, and linked to the Milankovic obliquity cycle. The fifth and sixth probably reflect maxima in the precessional cycles, with periods of around 16.5 and 19 ka. Subsequent to the first extinctions, excursions in the δ13C and δ18O records are observed; δ13C rises from +1.4‰ to +4.5‰, while δ18O increases from −5.6‰ to −5.0‰ .)	
Paleozoic	Silurian	Llandovery/ Alexandrian	Telychian/Ontarian	438.5 ± 1.1^{*}		
Paleozoic	Silurian	Llandovery/ Alexandrian	Aeronian	440.8 ± 1.2^{*}		
Paleozoic	Silurian	Llandovery/ Alexandrian	Rhuddanian	443.4 ± 1.5^{*}		Ordovician–Silurian extinction event
Paleozoic	Ordovician	Upper	Hirnantian	445.2 ± 1.4^{*}	Pre-Devonian Traps (~445)	
Paleozoic	Ordovician	Upper	Katian	453.0 ± 0.7^{*}		
Paleozoic	Ordovician	Upper	Sandbian	458.4 ± 0.9^{*}		
Paleozoic	Ordovician	Middle	Darriwilian	467.3 ± 1.1^{*}		
Paleozoic	Ordovician	Middle	Dapingian	470.0 ± 1.4^{*}		
Paleozoic	Ordovician	Lower	Floian (formerly Arenig)	477.7 ± 1.4^{*}		
Paleozoic	Ordovician	Lower	Tremadocian	485.4 ± 1.9^{*}		
Paleozoic	Cambrian	Furongian	Stage 10	c. 489.5		Cambrian–Ordovician extinction event
Paleozoic	Cambrian	Furongian	Jiangshanian	c. 494^{*}		
Paleozoic	Cambrian	Furongian	Paibian	c. 497^{*}		
Paleozoic	Cambrian	Series 3	Guzhangian	c. 500.5^{*}		
Paleozoic	Cambrian	Series 3	Drumian	c. 504.5^{*}		
Paleozoic	Cambrian	Series 3	Stage 5	c. 509		
Paleozoic	Cambrian	Series 2	Stage 4	c. 514		
Paleozoic	Cambrian	Series 2	Stage 3	c. 521		
Paleozoic	Cambrian	Terreneuvian	Stage 2	c. 529		Cambrian explosion
Paleozoic	Cambrian	Terreneuvian	Fortunian	541.0 ± 1.0^{*}		End-Ediacaran extinction
Neo- proterozoic (Note: The Proterozoic, Archean and Hadean are often collectively referred to as the Precambrian Time or sometimes, also the Cryptozoic.)	Ediacaran			c. 635^{*}	Long Range dikes (620)	Formed during the creation of the Iapetus Ocean
Neo- proterozoic	Cryogenian			850 (Note: Defined by absolute age (Global Standard Stratigraphic Age).)	Franklin LIP (716.5)	Snowball Earth
Neo- proterozoic	Tonian			1000	Warakurna LIP (~1075)	
Meso- proterozoic	Stenian			1200	Midcontinent Rift System (~1100) (Note: about 1.1 billion years ago.); Mackenzie LIP (~1270)	Rodinia
Meso- proterozoic	Ectasian			1400		
Meso- proterozoic	Calymmian			1600		
Paleo- proterozoic	Statherian			1800	Circum-Superior Belt (1884-1864) (Note: 1,884 to 1,864 million years ago.); Winagami sill complex (1890-1760)	
Paleo- proterozoic	Orosirian			2050	Kapuskasing and Marathon dike swarm (2126-2101); Fort Frances dike swarm (2076-2067); Vredefort impact structure (2023±4) (Note: estimated to be 2.023 billion years (±4 million years).)	
Paleo- proterozoic	Rhyacian			2300	Ungava magmatic event	Huronian glaciation (2220)
Paleo- proterozoic	Siderian			2500	Matachewan dike swarm (2500-2450); Mistassini dike swarm (2500)	Great Oxygenation Event
Neoarchean				2800		
Mesoarchean				3200		
Paleoarchean				3600	Kaapvaal craton (3600-3700)	Vaalbara
Eoarchean				4000		
Early Imbrian (Note: These unit names were taken from the Lunar geologic timescale and refer to geologic events that did not occur on Earth. Their use for Earth geology is unofficial. Note that their start times do not dovetail perfectly with the later, terrestrially defined boundaries.)				c. 3850		
Nectarian				c. 3920		Lunar basins form
Basin Groups				c. 4150	Acasta Gneiss	Late Heavy Bombardment
Cryptic (Note: The “Cryptic era” is an informal geologic term, like the “Precambrian”. It has no official definition.)				c. 4600		Oldest minerals. Earth's surface solidifies.

== See also ==
- List of Oceanic Landforms
- World's largest eruptions
