= Sverdrup Basin Magmatic Province =

Large igneous province in the Arctic

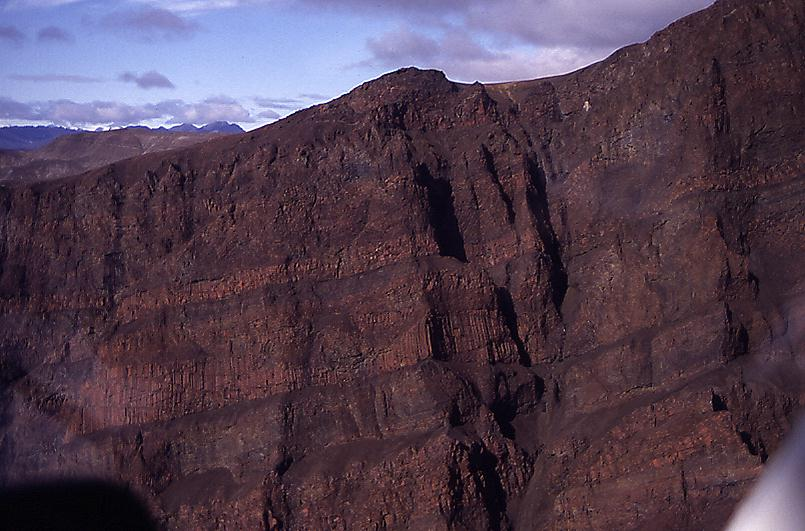
Dragon Cliff of the Strand Fiord Formation

The Sverdrup Basin Magmatic Province is a large igneous province located on Axel Heiberg Island and Ellesmere Island, Nunavut, Canada near the rifted margin of the Arctic Ocean at the end of Alpha Ridge.

With an area of 550,110 km^{2}, the Sverdrup Basin Magmatic Province forms part of the larger High Arctic Large Igneous Province and consists of flood basalts, dikes and sills which form two volcanic formations called the Ellesmere Island Volcanics and Strand Fiord Formation.

The flood basalt lava flows are similar to those of the Columbia River Basalt Group in the U.S. states of Washington, Oregon and Idaho.

== See also ==
- Ashton F. Embry
- Volcanism of Canada
- Volcanism of Northern Canada
- List of volcanoes in Canada
