= Large igneous province =

Huge regional accumulation of igneous rocks

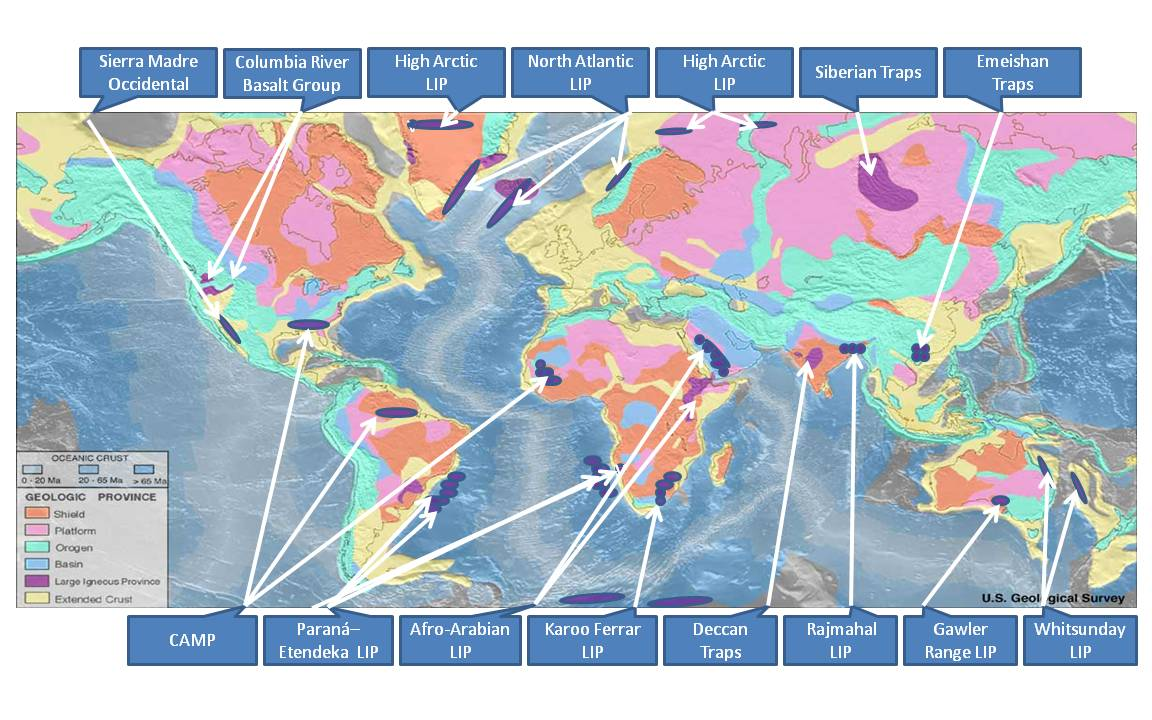
Only a few of the largest large igneous provinces appear (coloured dark purple) on this geological map, which depicts crustal geologic provinces as seen in seismic refraction data.

A large igneous province (LIP) is an extremely large accumulation of igneous rocks, including intrusive (sills, dikes) and extrusive (lava flows, tephra deposits), arising when magma travels through the crust towards the surface. The formation of LIPs is variously attributed to mantle plumes or to processes associated with divergent plate tectonics. The formation of some of the LIPs in the past 500 million years coincide in time with mass extinctions and rapid climatic changes, which has led to numerous hypotheses about causal relationships. LIPs are fundamentally different from any other currently active volcanoes or volcanic systems.

== Overview ==
=== Definition ===
In 1992, Coffin and Eldholm initially defined the term "large igneous province" as representing a variety of mafic igneous provinces with areal extent greater than 100,000 km^{2} that represented "massive crustal emplacements of predominantly mafic (magnesium- and iron-rich) extrusive and intrusive rock, and originated via processes other than 'normal' seafloor spreading." That original definition included continental flood basalts, oceanic plateaus, large dike swarms (the eroded roots of a volcanic province), and volcanic rifted margins. Mafic basalt sea floors and other geological products of 'normal' plate tectonics were not included in the definition. Most of these LIPs consist of basalt, but some contain large volumes of associated rhyolite (e.g. the Columbia River Basalt Group in the western United States); the rhyolite is typically very dry compared to island arc rhyolites, with much higher eruption temperatures (850 °C to 1000 °C) than normal rhyolites. Some LIPs are geographically intact, such as the basaltic Deccan Traps in India, while others have been fragmented and separated by plate movements, like the Central Atlantic magmatic province—parts of which are found in Brazil, eastern North America, and northwestern Africa.

In 2008, Bryan and Ernst refined the definition to narrow it somewhat: "Large Igneous Provinces are magmatic provinces with areal extents >1×10^{5} km^{2}, igneous volumes >1×10^{5} km^{3} and maximum lifespans of ~50 Myr that have intraplate tectonic settings or geochemical affinities, and are characterised by igneous pulse(s) of short duration (~1–5 Myr), during which a large proportion (>75%) of the total igneous volume has been emplaced. They are dominantly mafic, but also can have significant ultramafic and silicic components, and some are dominated by silicic magmatism." This definition places emphasis on the high magma emplacement rate characteristics of the LIP event and excludes seamounts, seamount groups, submarine ridges and anomalous seafloor crust.

The definition has since been expanded and refined, and remains a work in progress. Some new definitions of LIP include large granitic provinces such as those found in the Andes Mountains of South America and in western North America. Comprehensive taxonomies have been developed to focus technical discussions. Sub-categorization of LIPs into large volcanic provinces (LVP) and large plutonic provinces (LPP), and including rocks produced by normal plate tectonic processes, have been proposed, but these modifications are not generally accepted. LIP is now frequently used to also describe voluminous areas of, not just mafic, but all types of igneous rocks. Further, the minimum threshold to be included as a LIP has been lowered to 50,000 km^{2}. The working taxonomy, focused heavily on geochemistry, is:

- Large volcanic province (LVP)
  - Large rhyolitic province (LRP)
  - Large andesitic province (LAP)
  - Large basaltic province (LBP): oceanic, or continental flood basalts
  - Large basaltic–rhyolitic province (LBRP)
- Large plutonic province (LPP)
  - Large granitic province (LGP)
  - Large mafic plutonic province

=== Study ===
Because large igneous provinces are created during short-lived igneous events resulting in relatively rapid and high-volume accumulations of volcanic and intrusive igneous rock, they warrant study. LIPs present confirmed and or possible links to mass extinctions and global environmental and climatic changes. Michael Rampino and Richard Stothers cite 11 distinct flood basalt episodes—occurring in the past 250 million years—which created volcanic provinces and oceanic plateaus and coincided with mass extinctions. This theme has developed into a broad field of research, bridging geoscience disciplines such as biostratigraphy, volcanology, metamorphic petrology, and Earth System Modelling.

The study of LIPs has economic implications. Some workers associate them with trapped hydrocarbons. They are associated with economic concentrations of copper–nickel and iron. They are also associated with formation of major mineral provinces including platinum group element deposits and, in the silicic LIPs, silver and gold deposits. Titanium and vanadium deposits are also found in association with LIPs.

LIPs in the geological record have marked major changes in the hydrosphere and atmosphere, leading to major climate shifts and maybe mass extinctions of species. Some of these changes were related to rapid release of greenhouse gases from the lithosphere to the atmosphere. Thus the LIP-triggered changes may be used as cases to understand current and future environmental changes.

Plate tectonic theory explains topography using interactions between the tectonic plates, as influenced by viscous stresses created by flow within the underlying mantle. Since the mantle is extremely viscous, the mantle flow rate varies in pulses which are reflected in the lithosphere by small amplitude, long wavelength undulations. Understanding how the interaction between mantle flow and lithosphere elevation influences formation of LIPs is important to gaining insights into past mantle dynamics. LIPs have played a major role in the cycles of continental breakup, continental formation, new crustal additions from the upper mantle, and supercontinent cycles.

== Formation ==
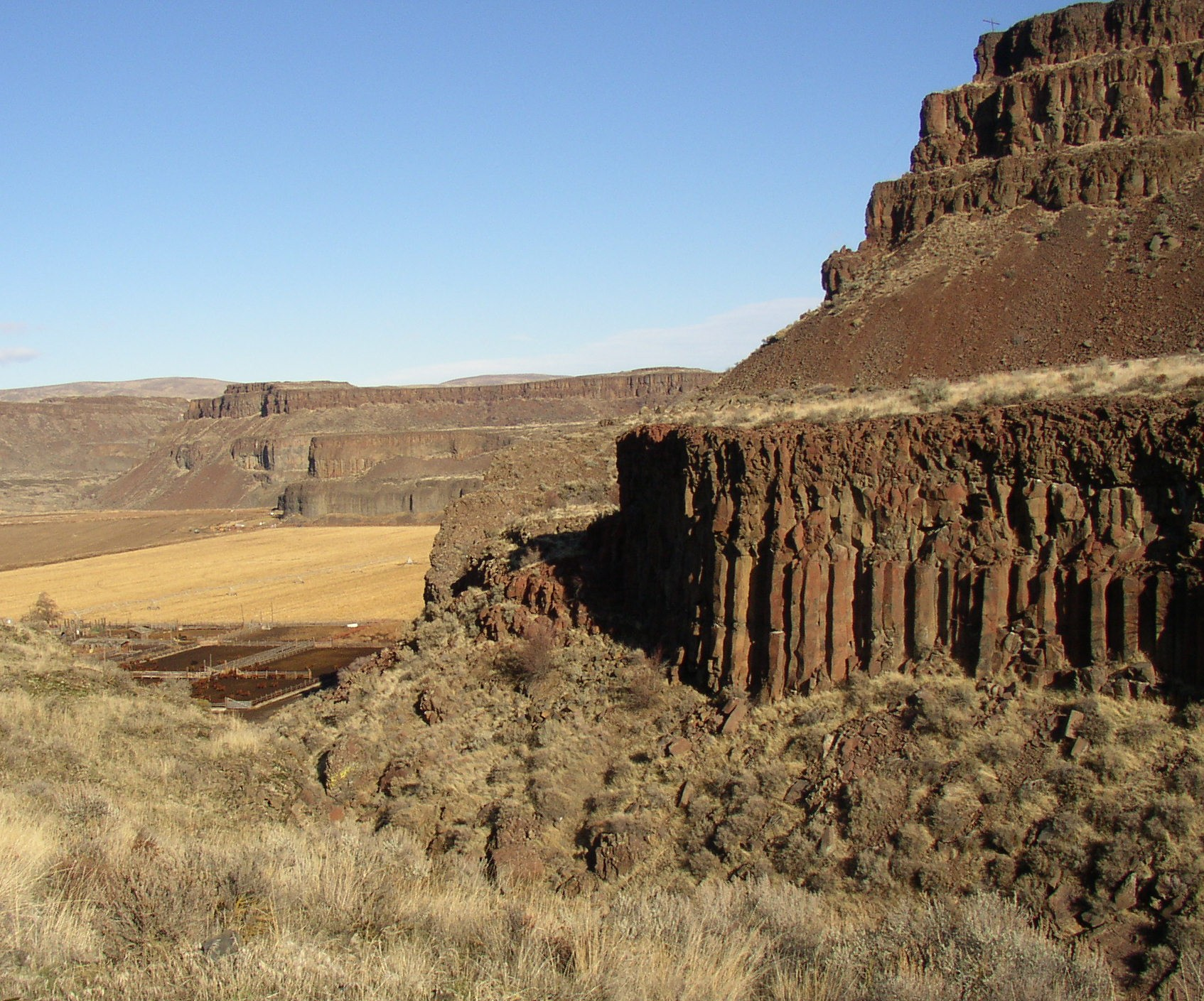
Three Devils Grade in Moses Coulee, Washington is part of the Columbia River Basalt Group LIP.

Earth has an outer shell made of discrete, moving tectonic plates floating on a solid convective mantle above a liquid core. The mantle's flow is driven by the descent of cold tectonic plates during subduction and the complementary ascent of mantle plumes of hot material from lower levels. The surface of the Earth reflects stretching, thickening and bending of the tectonic plates as they interact.

Ocean-plate creation at upwellings, spreading and subduction are well accepted fundamentals of plate tectonics, with the upwelling of hot mantle materials and the sinking of the cooler ocean plates driving the mantle convection. In this model, tectonic plates diverge at mid-ocean ridges, where hot mantle rock flows upward to fill the space. Plate-tectonic processes account for the vast majority of Earth's volcanism.

Beyond the effects of convectively driven motion, deep processes have other influences on the surface topography. The convective circulation drives up-wellings and down-wellings in Earth's mantle that are reflected in local surface levels. Hot mantle materials rising up in a plume can spread out radially beneath the tectonic plate causing regions of uplift. These ascending plumes play an important role in LIP formation.

When created, LIPs often have an areal extent of a few million square kilometers and volumes on the order of 1 million cubic kilometers. In most cases, the majority of a basaltic LIP's volume is emplaced in less than 1 million years. One of the conundrums of such LIPs' origins is to understand how enormous volumes of basaltic magma are formed and erupted over such short time scales, with effusion rates up to an order of magnitude greater than mid-ocean ridge basalts. The source of many or all LIPs are variously attributed to mantle plumes, to processes associated with plate tectonics or to meteorite impacts.

=== Hotspots ===
Although most volcanic activity on Earth is associated with subduction zones or mid-oceanic ridges, there are significant regions of long-lived, extensive volcanism, known as hotspots, which are only indirectly related to plate tectonics. The Hawaiian–Emperor seamount chain, located on the Pacific Plate, is one example, tracing millions of years of relative motion as the plate moves over the Hawaii hotspot. Numerous hotspots of varying size and age have been identified across the world. These hotspots move slowly with respect to one another but move an order of magnitude more quickly with respect to tectonic plates, providing evidence that they are not directly linked to tectonic plates.

The origin of hotspots remains controversial. Hotspots that reach the Earth's surface may have three distinct origins. The deepest probably originate from the boundary between the lower mantle and the core; roughly 15–20% have characteristics such as presence of a linear chain of sea mounts with increasing ages, LIPs at the point of origin of the track, low shear wave velocity indicating high temperatures below the current location of the track, and ratios of ^{3}He to ^{4}He which are judged consistent with a deep origin. Others such as the Pitcairn, Samoan and Tahitian hotspots appear to originate at the top of large, transient, hot lava domes (termed superswells) in the mantle. The remainder appear to originate in the upper mantle and have been suggested to result from the breakup of subducting lithosphere.

Recent imaging of the region below known hotspots (for example, Yellowstone and Hawaii) using seismic-wave tomography has produced mounting evidence that supports relatively narrow, deep-origin, convective plumes that are limited in region compared to the large-scale plate tectonic circulation in which they are imbedded. Images reveal continuous but convoluted vertical paths with varying quantities of hotter material, even at depths where crystallographic transformations are predicted to occur.

=== Plate ruptures ===
A major alternative to the plume model is a model in which ruptures are caused by plate-related stresses that fractured the lithosphere, allowing melt to reach the surface from shallow heterogeneous sources. The high volumes of molten material that form the LIPs is postulated to be caused by convection in the upper mantle, which is secondary to the convection driving tectonic plate motion.

=== Early formed reservoir outpourings ===
It has been proposed that geochemical evidence supports an early-formed reservoir that survived in the Earth's mantle for about 4.5 billion years. Molten material is postulated to have originated from this reservoir, contributing the Baffin Island flood basalt about 60 million years ago. Basalts from the Ontong Java Plateau show similar isotopic and trace element signatures proposed for the early-Earth reservoir.

=== Meteorites ===
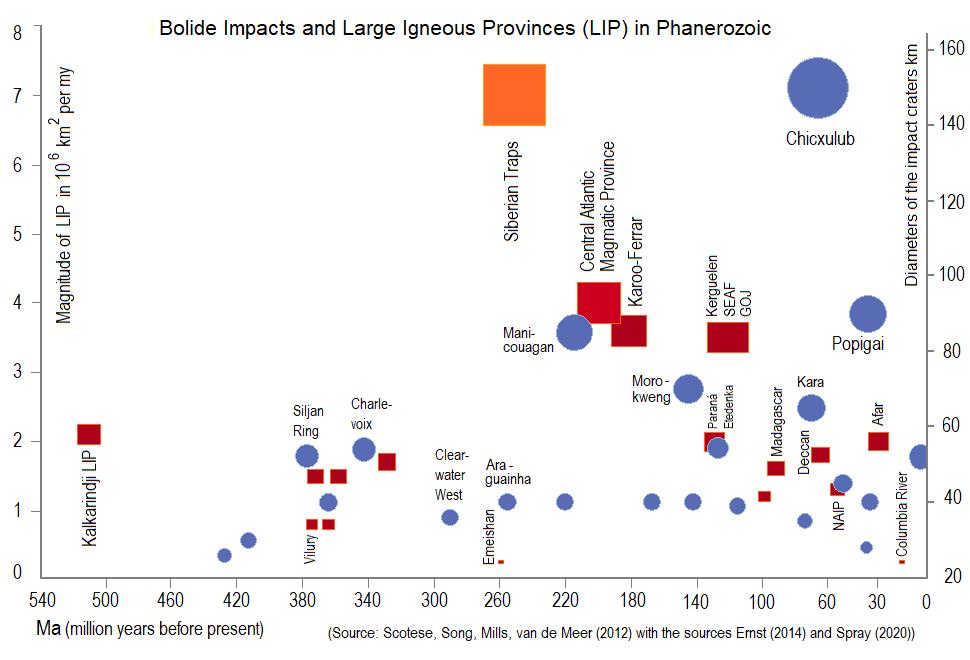

Seven pairs of hotspots and LIPs located on opposite sides of the earth have been noted; analyses indicate this coincident antipodal location is highly unlikely to be random. The hotspot pairs include a large igneous province with continental volcanism opposite an oceanic hotspot. Oceanic impacts of large meteorites are expected to have high efficiency in converting energy into seismic waves. These waves would propagate around the world and reconverge close to the antipodal position; small variations are expected as the seismic velocity varies depending upon the route characteristics along which the waves propagate. As the waves focus on the antipodal position, they put the crust at the focal point under significant stress and are proposed to rupture it, creating antipodal pairs. When the meteorite impacts a continent, the lower efficiency of kinetic energy conversion into seismic energy is not expected to create an antipodal hotspot.

A second impact-related model of hotspot and LIP formation has been suggested in which minor hotspot volcanism was generated at large-body impact sites and flood basalt volcanism was triggered antipodally by focused seismic energy. This model has been challenged because impacts are generally considered seismically too inefficient, and the Deccan Traps of India were not antipodal to (and began erupting several Myr before) the Chicxulub impact in Mexico. In addition, no clear example of impact-induced volcanism, unrelated to melt sheets, has been confirmed at any known terrestrial crater.

== Correlations with LIP formation ==
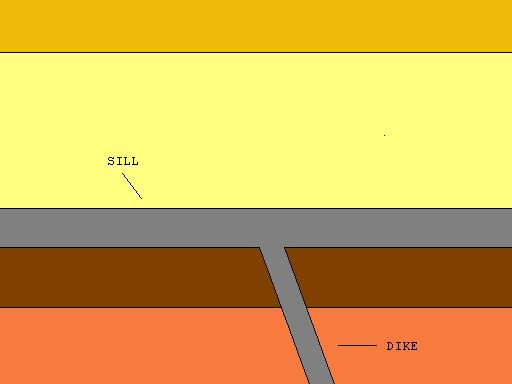
Illustration showing a vertical dike and a horizontal sill.

Aerally extensive dike swarms, sill provinces, and large layered ultramafic intrusions are indicators of LIPs, even when other evidence is not now observable. The upper basalt layers of older LIPs may have been removed by erosion or deformed by tectonic plate collisions occurring after the layer is formed. This is especially likely for earlier periods such as the Paleozoic and Proterozoic.

=== Dyke swarms ===
Giant dyke swarms having lengths over 300 km are a common record of severely eroded LIPs. Both radial and linear dyke swarm configurations exist. Radial swarms with an areal extent over 2,000 km and linear swarms extending over 1,000 km are known. The linear dyke swarms often have a high proportion of dykes relative to country rocks, particularly when the width of the linear field is less than 100 km. The dykes have a typical width of 20–100 m, although ultramafic dykes with widths greater than 1 km have been reported.

Dykes are typically sub-vertical to vertical. When upward flowing (dyke-forming) magma encounters horizontal boundaries or weaknesses, such as between layers in a sedimentary deposit, the magma can flow horizontally creating a sill. Some sill provinces have areal extents >1000 km.

=== Sills ===
A series of related sills that were formed essentially contemporaneously (within several million years) from related dikes comprise a LIP if their area is sufficiently large. Examples include:

- Winagami sill complex (northwestern Alberta, Canada)
- Bushveld Igneous Complex (South Africa)

=== Volcanic rifted margins ===
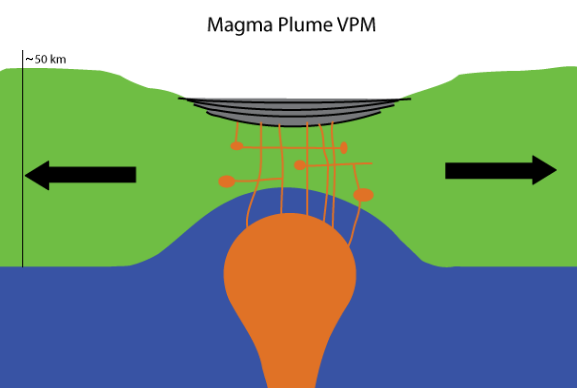
Extension thins the crust. Magma reaches the surface through radiating sills and dikes, forming basalt flows, as well as deep and shallow magma chambers below the surface. The crust gradually thins due to thermal subsidence, and originally horizontal basalt flows are rotated to become seaward dipping reflectors.

Volcanic rifted margins are found on the boundary of large igneous provinces. Volcanic margins form when rifting is accompanied by significant mantle melting, with volcanism occurring before and/or during continental breakup. Volcanic rifted margins are characterized by: a transitional crust composed of basaltic igneous rocks, including lava flows, sills, dikes, and gabbros, high volume basalt flows, seaward-dipping reflector sequences of basalt flows that were rotated during the early stages of breakup, limited passive-margin subsidence during and after breakup, and the presence of a lower crust with anomalously high seismic P-wave velocities in lower crustal bodies, indicative of lower temperature, dense media.

=== Hotspots ===
The early volcanic activity of major hotspots, postulated to result from deep mantle plumes, is frequently accompanied by flood basalts. These flood basalt eruptions have resulted in large accumulations of basaltic lavas emplaced at a rate greatly exceeding that seen in contemporary volcanic processes. Continental rifting commonly follows flood basalt volcanism. Flood basalt provinces may also occur as a consequence of the initial hot-spot activity in ocean basins as well as on continents. It is possible to track the hot spot back to the flood basalts of a large igneous province; the table below correlates large igneous provinces with the track of a specific hot spot.

Province	Region	Hotspot	Initial eruptive volume'	Initial Age	Reference
Columbia River Basalt	Northwestern US	Yellowstone hotspot	~210,000 cubic kilometres (50,000 mi^{3})	~17-5 Ma	
Ethiopia-Yemen Flood Basalts	Ethiopia, Yemen	Afar Plume	~350,000 cubic kilometres (84,000 mi^{3})	~30 Ma	
North Atlantic Igneous Province	Northern Canada, Greenland, the Faeroe Islands, Norway, Ireland and Scotland	Iceland hotspot	~5,000,000 cubic kilometres (1,200,000 mi^{3})	~64-55 Ma	
Deccan Traps	India	Réunion hotspot	~1,500,000 cubic kilometres (360,000 mi^{3})	~68.5–66.5 Ma	
Rajmahal Traps	Eastern India	Ninety East Ridge	~439,000 cubic kilometres (105,000 mi^{3})	~118–115 Ma	
Kerguelen Plateau	Indian Ocean	Kerguelen hotspot	~25,000,000 cubic kilometres (6,000,000 mi^{3})	~120 Ma	
Ontong Java Plateau	Pacific Ocean	Louisville hotspot	~50,000,000 cubic kilometres (12,000,000 mi^{3})	~122-120 Ma	
Paraná and Etendeka traps	Brazil–Namibia	Tristan hotspot	~1,000,000 cubic kilometres (240,000 mi^{3})	~130-135 Ma	
Karoo-Ferrar Province	South Africa, Antarctica, Australia & New Zealand	Marion Island	~2,500,000 cubic kilometres (600,000 mi^{3})	~183 Ma	
Caribbean large igneous province	Caribbean-Colombian oceanic plateau	Galápagos hotspot	~4,400,000 cubic kilometres (1,100,000 mi^{3})	~75-72 Ma	
Mackenzie Large Igneous Province	Canadian Shield	Mackenzie hotspot	~3,000,000 cubic kilometres (720,000 mi^{3})	~1.27 billion years ago	

=== Relationship to extinction events ===
Eruptions or emplacements of LIPs appear to have, in some cases, occurred simultaneously with oceanic anoxic events and extinction events. The most important examples are the Deccan Traps (Cretaceous–Paleogene extinction event), the Karoo-Ferrar (Pliensbachian-Toarcian extinction), the Central Atlantic magmatic province (Triassic-Jurassic extinction event), the Siberian Traps (Permian-Triassic extinction event) and the Emeishan Traps (Capitanian mass extinction event)

Several mechanisms are proposed to explain the association of LIPs with extinction events. The eruption of basaltic LIPs onto the earth's surface releases large volumes of sulfate gas, which forms sulfuric acid in the atmosphere; this absorbs heat and causes substantial cooling (e.g., the Laki eruption in Iceland, 1783). Oceanic LIPs can reduce oxygen in seawater by either direct oxidation reactions with metals in hydrothermal fluids or by causing algal blooms that consume large amounts of oxygen.

=== Ore deposits ===
Large igneous provinces are associated with a handful of ore deposit types including:

- Nickel–Copper platinum groups
- Porphyries
- Iron oxide copper gold
- Kimberlite

=== Mercury anomalies ===
Enrichment in mercury relative to total organic carbon (Hg/TOC) is a common geochemical proxy used to detect massive volcanism in the geologic record, although its foolproofness has been called into question.

== Examples ==
Province	Region	Age (million years)	Area (million km^{2})	Volume (million km^{3})	Also known as or includes	Reference
Agulhas Plateau	Southwest Indian Ocean, South Atlantic Ocean, Southern Ocean	140–95	0.3	1.2	Southeast African LIP; Mozambique Ridge, Northeast Georgia Rise, Maud Rise, Astrid Ridge	
Columbia River Basalt	Northwestern US	17–6	0.16	0.175		
Ethiopia-Yemen Flood Basalts	Yemen, Ethiopia	31–25	0.6	0.35	Ethiopia	
North Atlantic Igneous Province	Northern Canada, Greenland, the Faeroe Islands, Norway, Ireland, and Scotland	62–55	1.3	6.6	Jameson Land Thulean Plateau	
Deccan Traps	India	66	0.5–0.8	0.5–1.0		
Madagascar		88				
Rajmahal Traps	India	116				
Ontong Java Plateau	Pacific Ocean	c. 122	1.86	8.4	Manihiki Plateau and Hikurangi Plateau	
High Arctic Large Igneous Province	Svalbard, Franz Josef Land, Sverdrup Basin, Amerasian Basin, and northern Greenland	130-95	> 1.0	0.1		
Paraná and Etendeka traps	Brazil, Namibia	134–129	1.5	> 1	Equatorial Atlantic Magmatic Province Brazilian Highlands	
Karoo-Ferrar Province	South Africa, Antarctica, Australia, and New Zealand	183–180	0.15–2	0.37 - 0.57		
Central Atlantic magmatic province	Northern South America, Northwest Africa, Iberia, Eastern North America	201–197	11	2.5 (2.0–3.0)	CAMP, Newark Supergroup	
Siberian Traps	Russia	250	1.5–3.9	0.9–2.0		
Emeishan Traps	Southwestern China	253–250	0.25	c. 0.3		
Warakurna large igneous province	Australia	1078–1073	1.5		Eastern Pilbara	

=== Large rhyolitic provinces ===
These LIPs are composed dominantly of felsic materials. Examples include:

- Whitsunday
- Sierra Madre Occidental (Mexico)
- Malani
- Chon Aike (Argentina)
- Gawler (Australia)

=== Large andesitic provinces ===
These LIPs are comprised dominantly of andesitic materials. Examples include:

- Island arcs such as Indonesia and Japan
- Active continental margins such as the Andes and the Cascades
- Continental collision zones such as the Anatolia-Iran zone

=== Large basaltic provinces ===
This subcategory includes most of the provinces included in the original LIP classifications. It is composed of continental flood basalts, oceanic flood basalts, and diffuse provinces.

==== Continental flood basalts ====
- Ethiopia-Yemen Continental Flood Basalts
- Columbia River Basalt Group
- Deccan Traps (India)
- Coppermine River Group (Canadian Shield)
- Midcontinent Rift System, Great Lakes Region, North America
- Paraná and Etendeka traps (Paraná, Brazil–NE Namibia)
- Brazilian Highlands
- Río de la Plata Craton (Uruguay)
- Karoo-Ferrar (South Africa–Antarctica)
- Siberian Traps (Russia)
- Emeishan Traps (western China)
- Central Atlantic Magmatic Province (eastern United States and Canada, northern South America, northwest Africa)
- North Atlantic Igneous Province (includes basalts in Greenland, Iceland, Ireland, Scotland, and Faroes)
- High Arctic Large Igneous Province (includes the Ellesmere Island Volcanics, Strand Fiord Formation, Alpha Ridge, Franz Josef Land, and Svalbard)

==== Oceanic flood basalts ====
- Azores Plateau (Atlantic Ocean)
- Wrangellia Terrane (Alaska and Canada)
- Caribbean large igneous province (Caribbean Sea)
- Kerguelen Plateau (Indian Ocean)
- Iceland Plateau (Atlantic Ocean)
- Ontong Java Plateau, Manihiki Plateau and Hikurangi Plateau (southwest Pacific Ocean)
- Jameson Land

=== Large basaltic–rhyolitic provinces ===
- Snake River Plain – Oregon High Lava Plains
- Dongargarh, India

=== Large plutonic provinces ===
- Equatorial Atlantic Magmatic Province

==== Large granitic provinces ====
- Patagonia
- Peru–Chile Batholith
- Coast Range Batholith (northwestern US)

=== Silicic-dominated large igneous provinces ===
- Gawler Range Volcanics
  - Hiltaba Suite
  - Gawler Ranges, South Australia

== See also ==
- Geologic province
- List of flood basalt provinces
- Orogeny
- Volcanic and igneous plumbing systems
