= Franklin dike swarm =

Large geological structure in Canada

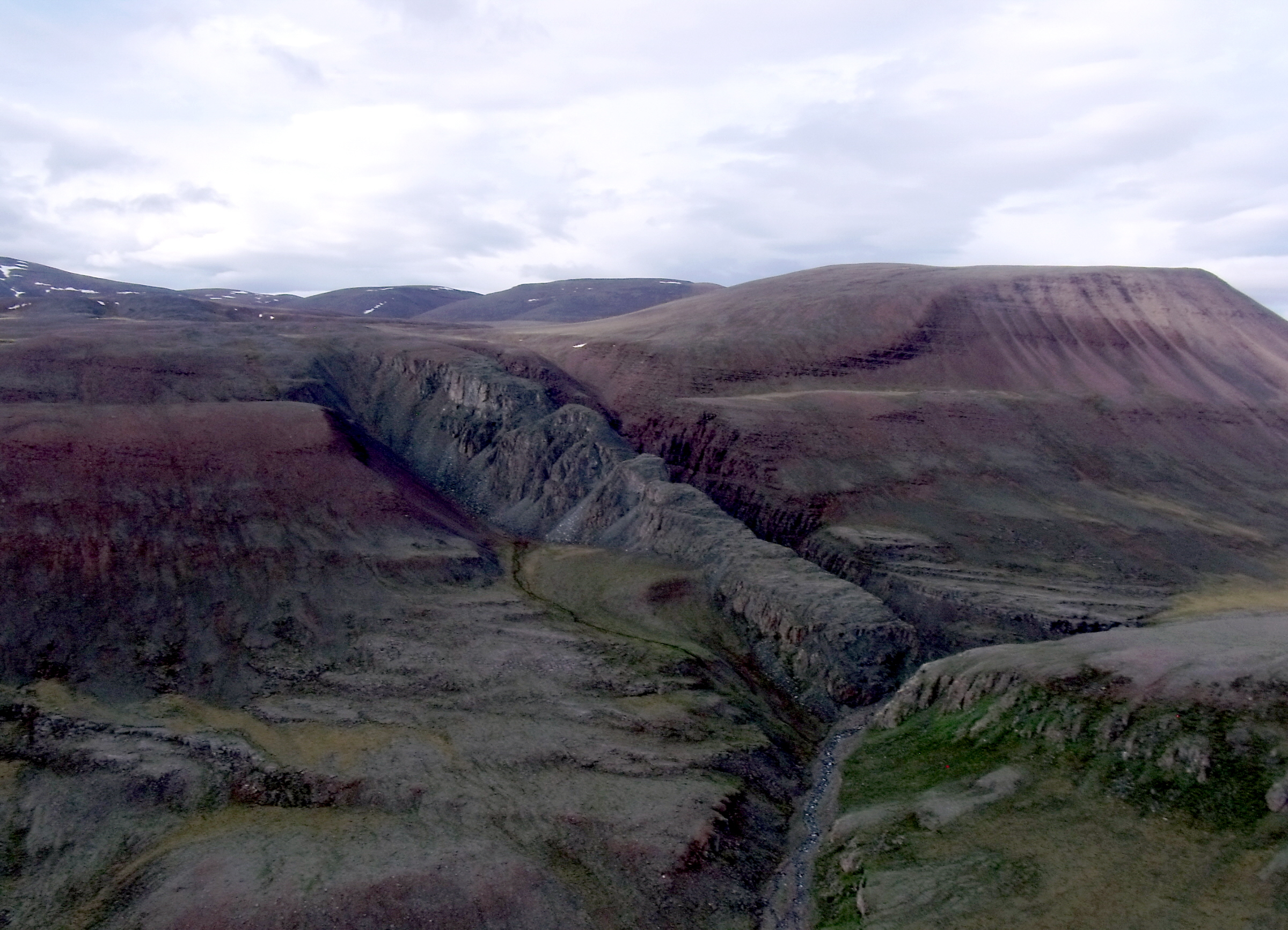
Franklin dike of olivine gabbro intrusive, on northwestern Baffin Island, between Pond Inlet and Arctic Bay.

The Franklin dike swarm, also called the Franklin dikes, is a Proterozoic dike swarm of the Franklin Large Igneous Province in Northern Canada. It is one of the several major magmatic events in the Canadian Shield and it was formed 723 million years ago. Areas in the Franklin have been prospected for nickel, copper, and platinum group metals.

The Franklin dike swarm occupies a major part of the Franklin Large Igneous Province, which covers an area of more than 2,000,000 km^{2} (770,000 sq mi).

== See also ==
- Mackenzie dike swarm
- Volcanism of Canada
- Volcanism of Northern Canada
