= Expedition Formation =

Geological formation in Canada

- Stratigraphic range: Campanian-Maastrichtian; ~82–66 Ma
- Type: Geological formation
- Unit of: Eureka Sound Group
- Sub-units: Hansen Point Volcanics
- Underlies: Strand Bay Formation
- Overlies: Kanguk Formation

Lithology
- Primary: Sandstone, Shale, Lignite
- Other: Conglomerate, Tuff

Location
- Region: Nunavut
- Country: Canada

The Expedition Formation is a Geological Formation in Nunavut whose strata date to the Late Cretaceous. Fossil plant remains have been recovered from the formation.

== Description ==
The Expedition Formation is located within the Sverdrup Basin, a 13 km thick sedimentary unit recording 220 million years of depositional fill. The 4000m thick succession of the Kanguk Formation and Eureka Sound Group records a major change in the formation of the basin during which time the Sverdrup Basin was fragmented into several small, syntectonic basins corresponding to the onset of Eurekan tectonism and the formation of the Canada Basin. The Expedition Formation has been interpreted as a wave-dominated, fluvio-deltaic environment containing peat mires, barrier islands, strandplains and distributary channels.

== Hansen Point Volcanics ==
The Hansen Point Volcanics is a volcanic/sedimentary unit laterally equivalent to the Expedition Formation. Two major facies associations occur here, a bimodal volcanic suite and clastic sedimentary units containing lignite beds.

=== Emma Fiord section ===
Facies include arkosic channel sandstones and conglomerates in a fluvial deposition, lignite beds containing pyroclastics which grade into bituminous shale with numerous closely spaced tree trunks representing a peat mire setting, and fine to course grain sandstone intercalated with lignite containing foliage impressions representing crevasse splay deposits. ^{40}Ar/^{39}Ar dating has yielded ages between 82 and 78 Ma for this section.

=== Philips Inlet region ===
The sediment here is similar to the Emma Fiord section consisting of intercalated volcanics and lignite beds. Units in this section consist of conglomerates, channelized sandstones and bituminous shale/lignite beds. Some conglomerate facies consist of matrix supported conglomerate with angular basaltic grains fining upwards and ending in dark grey shale beds with abundant flattened wood fragments representing a debris flow. Other facies consist of cemented medium sandstone, siltstone and mudstone beds containing siderite representing flood deposits. Other conglomeratic units consist of well sorted clast supported conglomerate grading into coarse to medium sandstone suggesting a well fluvial setting. Sporadic lignite suggest the Philips inlet section was much better drained than the peat mire/floodplain dominated Emma Fiord. The presence of debris flows indicate this section was near a slope perhaps deposited as fans coming down the scarps of the rift. ^{40}Ar/^{39}Ar dating has placed this section near the Maastrichtian-Danian boundary.

== Flora ==
Abundant foliage impressions and fossilised wood have elucidated the vegetation composition of high latitude environments during the Late Cretaceous when greenhouse conditions waned from the Cretaceous Thermal Maximum. At the Emma Fiord section Taxodiaceous conifers represented 79% of the silicified tree trunk specimens recovered with the other 21% being Pinaceous conifers, with other charred fragments suggesting dense forest coverage in at least the peat mire settings. The largest of the Taxodiaceous specimens being a 24 cm diameter trunk, and the largest Pinaceous specimen a 16 cm diameter trunk. The fossil tree trunks bore narrow growth rings with marked boundaries suggested low productivity and periods of arrested growth. Mean ring sensitivity indicated growth under variable stressful environments. Frequent growth interruptions are recorded in the form of false rings, as well as traumatic rings in the Taxodiaceous conifers. Though wildfires are recorded in the form of charcoal, these traumatic rings are interpreted as frost rings due to the occurrence of multiple traumatic rings in single annual growth increments. The greater frost tolerance of Pinaceous conifers may explain why only traumatic rings were found in the Taxodiaceous wood. This along with a deciduous character of the preserved foliage supports the occurrence of depauperate, cool temperate forests at high latitudes during the Late Cretaceous. In contrast the Philips Inlet is even more depauperate in its preserved floral remains, lacking in foliage impressions and only containing Pinaceous tree trunk specimens. These fossil trunks continue to have narrow, well defined growth rings as well as frequent false rings. Mean sensitivity values suggested a less disturbed environment, perhaps due to the more well drained depositional environment and better adaptation to the harsh temperatures.

Color key: Taxon / Reclassified taxon / Taxon falsely reported as present / Dubious taxon or junior synonym / Ichnotaxon / Ootaxon / Morphotaxon	Notes; Uncertain or tentative taxa are in small text; ~~crossed out~~ taxa are discredited.

Taxa	Species	Locality	Material	Notes	Images
Ginkgo	cf. G. adiantoides	Emma Fiord	Leaf impressions.	A Ginkgoalean.	
Parataxodium	P. sp.	Emma Fiord	Abundant foliage casts.	A Taxodioid.	
Piceoxylon	P. ellesmerensis	Emma Fiord	Silicified wood.	Possibly belongs to extant Pseudotsuga.	
Pinuxylon	P. woolardii	Philips Inlet	Silicified wood.	Similar to P. aristata.	
Pinuxylon	P. sp.	Philips Inlet	Silicified wood.	Similar to P. balfouriana.	
Taxodioxylon	T. albertense	Emma Fiord	Silicified wood.	Widely Distributed during the Late Cretaceous.	
Trochodendroides	cf. T. flabella	Emma Fiord	Leaf impressions.	A Katsura.	
