= Volcanism of Northern Canada =

History of volcanic activity in Northern Canada

- Northern Canada, defined politically

Geography
- Location: Yukon, Canada

Geology
- Rock type: Volcanism

Volcanism in Northern Canada has produced hundreds of volcanic areas and extensive lava formations across Northern Canada. The region's different volcano and lava types originate from different tectonic settings and types of volcanic eruptions, ranging from passive lava eruptions to violent explosive eruptions. Northern Canada has a record of very large volumes of magmatic rock called large igneous provinces. They are represented by deep-level plumbing systems consisting of giant dike swarms, sill provinces and layered intrusions.

== Plume and rift complexes ==
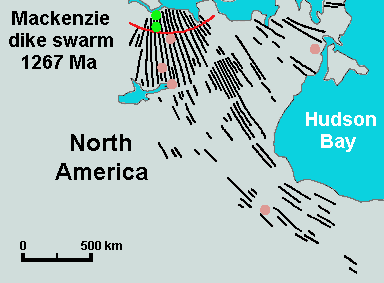
Map of the 1,267-million-year-old Mackenzie dike swarm (black lines). Dots indicate areas where flow direction was determined. The Red arcuate line indicates boundary between vertical flow and horizontal flow.

Vast volumes of basaltic lava covered Northern Canada in the form of a flood basalt event 1,267 million years ago that engulfed the landscape near the Coppermine River southwest of Coronation Gulf in the Canadian Arctic. This volcanic activity built an extensive lava plateau and large igneous province with an area of 170,000 km^{2} (65,637 sq mi) representing a volume of lavas of at least 500,000 km^{3} (119,956 cu mi). With an area of 170,000 km^{2} (65,637 sq mi) and a volume of 500,000 km^{3} (119,956 cu mi), it is larger than the Columbia River Basalt Group in the United States and comparable in size to the Deccan Traps in west-central India, making it one of the largest flood basalt events ever to appear on the North American continent, as well as on Earth.

This massive eruptive event was associated with the Mackenzie magmatic event, that included the coeval, layered, mafic-ultramafic Muskox intrusion and the enormous Mackenzie dike swarm that diverges from the Coppermine River Group flood basalts. The maximum thickness of the flood basalts is 4.7 km (3 mi) and consist of 150 lava flows, each 4 m (13 ft) to 100 m (328 ft) thick. These flood basalt lava flows erupted during a single event that lasted less than five million years. Analysis of the chemical composition of the lavas gives important clues about the origin and dynamics of the flood basalt volcanism. The lowermost lavas were produced by melting in the garnet stability field below the surface at a depth of more than 90 km (56 mi) in a mantle plume environment beneath the North American lithosphere. As the mantle plume intruded rocks of the Canadian Shield, it created an upwelling zone of molten rock known as the Mackenzie hotspot. Upper lavas were partly contaminated with crustal rocks as magmas from the mantle plume passed through the lower and upper crust.

During the Early Jurassic period 196 million years ago, the New England or Great Meteor hotspot existed in the Rankin Inlet area of southern Nunavut along the northwestern coast of Hudson Bay, producing kimberlite magmas. This marks the first appearance of the New England hotspot, as well as the oldest kimberlite eruption throughout the New England or Great Meteor hotspot track, which extends southeastwards across Canada and enters the northern Atlantic Ocean where the New England hotspot is located.

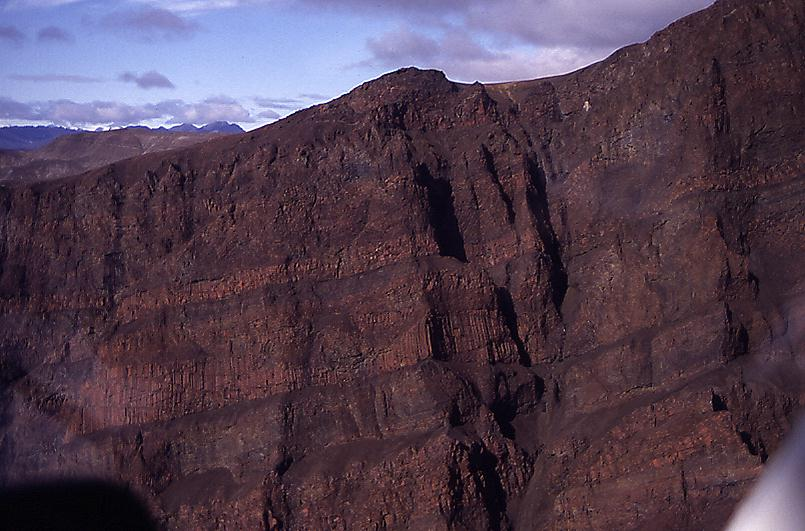
Dragon Cliff on western Axel Heiberg Island is made of flood basalt lava flows of the Strand Fiord Formation.

The Sverdrup Basin Magmatic Province of northern Nunavut forms a large igneous province 95 to 92 million years old in the Canadian Arctic. Part of the larger High Arctic Large Igneous Province, it consists of two volcanic formations called the Ellesmere Island Volcanics and Strand Fiord Formation. In the Strand Fiord Formation, flood basalt lavas reach a thickness of at least 1 km (1 mi). Flood basalts of the Sverdrup Basin Magmatic Province are similar to terrestrial flood basalts associated with breakup of continents, indicating the Sverdrup Basin Magmatic Province formed as a result of rifting of the Arctic Ocean and when the large underwater Alpha Ridge was still geologically active.

Widespread basalt volcanism occurred between 60.9 and 61.3 million years ago in the northern Labrador Sea, Davis Strait and in southern Baffin Bay on the eastern coast of Nunavut during the Paleocene period when North America and Greenland were being separated by tectonic movements. This resulted from seafloor spreading where new ocean seafloor was being created from rising magma. Scientific studies have indicated nearly 80% of the magma was erupted in one million years or less.

The source for this volcanic activity was the Iceland plume along with its surface expression, the Iceland hotspot. This volcanic activity formed part of a large igneous province that is now sunken beneath the northern Labrador Sea. Another period of volcanic activity began in the same region about 55 million years ago during the Eocene period when the north-south trending Mid-Atlantic Ridge began to form under the northern Atlantic Ocean east of Greenland. The cause of this volcanism might be related to partial melting from movement of a transform fault system extending from Labrador Sea to the south and Baffin Bay to the north.

Although the region was carried away from the Iceland plume by continuing plate motion over millions of years, the source of the partial melting for the final period of volcanic activity may have been remnants of still anomalously hot Iceland plume magma which were left stranded beneath the North American lithosphere in the Paleocene period. Most diatremes in the Northwest Territories were formed by volcanic eruptions between 45 and 75 million years ago during the Eocene and Late Cretaceous periods.

The Yukon portion of the northwest trending Northern Cordilleran Volcanic Province includes the youngest volcanoes in Northern Canada. The Fort Selkirk Volcanic Field in central Yukon consists of valley-filling basalt lava flows and cinder cones. Ne Ch'e Ddhawa, a cinder cone 2 km (1 mi) to the connection of the Yukon and Pelly rivers formed between 0.8 and one million years ago when this area lay beneath the vast Cordilleran Ice Sheet.

The youngest volcano, Volcano Mountain just north of the junction of the Yukon and Pelly rivers, formed in the past 10,000 years (Holocene), producing lava flows that remain unvegetated and appear to be only a few hundred years old. However, dating of sediments in a lake impounded by the lava flows indicated that the youngest lava flows could not be younger than mid-Holocene and could be early Holocene or older. Therefore, the most recent activity in the Fort Selkirk volcanic field is unknown. The lava flows from Volcano Mountain are unusual because they originate much deeper in the Earth's mantle than the more common basaltic lava flows found throughout the Yukon and are very uncommon in the geological record. This lava, known as olivine nephelinite, is also unusual because it contains small, angular to rounded fragments of rock called nodules.

== Subduction complexes ==
More recent volcanic activity has created a northwest trending line of volcanic rocks called the Wrangell Volcanic Belt. This volcanic belt lies largely in the U.S. state of Alaska, but extends across the Alaska-Yukon border into southwestern Yukon where it contains scattered remnants of subaerial lavas and pyroclastic rocks which are preserved along the entire eastern fringe of the ice covered Saint Elias Mountains.

The Wrangell Volcanic Belt formed as a result of arc volcanism related to subduction of the Pacific Plate under the northern portion of the North American Plate. Over large areas extrusive rocks lie in flat undisturbed piles on a Tertiary surface of moderate relief. Locally, however, strata of the same age have been affected by a late pulse of tectonism, during which they were faulted, contorted into tight symmetrical folds, or overridden by pre-Tertiary basement rocks along southwesterly dipping thrust faults.

Considerable recent uplift, accompanied by rapid erosion, has reduced once vast areas of upper Tertiary volcanic rocks to small isolated remnants. Although no eruptions have occurred in the Yukon portion of the Wrangell Belt for the past five million years, two large (VEI-6) explosive eruptions from Mount Churchill 24 km (15 mi) west of the Alaska-Yukon border, created the White River Ash deposit. This volcanic ash deposit is estimated 1,890 and 1,250 years old, covering more than 340,000 km^{2} (130,000 sq mi) of northwestern Canada and adjacent eastern Alaska. Unproven legends from indigenous people in the area indicate the final eruption from Mount Churchill 1,250 years ago disrupted food supplies and forced them to move further south.

== See also ==
- Great Bear magmatic zone
- Volcanism of Canada
- Volcanism of Western Canada
- Volcanism of Eastern Canada
- List of volcanoes in Canada
