= Natkusiak Formation =

Rock formations in northern Canada

The Natkusiak Formation, also referred to as the Natusiak flood basalts, is a sequence of Neoproterozoic continental flood basalts of the Franklin Large Igneous Province on Victoria Island, Canada. The flood basalts were erupted about 720 million years ago after uplift began three to five million years prior to the flood basalt volcanism. This uplift and flood basalt volcanism was caused by a mantle plume. This flood basalt sequence is related to the Franklin magmatic event.

== See also ==
- Volcanism of Northern Canada
