= Iceland Plateau =

Plateau in the Atlantic ocean

Coordinates: 68°45′0.3″N 12°22′45.1″W

Topographic map of Iceland and the Atlantic Ocean. The Iceland Plateau is shown as an oval area encircling Iceland.

The Iceland Plateau or Icelandic Plateau is an oceanic plateau in the North Atlantic Ocean consisting of Iceland and its contiguous shelf and marginal slopes. The landscape is constantly experiencing deformation due to the continual addition of magma to the surface and the shifting of the Mid-Atlantic Ridge.

== Location and characteristics ==
The Iceland Plateau is bounded on the south by the Reykjanes Ridge, on the west by the Greenland-Iceland Ridge, on the north by the Kolbeinsey Ridge, and on the east by the Iceland-Faeroe Ridge. It consists of a large igneous province that has been volcanically active since at least the Miocene epoch. The plateau has an average elevation of 1,700 meters above sea level.

The geology of the Icelandic Plateau consists of three layers, closely mimicking the structure of oceanic crust but with one key difference, the second layer of the oceanic crust does not contain piles of lava flow like the Icelandic Plateau does. The first layer is composed of mainly sedimentary rock, the second layer is piles of lava flows, and the third layer is a thick layer of gabbro.

== Tectonics and geology ==
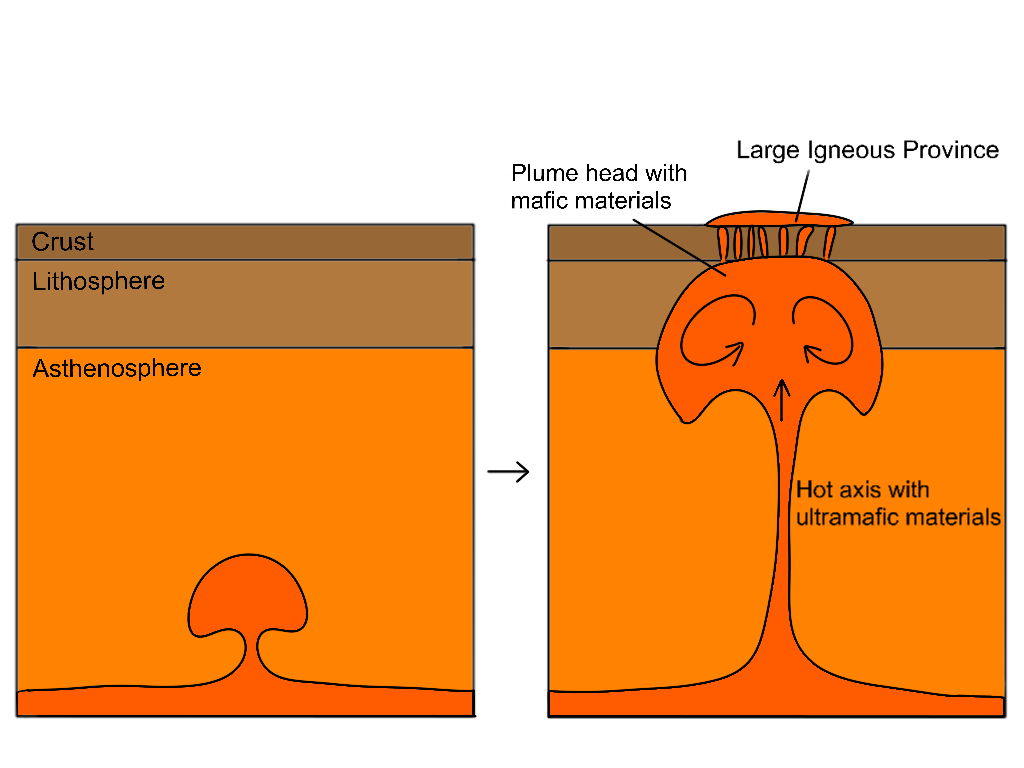
A mantle plume model showing the formation of large igneous provinces, which is present in Iceland

The Icelandic Plateau began forming approximately 56 Ma, due to the opening of the North Atlantic. As the plates began to diverge from each other, piles of lava rose to the surface, creating the ridges present on the landscape currently.

The plateau is an example of ridge-hotspot interaction. The plateau resides above a hot spot on an active rift zone of the Mid-Atlantic Ridge from which extensive tholeiitic plateau basalts and a number of large rhyolitic domes have been extruded.

Today, there are two main parts of the island, one which is slanted towards the sea floor, and another at a level surface.
