= Franklin Large Igneous Province =

Large area of igneous rock in northern North America

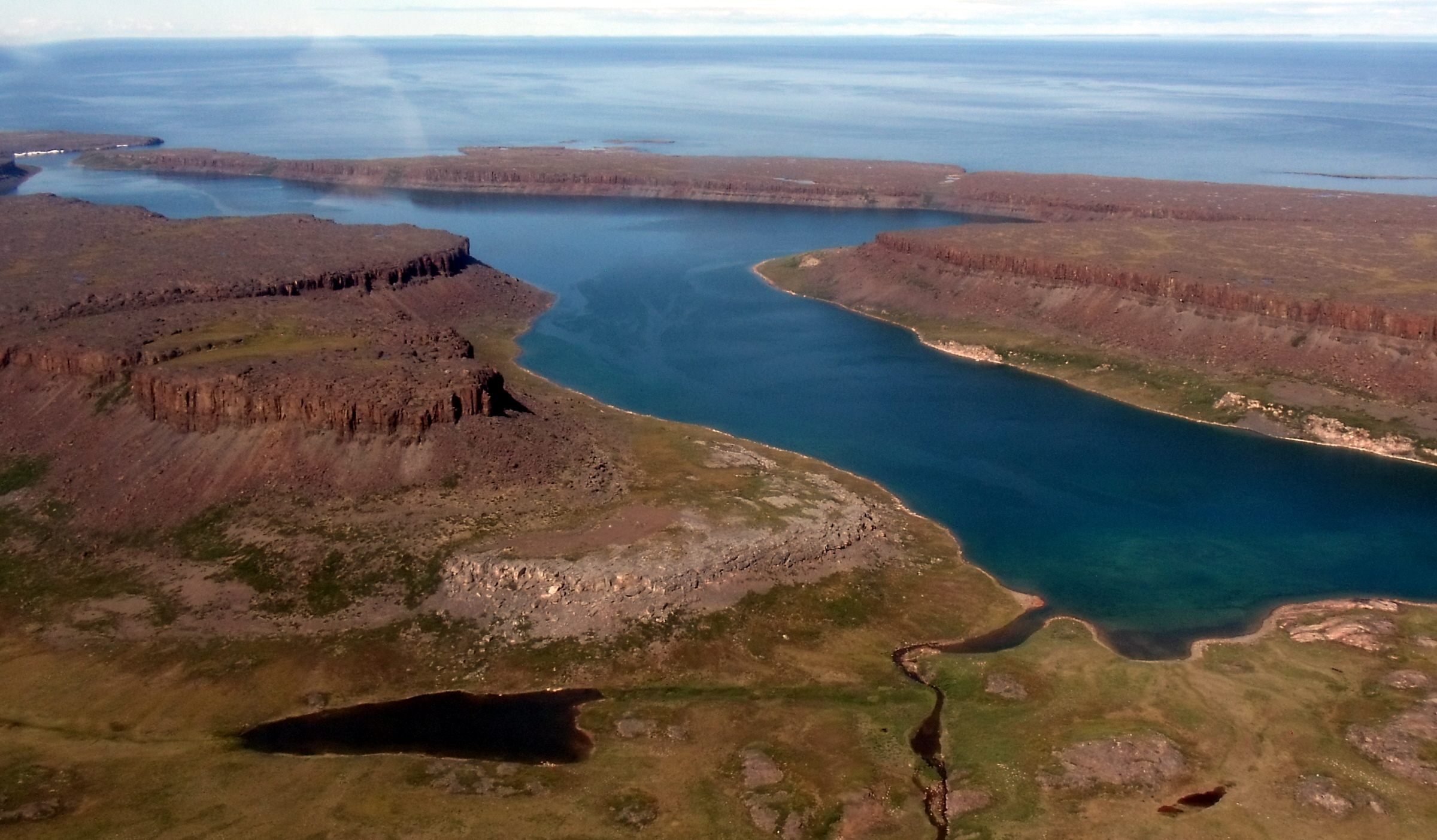
A Neoproterozoic Coronation Sill on the mainland south of Coronation Gulf, east of Kugluktuk. This is just one of dozens of parallel sills slicing through Nunavut's western mainland, each with the same shallow dip to the north. They form a series of ramparts on land and many linear sets of islands out in the ocean.

The Franklin Large Igneous Province (FLIP) is a large igneous province in the Canadian Arctic of Northern Canada. It is one of the most extensive large igneous provinces in Canada, extending for more than 1,200 km (750 mi) across the Canadian Arctic Archipelago and northwestern Greenland. The FLIP covers an area of more than 1,100,000 km^{2} (420,000 mi^{2}). It consists of the Natkusiak flood basalts on Victoria Island, the Coronation sills on the southern shore of the Coronation Gulf and the large Franklin dike swarm.

The FLIP erupted more than 700 million years ago and lasted over the course of around two million years. The eruptions of this province represent one of the largest magmatic episodes in the geological record of Earth and had major effects on its climate. The weathering of the newly created rock increased drawdown of carbon dioxide, possibly cooling the global temperature of Earth enough to begin a period of its history known as snowball Earth.

== History ==
Studies on the U-Pb geochronology in zircon and baddeleyite crystals from sills that are associated with the FLIP show that the emplacement of magma in this province was rapid, occurring around 719.86 ±0.21 and 718.61 ±0.30 million years ago during the Cryogenian period.

== Effects ==
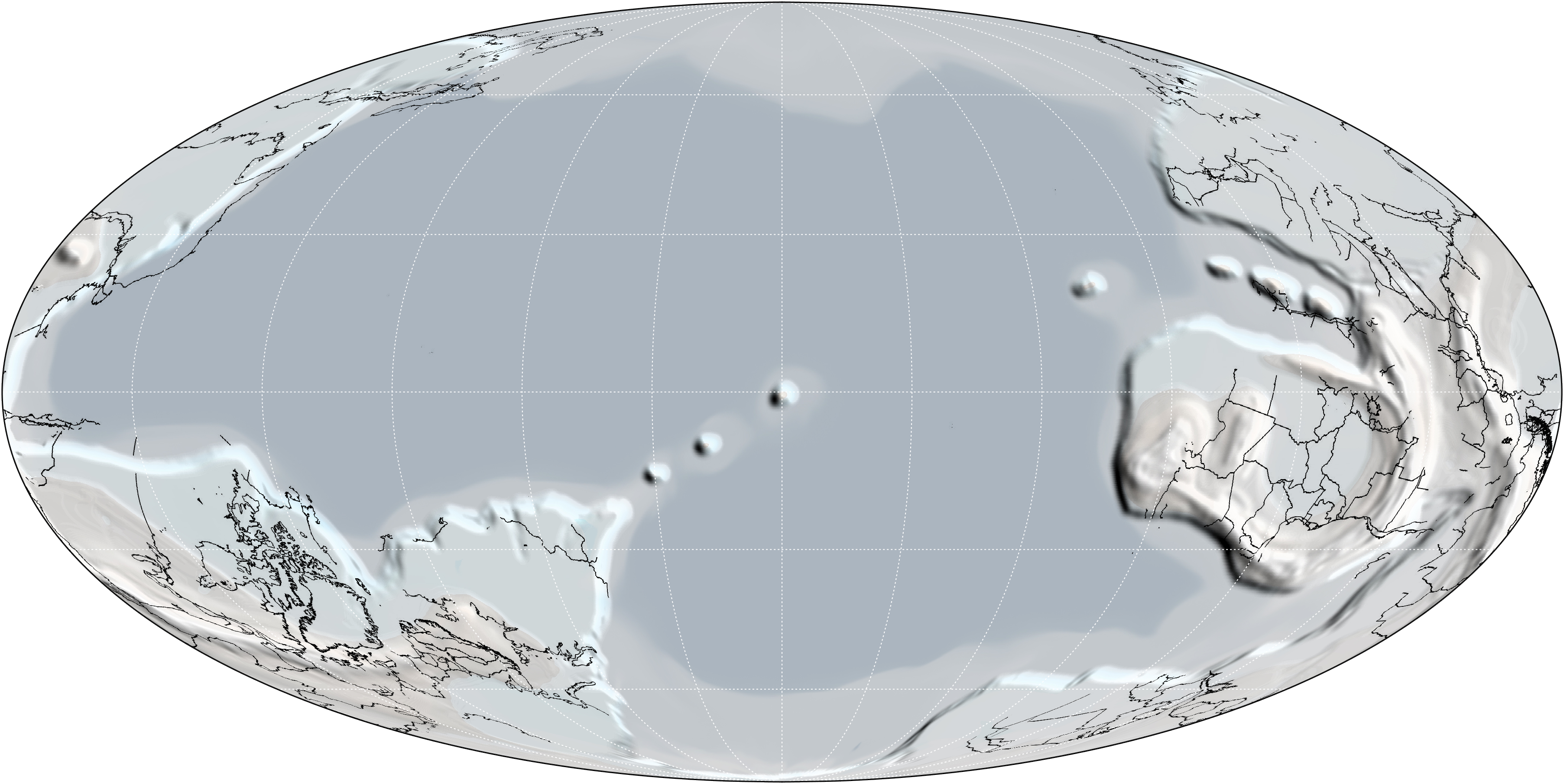
Paleomap (mollweide projection) of the Earth during the Sturtian glaciation around 690 million years ago.

The emplacement of large igneous provinces has been shown to have major effects on the environment of Earth. Many studies have found correlations between major climatic events in Earth's history and the emplacement of large igneous provinces such as the Siberian Traps and the Great Dying at the end of the Permian period, the CAMP eruptions and the Triassic–Jurassic extinction, or the Deccan Traps and the End-Cretaceous. This means that the FLIP likely had significant effects on Earth's climate. The onset of glaciation during the Cryogenian period occurred just 0.9 to 1.6 million years after the emplacement of the FLIP. The periods of glaciation that occurred during the Cryogenian are known as snowball Earth, during which time ice covered the surface of Earth from the polar to equatorial latitudes. There were two major glacial periods that occurred, the Sturtian glaciation which occurred around 717 to 659 million years ago, and the Marinoan glaciation which occurred >639 to 635 million years ago.

The proximity of glaciation and the emplacement of the FLIP possibly suggests that the two events are related. It has been proposed that the drawdown of atmospheric carbon dioxide by increased weathering of newly exposed rock could have then pushed the climate of Earth over the threshold of runaway ice-albedo feedback effects, initiating snowball Earth conditions. Sulfur emissions during the eruption and weathering of the newly formed rock following its formation may have contributed to the Sturtian glaciation. Other large igneous provinces that have formed since this one have not triggered a snowball Earth. This could possibly be due to the background temperature of the climate being too high, coupled with erosional rates being lower.

== See also ==
- Volcanism of Northern Canada
