= Equatorial Atlantic Magmatic Province =

Large igneous province in South America

The Equatorial Atlantic Magmatic Province (EQUAMP) is a Cretaceous large igneous province (LIP) in South America covering 700,000 km^{2} (270,000 sq mi). The break-up of the supercontinent Gondwana resulted in a series of large volcanic eruptions, but EQUAMP is the only Gondwanan LIP composed exclusively of intrusive rock, making it a Large Plutonic Province (LPP).

During the Pan-African-Brasiliano orogenies the São Francisco-Congo craton collided with the West African craton to form the Borborema Province in northeastern Brazil. Neoproterozoic shear zones divide this province into terranes that merged during the formation of West Gondwana (South America and Africa). Intracontinental rifts developed in the early Palaeozoic and when the central Atlantic opened during the late Mesozoic dike swarms and sills were emplaced, including the hundreds of kilometres long Rio Ceará-Mirim dike swarm. These dikes have been dated to 145–110 Ma.

On the Amazonian craton west of the Borborema Province, a sedimentary basin, the 600,000 km^{2} (230,000 sq mi) Parnaíba Basin, covers the shear zones and dikes and partially hides two major magmatic events: the older flood basalts related to the 200 Ma Central Atlantic Magmatic Province and a set of younger sills and dikes.

The 135 Ma Paraná-Etendeka LIP was emplaced during the opening of the South Atlantic and resulted in the Walvis Ridge-Rio Grande Rise hotspot trail. Even though the EQUAMP and Paraná-Etendeka formed under similar circumstances and are roughly coeval, their distinct geochemical compositions indicates different mantle sources for the two events. One possible explanation could be the formation of a triple junction in the South Atlantic during the Cretaceous.
