= Marathon Large Igneous Province =

The Marathon Large Igneous Province is a Paleoproterozoic large igneous province along the southern Superior craton of Ontario, Canada, located around the northern margin of Lake Superior. It consists of three diabase dike swarms known as Marathon, Kapuskasing and Fort Frances. The Kapuskasing and Marathon dike swarms range in age from about 2,126 to 2,101 million years old while the Fort Frances dike swarm is between 2,076 and 2,067 million years old.

A single, periodically active mantle plume was responsible for the creation of the Marathon Large Igneous Province due to the lack of apparent polar wander during the formation of the igneous province. The large magmatic event covers an area of at least 400,000 km^{2} (150,000 sq mi) and the entire large igneous province was constructed in 60 million years.
