= Kanguk Formation =

Geological formation in Canada

- Stratigraphic range: Cenomanian-Maastrichtian; ~99–66 Ma
- Type: Geological formation
- Sub-units: Eglinton Member
- Underlies: Expedition Formation
- Overlies: Hassel Formation
- Thickness: up to 365 metres (1,200 ft)

Lithology
- Primary: Shale, siltstone
- Other: Sandstone, tuff

Location
- Coordinates: 79.24°N 92.36613°W
- Region: Northwest Territories, Nunavut
- Country: Canada

Type section
- Named for: Kanguk Peninsula
- Named by: Souther
- Year defined: 1963
- Kanguk Formation (Canada)

The Kanguk Formation is a geological formation in the Northwest Territories and Nunavut, Canada whose strata date back to the Late Cretaceous. Dinosaur remains are among the fossils that have been recovered from the formation.

It was first described in the Kanguk Peninsula of the Axel Heiberg Island, along the shore of the Stand Fiord by Souther in 1963. The formation occurs throughout the Sverdrup Basin and the southern Queen Elizabeth Islands.

== Lithology ==
The Kanguk Formation is composed of dark shale and siltstone with interbeds of sandstone, bentonite and tuff. Thicker sandstone and conglomerate beds occur in the western reaches in Eglinton Island.

== Fossil content ==
The Kanguk Formation preserves an extensive record of shelf assemblages rich in benthic foraminifera that reveal numerous pulses of local hypoxia. Fish fossils have been unearthed here.

Paleobiota of the Kanguk Formation
Genus	Species	Location	Stratigraphic position	Abundance	Description	Images
Canadaga	C. arctica				A Hesperomithes	
Hesperornis	Indeterminate					
Hadrosauridae	Indeterminate					
Lambeosaurinae	Indeterminate					
Tyrannosauroidea	Indeterminate					
Ornithomimidae	Indeterminate					
Plesiosauroidea	Indeterminate					
Aurorachelys	A. gaffneyi					
Mosasauridae	Indeterminate					
Champsosaurus	Champsosaurus sp.					

== See also ==
- List of dinosaur-bearing rock formations
- Strand Fiord Formation
