= Opening of the North Atlantic Ocean =

Breakup of Pangea

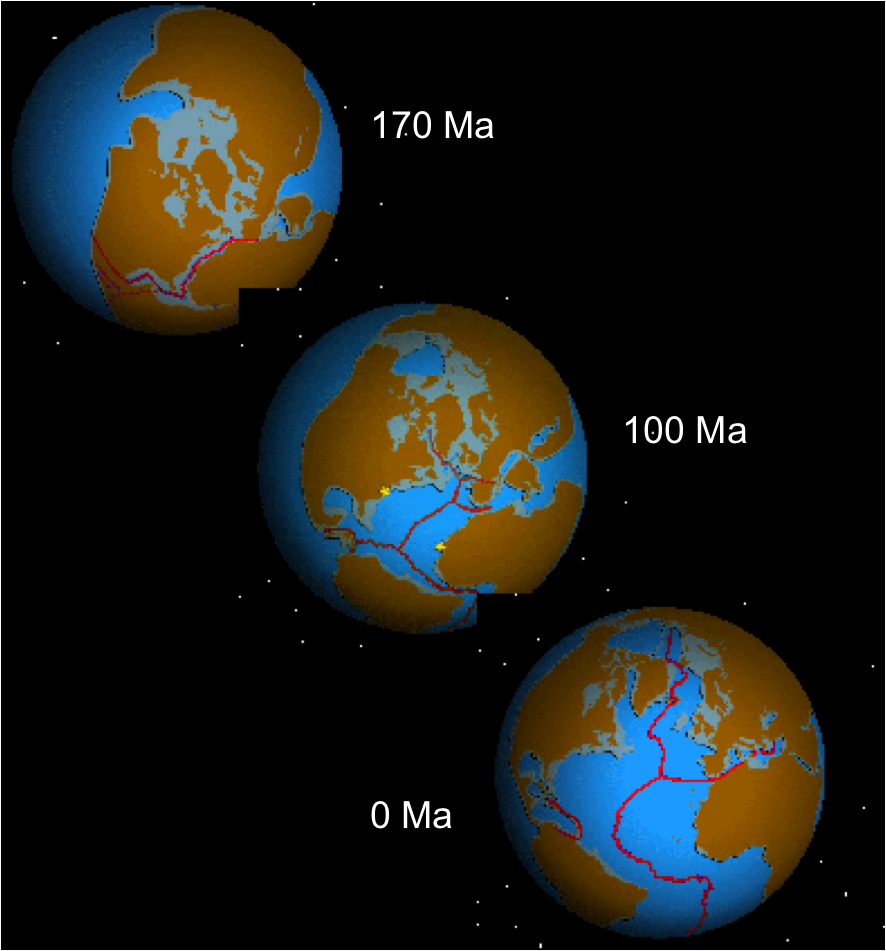
Opening of Central and North Atlantic from 170 Ma to the present

The opening of the North Atlantic Ocean is a geological event that has occurred over millions of years, during which the supercontinent Pangea broke up. As modern-day Europe (Eurasian Plate) and North America (North American Plate) separated during the final breakup of Pangea in the early Cenozoic Era, they formed the North Atlantic Ocean. Geologists believe the breakup occurred either due to primary processes of the Iceland plume or secondary processes of lithospheric extension from plate tectonics.

== Description ==
Animation of the rifting of the supercontinent Pangea

Rocks from the North Atlantic Igneous Province have been found in Greenland, the Irminger Basin, Faroe Islands, Vøring Plateau (off Norway), Faroe-Shetland Basin, Hebrides, Outer Moray Firth and Denmark. The supercontinent known as Pangea existed during the late Paleozoic and early Mesozoic eras and began to rift around 200 million years ago. Pangea had three major phases of breakup.

- The first major phase began in the Early-Middle Jurassic, taking place between North America and Africa.
- The second major phase of breakup began in the Early Cretaceous. The South Atlantic Ocean opened around 140 million years ago as Africa separated from South America, and about the same time, India separated from Antarctica and Australia, forming the central Indian Ocean.
- The final major phase of breakup occurred in the early Cenozoic, as Laurentia separated from Eurasia. As the two plates broke free from each other, the Atlantic Ocean continued to expand.

=== Iceland plume theory ===
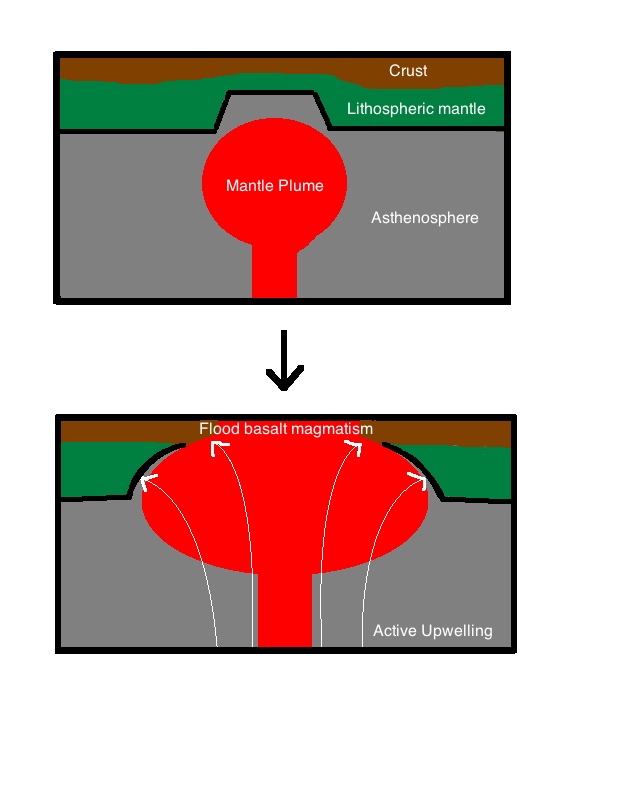
Plume hypothesis for continental breakup. Active upwelling heats and weakens crust and creates magmatism.

The Iceland plume is a mantle plume under Iceland that carries hot material from deep within the Earth's mantle upwards to the crust. The rising hot material weakens the lithosphere, making the separation of plates easier. The flow of hot plume material creates volcanism under the continental lithosphere. Iceland extends across the Mid-Atlantic Ridge. The Mid-Atlantic Ridge is a divergent plate boundary, and it separates the Eurasian and North American plates. The ages of the earliest volcanic rocks from this plume lie in the late Paleocene, and both sides of the Atlantic Ocean contain these rocks. Since these rocks have been dated to the late Paleocene, this lines up with the time of breakup of the North Atlantic continent, so some think it could have been a contributing factor.

=== Plate tectonics ===
This theory views volcanism as the resultant of lithospheric processes rather than heat from the mantle rising up. Instead of heat coming up from deep in the mantle, volcanic anomalies come from a shallow source. Volcanism thus occurs where the crust is easier to break up because it has been stretched by lithospheric extension, allowing melt to reach the surface. Volcanic anomalies are created by plate tectonics such as spreading plate boundaries or subduction zones. The location of the volcanism is governed by the stress field in the plate and the amount of melt is governed by the fusibility of the mantle beneath. Plate tectonics can explain most of the volcanism on Earth.

== Active vs. passive plates ==
Active rifting, such as is formed by the Iceland plume, is driven by hotspot or mantle plume activity. From deep within the Earth, hot mantle rises to force doming of the crust. This causes thinning of the crust and lithosphere, then melting and underplating occur. Finally, there is rifting at the crest of the domed crust and volcanism occurs. In passive rifting, driven by plate tectonics, the crust and lithosphere extend as a result of plate boundary forces such as slab pull. Far field stresses thin the crust and lithospheric mantle, and hot asthenospheric mantle passively enters the thinned area. The upwelling of asthenosphere is not involved in the actual rifting process. The upward flow of the asthenosphere results in decompression melting, magmatic underplating and some volcanism that may occur in the rift area.
