= Barents Sea dike swarm =

Large geological structure

Coordinates: 80°N 40°E

The Barents Sea dike swarm is a dike swarm in the northern Barents Sea. It consists of two groups of dolerite dikes across the Svalbard and Franz Josef Land regions. The emplacement of dikes was associated with the Cretaceous High Arctic Large Igneous Province (HALIP).

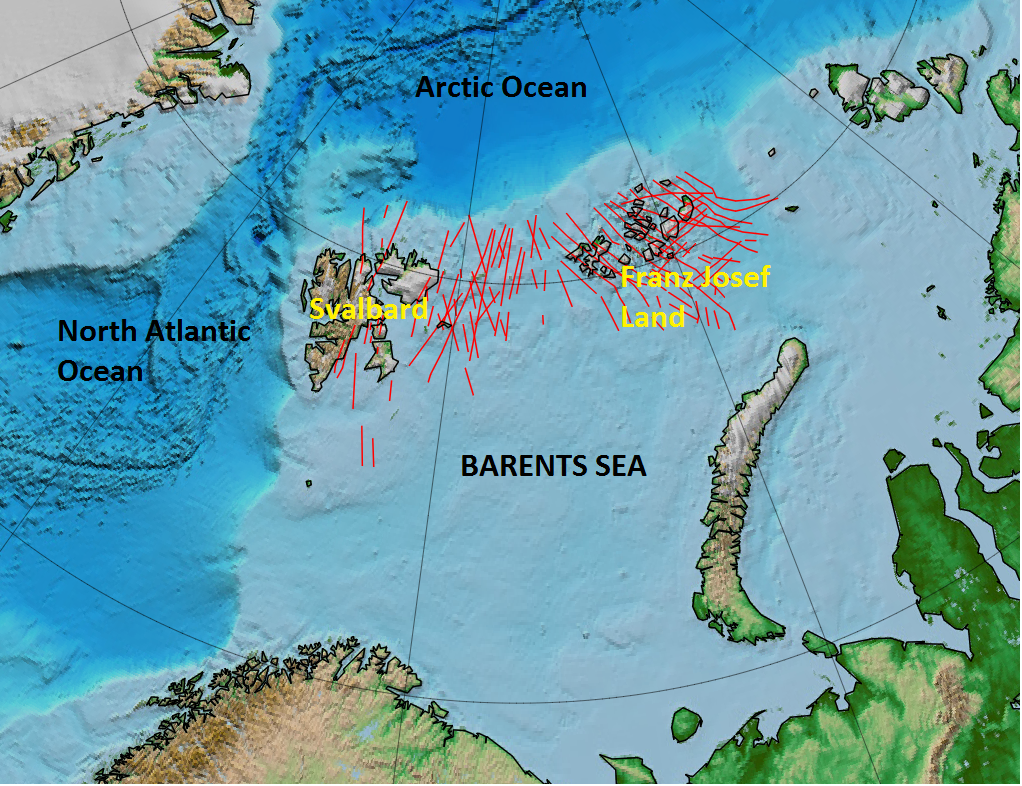
Barents Sea dike swarm

== Description ==
As revealed by aeromagnetic data, the dolerite dikes in the northern Barents Sea can be grouped in two regional dike swarms running oblique to the northern passive margin of the Barents Sea: the Franz Josef Land and Svalbard dike swarms, respectively. Multichannel seismic data indicate that the dikes fed the dolerite sills, resided in Permian to Early Cretaceous sedimentary strata in the East Barents Sea sedimentary basin. U/Pb dating of dolerites indicates an emplacement age of 121 - 125 Ma.
