= Sub-Paleogene surface =

The Sub-Paleogene surface is an ancient erosion surface that exists in southern England. In parts the Sub-Paleogene surface appears as tilted plain and parts as an unconformity beneath sediments of Paleogene age. The surface was formed by the erosion of chalklands in England following a regression in the Maastrichtian age. The time during which the surface formed has been estimated by comparing the age of the last Maastrichtian chalk to deposit and the age of the earliest Paleogene sediment to cover the surface. This yields a bracket between 71–73 million years ago (Mya) and 59.3 Mya.

The cause of the regression and hence of the erosion above sea level has been debated. It has been linked to eustatic sea level change, the Alpine orogeny and —more recently— to the Iceland plume.

The surface was formerly known as Sub-Eocene surface until it was discovered that some sediments overlying the surface were in fact Paleogene.

== See also ==
- Cretaceous–Paleogene boundary
- Sub-Mesozoic hilly peneplains
- Utsira High
