= Dragon Cliff =

Basaltic monolith on Axel Heiberg Island, Nunavut, Canada

Coordinates: 79°21′N 092°12′W

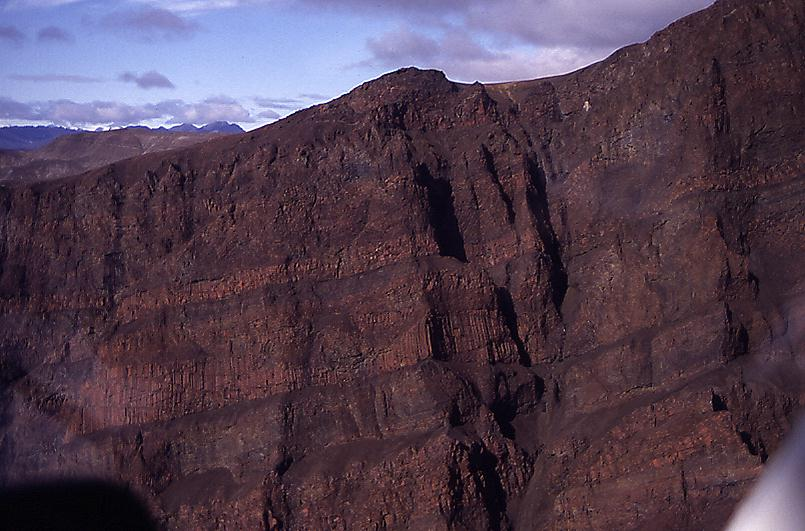
Dragon Cliff, including the flood basalt lava layers

Dragon Cliff is a basaltic monolith located on western Axel Heiberg Island, Nunavut, Canada. It is the most striking feature of Expedition Fiord and rises several hundred metres out of the fiord. Dragon Cliff is made of flood basalt lava flows that contain more than 10 flow units totalling over 200 m (660 ft) of stratigraphic thickness. It is part of the Albian Strand Fiord Formation, which in turn forms part of the High Arctic Large Igneous Province. The Strand Fiord Formation is interpreted to represent the cratonward extension of the Alpha Ridge.

== See also ==
- Volcanism in Canada
