= Ellesmere Island Volcanics =

Late Cretaceous volcanic group in Ellesmere Island, Nunavut, Canada

Coordinates: 81.9519°N 86.8385°W

The Ellesmere Island Volcanics are a Late Cretaceous volcanic group of volcanoes and lava flows in the Qikiqtaaluk Region of northern Ellesmere Island, Nunavut, Canada.

Ellesmere Island Volcanics are part of the Arctic Cordillera. This volcanic province is among the northernmost volcanism on Earth.

== History ==
Even though these volcanics are about 90 million years old, the volcanoes and cinder are still discernible. The volcanics of the Maskell Inlet Assemblage are mostly made up of tuffs, with smaller flows. Compositionally these are mostly andesite or undifferentiated andesite and basalt.

The volcanics on Ellesmere Island has been uncertainly associated to both the early volcanic activity of the Iceland hotspot and the Alpha Ridge. The Ellesmere Island Volcanics are part of the High Arctic Large Igneous Province.

== See also ==
- Volcanism of Canada
- Volcanism of Northern Canada
- List of volcanoes in Canada
- Strand Fiord Formation
- Iceland plume
