= Strand Fiord Formation =

Late Cretaceous volcanic component on Axel Heiberg Island, Nunavut, Canada

- Stratigraphic range: Late Cretaceous
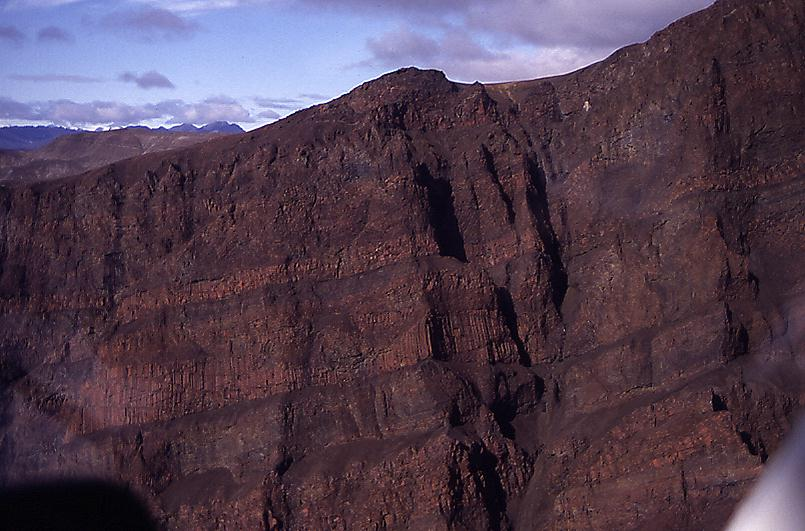
- Dragon Cliff, including the flood basalt lava layers
- Type: Geological formation
- Underlies: Kanguk Formation
- Overlies: Bastion Ridge Formation

Lithology
- Primary: Sill
- Other: Pyroclastic flow

Location
- Coordinates: 79°13′52″N 91°52′08″W
- Region: Nunavut
- Country: Canada

Type section
- Named for: Strand Fiord
- Named by: Souther, 1963

The Strand Fiord Formation is a Late Cretaceous volcanic component, located on northwestern and west-central Axel Heiberg Island, Nunavut, Canada. The formation contains flood basalts which are found on western Axel Heiberg Island at Dragon Cliff 300 m (980 ft) tall.

The Strand Fiord Formation contains columnar jointing units that are usually 1 to 3 m (3 to 10 ft) in diameter. The formation is interpreted to represent the cratonward extension of the Alpha Ridge, a volcanic ridge that was active during the formation of the Amerasia Basin. The Strand Fiord Formation is also part of the High Arctic Large Igneous Province.

== See also ==
- Volcanism of Northern Canada
- List of volcanoes in Canada
- Ellesmere Island Volcanics
