= Winagami sill complex =

The Winagami sill complex, also called the Winagami sills, is a Paleoproterozoic large igneous province of northwestern Alberta, Canada. It consists of a series of related sills that were formed between 1.89 and 1.76 billion years ago. The Winagami sill complex covers an area of 120,000 km^{2} (46,000 sq mi).
