= High Arctic Large Igneous Province =

Cretaceous large igneous province in the Arctic

Coordinates: 79°26′56″N 11°23′44″E

Provinces of the HALIP
Location (formal name)	Extent (km^{2})	Age (Ma)
Svalbard (Diabasodden Suite)	750,000	124.5
Franz Josef Land	750,000	116.5
Barents Sea	15–20,000	Unknown
Canadian Arctic Archipelago, Queen Elizabeth Islands (Sverdrup Basin Magmatic Province)	550,000	90–130
Peary Land, Northern Greenland (Kap Washington Group)	80,000	130–80
Alpha Ridge, Amerasian Basin	200,000	97–79
De Long Islands/Bennett Island	228	124–109

The High Arctic Large Igneous Province (HALIP) is a Cretaceous large igneous province in the Arctic. The region is divided into several smaller magmatic provinces. Svalbard, Franz Josef Land, Sverdrup Basin, Amerasian Basin, and northern Greenland (Peary Land) are some of the larger divisions. Today, HALIP covers an area greater than 1,000,000 km^{2} (390,000 mi^{2}), making it one of the largest and most intense magmatic complexes on the planet. However, eroded volcanic sediments in sedimentary strata in Svalbard and Franz Josef Land suggest that an extremely large portion of HALIP volcanics have already been eroded away.

== Geologic evolution ==
The HALIP event lasted from 130 million years ago to approximately 60 million years ago. During its active period, there were two distinct phases of volcanism. The first phase lasted from 130 million years ago to 80 million years ago and was characterized by tholeiitic igneous activity. During this time, numerous dikes and sills formed, and there were eruptions of basaltic flow. The basalts formed at this time are relatively rich in TiO_{2} and have a similar composition to continental flood basalts. The second phase lasted from approximately 85 million years ago to 60 million years ago and was characterized by mildly alkaline igneous activity and the eruption of flood basalts. The igneous rocks formed during the second phase have a similar geochemical makeup as the intra-plate composition.

The Arctic Ocean is a few hundred million years old, making it the youngest ocean on Earth. In the Precambrian, when the Arctic was located south of the Equator, the continent Arctica (or Arctida) filled the gap between the cratons that today surround the Arctic region. Arctica rifted apart in the Late Precambrian (950 Ma) and was reassembled in a new configuration in the Late Paleozoic (255 Ma).

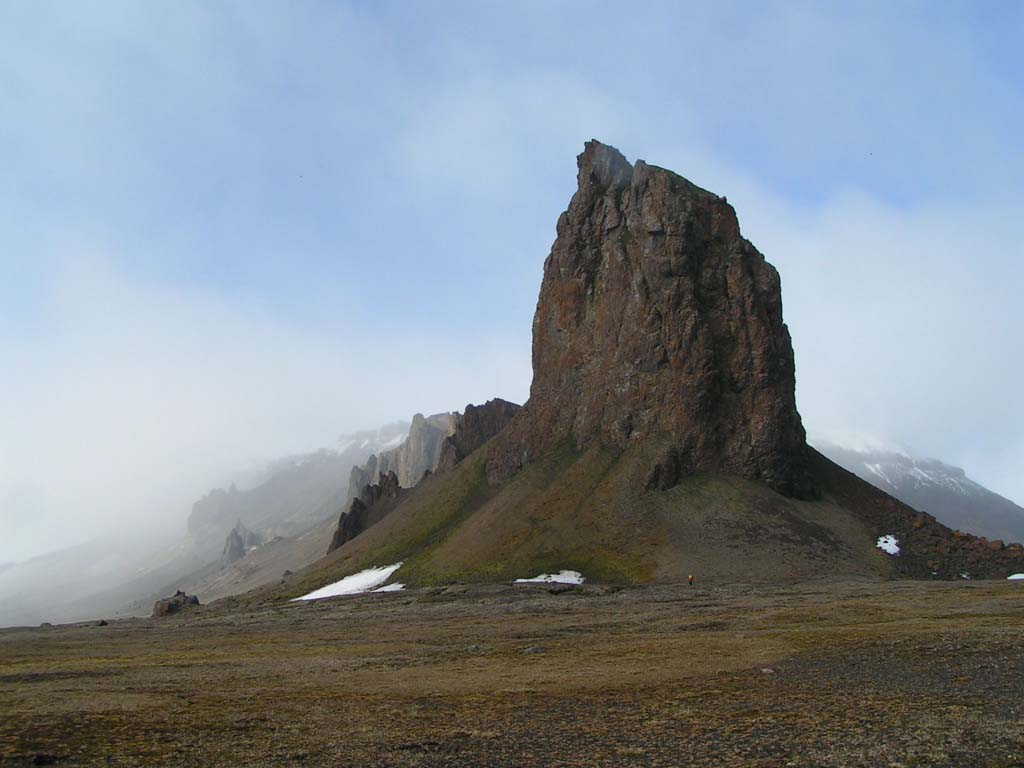
Cape Tegethoff, a basaltic headland of Franz Josef Land

During the Jurassic–Cretaceous this second continent, known as Pangea, broke apart, opening the Amerasian Basin and the Arctic Ocean. HALIP dispersed the components of this second continent around the margins of the Arctic Ocean where they are now terranes and microplates embedded into fold belts or overlain by sediments. As the Atlantic and Arctic oceans opened during the Mesozoic and into the Cenozoic, the Arctic Region underwent several stages of rifting, sedimentation, and magmatism.

Dolerites collected from Svalbard and elsewhere in the Arctic are mafic intra-plate tholeiites characteristic of HALIP, which indicated that the LIP formed during the opening of the Arctic Ocean around 148–70 Ma. Seismic and magnetic analyses of the seafloor produced ages of 118–83 Ma.

The HALIP is widely thought to have originated from a mantle plume, and the igneous activity of the province often tracked along a similar path as the Icelandic hotspot.

== Magmatic provinces ==
The HALIP is divided into several magmatic provinces. These provinces are divided by location, igneous rock composition, and the formations present.

=== Svalbard ===
In the Svalbard province, the HALIP is expressed as an extensive system of alkaline intrusive doleritic rocks. The intrusions largely appear in the form of sills that can reach thicknesses of 100 m (330 ft) and continuously extend for up to 30 km (19 mi) laterally. The basaltic rocks found in Svalbard have an intra-plate composition and are thought to originate from a source near the Alpha Ridge. The Svalbard province is also closely associated with the Franz Josef Land province (discussed below). The two provinces combined cover an area of approximately 750,000 km^{2} (290,000 mi^{2}).

=== Franz Josef Land ===
The Franz Josef Land province is closely associated with the Svalbard province. Franz Josef Land is located approximately 300 km (190 mi) east of Svalbard and contains igneous rocks of very similar composition to those of Svalbard. However, the archipelago is scattered with a prominent swarm of southeast trending dikes. Extensive sills and volcanic flows can also be found in the region, as well as a few dikes of other trends. The timing of the Franz Josef Land formations and the Svalbard formations is thought to be nearly identical, furthering the evidence for a large initial plume head model for the HALIP.

=== Sverdrup Basin ===
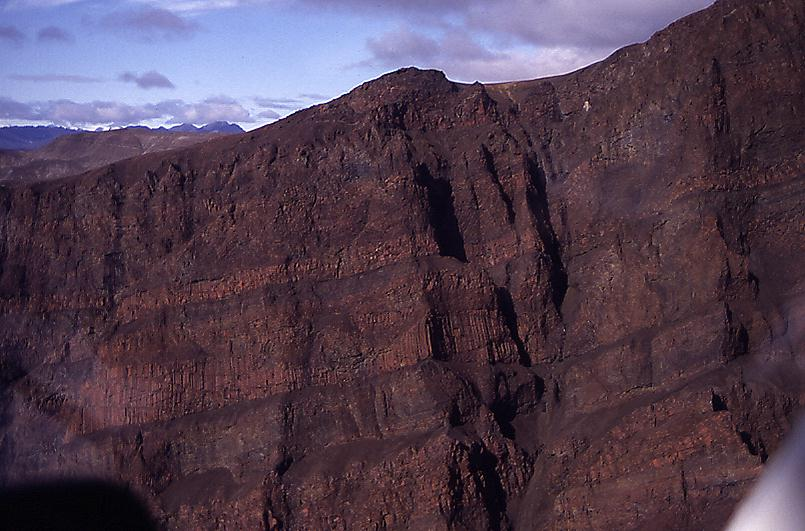
Flood basalt layers exposed in Dragon Cliff on western Axel Heiberg Island, Nunavut, Canada

The Sverdrup Basin province spreads across the Canadian Arctic Islands. The region is characterized by the presence of a radiating dike swarm across the Queen Elizabeth Islands that seems to suggest the presence of a mantle plume beneath the Alpha Ridge. This province contains igneous rocks of both tholeiitic and alkaline composition. There are also a respectable number of sills and flood basalts in the province. The flood basalts in the Canadian Arctic Islands are similar to those of the Columbia River flood basalts in the Pacific Northwest of the United States. The Sverdrup Basin Magmatic Province covers an area of 550,000 km^{2} (210,000 mi^{2}).

=== Amerasian Basin ===
The Amerasian Basin's most prominent feature is the Alpha Ridge – which is thought to be the location of the mantle plume that fed the HALIP. The ridge reaches a height of 2,700 m (8,900 ft) from the seafloor. Also in the region are a few basaltic dikes. The Amerasian Basin extends over 200,000 km^{2} (77,000 mi^{2}).

=== Northern Greenland (Peary Land) ===
The northern Greenland province, also known as Peary Land, contains three dike swarms. The Nansen Land swarm trends SSE–SE and is the oldest of the swarms. The middle-aged swarm is known as the Erlandsen Swarm and trends SE–ESE. The J. P. Koch Swarm is the youngest of the three and trends eastward. The two younger swarms tend to have igneous rocks of alkaline composition, while the Nansen Land swarm tends to have more tholeiitic composition. The Peary Land province covers an area of over 80,000 km^{2} (31,000 mi^{2}).

=== Barents Sea ===
The Barents Sea province is characterized by igneous intrusions with much similarity to Svalbard and Franz Josef Land. This region is well known for being petroleum-rich. The Barents Sea province covers an area of 15,000 to 20,000 km^{2} (5,800 to 7,700 sq mi).

== Climatic impact ==
The HALIP, along with other large igneous provinces, is thought to have caused global warming that led to the Cenomanian-Turonian extinction event. Late Cretaceous (92–86 Ma) vertebrates, including 2.4 m (7.9 ft) long champsosaurs, a crocodile-like reptile, found in the Canadian Arctic suggests that polar climate was much warmer during the Cretaceous when average annual temperature must have exceeded 14 °C.

The BLIP intrusions could have released perhaps 9,000 Gt (8.9×10^{12} long tons; 9.9×10^{12} short tons) of carbon from the contact aureoles which could have triggered the Aptian oceanic anoxic event (OAE1a) at 120 Ma.

== See also ==
- Volcanism of Northern Canada
