= Iceland hotspot =

Hotspot partly responsible for volcanic activity forming the Iceland Plateau and island

Coordinates: 64.4000°N 17.3000°W

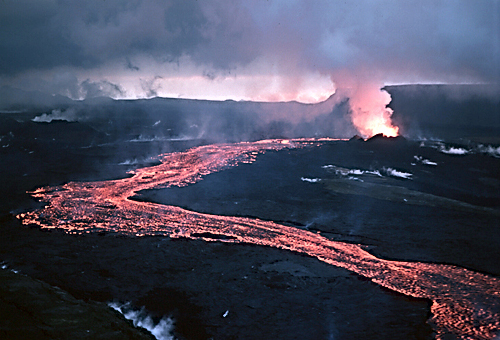
Eruption at Krafla, 1984

Active volcanic areas and systems in Iceland

The Iceland hotspot is a hotspot that is partly responsible for the high volcanic activity that has formed the Iceland Plateau and the island of Iceland. It contributes to understanding the geological deformation of Iceland.

Iceland is one of the most active volcanic regions in the world, with eruptions occurring on average roughly every three years (in the 20th and 21st century until 2010 there were 45 volcanic eruptions on and around Iceland). About a third of the basaltic lavas erupted in recorded history have been produced by Icelandic eruptions. Notable eruptions have included that of Eldgjá, a fissure of Katla, in 934 (the world's largest basaltic eruption ever witnessed), Laki in 1783 (the world's second largest), and several eruptions beneath ice caps, which have generated devastating glacial bursts, most recently in 2010 after the eruption of Eyjafjallajökull.

Iceland's location astride the Mid-Atlantic Ridge, where the Eurasian and North American Plates are moving apart, is partly responsible for this intense volcanic activity, but an additional cause is necessary to explain why Iceland is a substantial island while the rest of the ridge mostly consists of seamounts, with peaks below sea level.

As well as being a region of higher temperature than the surrounding mantle, the hotspot is believed to have a higher concentration of water. The presence of water in magma reduces the melting temperature, which may also play a role in enhancing Icelandic volcanism.

== Theories of causation ==
There is an ongoing discussion about whether the hotspot is caused by a deep mantle plume or originates at a much shallower depth. Recently, seismic tomography studies have found seismic wave speed anomalies under Iceland, consistent with a hot conduit 100 km (62 mi) across that extends to the lower mantle.

Foulger et al. believe the Icelandic plume reaches only to the mantle transition layer and can therefore not come from the same source as Hawaii. Bijwaard and Spakman, however, believe the Icelandic plume does reach to the mantle, and therefore comes from the same source as Hawaii.

=== Mantle plume theory ===
The Iceland plume is a postulated upwelling of anomalously hot rock in the Earth's mantle beneath Iceland. Its origin is thought to lie deep in the mantle, perhaps at the core–mantle boundary at about 2,880 km (1,790 mi) depth. Opinions differ as to whether seismic studies have imaged such a structure. In this framework, the volcanism of Iceland is attributed to this plume, according to the theory of W. Jason Morgan.

It is believed that a mantle plume underlies Iceland, of which the hotspot is thought to be the surface expression, and that the presence of the plume enhances the volcanism already caused by plate separation. Additionally, flood basalts on the continental margins of Greenland and Norway, the oblique orientation of the Reykjanes Ridge segments to their spreading direction, and the enhanced igneous crustal thickness found along the southern Aegir and Kolbeinsey ridges may be results of interaction between the plume and the Mid-Atlantic Ridge. The plume stem is believed to be quite narrow, perhaps 100 km (62 mi) across and extending down to at least 400–650 km (250–400 mi) beneath the Earth's surface, and possibly down to the core-mantle boundary, while the plume head may be greater than 1,000 km (620 mi) in diameter.

While the Hawaiian island chain and the Emperor Seamounts show a clear time-progressive volcanic track caused by the movement of the Pacific Plate over the Hawaiian hotspot, no such clear track can be seen at Iceland. It is proposed that the line from Grímsvötn volcano to Surtsey shows the movement of the Eurasian Plate, and the line from Grímsvötn volcano to the Reykjanes volcanic belt shows the movement of the North American Plate. It has been suggested that the lack of a time-progressive track of seamounts may be due to the location of the plume beneath the thick Greenland craton (Laurentia) for ~ 15 Myr after continental breakup, and the later entrenchment of the plume material into the northern Mid-Atlantic Ridge following its formation.

==== Geological history ====
According to the plume model, the source of Icelandic volcanism lies deep beneath the center of the island. The earliest volcanic rocks attributed to the plume are found on both sides of the Atlantic. Their ages have been determined to lie between 64 and 58 million years. This coincides with the opening of the north Atlantic in the late Paleocene and early Eocene, which has led to suggestions that the arrival of the plume was linked to, and has perhaps contributed to, the breakup of Laurasia. In the framework of the plume hypothesis, the volcanism was caused by the flow of hot plume material initially beneath thick continental lithosphere and then beneath the lithosphere of the growing ocean basin as rifting proceeded. The exact position of the plume at that time is a matter of disagreement between scientists, as is whether the plume is thought to have ascended from the deep mantle only at that time or whether it is much older and also responsible for the old volcanism in northern Greenland, on Ellesmere Island, and at Alpha Ridge in the Arctic.

As the northern Atlantic opened to the east of Greenland during the Eocene, North America and Eurasia drifted apart; the Mid-Atlantic Ridge formed as an oceanic spreading center and a part of the submarine volcanic system of mid-oceanic ridges. The initial plume head may have been several thousand kilometers in diameter, and it erupted volcanic rocks on both sides of the present ocean basin to produce the North Atlantic Igneous Province. Upon further opening of the ocean and plate drift, the plume and the mid-Atlantic Ridge are postulated to have approached one another, and finally met. The excess magmatism that accompanied the transition from flood volcanism on Greenland, Ireland and Norway to present-day Icelandic activity was the result of ascent of the hot mantle source beneath progressively thinning lithosphere, according to the plume model, or a postulated unusually productive part of the mid-ocean ridge system. Some geologists have suggested that the Iceland plume could have been responsible for the Paleogene uplift of the Scandinavian Mountains by producing changes in the density of the lithosphere and asthenosphere during the opening of the North Atlantic. To the south the Paleogene uplift of the English chalklands that resulted in the formation of the Sub-Paleogene surface has also been attributed to the Iceland plume.

An extinct ridge exists in western Iceland, leading to the theory that the plume has shifted east with time. The oldest crust of Iceland is more than 20 million years old and was formed at an old oceanic spreading center in the Westfjords (Vestfirðir) region. The westward movement of the plates and the ridge above the plume and the strong thermal anomaly of the latter caused this old spreading center to cease 15 million years ago and lead to the formation of a new one in the area of today's peninsulas Skagi and Snæfellsnes; in the latter there is still some activity in the form of the Snæfellsjökull volcano. The spreading center, and hence the main activity, shifted eastward again 9 to 7 million years ago and formed the current volcanic zones in the south–west (Reykjanes, Hofsjökull) and north–east (Tjörnes). Presently, a slow decrease of the activity in the north–east takes place, while the volcanic zone in the south–east (Katla, Vatnajökull), which was initiated 3 million years ago, develops. The reorganisation of the plate boundaries in Iceland has also been attributed to microplate tectonics, and an independent Hreppar microplate exists.

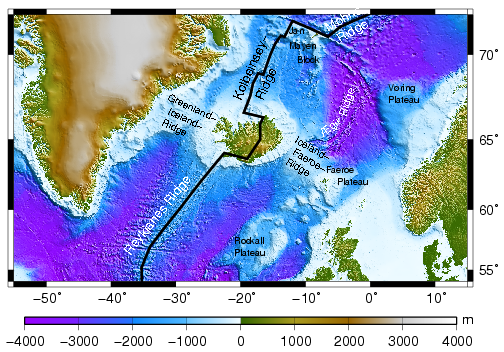
Topography/bathymetry of the north Atlantic around Iceland

=== Challenges to the plume model ===
The weak visibility of the postulated plume in tomographic images of the lower mantle and the geochemical evidence for eclogite in the mantle source have led to the theory that Iceland is not underlain by a mantle plume at all, but that the volcanism there results from processes related to plate tectonics and is restricted to the upper mantle.

==== Subducted ocean plate ====
According to one of those models, a large chunk of the subducted plate of a former ocean has survived in the uppermost mantle for several hundred million years, and its oceanic crust now causes excessive melt generation and the observed volcanism. This model, however, is not backed by dynamical calculations, nor is it exclusively required by the data, and it also leaves unanswered questions concerning the dynamical and chemical stability of such a body over that long period or the thermal effect of such massive melting.

==== Upper mantle convection ====
Another model proposes that the upwelling in the Iceland region is driven by lateral temperature gradients between the suboceanic mantle and the neighbouring Greenland craton and therefore also restricted to the upper 200–300 km (120–190 mi) of the mantle. This convection mechanism is probably not strong enough under the conditions prevailing in the north Atlantic, with respect to the spreading rate, and it does not offer a simple explanation for the observed geoid anomaly.

== Geophysical and geochemical observations ==
Information about the structure of Earth's deep interior can be acquired only indirectly by geophysical and geochemical methods. For the investigation of postulated plumes, gravimetric, geoid and in particular seismological methods along with geochemical analyses of erupted lavas have proven especially useful. Numerical models of the geodynamical processes attempt to merge these observations into a consistent general picture.

=== Seismology ===
An important method for imaging large-scale structures in Earth's interior is seismic tomography, by which the area under consideration is "illuminated" from all sides with seismic waves from earthquakes from as many different directions as possible; these waves are recorded with a network of seismometers. The size of the network is crucial for the extent of the region that can be imaged reliably. For the investigation of the Iceland Plume, both global and regional tomography have been used; in the former, the whole mantle is imaged at relatively low resolution using data from stations all over the world, whereas in the latter, a denser network only on Iceland images the mantle down to 400–450 km (250–280 mi) depth with higher resolution.

Regional studies from the 1990s and 2000s show that there is a low seismic-wave-speed anomaly beneath Iceland, but opinion is divided as to whether it continues deeper than the mantle transition zone at roughly 600 km (370 mi) depth. The velocities of seismic waves are reduced by up to 3% (P waves) and more than 4% (S waves), respectively. These values are consistent with a small percentage of partial melt, a high magnesium content of the mantle, or elevated temperature. It is not possible to unambiguously separate which effect causes the observed velocity reduction.

=== Geochemistry ===
Numerous studies have addressed the geochemical signature of the lavas present on Iceland and in the north Atlantic. The resulting picture is consistent in several important respects. For instance, it is not contested that the source of the volcanism in the mantle is chemically and petrologically heterogeneous: it contains not only peridotite, the principal mantle rock type, but also eclogite, a rock type that originates from the basalt in subducted slabs and is more easily fusible than peridotite. The origin of the latter is assumed to be metamorphosed, very old oceanic crust that sank into the mantle several hundreds of millions of years ago during the subduction of an ocean, then upwelled from deep within the mantle.

Studies using the major and trace-element compositions of Icelandic volcanics showed that the source of present-day volcanism was about 100 °C (212 °F) greater than that of the source of mid-ocean ridge basalts.

The variations in the concentrations of trace elements such as helium, lead, strontium, neodymium, and others show clearly that Iceland is compositionally distinct from the rest of the north Atlantic. An example of this is seen in the ratio of helium-3 (^{3}He) to helium-4 (^{4}He) isotopes. The ratio of helium-3 and helium-4 is a marker that indicates the origin of the mantle involved in eruptions. Helium-3 is captured during planetary accretion, thus is associated with relatively deeper or lower mantle. Helium-4 is created from the decay of uranium and thorium parent isotopes. A low ratio of ^{3}He to ^{4}He is strongly correlated with mid ocean ridge eruptions due to its shallow source of mantle, while high ratios of ^{3}He to ^{4}He are correlated with ocean island basalts due to its deeper source of mantle. Both high and low ratios of ^{3}He to ^{4}He are found on Iceland. High ratios are associated with the western portion of the island, while lower ratios are associated with the eastern part of the island. These ratio trends correlate well with geophysical anomalies, and the decrease of this and other geochemical signatures with increasing distance from Iceland. Combined, they indicate that the extent of the compositional anomaly reaches about 1,500 km (930 mi) along the Reykjanes Ridge and at least 300 km (190 mi) along the Kolbeinsey Ridge. Depending on which elements are considered and how large the area covered is, one can identify up to six different mantle components, which are not all present in any single location.

Furthermore, some studies show that the amount of water dissolved in mantle minerals is two to six times higher in the Iceland region than in undisturbed parts of the mid-oceanic ridges, where it is regarded to lie at about 150 parts per million. The presence of such a large amount of water in the source of the lavas would tend to lower its melting point and make it more productive for a given temperature. It would also produce the higher melt temperatures found, than typical of mid-ocean ridge basalts.

=== Gravimetry/Geoid ===
The north Atlantic is characterized by strong, large-scale anomalies of the gravity field and the geoid. The geoid rises up to 70 m (230 ft) above the geodetic reference ellipsoid in an approximately circular area with a diameter of several hundred kilometers. In the context of the plume hypothesis, this has been explained by the dynamic effect of the upwelling plume that bulges up the surface of the Earth. Furthermore, the plume and the thickened crust cause a positive gravity anomaly of about 60 mGal (=0.0006 m/s²) (free-air).

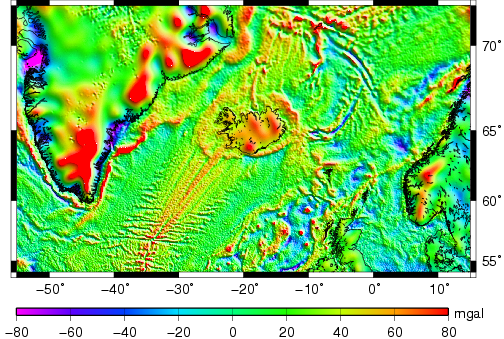
Free-air gravity anomalies in the north Atlantic around Iceland. For better representation the color scale was limited to anomalies up to +80 mGal (+0.8 mm/s²).

=== Geodynamics ===
Since the mid-1990s several attempts have been made to explain the observations with numerical geodynamical models of mantle convection. The purpose of these calculations was, among other things, to resolve the paradox that a broad plume with a relatively low temperature anomaly is in better agreement with the observed crustal thickness, topography, and gravity than a thin, hot plume, which has been invoked to explain the seismological and geochemical observations. The most recent models prefer a plume that is 180–200 °C (356–392 °F) hotter than the surrounding mantle and has a stem with a radius of about 100 km (62 mi). Such temperatures have not yet been confirmed by petrology, however.

=== Magma transportation under Iceland ===
Understanding how magma is transported from great depths near the Mohorovičić discontinuity to the surface has implications for understanding the mechanics of magma movement under Iceland. A study on the Borgarhraun basalt flow helped to constrain the velocity of magma transport from great depths to the surface. Geothermal barometry and statistical analysis of aluminium within olivine crystals allowed the researchers to determine the depth that these crystals were formed in and how long it took them to reach the surface. In this case, the magma was originally at a depth of 24 km (15 mi). The resulting velocity of the magma ascension was calculated to be 0.02-0.1 m/s so that magma takes a mean of 10 days to reach the surface of Iceland from the Moho discontinuity, which is faster than previously thought.

== See also ==
- Geology of Iceland
- Glacial lake outburst flood
- List of volcanoes in Iceland
- Volcanism of Iceland
- List of volcanic eruptions in Iceland
- Geological deformation of Iceland
- Global Volcanism Program
