= Alpha Ridge =

Major volcanic ridge under the Arctic Ocean

Coordinates: 84°N 97°W

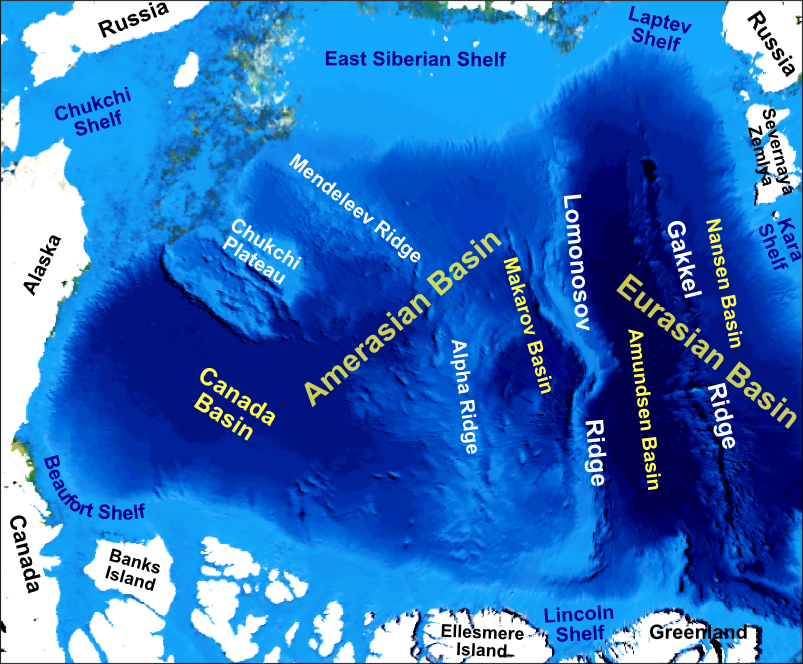
Main bathymetric/topographic features of the Arctic Ocean

The Alpha Ridge is a major volcanic ridge under the Arctic Ocean between the Canada Basin (off Ellesmere Island) and the Lomonosov Ridge. It was active during the formation of the Amerasian Basin. It was discovered in 1963. The highest elevation is about 2,700 m over the ocean floor. It is 200 to 450 km wide. The Alpha Ridge, Lomonosov Ridge, and Nansen-Gakkel Ridge are the three major ranges that divide the Arctic Ocean floor, running generally parallel to each other.

The 1983 Canadian Expedition to Study the Alpha Ridge (CESAR) seemed to establish that the Alpha Ridge is an extension of the continent from Ellesmere Island and hence there is a possibility that Canada may lay claim to the resource rights for the region, in particular for petroleum, according to the United Nations' Law of the Sea. There is no final conclusion to the issue so far, and part of the research planned for the European Drilling Research Icebreaker (Aurora Borealis) was drilling of the Alpha Ridge to collect more data.

Other research suggests that the ridge is probably a result of the oceanic mode of development.

The Strand Fiord Formation on northwestern and west-central Axel Heiberg Island is interpreted to represent the cratonward extension of the Alpha Ridge.

The Alpha Ridge is part of the High Arctic Large Igneous Province.

== See also ==
- Ellesmere Island Volcanics
- The Chukchi Cap
