= Discovery Seamounts =

Chain of seamounts in the Southern Atlantic Ocean

- Location within South Atlantic

Location
- Location: Southern Atlantic Ocean
- Coordinates: 42°S 0.2°E

The Discovery Seamounts are a chain of seamounts in the Southern Atlantic Ocean, including Discovery Seamount. The seamounts are 850 kilometres (530 mi) east of Gough Island and once formed islands. Various volcanic rocks as well as glacial dropstones and sediments have been dredged from the Discovery Seamounts.

The Discovery Seamounts appear to be a volcanic seamount chain produced by the Discovery hotspot, whose earliest eruptions occurred either in the ocean, Cretaceous kimberlite fields in southern Namibia or the Karoo-Ferrar large igneous province. The seamounts formed between 41 and 35 million years ago; presently the hotspot is thought to lie southwest of the seamounts, where there are geological anomalies in rocks from the Mid-Atlantic Ridge that may reflect the presence of a neighbouring hotspot.

== Name and discovery ==
Discovery Seamount was discovered in 1936 by the research ship RRS Discovery II. It was named Discovery Bank by the crew of a German research ship, RV Schwabenland. Another name, Discovery Tablemount, was coined in 1963. In 1993 the name "Discovery Bank" was transferred by the General Bathymetric Chart of the Oceans to another seamount at Kerguelen, leaving the name "Discovery Seamounts" for the seamount group.

== Geography and geomorphology ==
The Discovery Seamounts are a group of 12 seamounts 850 kilometres (530 mi) east of Gough Island and southwest from Cape Town. The seamounts are more than 4 kilometres (2.5 mi) high and reach a minimum depth of 426 metres (1,398 ft) or 389 metres (1,276 ft), typically 394–400 metres (1,293–1,312 ft) or 400–500 metres (1,300–1,600 ft). They are guyots, former islands that were eroded to a flat plateau and submerged through thermal subsidence of the lithosphere. These seamounts are also referred to as the Discovery Rise and subdivided into a northwestern and a southeastern trend. The group extends over an east-west region of more than 611 kilometres (380 mi) length.

The largest of these seamounts is named Discovery Seamount. It is covered with ice-rafted debris and fossil-containing sediments, which have been used to infer paleoclimate conditions in the region during the Pleistocene. Other evidence has been used to postulate that the seamount subsided by about 0.5 kilometres (0.31 mi) during the late Pleistocene. Other named seamounts are Shannon Seamount southeast and Heardman Seamount due south from Discovery. The seafloor is covered by ponded sediments, sand waves, rocks, rubble and biogenic deposits; sediment covers most of the ground.

The crust underneath Discovery Seamount is about 67 million years (late Cretaceous) old. A fracture zone (a site of crustal weakness) is located nearby.

== Geology ==
The Southern Atlantic Ocean contains a number of volcanic systems such as the Discovery Seamounts, the Rio Grande Rise, the Shona Ridge and the Walvis Ridge. Their existence is commonly attributed to hotspots, although this interpretation has been challenged. The hotspot origin of Discovery and the Walvis–Tristan da Cunha seamount chains was proposed first in 1972. In the case of the Shona Ridge and the Discovery Seamounts, the theory postulates that they formed as the African Plate moved over the Shona hotspot and the Discovery hotspot, respectively.

The Discovery hotspot, if it exists, would be located southwest of the Discovery Seamounts, off the Mid-Atlantic Ridge. The seamounts wane out in that direction, but the Little Ridge close to the Mid-Atlantic Ridge may be their continuation after the hotspot crossed the Agulhas Fracture Zone. The Discovery Ridge close to the Mid-Atlantic Ridge may come from the hotspot as well. Low seismic velocity anomalies have been detected in the mantle southwest of the Discovery Seamounts and may constitute the Discovery hotspot. Deeper in the mantle, the Discovery hotspot appears to connect with the Shona and Tristan hotspots to a single plume, which in turn emanates from the African superplume and might form a "curtain" of hotspots at the edge of the superplume. Material from the Discovery hotspot reached as far as Patagonia in South America, where it appears in volcanoes.

Magma may flow from the Discovery hotspot to the Mid-Atlantic Ridge, feeding the production of excess crustal material at its intersection with the Agulhas-Falklands Fracture Zone, one of the largest transform faults of Earth. There is a region on the Mid-Atlantic Ridge southwest of the seamounts where there are fewer earthquakes than elsewhere along the ridge, the central valley of the ridge is absent, and where dredged rocks share geochemical traits with the Discovery Seamount. Petrological anomalies at spreading ridges have been often attributed to the presence of mantle plumes close to the ridge, and such has been proposed for the Discovery hotspot as well. Alternatively, the Discovery hotspot may have interacted with the ridge in the past, and the present-day mantle temperature and neodymium isotope anomalies next to the ridge could be left from this past interaction.

The Agulhas-Falkland fracture zone has an unusual structure on the African Plate, where it displays the Agulhas Ridge, two over 2-kilometre (1.2 mi) high ridge segments which are parallel to each other. This unusual structure may be due to magma from the Discovery hotspot, which would have been channelled to the Agulhas Ridge.

Whether there is a link between the Discovery hotspot and Gough Island or the Tristan hotspot is unclear. An alternative hypothesis is that the Discovery Seamounts formed when magma rose along a fracture zone or other crustal weakness.

=== Composition ===
Rocks dredged from the seamounts include lavas, pillow lavas and volcaniclastic rocks. Geochemically they are classified as alkali basalt, basalt, phonolite, tephriphonolite, trachyandesite, trachybasalt and trachyte. Minerals contained in the rocks include alkali feldspar, apatite, biotite, clinopyroxene, iron and titanium oxides, olivine, plagioclase, sphene and spinel. Other rocks are continental crust rocks, probably glacial dropstones, and manganese.

The Discovery hotspot appears to have erupted two separate sets of magmas with distinct compositions in a north-south pattern, similar to the Tristan da Cunha-Gough Island hotspot. The composition of the Discovery Seamounts rocks has been compared to Gough Island. The more felsic rocks at Discovery appear to have formed in magma chambers, similar to felsic rocks at other Atlantic Ocean islands.

== Biology ==
Seamounts tend to concentrate food sources from seawater and thus draw numerous animal species. In the Discovery Seamounts they include bamboo corals, brachiopods, cephalopods, cirripedes, sea fans, sea urchins and sea whips. There are c. 150 fish species at Discovery Seamount, including the pygmy flounder; the deep-sea hatchetfish Maurolicus inventionis and the codling Guttigadus nudirostre are endemic to Discovery Seamount. Fossil corals have been recovered in dredges, while no stone coral colonies were reported during a 2019 investigation.

Both Japanese and Soviet fishers trawled the seamounts during the 1970s and 1980s, but there was no commercial exploitation of the resources. Observations in 2019 detected changes in the Discovery Seamount ecosystems that may be due to fishing or sea urchin outbreaks.

== Eruption history ==
A number of dates ranging from 41 to 35 million years ago have been obtained on dredged samples from the seamounts on the basis of argon-argon dating. The age of the seamounts decreases in southwest direction, similar to the Walvis Ridge, and at a similar rate. It is possible that Discovery Seamount split into a northern and southern part about 20 million years ago. Activity there may have continued until 7-6.5 million years ago.

Unlike the Walvis Ridge, which is connected to the Etendeka flood basalts, the Discovery Seamounts do not link with onshore volcanic features. However, it has been proposed that the 70- to 80-million-year-old Blue Hills, Gibeon and Gross Brukkaros kimberlite fields in southern Namibia may have been formed by the Discovery hotspot, and some plate reconstructions place it underneath the Karoo-Ferrar large igneous province at the time at which it was emplaced. Kimberlites in South Africa and Greater Cederberg-False Bay large igneous province has been associated with the Discovery hotspot. The latter large igneous province may have formed at a triple junction around the nascent South Atlantic Ocean, and, together with hotspots farther north, precipitated the rifting of the South Atlantic. Between 60 and 40 million years ago the hotspot was located close to the spreading ridge of the South Atlantic.
