= Hotspot (geology) =

Volcanic region hotter than the surrounding mantle

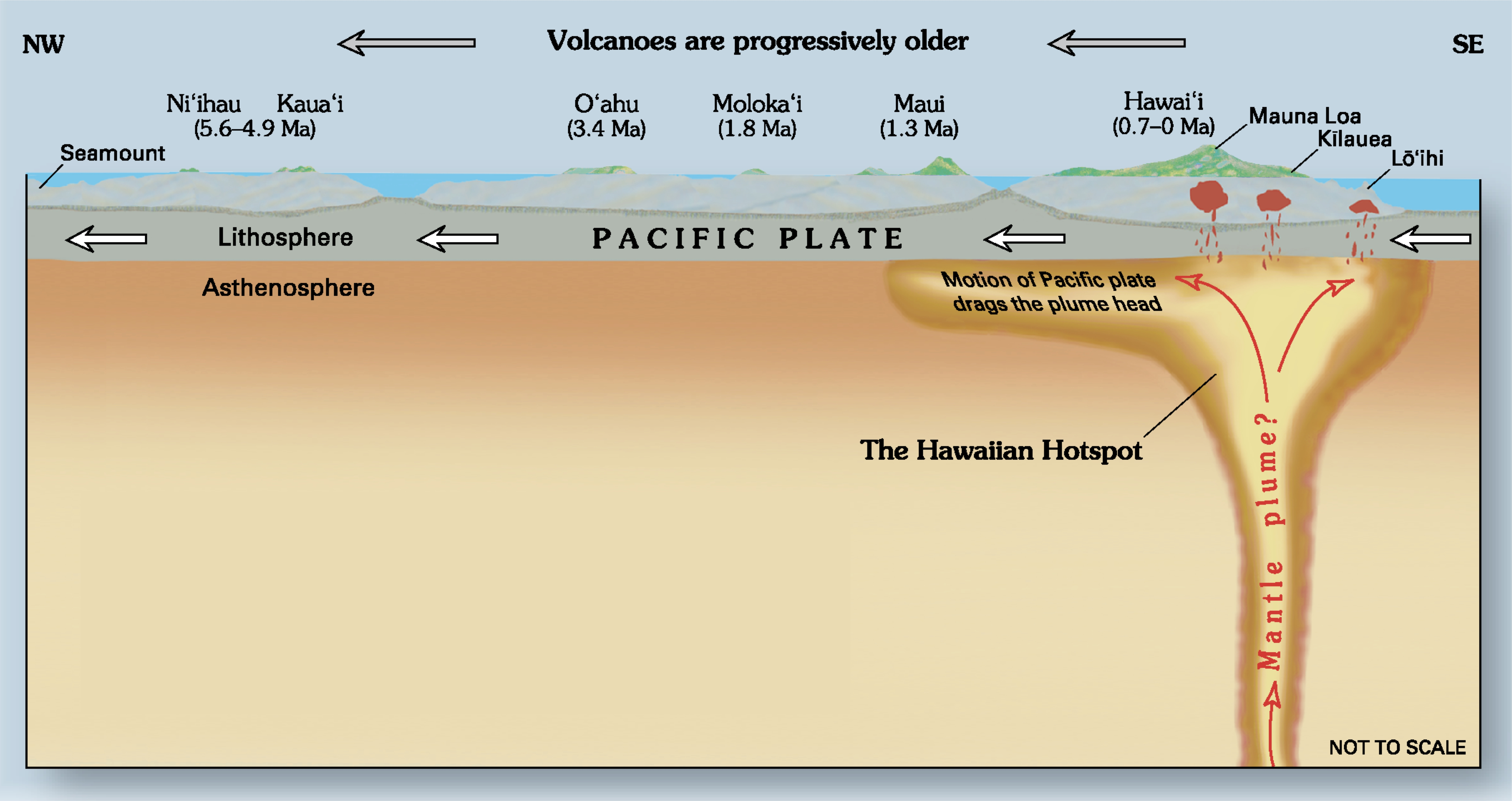
Diagram showing a cross section through Earth at the Hawaii hotspot. Magma originating in the mantle rises into the asthenosphere and lithosphere. A chain of volcanoes is created as the lithosphere moves over the source of magma. ("Ma" means millions of years old/ago).

In geology, hotspots (or hot spots) are volcanic locales thought to be fed by underlying mantle that is anomalously hot compared with the surrounding mantle. Examples include the Hawaii, Iceland, and Yellowstone hotspots. A hotspot's position on the Earth's surface is independent of tectonic plate boundaries, and so hotspots may create a chain of volcanoes as the plates move above them.

There are two hypotheses that attempt to explain their origins. One suggests that hotspots are due to mantle plumes that rise as thermal diapirs from the core–mantle boundary. The alternative plate theory is that the mantle source beneath a hotspot is not anomalously hot, rather the crust above is unusually weak or thin, so that lithospheric extension permits the passive rising of melt from shallow depths.

== Origin ==
Schematic diagram showing the physical processes inside the Earth that lead to the generation of magma. Partial melting begins above the fusion point.

Map showing approximate location of many current hotspots and the relationship to current tectonic plates and their boundaries and movement vectors

The origins of the concept of hotspots lie in the work of J. Tuzo Wilson, who postulated in 1963 that the formation of the Hawaiian Islands resulted from the slow movement of a tectonic plate across a hot region beneath the surface. It was later postulated that hotspots are fed by streams of hot mantle rising from the Earth's core–mantle boundary in a structure called a mantle plume. Whether or not such mantle plumes exist has been the subject of a major controversy in Earth science, but seismic images consistent with evolving theory now exist.

At any place where volcanism is not linked to a constructive or destructive plate margin, the concept of a hotspot has been used to explain its origin. A review article by Courtillot et al. listing possible hotspots makes a distinction between primary hotspots coming from deep within the mantle and secondary hotspots derived from mantle plumes. The primary hotspots originate from the core/mantle boundary and create large volcanic provinces with linear tracks (Easter Island, Iceland, Hawaii, Afar, Louisville, Reunion, and Tristan confirmed; Galapagos, Kerguelen and Marquersas likely). The secondary hotspots originate at the upper/lower mantle boundary, and do not form large volcanic provinces, but island chains (Samoa, Tahiti, Cook, Pitcairn, Caroline, MacDonald confirmed, with up to 20 or so more possible). Other potential hotspots are the result of shallow mantle material surfacing in areas of lithospheric break-up caused by tension and are thus a very different type of volcanism.

Estimates for the number of hotspots postulated to be fed by mantle plumes have ranged from about 20 to several thousand, with most geologists considering a few dozen to exist. Hawaii, Réunion, Yellowstone, Galápagos, and Iceland are some of the most active volcanic regions to which the hypothesis is applied. The plumes imaged to date vary widely in width and other characteristics, and are tilted, being not the simple, relatively narrow and purely thermal plumes many expected. Only one, Yellowstone, has as yet been consistently modelled and imaged from deep mantle to surface.

== Composition ==
Most hotspot volcanoes are basaltic (e.g., Hawaii, Tahiti). As a result, they are less explosive than subduction zone volcanoes, in which water is trapped under the overriding plate. Where hotspots occur in continental regions, basaltic magma rises through the continental crust, which melts to form rhyolites which can form violent eruptions. For example, the Yellowstone Caldera was formed by some of the most powerful volcanic explosions in geologic history. However, when the rhyolite is completely ejected, it may be followed by eruptions of basaltic magma rising through the same lithospheric fissures (cracks in the lithosphere). An example of this activity is the Ilgachuz Range in British Columbia, which was created by an early complex series of trachyte and rhyolite eruptions, and late extrusion of a sequence of basaltic lava flows.

The hotspot hypothesis is now closely linked to the mantle plume hypothesis. The detailed compositional studies now possible on hotspot basalts have allowed linkage of samples over the wider areas often implicate in the later hypothesis, and its seismic imaging developments.

== Contrast with subduction zone island arcs ==
Hotspot volcanoes are considered to have a fundamentally different origin from island arc volcanoes. The latter form over subduction zones, at converging plate boundaries. When one oceanic plate meets another, the denser plate is forced downward into a deep ocean trench. This plate, as it is subducted, releases water into the base of the over-riding plate, and this water mixes with the rock, thus changing its composition causing some rock to melt and rise. It is this that fuels a chain of volcanoes, such as the Aleutian Islands, near Alaska.

== Hotspot volcanic chains ==
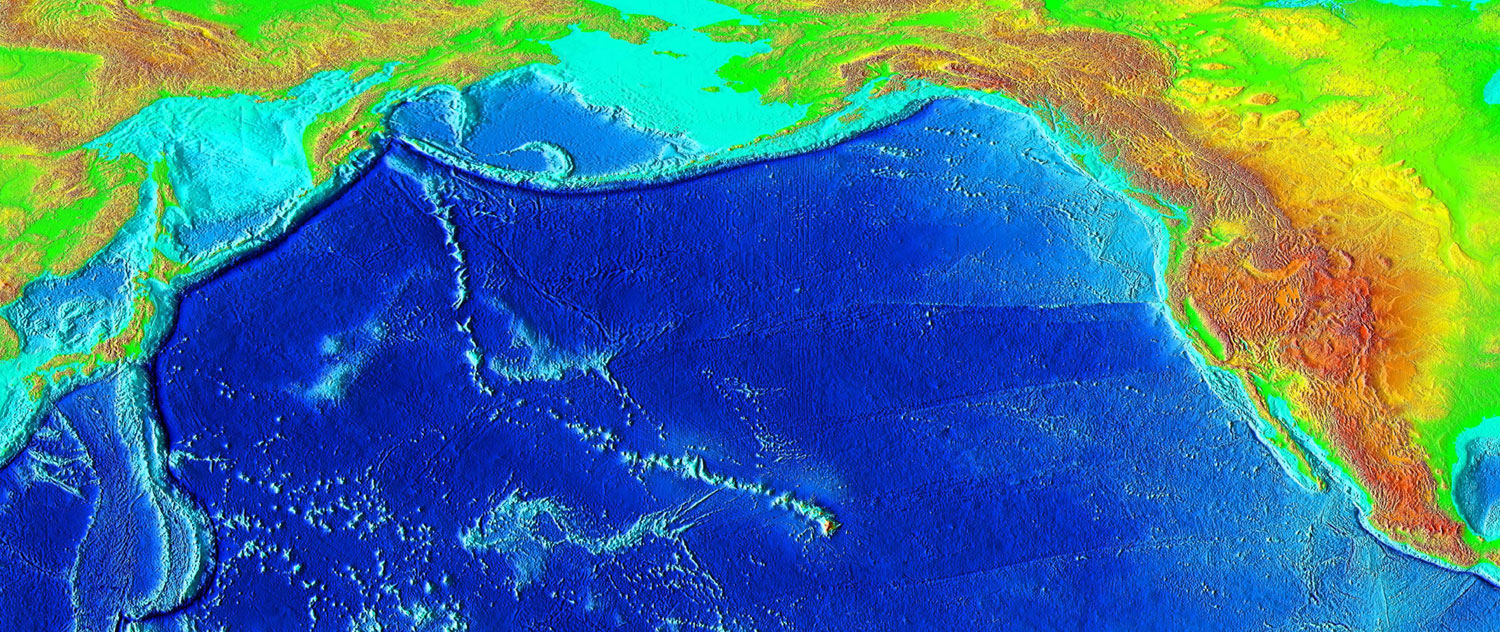
Over millions of years, the Pacific plate has moved over the Hawaii hotspot, creating a trail of underwater mountains that stretches across the Pacific.

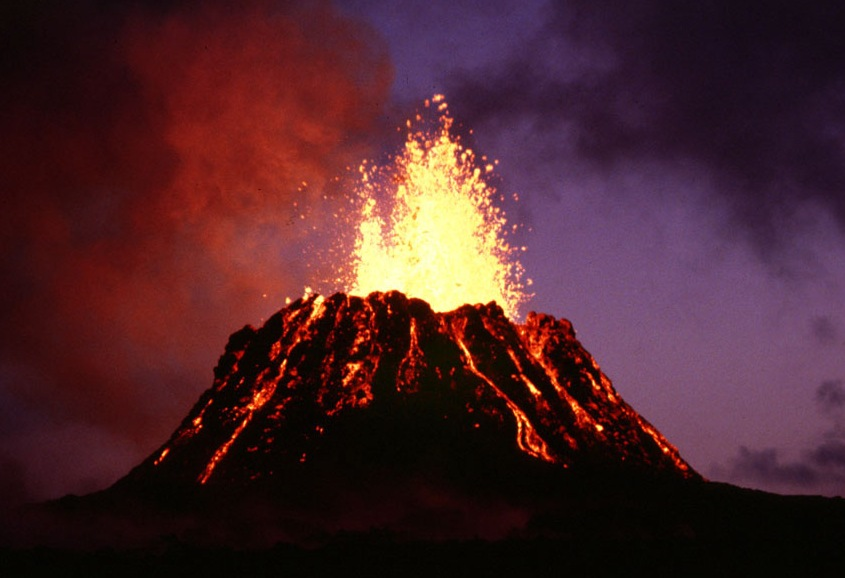
Kilauea is the most active shield volcano in the world. The volcano erupted from 1983 to 2018 and is part of the Hawaiian–Emperor seamount chain.

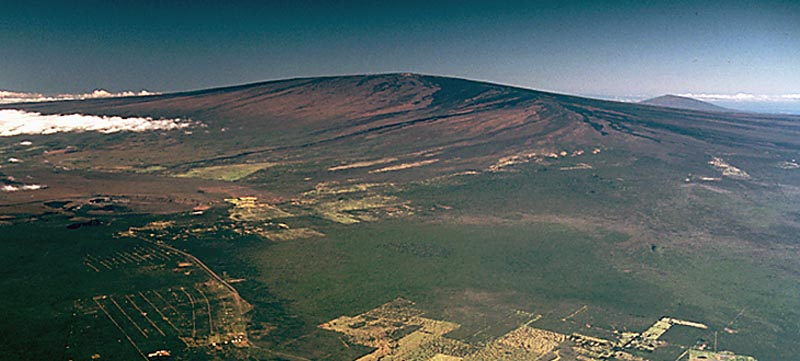
Mauna Loa is a large shield volcano. Its last eruption was in 2022 and it is part of the Hawaiian–Emperor seamount chain.

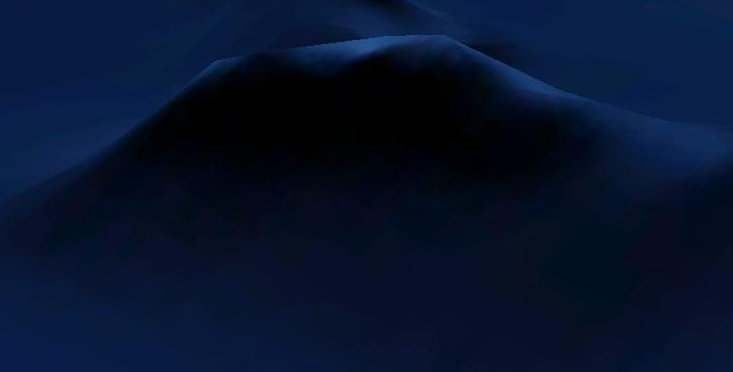
Bowie Seamount is a dormant submarine volcano and part of the Kodiak-Bowie Seamount chain.

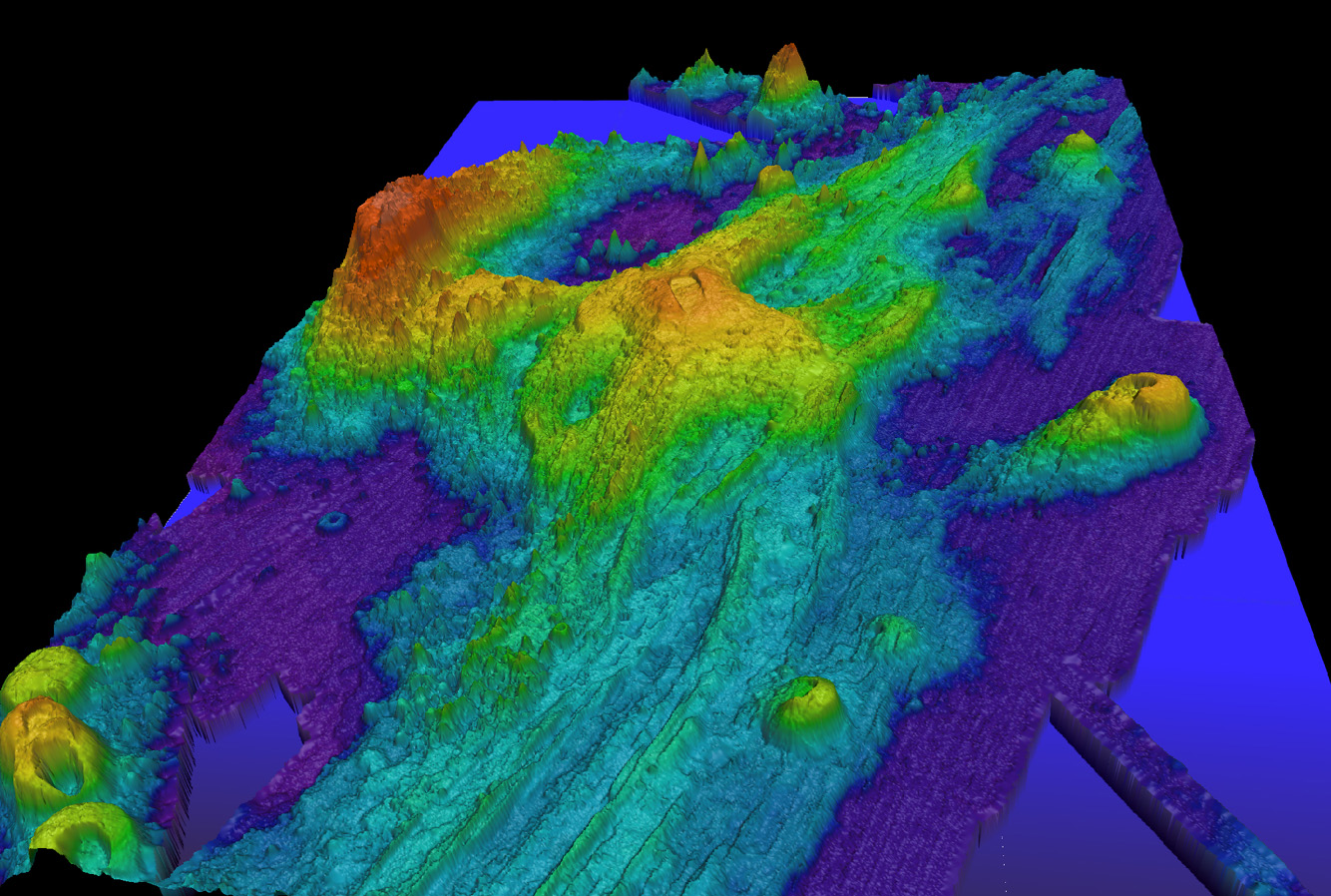
Axial Seamount is the youngest seamount of the Cobb–Eickelberg Seamount chain. Its last eruption was in 2015.

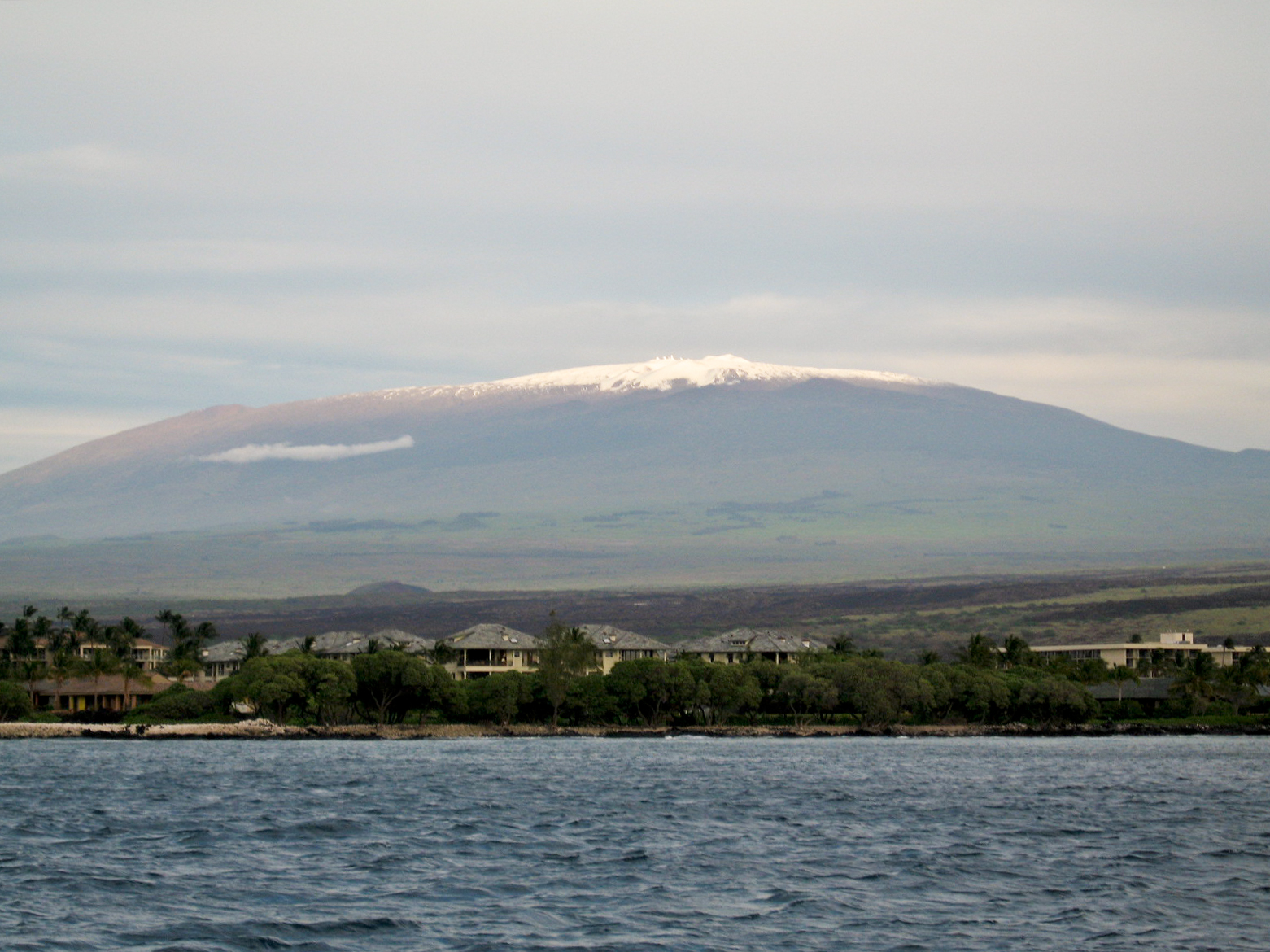
Mauna Kea is the tallest volcano in the Hawaiian–Emperor seamount chain. Many cinder cones have been emplaced around its summit.

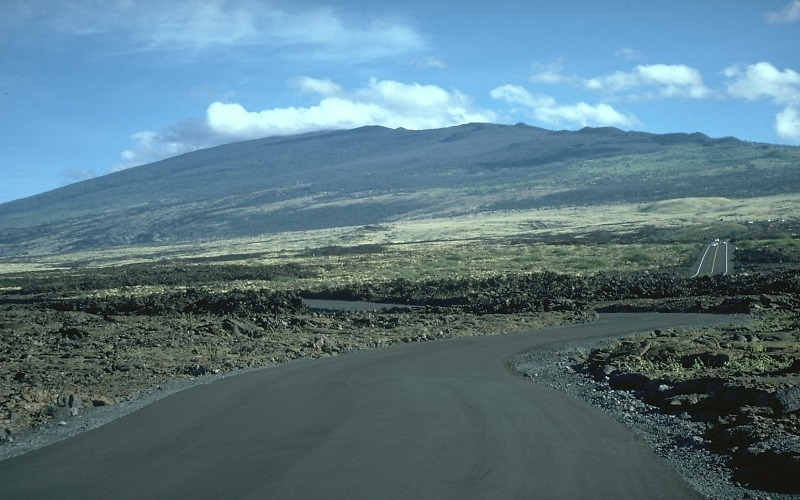
Hualalai is a massive shield volcano in the Hawaiian–Emperor seamount chain. Its last eruption was in 1801.

The joint mantle plume/hotspot hypothesis originally envisaged the feeder structures to be fixed relative to one another, with the continents and seafloor drifting overhead. The hypothesis thus predicts that time-progressive chains of volcanoes are developed on the surface. Examples include Yellowstone, which lies at the end of a chain of extinct calderas, which become progressively older to the west. Another example is the Hawaiian archipelago, where islands become progressively older and more deeply eroded to the northwest.

Geologists have tried to use hotspot volcanic chains to track the movement of the Earth's tectonic plates. This effort has been vexed by the lack of very long chains, by the fact that many are not time-progressive (e.g. the Galápagos) and by the fact that hotspots do not appear to be fixed relative to one another (e.g. Hawaii and Iceland). That mantle plumes are much more complex than originally hypothesised and move independently of each other and plates is now used to explain such observations.

In 2020, Wei et al. used seismic tomography to detect the oceanic plateau, formed about 100 million years ago by the hypothesized mantle plume head of the Hawaii-Emperor seamount chain, now subducted to a depth of 800 km under eastern Siberia.

=== Postulated hotspot volcano chains ===
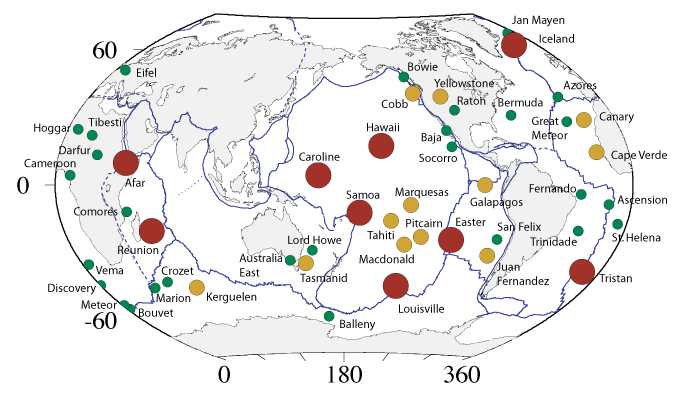
An example of mantle plume locations suggested by one recent group. Figure from Foulger (2010).

- Hawaiian–Emperor seamount chain (Hawaii hotspot)
- Louisville Ridge (Louisville hotspot)
- Walvis Ridge (Gough and Tristan hotspot)
- Kodiak–Bowie Seamount chain (Bowie hotspot)
- Cobb–Eickelberg Seamount chain (Cobb hotspot)
- New England Seamounts (New England hotspot)
- Anahim Volcanic Belt (Anahim hotspot)
- Mackenzie dike swarm (Mackenzie hotspot)
- Great Meteor hotspot track (New England hotspot)
- St. Helena Seamount Chain–Cameroon Volcanic Line (Saint Helena hotspot)
- Southern Mascarene Plateau–Chagos-Maldives-Laccadive Ridge (Réunion hotspot)
- Ninety East Ridge (Kerguelen hotspot)
- Tuamotu–Line Island chain (Easter hotspot)
- Austral–Gilbert–Marshall chain (Macdonald hotspot)
- Juan Fernández Ridge (Juan Fernández hotspot)
- Tasmantid Seamount Chain (Tasmantid hotspot)
- Canary Islands (Canary hotspot)
- Cape Verde (Cape Verde hotspot)

=== List of volcanic regions postulated to be hotspots ===
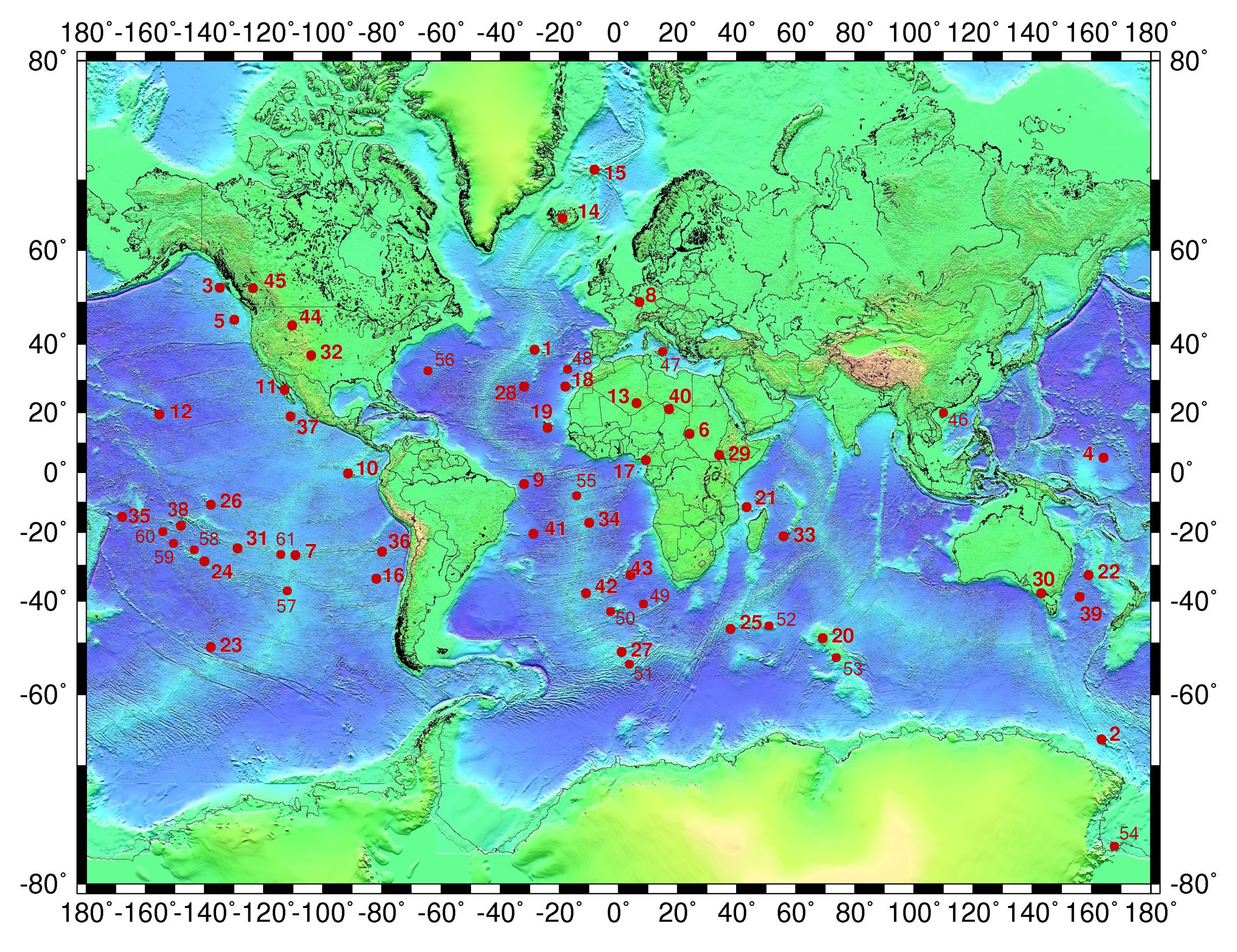
Distribution of hotspots in the list to the left, with the numbers corresponding to those in the list. The Afar hotspot (29) is misplaced.

In the following list of hotspots, "az" is the azimuth of the hotspot track; "w" is the "weight", or estimated accuracy, of the azimuth (1 is most accurate, 0.2 is least accurate).

==== Eurasian plate ====
- Eifel hotspot (8)
  - 50°12′N 6°42′E, w= 1 az= 082° ±8° rate= 12 ±2 mm/yr
- Iceland hotspot (14)
  - 64°24′N 17°18′W
    - Eurasian Plate, w= 0.8 az= 075° ±10° rate= 5 ±3 mm/yr
    - North American Plate, w= 0.8 az= 287° ±10° rate= 15 ±5 mm/yr
  - Possibly related to the North Atlantic continental rifting (62 Ma), Greenland.
- Azores hotspot (1)
  - 37°54′N 26°00′W
    - Eurasian Plate, w= 0.5 az= 110° ±12°
    - North American Plate, w= 0.3 az= 280° ±15°
- Jan Mayen hotspot (15)
  - 71°00′N 9°00′W
- Hainan hotspot (46)
  - 20°00′N 110°00′E, az= 000° ±15°

==== African plate ====
- Mount Etna (47)
  - 37°45′N 15°00′E
- Hoggar hotspot (13)
  - 23°18′N 5°36′E, w= 0.3 az= 046° ±12°
- Tibesti hotspot (40)
  - 20°48′N 17°30′E, w= 0.2 az= 030° ±15°
- Jebel Marra/Darfur hotspot (6)
  - 13°00′N 24°12′E, w= 0.5 az= 045° ±8°
- Afar hotspot (29, misplaced in map)
  - 7°00′N 39°30′E, w= 0.2 az= 030° ±15° rate= 16 ±8 mm/yr
  - Possibly related to the Afar triple junction, 30 Ma.
- Cameroon hotspot (17)
  - 2°00′N 5°06′E, w= 0.3 az= 032° ±3° rate= 15 ±5 mm/yr
- Madeira hotspot (48)
  - 32°36′N 17°18′W, w= 0.3 az= 055° ±15° rate= 8 ±3 mm/yr
- Canary hotspot (18)
  - 28°12′N 18°00′W, w= 1 az= 094° ±8° rate= 20 ±4 mm/yr
- New England/Great Meteor hotspot (28)
  - 29°24′N 29°12′W, w= 0.8 az= 040° ±10°
- Cape Verde hotspot (19)
  - 16°00′N 24°00′W, w= 0.2 az= 060° ±30°
- Sierra Leone hotspot
- St. Helena hotspot (34)
  - 16°30′S 9°30′W, w= 1 az= 078° ±5° rate= 20 ±3 mm/yr
- Gough hotspot (49), at 40°19' S 9°56' W.
  - 40°18′S 10°00′W, w= 0.8 az= 079° ±5° rate= 18 ±3 mm/yr
- Tristan hotspot (42), at 37°07′ S 12°17′ W.
  - 37°12′S 12°18′W
- Vema hotspot (Vema Seamount, 43), at 31°38' S 8°20' E.
  - 32°06′S 6°18′W
  - Related maybe to the Paraná and Etendeka traps (c. 132 Ma) through the Walvis Ridge.
- Discovery hotspot (50) (Discovery Seamounts)
  - 43°00′S 2°42′W, w= 1 az= 068° ±3°
- Bouvet hotspot (51)
  - 54°24′S 3°24′E
- Shona/Meteor hotspot (27)
  - 51°24′S 1°00′W, w= 0.3 az= 074° ±6°
- Réunion hotspot (33)
  - 21°12′S 55°42′E, w= 0.8 az= 047° ±10° rate= 40 ±10 mm/yr
  - Possibly related to the Deccan Traps (main events: 68.5–66 Ma)
- Comoros hotspot (21)
  - 11°30′S 43°18′E, w= 0.5 az=118 ±10° rate=35 ±10 mm/yr

==== Antarctic plate ====
- Marion hotspot (25)
  - 46°54′S 37°36′E, w= 0.5 az= 080° ±12°
- Crozet hotspot (52)
  - 46°06′S 50°12′E, w= 0.8 az= 109° ±10° rate= 25 ±13 mm/yr
  - Possibly related to the Karoo-Ferrar geologic province (183 Ma)
- Kerguelen hotspot (20)
  - 49°36′S 69°00′E, w= 0.2 az= 050° ±30° rate= 3 ±1 mm/yr
  - Related to the Kerguelen Plateau (130 Ma)
    - Heard hotspot (53), possibly part of Kerguelen hotspot
    - 53°06′S 73°30′E, w= 0.2 az= 030° ±20°
  - Île Saint-Paul and Île Amsterdam could be part of the Kerguelen hotspot trail (St. Paul is possibly not another hotspot)
- Balleny hotspot (2)
  - 67°36′S 164°48′E, w= 0.2 az= 325° ±7°
- Erebus hotspot (54)
  - 77°30′S 167°12′E

==== South American plate ====
- Trindade/Martin Vaz hotspot (41)
  - 20°30′S 28°48′W, w= 1 az= 264° ±5°
- Fernando hotspot (9)
  - 3°48′S 32°24′W, w= 1 az= 266° ±7°
  - Possibly related to the Central Atlantic Magmatic Province (c. 200 Ma)
- Ascension hotspot (55)
  - 7°54′S 14°18′W

==== North American plate ====
- Bermuda hotspot (56)
  - 32°36′N 64°18′W, w= 0.3 az= 260° ±15°
- Yellowstone hotspot (44)
  - 44°30′N 110°24′W, w= 0.8 az= 235° ±5° rate= 26 ±5 mm/yr
  - Possibly related to the Columbia River Basalt Group (17–14 Ma).
- Raton hotspot (32)
  - 36°48′N 104°06′W, w= 1 az= 240°±4° rate= 30 ±20 mm/yr
- Anahim hotspot (45)
  - 52°54′N 123°44′W (Nazko Cone)

==== Australian plate ====
- Lord Howe hotspot (22)
  - 34°42′S 159°48′E, w= 0.8 az= 351° ±10°
- Tasmantid hotspot (39)
  - 40°24′S 155°30′E, w= 0.8 az= 007° ±5° rate= 63 ±5 mm/yr
- East Australia hotspot (30)
  - 40°48′S 146°00′E, w= 0.3 az= 000° ±15° rate= 65 ±3 mm/yr

==== Nazca plate ====
- Juan Fernández hotspot (16)
  - 33°54′S 81°48′W, w= 1 az= 084° ±3° rate= 80 ±20 mm/yr
- San Felix hotspot (36)
  - 26°24′S 80°06′W, w= 0.3 az= 083° ±8°
- Easter hotspot (7)
  - 26°24′S 106°30′W, w= 1 az= 087° ±3° rate= 95 ±5 mm/yr
- Galápagos hotspot (10)
  - 0°24′S 91°36′W
    - Nazca Plate, w= 1 az= 096° ±5° rate= 55 ±8 mm/yr
    - Cocos Plate, w= 0.5 az= 045° ±6°
  - Possibly related to the Caribbean large igneous province (main events: 95–88 Ma).

==== Pacific plate ====
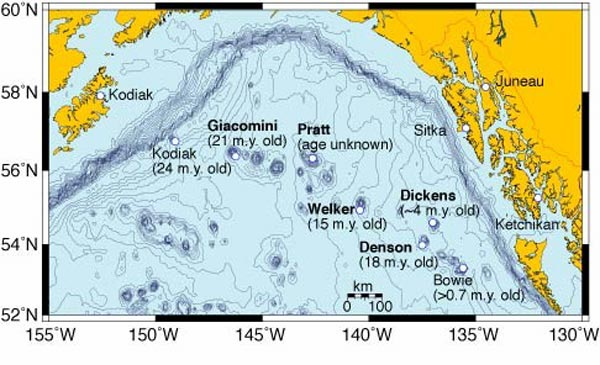
Over millions of years, the Pacific Plate has moved over the Bowie hotspot, creating the Kodiak–Bowie Seamount chain in the Gulf of Alaska.

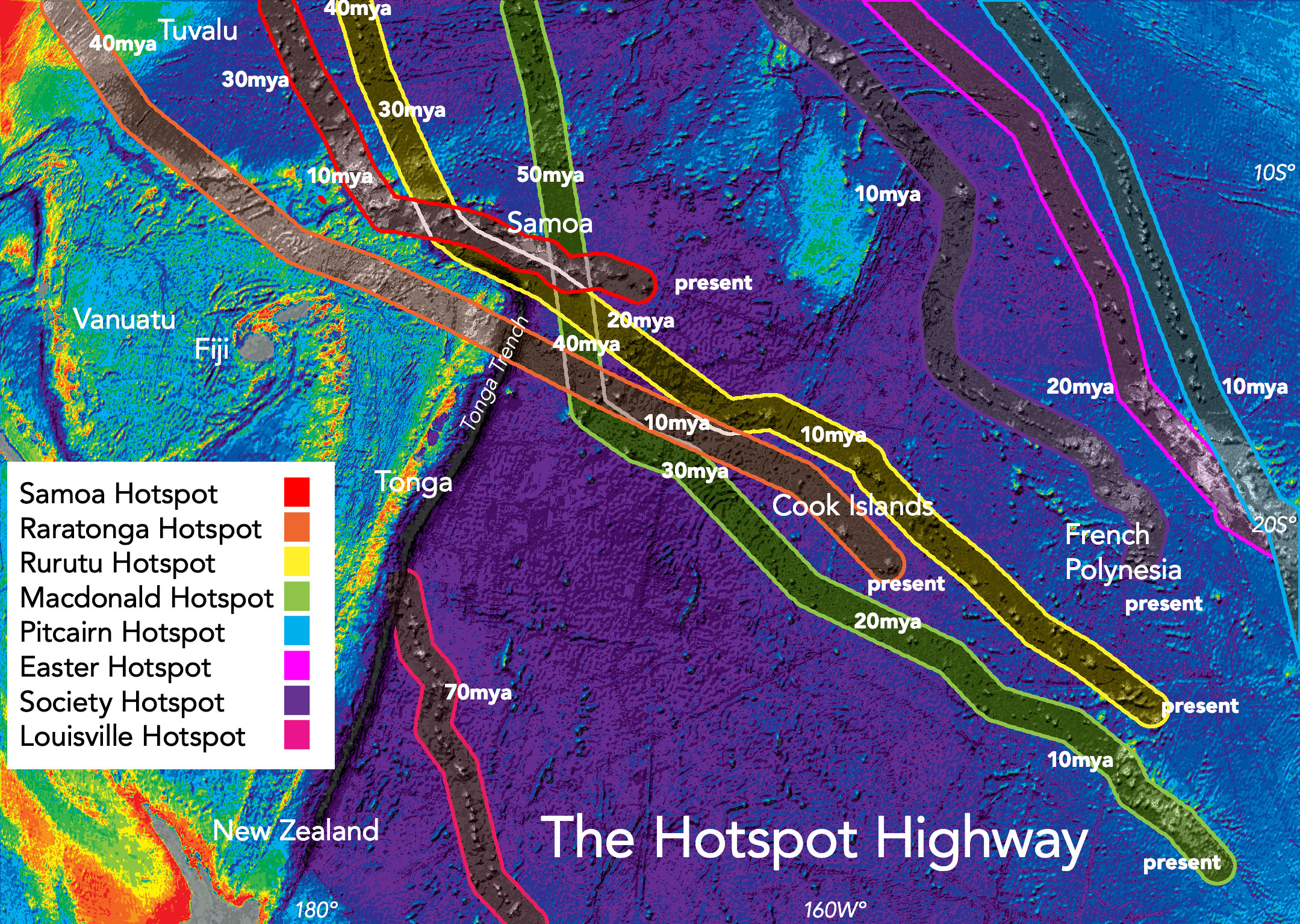
The Hotspot highway in the south Pacific Ocean

- Louisville hotspot (23)
  - 53°36′S 140°36′W, w= 1 az= 316° ±5° rate= 67 ±5 mm/yr
  - Possibly related to the Ontong Java Plateau (125–120 Ma).
- Foundation hotspot/Ngatemato seamounts (57)
  - 37°42′S 111°06′W, w= 1 az= 292° ±3° rate= 80 ±6 mm/yr
- Macdonald hotspot (24)
  - 29°00′S 140°18′W, w= 1 az= 289° ±6° rate= 105 ±10 mm/yr
- North Austral/President Thiers (President Thiers Bank, 58)
  - 25°36′S 143°18′W, w= (1.0) az= 293° ± 3° rate= 75 ±15 mm/yr
- Arago hotspot (Arago Seamount, 59)
  - 23°24′S 150°42′W, w= 1 az= 296° ±4° rate= 120 ±20 mm/yr
- Maria/Southern Cook hotspot (Îles Maria, 60)
  - 20°12′S 153°48′W, w= 0.8 az= 300° ±4°
- Samoa hotspot (35)
  - 14°30′S 168°12′W, w= 0.8 az= 285°±5° rate= 95 ±20 mm/yr
- Crough hotspot (Crough Seamount, 61)
  - 26°54′S 114°36′W, w= 0.8 az= 284° ± 2°
- Pitcairn hotspot (31)
  - 25°24′S 129°18′W, w= 1 az= 293° ±3° rate= 90 ±15 mm/yr
- Society/Tahiti hotspot (38)
  - 18°12′S 148°24′W, w= 0.8 az= 295°±5° rate= 109 ±10 mm/yr
- Marquesas hotspot (26)
  - 10°30′S 139°00′W, w= 0.5 az= 319° ±8° rate= 93 ±7 mm/yr
- Caroline hotspot (4)
  - 4°48′N 164°24′E, w= 1 az= 289° ±4° rate= 135 ±20 mm/yr
- Hawaii hotspot (12)
  - 19°00′N 155°12′W, w= 1 az= 304° ±3° rate= 92 ±3 mm/yr
- Socorro/Revillagigedos hotspot (37)
  - 19°00′N 111°00′W
- Guadalupe hotspot (11)
  - 27°42′N 114°30′W, w= 0.8 az= 292° ±5° rate= 80 ±10 mm/yr
- Cobb hotspot (5)
  - 46°00′N 130°06′W, w= 1 az= 321° ±5° rate= 43 ±3 mm/yr
- Bowie/Pratt-Welker hotspot (3)
  - 53°00′N 134°48′W, w= 0.8 az= 306° ±4° rate= 40 ±20 mm/yr

== Former hotspots ==
- Euterpe/Musicians hotspot (Musicians Seamounts)
- Mackenzie hotspot
- Matachewan hotspot

== See also ==
- Anorogenic magmatism
- Cold spot
- Tharsis
