= Noronha hotspot =

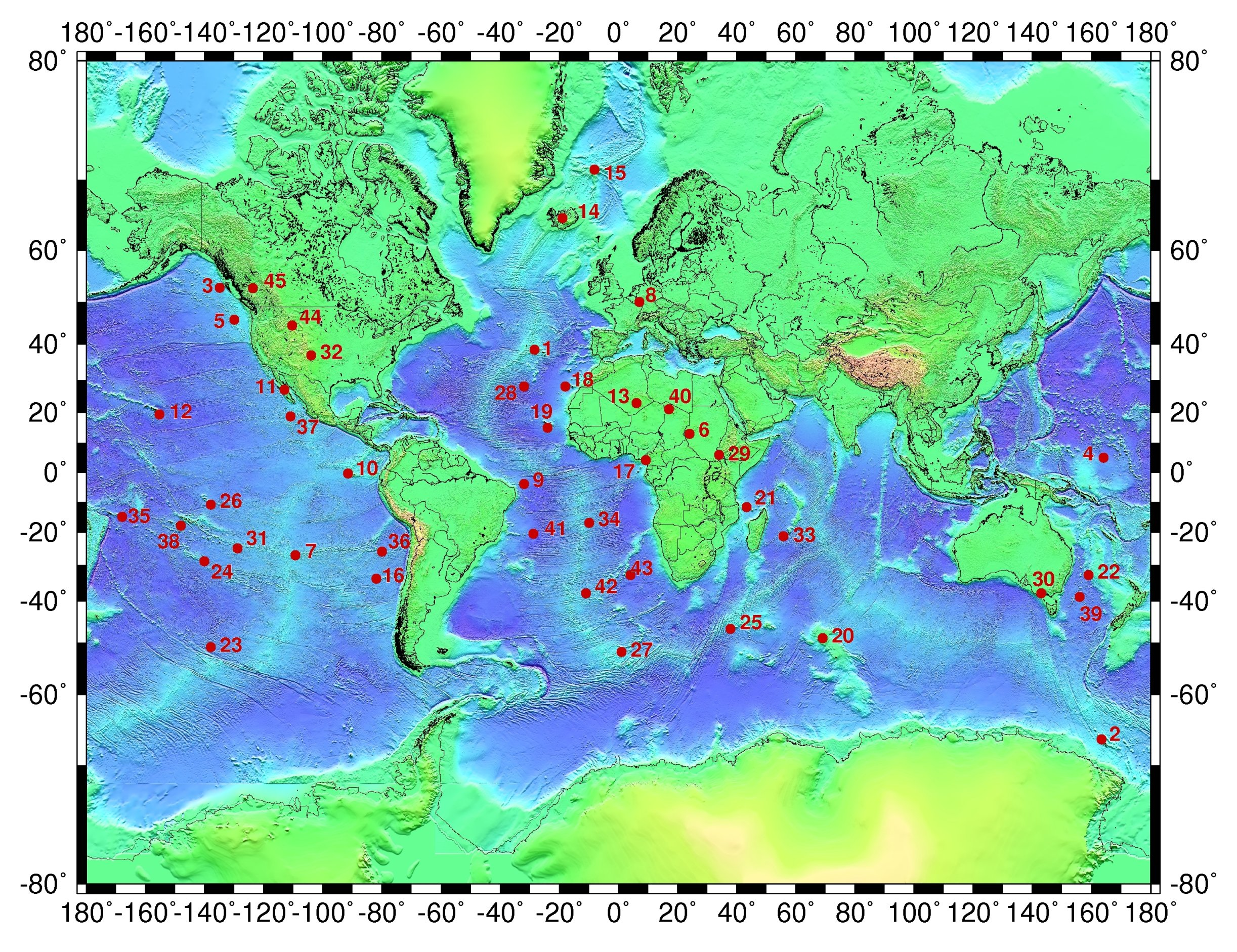
Global map of hotspots; Noronha is number #9

Noronha hotspot is a hypothesized hotspot in the Atlantic Ocean. It has been proposed as the candidate source for volcanism in the Fernando de Noronha archipelago of Brazil, as well as of other volcanoes also in Brazil and even the Bahamas and the Central Atlantic Magmatic Province.

The presence of a mantle plume is controversial owing to equivocal seismic tomography images of the mantle and the inconsistent age progression in the volcanoes, especially the Brazilian ones.

== General ==
The Noronha hotspot is also known as the Fernando hotspot. The hotspot is located over the South America Plate, which moves west-southwestward at a rate of 45 millimetres per year (1.8 in/year), and is considered to be part of a West African superplume. It may have been connected with the Parana hotspot and Kerguelen hotspot into a larger Karoo-Maud hotspot.

== Candidate volcanoes ==
=== Fernando de Noronha ===
The Noronha hotspot is considered to be currently located beneath the Fernando de Noronha islands, and age trends in the archipelago are consistent with a hotspot pattern. Such a hotspot would presently be centered beneath the eastern part of the archipelago. Mantle derived xenoliths found at Fernando de Noronha are consistent with the hotspot theory, although their traits can be explained with non-hotspot theories as well.

=== Rocas Atoll and Fernando de Noronha ridge ===
A series of volcanoes extend westwards away from Fernando de Noronha and may also be the consequence of hotspot volcanism. Volcanic structures in this ridge include guyots, islands and seamounts. The Rocas Atoll 137 kilometres (85 mi) from Fernando de Noronha has been proposed as another product of the Noronha hotspot.

=== Brazilian continental ===
Activity of the hotspot has been used to explain alkaline Cenozoic volcanism in Brazil, such as Pico Cabugi and the Fortaleza region. The hotspot 30 million years ago passed by northeastern Brazil, and some of the continental volcanics appear to have been erupted at the time of plume passage. This interaction may be responsible for the high geothermal gradient in the region as well. Oligocene-Eocene volcanic rocks in the offshore Potiguar basin may also be a product of a Noronha hotspot, while volcanics in the offshore Boa Vista and Cubati basins probably have a different origin. However, more recent chronological data have cast doubt on the plume origin of at least some of these volcanics.

The mantle plume that feeds the Noronha hotspot appears to combine several different types of magma judging by the isotope ratios of the erupted rocks. In addition, the plume material would have mixed with lithospheric melts to derive the rocks erupted by the continental volcanics. Distinct mantle domains have been inferred to have contributed to magma genesis for some volcanoes underneath Brazil than for Fernando de Noronha, which calls into question the origin of these volcanoes over a Noronha hotspot.

=== Caribbean and North America ===
If the Noronha hotspot is allowed to wander in the mantle, it is possible to reconstruct a path where it runs through Louisiana, Florida and the Bahamas between 180 and 150 million years ago. In that case the Bahamas may be a subsided volcanic ridge with corals atop of it. If the hotspot did not wander, it would have passed underneath Cuba and Hispaniola instead, with Cuba above the hotspot 160-140 million years ago.

Before 170 million years ago the hotspot was beneath Texas and Louisiana leaving no traces (maybe it was not active before then). If it followed a more southerly path, it may have been involved in the formation of the Gulf of Mexico.

Alternatively, if it passed farther east it may be identical with the "Newark plume" that is considered responsible for the Central Atlantic Magmatic Province; generally speaking the position of the North America Plate is fairly uncertain before 130 million years ago. The Cape Verde hotspot may also be related to the Central Atlantic Magmatic Province. The opening of the central Atlantic Ocean may be the consequence of the activity of either hotspot.

== Alternative theories ==
The Noronha hotspot does not have all the features one would expect from a hotspot. The geochronology of the Fernando de Noronha and mainland Brazil volcanics are not necessarily consistent with a mantle plume, much of the volcanic activity in both regions was contemporaneous for example. Further, seismic tomography has not imaged a mantle plume, although isolated seismic anomalies may reflect the existence of the hotspot. There are also geochemical problems but the composition of xenoliths in Noronha rocks is consistent with their derivation from a mantle plume. Several alternate theories have been proposed:

- The volcanism of Fernando de Noronha may be a product of oceanic fracture zones. One argument in support of this view is that the strike of the hotspot path is consistent with that of fracture zones but not with that of well defined hotspot tracks such as the Rio Grande Rise, which trends more southeasterly. The "Fernando de Noronha-Mecejana" volcano lineament has been attributed to such a transform fault. It is also possible that such a fracture zone and a hotspot simultaneously contributed to the development of the volcanics.
- A mantle plume beneath the Paraná may feed both the Fernando de Noronha, the Martin Vaz and some continental volcanic fields. Seismic tomography suggests that this mantle plume is actually the remnant of the plume associated with the Tristan hotspot.
- Edge-driven convection may be occurring at the margin of Brazil. This would be consistent with the volcanic activity not migrating over time, since edge-driven convection is tied to the continental block and "moves" along with it. However, an unrelated process must have enriched the mantle in the region in order to explain the composition of erupted volcanic rocks, which are inconsistent with melts derived from normal mantle. Seismic tomography shows structures that are consistent with such a theory.
