= Geology of Saint Helena =

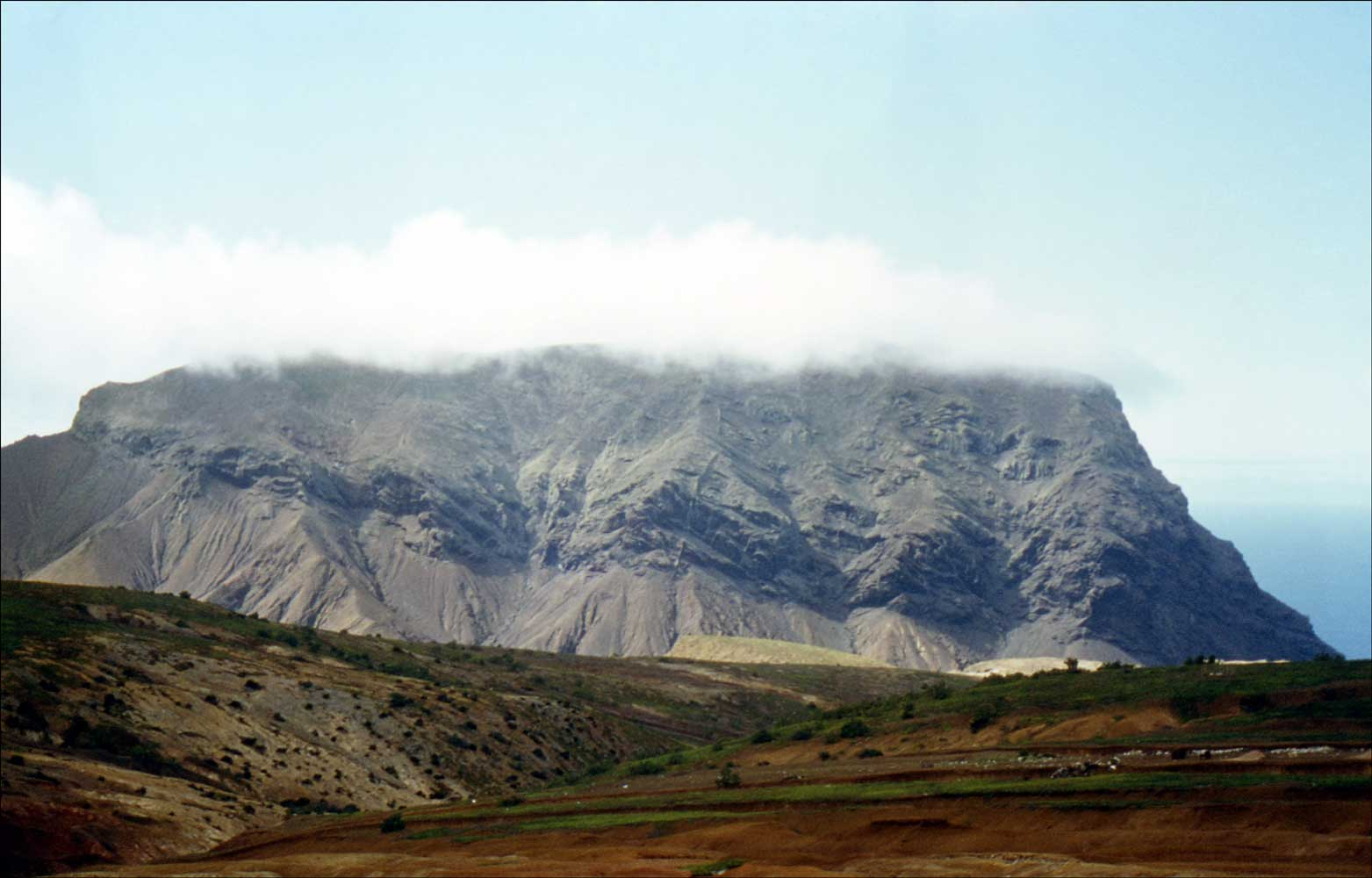
The Barn is a capping of younger lavas upon weaker rocks. The Barn features cliffs on the side that faces the sea. It overlooks the pyroclasts and weak flows of Turk's Cap Valley to the south.

The geology of Saint Helena resulted from the long-running volcanic activity of the Saint Helena hotspot. Most of the island was formed beginning 14 million years ago. Volcanism on the island ceased seven million years ago, leading to long-running erosion and the formation of deep, v-shaped valleys along with steep coastal cliffs. Some geochemists have observed significant trace element variations between South Atlantic islands and proposed that deep-ocean sediments may have mixed into the magma which formed Saint Helena.

== Rock units and geologic history ==
Saint Helena is comprised, almost universally of mafic basalts. The breccia and basalt lava flows of the Northeastern Volcanic Center formed due to undersea eruptions 14 to 11 million years ago, in the Miocene. These units were subsequently uplifted above the water surface. The Southwestern Volcanic Center covers more than half of the island and emplaced Lower Shield lava flows between 11 and 10 million years ago, followed by Main Shield flows between 11 and 9 million years ago. The Upper Shield formed between 8 and 9 million years ago. Some of the youngest igneous units on the island are trachyte intrusions from 7 to 8 million years ago. In some cases, more felsic trachyte actually formed flows, now preserved as Turk's Cap, Little Top and Great Stone Top. Trachyte masses are especially common on the southwest of the island.

The seismicity of Saint Helena is low. A few weak local earthquakes have occurred since its settlement, including an EMS-98 intensity V event in 1817. They are likely caused by crustal rebound from erosion, or volcanicity.

== Geochemistry ==
The isotopic composition of volcanic rocks in Saint Helena and nearby Ascension Island and Tristan da Cunha are very different from the Mid-Atlantic Ridge basalts. Many of the lavas on the island display a hawaiite geochemistry and share a characteristic niobium enrichment with basalts from Ascension and Bouvet Island. Some geochemists have proposed that small amounts of 1.5 to 2 billion year old pelagic sediments contaminated the magma source of the island, as a means of explaining the differing trace element ratios relative to Tristan da Cunha.
