= Sierra Leone (disambiguation) =

Sierra Leone is a country in western Africa.

Sierra Leone may also refer to:

== Places ==
- Sierra Leone Colony and Protectorate, the British colonial administration in Sierra Leone from 1808 to 1961
- Sierra Leone (1961–1971), a former sovereign state with Queen Elizabeth II as its head of state
- Sierra Leone hotspot, a proposed hotspot in the Atlantic Ocean
- Sierra Leone River, a river estuary on the Atlantic Ocean in western Sierra Leone

== Businesses and organisations ==
- Sierra Leone Airways, the former national airline of Sierra Leone
- Sierra Leone Brewery Limited, a Sierra Leonean brewing company
- Sierra Leone Broadcasting Corporation, the national radio and television broadcaster in Sierra Leone
- Sierra Leone Commercial Bank, a Sierra Leonean commercial bank
- Sierra Leone Company, the corporate body involved in founding Freetown, Sierra Leone

== Other uses ==
- Sierra Leone (horse), an American thoroughbred horse
- "Sierra Leone" (song), a 1983 single by New Zealand pop band Coconut Rough
- "Sierra Leone", a 2013 song by Big Sean from Hall of Fame
- "Sierra Leone", a 2011 song by Frank Ocean from Channel Orange
