= Ewing Seamount =

Seamount in the southern Atlantic in the Walvis Ridge

Coordinates: 23°14′40″S 8°16′20″E

The Ewing Seamount is a seamount in the southern Atlantic Ocean, which lies on the Tropic of Capricorn. Ewing is part of the Walvis Ridge having a mean depth of 4,500 metres and a summit depth of 700 metres.
