= Vitória-Trindade Ridge =

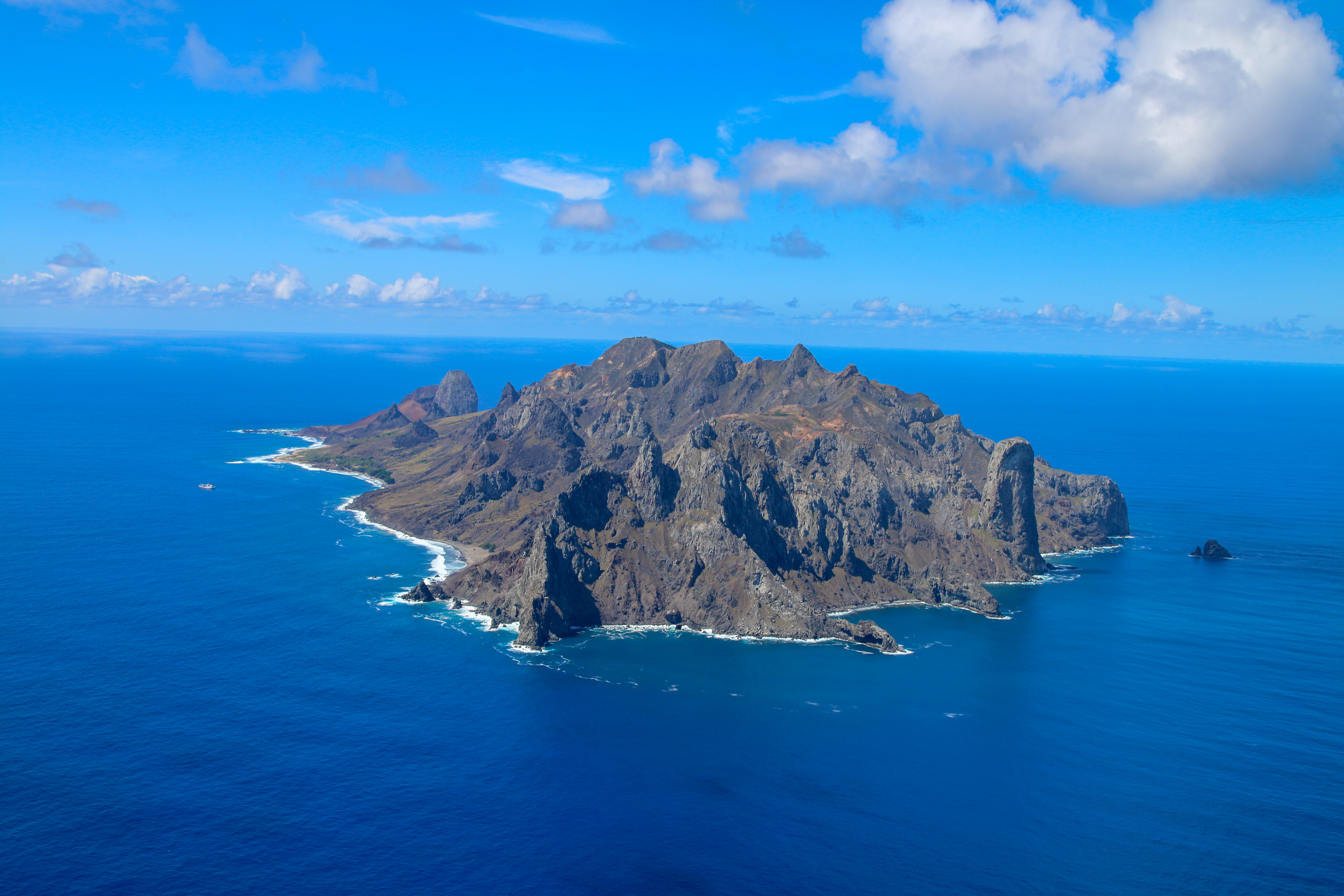
Martim Vaz island, part of the Trindade archipelago, is one of the few parts of the undersea ridge that is above sea level. It forms its eastern end.

The Vitória-Trindade Ridge is a 1200 km long ridge in the western part of the South Atlantic at around 20 degrees south latitude and which is composed of a series of seamounts and islands. It extends from 40 degrees west on the Brazil coast to 29 degrees west. It is composed of magmatic rocks and is scientifically considered to be the volcanic track of a mantle plume impinging on the South American tectonic plate which has thrown up a series of volcanic cones over the last 140 million years since the start of the Cretaceous period. The rocks are formed of an alkaline basalt.

The ridge forms a west–east-trending line of submerged mounts and banks that extends from the Brazilian eastern continental shelf around the state of Espirito Santo and stretches out into the deep-water portion of the southern Atlantic Ocean. The Trindade Archipelago, located 1200 km away from the coastline, forms its eastern terminus.

The ridge only breaks the surface of the South Atlantic to form the Trindade and Martim Vaz archipelago where relatively recent volcanism (Holocene) has thrown up substantial cones.

== Named high points along the ridge ==
The following are major high points along the ridge from west to east, all spread along the 20^{o} South latitude.

- Benard bank 40 W
- Vitoria sea mount 39 W
- Champlain sea mount
- Congress bank 38 W
- Montague sea mount 37 W
- Jaseur sea mount 36 W
- Davis bank 35 W
- Dogaressa bank 34 W
- Columbia sea mount 32 W
- Trindade Island 30 W
- Martim Vaz Island 29 W

== See also ==
- Rio Grande Rise – an unrelated aseismic ocean ridge in the southern Atlantic Ocean also off the coast of Brazil located to the south of the Vitória-Trindade ridge at about latitude 30 degrees south.
