= Tristan hotspot =

Volcanic hotspot in the Atlantic Ocean

Coordinates: 37°S 12°W

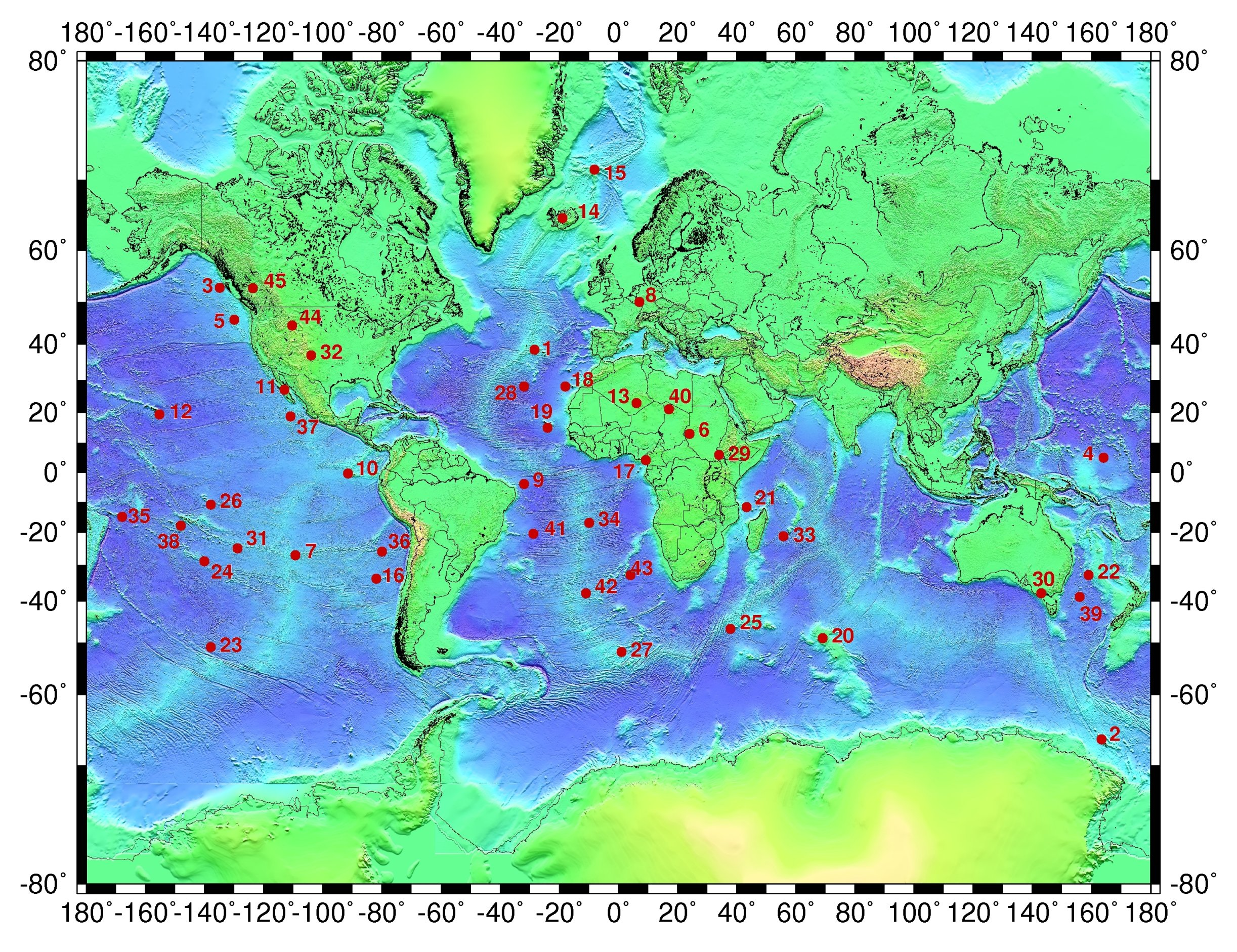
The Tristan hotspot is marked 42 on this map of hotspots.

The Tristan hotspot is the volcanic hotspot responsible for the activity that forms the volcanoes in the southern Atlantic Ocean. It is thought to have formed the island of Tristan da Cunha and the Walvis Ridge on the African Plate.

== Geology ==
The Tristan hotspot is believed to be closely connected with the Paraná and Etendeka flood basalt provinces, which formed over the hotspot during the opening of the South Atlantic Ocean.

The Tristan and Gough hotspots are widely spaced end-members of the volcanic system that generated the Walvis Ridge on the African plate and the Rio Grande Rise on the South American plate beginning at 129 to 133 Ma when the Paraná and Etendeka traps formed. Whether or not Tristan and Gough represent two distinct volcanic centers is still debated.

Fairhead & Wilson 2005 argued that the Walvis Ridge is not the product of a deep mantle plume or the Tristan hotspot, proposing instead that changes in the internal stress in the spreading African and South American plates trigger changes in the magmatic processes in the Mid-Atlantic Ridge. The Walvis Ridge should then have developed as a result of these periodic stress releases along the Mid-Atlantic Ridge.

O'Connor et al. 2012 found that the hotspot trails in the eastern South Atlantic (Tristan, Gough, Discovery, Shona, and possibly Bouvet) started forming synchronously 44 to 41 Ma. Older seamounts east of these hotspot trails formed at the edge of the African swell where the oceanic crust was spreading apart and are not the product of hotspot volcanism. The Tristan-Gough trail switched from forming a series of aseismic ridges to a broader line of guyots and smaller volcanic ridges at about the same time.

The hotspots of the eastern South Atlantic formed along the plume generation zones of the African large low seismic velocity province (LLSVP). LLSVPs are dense and stable structures, and most of the plumes, kimberlites, and large igneous provinces (LIPs) on Earth can be rotated back to the plume generation zones. All major African LIPs (Karoo, Paraná-Etendeka, and Agulhas) formed at the plume generation zones of the African LLSVP but 132 to 100 Ma the Tristan-Gough hotspot was the only hotspot located at a spreading boundary and therefore the only African hotspot that started to form a volcanic trail.

== Palaeoclimatic and evolutionary role ==
Based on molecular estimates, Arnason et al. 2000 found that the Homo–Pan divergence occurred 13 to 10.5 Ma (in contrast to earlier estimates that suggested around 5 Ma). Arnason et al. also estimated the Platyrrhini–Catarrhini divergence to have occurred around 70 Ma and found that the latter evolved in South America before their dispersal into Africa. Arnason et al. hypothesised that the Rio Grande–Walvis Ridge system was exposed above sea level and formed a chain of islands across the South Atlantic during the Maastrichtian and Palaeocene 70 to 65 Ma allowing the primates to disperse across the ocean. Other researchers dismiss the hypothesis of Arnason et al. instead favouring a less spectacular rafting event.

Other hints of transoceanic island hopping in the fossil record include Lavocatavis, a flightless terror bird found in Eocene layers in Algeria, the only one found outside South America.
