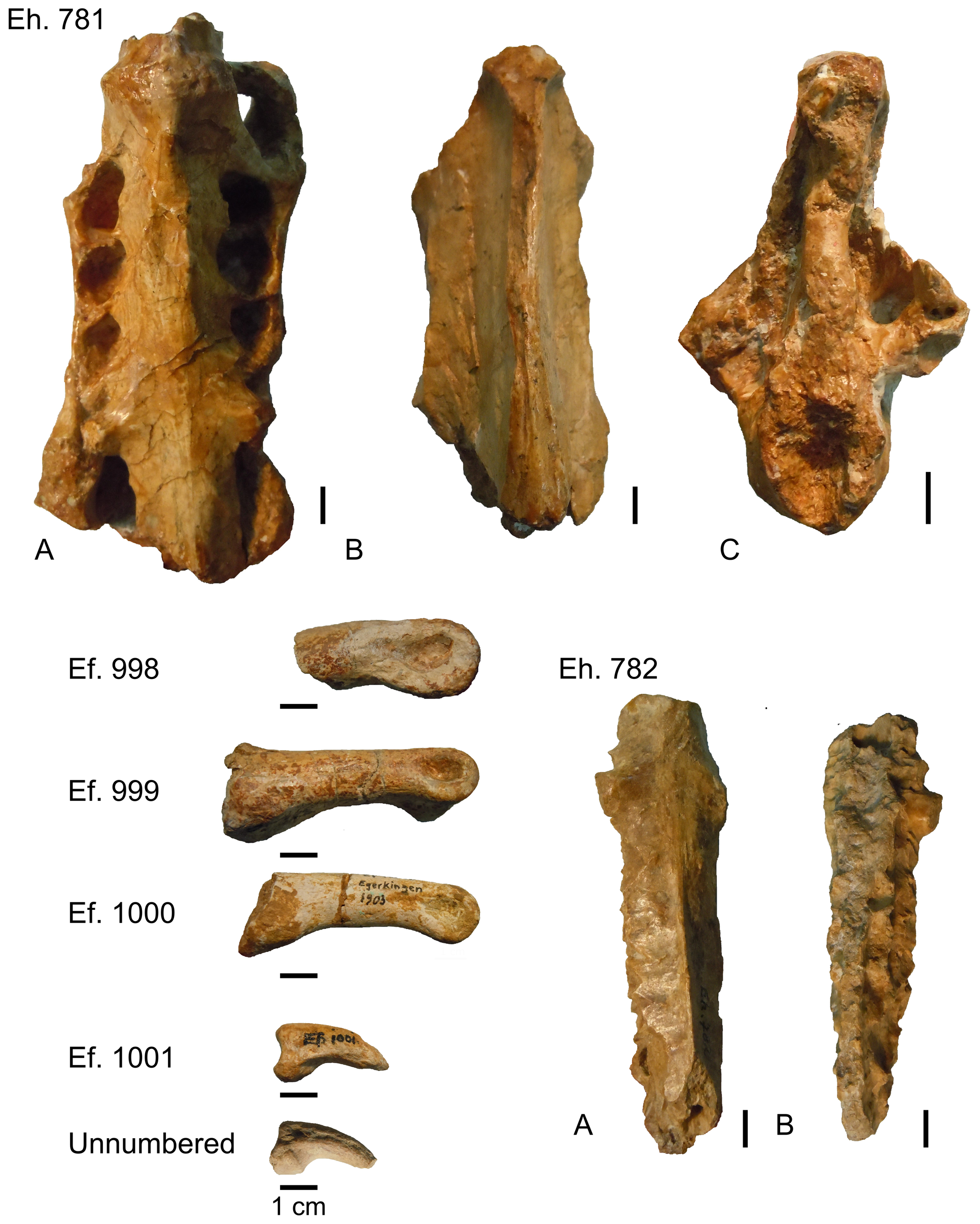
- E. cotei material from Switzerland

Scientific classification
- Kingdom: Animalia
- Phylum: Chordata
- Class: Aves
- Order: Cariamiformes
- Family: †Eleutherornithidae; Wetmore, 1951
- Genus: †Eleutherornis; Schaub, 1940
- Species: †E. cotei

Binomial name
- †Eleutherornis cotei (Gaillard, 1936)

Synonyms
- Diatryma cotei Gaillard 1936; Eleutherornis helveticus Schaub 1940

= Eleutherornis =

Eleutherornis Temporal range: Lutetian

Extinct genus of birds

Eleutherornis cotei is an extinct flightless predatory cariamiform bird which lived during the Middle Eocene of France and Switzerland. Since the early 20th century, researchers have initially described the fossils of Eleutherornis as separate taxa, some remains as a species of Gastornis and others as an ancient ratite related to modern ostriches. However, subsequent analyses have questioned the original interpretations, and a thorough reexamination in 2013 indicated that all of these described remains represent the same species.

It is estimated that Eleutherornis is a relatively tall bird that could grow up to 1.5 metres (4.9 ft) in total height. Paleontologists now agree that Eleutherornis certainly belongs to the order Cariamiformes, which includes the modern seriemas and the extinct Phorusrhacidae, a group of flightless predatory birds mainly known from the Americas. This makes Eleutherornis a relative of the phorusrhacids, with some researchers even suggesting that Eleutherornis is a European member of this group, though this claim has been disputed by others and additional material may be required for confirmation.

== History of discovery ==
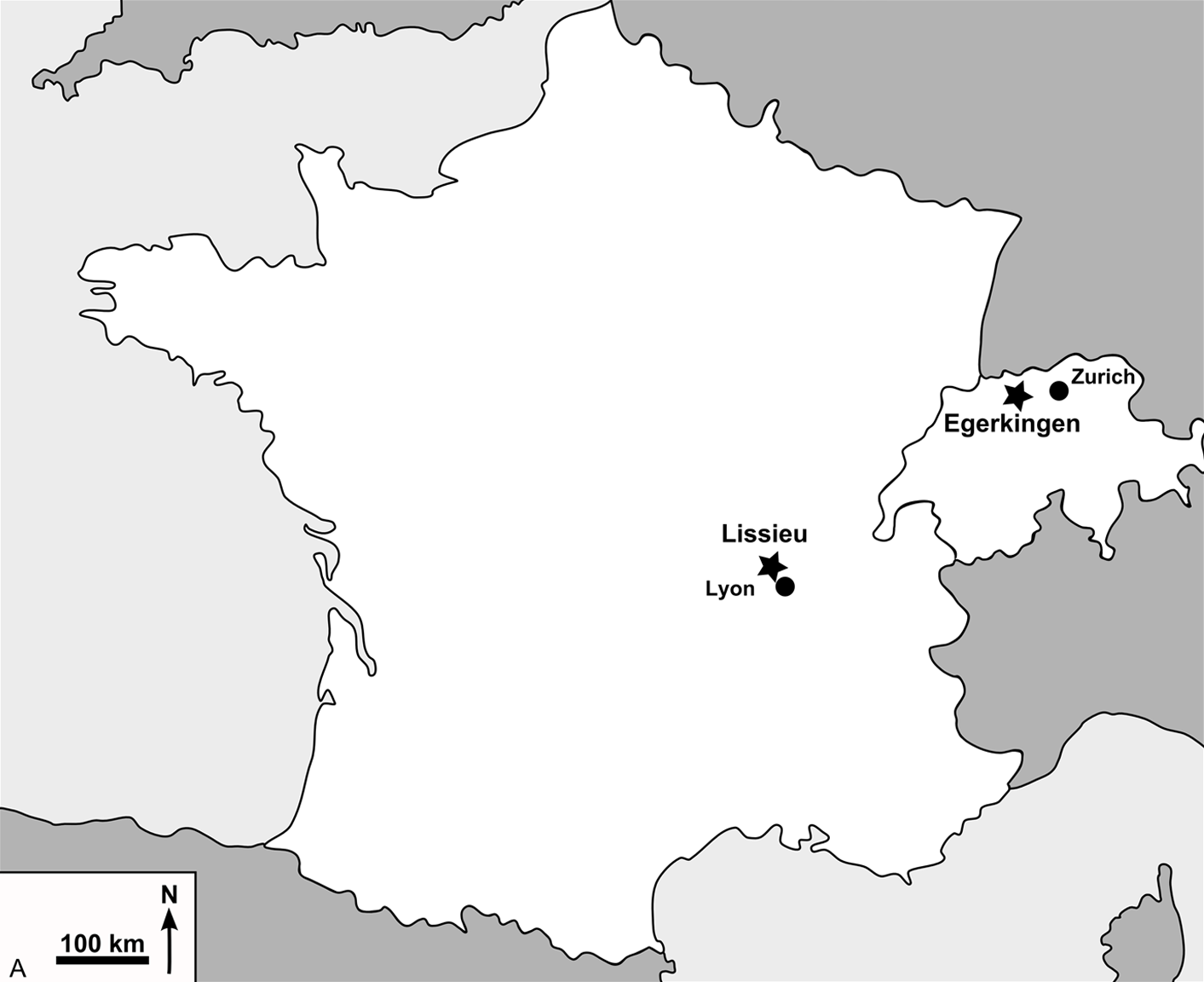
Location of E. cotei finds

The phalanges of Eleutherornis was first reported from Switzerland in Egerkingen by Schaub back in 1929, but he only classified them as Aves incertae sedis. From 1936 to 1937, Gaillard described the current type specimen of this taxon from France near Listeu, a municipality of the metropolis of Lyon, under the binomial name Diatryma cotei as a possible species of Gastornis (formerly Diatryma), and suggested that the phalanges reported by Schaub in 1929 resembles this species. In 1940, Schaub named Eleutherornis helveticus based on bird fossils from Switzerland which he considered as a ratite. In 1951, Wetmore placed Eleutherornis within its own family Eleutherornithidae under the order Struthioniformes, and the other putative ratite Proceriavis martini was also tentatively placed as a member of this family in 1979.

Subsequent analyses questioned the original interpretations, with D.? cotei considered as Aves incertae sedis outside the genus Gastornis, and with E. helveticus considered as a non-struthiform and a possible phorusrhacid instead. In 2009, the German paleontologist Gerald Mayr suggested that both D.? cotei and E. helveticus are neognaths and they possibly belong the same clade, while considering the putative ratite affinities of Proceriavis to be uncertain. This was confirmed through the reexaminations and comparisons of the specimens by Angst and colleagues in 2013, who considered both D.? cotei and E. helveticus to represent the same species based on virtually identical material and recombined the name of the taxon as Eleutherornis cotei.

== Description ==
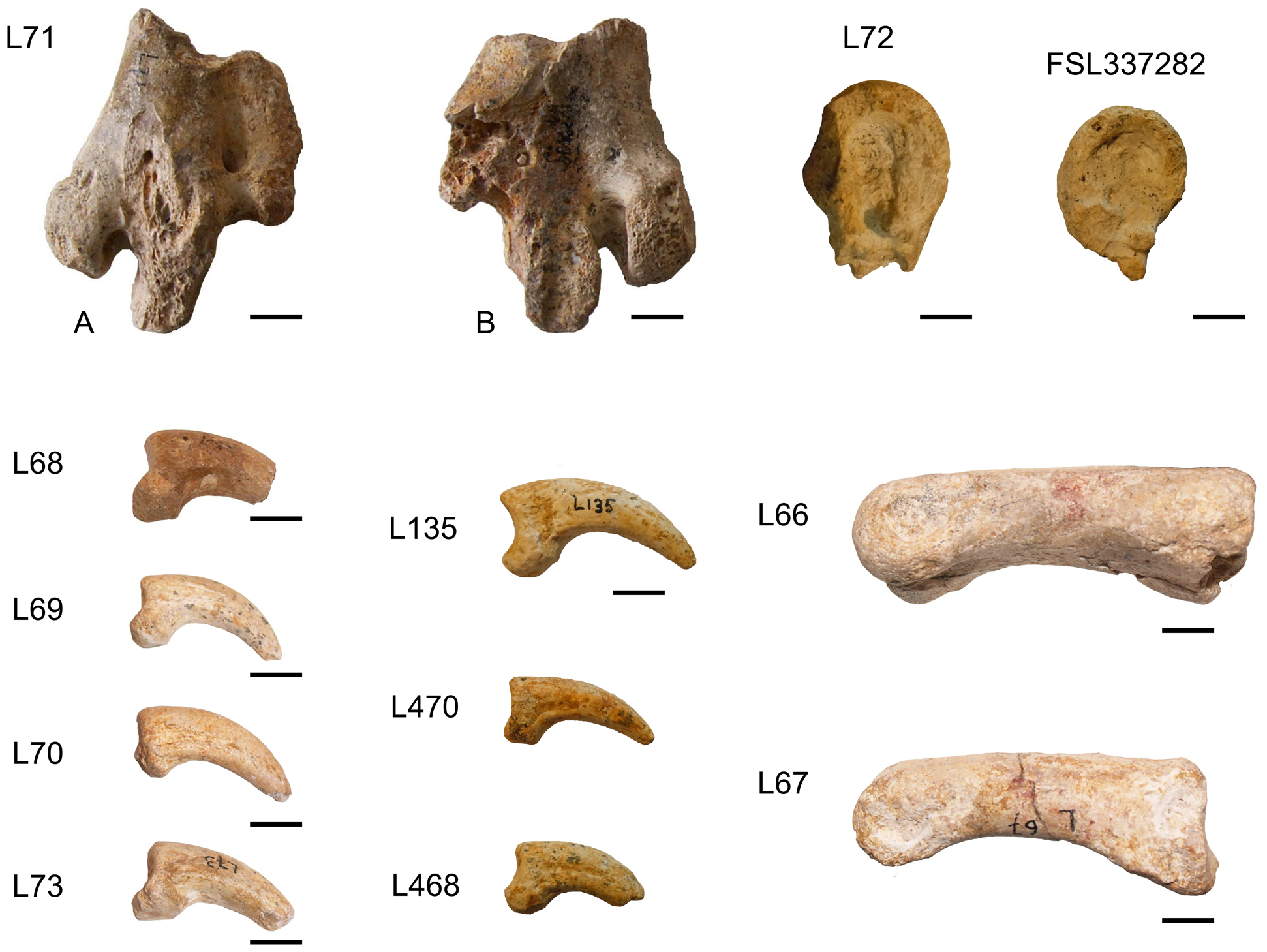
E. cotei material from France

Eleutherornis is the last known giant bird of Europe during the Paleogene, which stood up to 1.5 metres (4.9 ft) tall, roughly around the size of Patagornis. Its specimens show a combination of basal and derivative characters. Tarchlea of tarsometatarsus II is enlarged in its middle part as in psilopterines, while the pre-acetabulary of the ilium is more compressed laterally and more ventilated with neural spines of the synsacral vertebrae than in psilopterines, and thus recalls the more evolved phorusrhacids. Ungual phalanges are less compressed laterally and have a more developed flexor tubercle than those of the other cariamiform bird, Strigogyps.

== Classification ==
Angst and colleagues suggested that Eleutherornis is potentially the only known phorusrhacid in Europe and one of the few possible members of this family outside the Americas along with Lavocatavis. Gerald Mayr suggested that Eleutherornis more closely resembles other cariamiforms Strigogyps and ?Dynamopterus anthracinus, while Lavocatavis is likely more related to a possible paleognath Eremopezus, questioning the taxonomic placement of both taxa as phorusrhacids. Buffetaut and Angst, who previously assigned this taxon to phorusrhacids, criticized Mayr's classification in 2021 for his claim not being based on substantial morphological evidence, and that Eleutherornis is likely Phorusrhacidae incertae sedis.

Because the known fossils are fragmentary, definitive phylogenetic classification cannot be conducted, and Mayr still suggested that it is likely closer to Strigogyps in 2022, based on a biogeographical viewpoint and a morphological similarity of the tarsometatarsus and curved ungual phalanges from both taxa. While tentatively classified as a phorusrhacid in their 2024 study, LaBarge, Garderner and Organ excluded both Eleutherornis and Lavocatavis from phylogenetic analysis and considered their identity as phorusrhacids highly questionable.
