= Lavocatavis =

Lavocatavis Temporal range: Eocene 52–46 Ma

Scientific classification
- Kingdom: Animalia
- Phylum: Chordata
- Class: Aves
- Genus: †Lavocatavis; Mourer-Chauviré et al., 2011
- Species: †L. africana

Binomial name
- †Lavocatavis africana Mourer-Chauviré et al., 2011

Extinct genus of birds

Lavocatavis is an extinct genus of prehistoric bird from the Eocene of Algeria. A fossilized femur was described from the Glib Zegdou Formation in 2011 and is the only known specimen of Lavocatavis. The species was designated L. africana.

== Discovery and naming ==
The holotype of Lavocatavis, UM HGL 51-55, consists of an almost complete right femur. It is reasonably well preserved in the middle, but fragmentary at both ends. It originates from layer HGL 51 of the Glib Zegdou Formation of Algeria. The generic epithet (meaning "Lavocat's bird") was named in honor of René Lavocat, the person who first reported the earth layer of the holotype.

== Paleobiogeography ==
The oldest phorusrhacids are from South America and Antarctica, so if this genus were indeed a phorusrhacid, the ancestors of Lavocatavis might have migrated into Africa from the west. During the Eocene, the Atlantic Ocean separated South America from Africa by at least 1,000 kilometres (620 mi), ruling out a land migration. For a flightless terrestrial bird like Lavocatavis, the only means of entering Africa would have been through rafting on floating islands or island hopping. Currents traveled westward in the South Atlantic during the early Paleocene, making it unlikely that phorusrhacoids traveled on floating islands. The ancestors of Lavocatavis most likely traveled between very large islands that existed on what are now the submerged Rio Grande Rise and Walvis Ridge. However, it is also possible that the ancestors of Lavocatavis retained some of their flight ability and were able to travel between islands with more ease than flightless birds. If this was the case, Lavocatavis became flightless independently of other flightless phorusrhacoids, in a case of convergent evolution.

== Classification ==
Along with Eleutherornis, it has been considered as a possible member of the family Phorusrhacidae outside the Americas, but the taxonomic identity of both taxa is considered highly questionable. However, Gerald Mayr suggested that Eleutherornis more closely resembles other cariamiforms Strigogyps and ?Dynamopterus anthracinus, while Lavocatavis is likely more related to a possible paleognath Eremopezus, questioning the taxonomic placement of both taxa as phorusrhacids. Because the remains are too fragmentary, phylogenetic analysis cannot be conducted for both genera, and their relationships to phorusrhacids are only considered tentative.
