= Geology of Paraguay =

Approximate location of Mesoproterozoic (older than 1.3 Ga) cratons in South America and Africa

The country of Paraguay lies geologically at the borderzone between several cratons. Due to thick Cenozoic sediment cover and regolith development few outcrops are available in Paraguay. East of Paraguay River Precambrian and Early Paleozoic crystalline basement crop out mainly in the heights of Caapucú and Apa. The geological processes that have shaped Paraguay's bedrock and sedimentary basins are diverse including rifting, marine sedimentation, metamorphism, eruption of flood basalts and alkaline potassic volcanism.

== Pre-Silurian basement ==
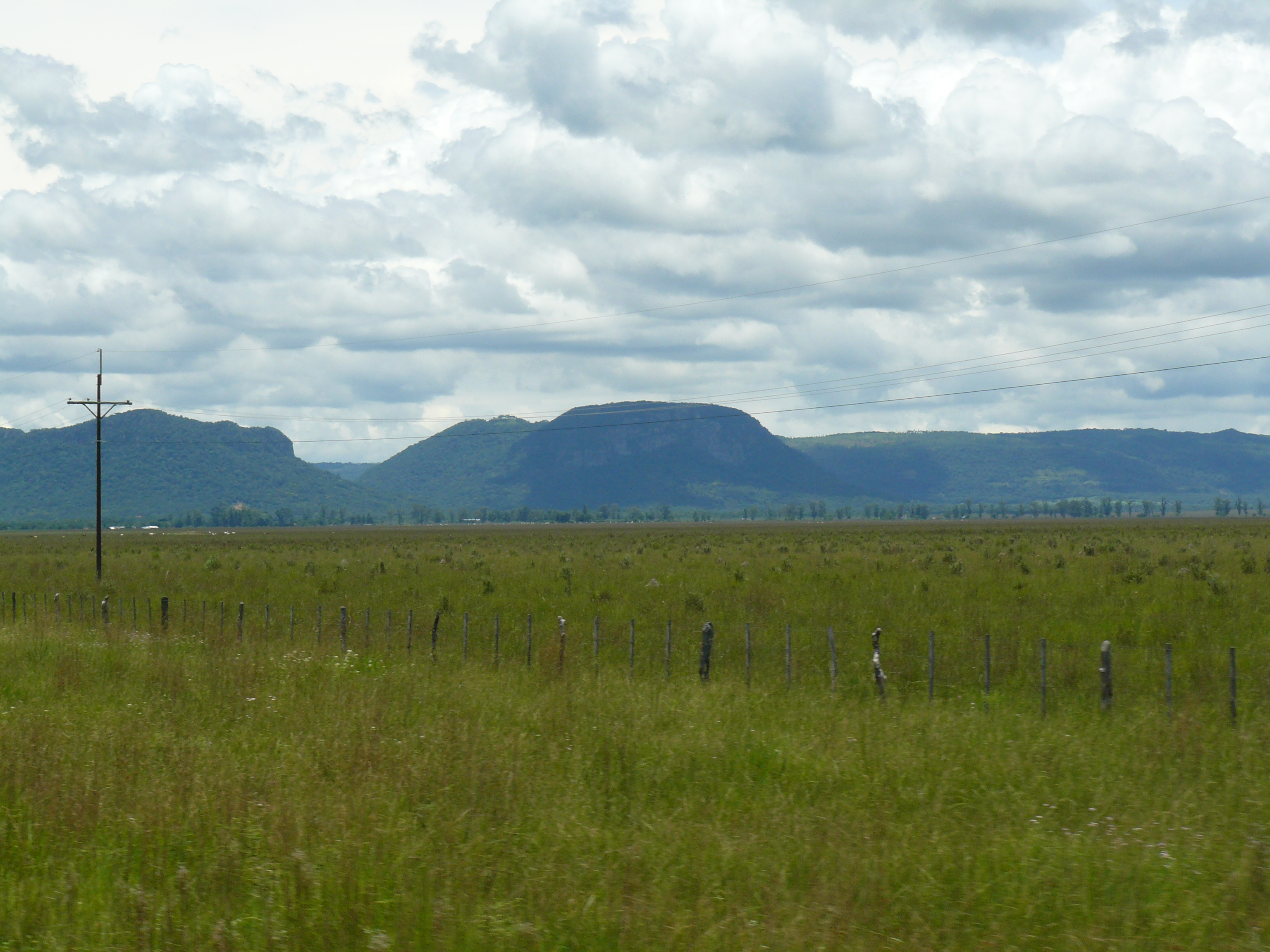
Serranías de Paraguarí in Paraguarí Department are made of Silurian sandstone of the Misiones Formation and alkaline intrusives of Early Cretaceous age.

=== Caapucú High ===
Caapucú High (formerly called Precámbrico Sur and Saliente del Pilar) is the Northwesternmost outcrop of Río de la Plata Craton. The rocks found in the Caapucú High include porphyritic granitic rocks, orthogneisses, paragneisses, amphibolites, migmatites, talc schists and rhyolite dykes. During the Brasiliano Cycle (576-480 Ma ago) the area of the Caapucú height suffered a major magmatic event.

=== Apa High ===
The formations at the Apa High include metamorphosed limestone of Vendian Age and granites, metasediments, mafic gneisses and granitoid-pegmatititic intrusvies of Late Proterozoic age. The Apa high is often considered the southernmost outcrop of the Central Brazilian Shield (also called Guaporé Shield) which is sometimes considered to form one sole shield (or at least craton) with the Guyana Shield called the Amazonian Shield.

== Sedimentary Basins ==
=== Paraná Basin ===
The Paraná Basin is a large sedimentary basin situated in the central-eastern part of South America. About 75% of its areal distribution occurs in Brazil, from Mato Grosso to Rio Grande do Sul states. The remainder area is distributed in eastern Paraguay, northeastern Argentina and northern Uruguay. The shape of the depression is elliptical and covers an area of about 1,500,000 km^{2} (580,000 sq mi), of which 110,000 km^{2} are in Paraguay. The basin developed during the Paleozoic and the Mesozoic with a sedimentary record comprising rocks from the Ordovician right up to the Cretaceous, thus spanning the time interval between 460 and 66 million years. The maximum thickness of the infill reaches 7,000 m in its central area and is composed of sedimentary and igneous rocks.

The Paraná Basin is a typical intra-cratonic flexural basin, although during the Paleozoic it was a gulf that opened to the southwest. The basin genesis is related to the convergence between the former Gondwana supercontinent and the oceanic crust of the former Panthalassa ocean. The basin formed, at least during the Paleozoic orogenesis of the Gondwanides, a foreland basin.

The Paraná River, that forms Paraguay's eastern boundary, flows along the central axis of the Paraná Basin and drains the modern basin.

=== Chaco Basin ===
The Chaco region that makes up the northwestern half (~60%) of Paraguay is a modern foreland basin that extends into Argentina and Bolivia where it borders the Andean thrust front. Superficially the Chaco Basin is an alluvial basin composed of land-derived (in contrast to marine sediments) material, mostly fine sand and clays of Paleogene, Neogene and Quaternary age. On deeper levels the Paraguayan Chaco is made up by four sub-basins, the Pirizal, Pilar, Carandaity and Curupaity basins.

Carandaity and Curupaity in the northwest are chieftly composed of Paleozoic sediments.

Pirizal (also called Pirity) Basin is made up mostly of Late Cretaceous and younger sediments. The Pilar Basin is located mainly on Presidente Hayes Department and borders the Paraná Basin across Paraguay River to the east, geologically the basins are separated by the Asunción Anticline that roughly follows the path of Paraguay River.

== Volcanic Provinces ==
=== Alto Paraguay volcanics ===
In Alto Paraguay Department 240 Ma old alkaline volcanic rocks underlies younger sediments. In the 1970s these rocks were studied for their potential to host valuable phosphate and uranium minerals.

=== Paraná Igneous Province ===
In a strip along Paraná River tholeiitic basalts belonging to the Paraná Traps makes up most of the bedrock and overlies earlier sediments of the Paraná Basin. These tholeiites were erupted in the Early Cretaceous in association with the initial opening of the South Atlantic. The Cretaceous volcanism did also create minor outcrops of potassic alkaline volcanics in a graben structure developed between Asunción and Villarrica and in Amambay Department. Cretaceous volcanism did also leave small units of sodic alkaline rocks in Misiones Department in southern Paraguay.
