= Sierra Leone hotspot =

Proposed hotspot in the Atlantic Ocean

Sierra Leone hotspot is a proposed hotspot in the Atlantic Ocean.

The existence of this hotspot has been inferred from the Sierra Leone Rise and the Ceara Rise in the Atlantic Ocean, two submarine topographic features around the 5th parallel north. They formed as a single oceanic plateau that was subsequently split by the Mid-Atlantic Ridge during the Jurassic and Cretaceous (Aptian).

According to the proposal by Basile et al. 2020, the Sierra Leone hotspot 201 million years ago was at the centre of the Central Atlantic Magmatic Province, north of the Blake Plateau off North America. The hotspot 180–170 million years ago formed a first oceanic plateau that was subsequently split by the Mid-Atlantic Ridge around 100 million years ago, forming the Demerara Plateau and Guinea Rise. Between 90 and 70 million years ago the hotspot was under the African Plate, forming the northern Bathymetrists Seamounts. The Mid-Atlantic Ridge eventually reached the hotspot, resulting 82–55 million years ago in the formation of a second oceanic plateau which was again split by the Mid-Atlantic Ridge to form the Ceara Rise and Sierra Leone Rise. Since then, the Sierra Leone hotspot would have been again located on the African Plate, now generating the southern group of the Bathymetrists Seamounts. 10 million years ago it generated the Knipovich seamount.

The hotspot is currently located about 100 kilometres (62 mi) west of Knipovich seamount; it is presently inactive. According to an alternative proposal by Long et al. 2020, the hotspot would now be centered on 5.28°N 25.3°W above a seismic velocity anomaly in the mantle and in a cluster of seamounts. A final proposal in 2026 was that there is no mantle plume, just a mantle domain that produces unusually high quantities of melt at the Mid-Atlantic Ridge.

Other structures influenced by the hotspot:

- The Bahamas may be a hotspot track of the Sierra Leone hotspot, which between 170 and 155 million years ago may have been active on the North American Plate.
- The east–west trending Bathymetrists Seamounts north of the Sierra Leone Rise. They were capped by carbonates during the mid-Eocene. Some of the northern seamounts however produce problems in plate tectonic reconstructions if they are correlated to the Sierra Leone hotspot.
- Syenites on the Îles de Los may be a product of the hotspot.
- Certain segments of the Mid-Atlantic Ridge may be influenced by the hotspot.
- Knipovich seamount rises to a depth of 600 metres (2,000 ft) below sea level and has a 12 by 6 kilometres (7.5 mi × 3.7 mi) summit.
- Plate motion changes during the Paleocene may have been driven by the torque from the Sierra Leone hotspot.
