= Karoo-Ferrar =

Two large igneous provinces in Southern Africa and Antarctica respectively

The Karoo and Ferrar large igneous provinces (LIPs), in Southern Africa and Antarctica respectively, collectively known as the Karoo-Ferrar, Gondwana, or Southeast African LIP, are associated with the initial break-up of the Gondwana supercontinent at c. 183 Ma. Its flood basalt mostly covers South Africa and Antarctica, but portions extend further into southern Africa and into South America, India, Australia and New Zealand.

Karoo-Ferrar formed just prior to the breakup of Gondwana in the Lower Jurassic epoch, about 183 million years ago; this timing corresponds to the early Toarcian anoxic event and the Pliensbachian-Toarcian extinction. It covered about 3 million km^{2}. The total original volume of the flow, which extends over a distance in excess of 6000 km (4000 km in Antarctica alone), was in excess of 2.5 million km^{3} (2.5 million cubic kilometres).

The Ferrar LIP is notable for long-distance transport and the Karoo LIP for its large volume and chemical diversity.

The igneous activity of the Karoo LIP began c. 204 Ma at the northern margin of the province. The long-lasting Chon-Aike Province in Patagonia, the Antarctic Peninsula, and Ellsworth Land was activated c. 190 Ma in an unstable tectonic environment in which both extension and subduction occurred. Chon-Aike had a peak between 183 to 173 Ma but produced continued magmatism between 168 to 141 Ma. By 184 to 175 Ma the Karoo magmatism had spread to Namibia, Lesotho, Lebombo, and the Ferrar province in Antarctica. The Karoo LIP ended 145 Ma with peripheral eruptions in Patagonia, the Antarctica Peninsula, northern South Africa, Kerala in India, and southeast Australia. The Karoo Province uplifted southern Africa c. 1.5 km (0.93 mi) and broke East Gondwana (India, Antarctica, and Australia) away from West Gondwana (South America and Africa) beginning in the opening of the Weddell Sea.

In the Cretaceous, some 15 million years after the last Karoo eruption, renewed magmatism was initiated between Mary Byrd Land in Antarctica and New Zealand from where it spread along Gondwana's southern margin, from eastern Australia to the Antarctic Peninsula. Isotopic dating suggests a series of igneous events at 133–131, 124–119, and 113–107 Ma in Australia; 110–99 Ma in Mary Byrd Land; 114-109 and 82 Ma in New Zealand; and 141 and 127 Ma in the Antarctic Peninsula. This phase of magmatism resulted in extension and rift between Australia and Antarctica, Australia and Lord Howe Rise, and Mary Byrd Land and New Zealand.

== Ferrar Supergroup ==
According to Robert John Pankhurst, "The Ferrar Supergroup is well known as being representative of a Middle Jurassic (and partly later), Gondwana-wide continental flood basalts event which includes Tasmanian dolerites, the Karoo Supergroup of southern Africa and the Serra Geral basalts of central South America." These continental tholeiites are indicative of a large-scale extensional rift system and associated Middle Jurassic magmatic activity linked to the break-up of Gondwana 25 m.y. later, when East Antarctica separated from Africa, and the Mozambique Basin opened. Included in the supergroup are the Ferrar Dolerite sills and dykes, the Kirkpatrick Basalts, and the volcanogenic Carapace Sandstone and Mawson Formation.

== See also ==
- Discovery Seamounts – Chain of seamounts in the Southern Atlantic Ocean
- Chon Aike Formation
