= St. Helena Seamount chain =

Underwater chain of seamounts in the southern Atlantic Ocean

- Location within South Atlantic

Location
- Location: South Atlantic Ocean
- Coordinates: 15°44′29.3″S 6°25′52.5″W

The St. Helena Seamount chain, also known as the St. Helena Seamounts, is an underwater chain of seamounts in the southern Atlantic Ocean. The chain has been formed by the movement of the African Plate over the Saint Helena hotspot.
