= St. Helena hotspot =

Volcanic hotspot in the Atlantic Ocean

Coordinates: 16°S 6°W

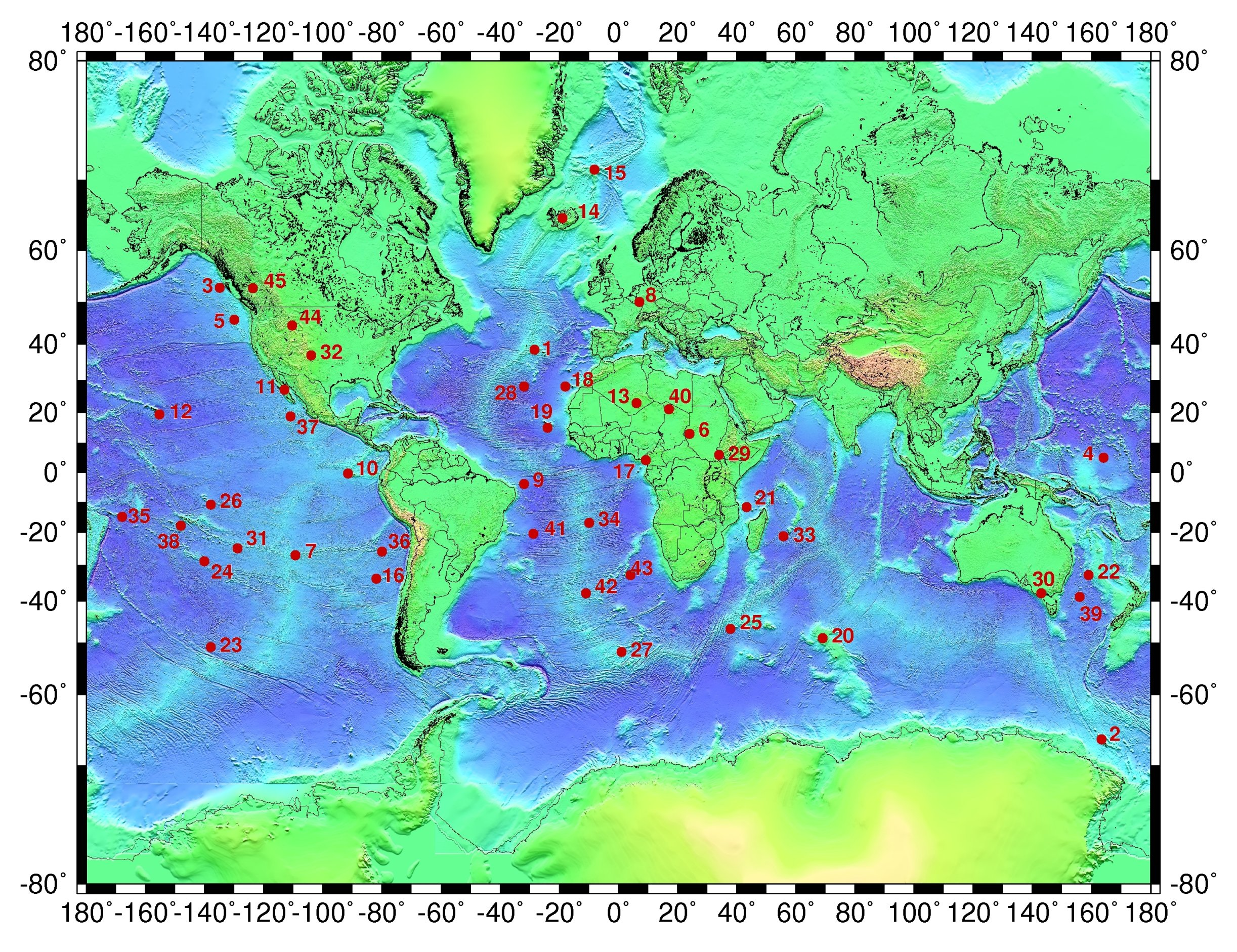
The St. Helena hotspot is marked 34 on map.

The St. Helena hotspot is a volcanic hotspot located in the southern Atlantic Ocean. It is responsible for the island of St. Helena and the St. Helena Seamount chain. It is one of the oldest known hotspots on Earth, which began to produce basaltic lava about 145 million years ago.
