= Rio Grande Rise =

Aseismic ocean ridge in the Atlantic Ocean off the coast of Brazil

Coordinates: 31°S 35°W

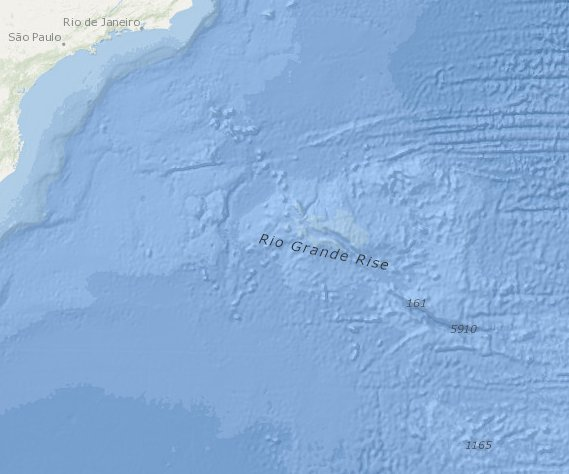
The Rio Grande Rise separates the Brazil (north) and Argentine Basins (south) and is separated from the Vema Sill and Santos Plain (west) by the Vema Channel and from the Mid-Atlantic Ridge by the Hunter Channel (east).

The Rio Grande Rise, also called the Rio Grande Elevation or Bromley Plateau, is an aseismic ocean ridge in the southern Atlantic Ocean off the coast of Brazil. Together with the Walvis Ridge off Africa, the Rio Grande Rise forms a V-shaped structure of mirrored hotspot tracks or seamount chains across the northern South Atlantic. In 2013, Brazilian scientists announced that they found granite boulders on the Rio Grande Rise and speculated that it could be the remains of a submerged continent, which they called the "Brazilian Atlantis". Other researchers, however, noted that such boulders can end up on the ocean floor by less speculative means.

Brazil proposes the area as part of its continental shelf since December 2018, but it has yet to be approved by the Commission on the Limits of the Continental Shelf. It is far beyond the country's exclusive economic zone and would thus be part of its extended continental shelf.

== Geology ==
The Rio Grande Rise separates the Santos and Campos Basins and is composed of western and eastern areas, which have different geological backgrounds. The western area has numerous guyots and seamounts and a basement dated to 80 to 87 million years ago. The eastern area is covered by fracture zones and may represent an abandoned spreading centre. In the western area, volcanic breccia and layers of ash indicate widespread volcanism during the Eocene, which coincides with the formation of volcanic rocks onshore. During this period, parts of the western plateau were uplifted over sea level and short-lived volcanic islands formed.

When West Gondwana (i.e. South America) broke away from Africa during the Early Cretaceous (146 to 100 Ma), the South Atlantic opened up from its southern to its northern end. In this process, the voluminous Paraná and Etendeka continental flood basalts formed in what is now Brazil and Namibia. This event is linked to the Tristan-Gough hotspot, now located near the Mid-Atlantic Ridge, close to Tristan da Cunha and the Gough Islands. During the Maastrichtian (60 Ma), the orientation of spreading changed, which is still visible on the African side, and volcanism ended on the American side. This process resulted in the Tristan-Gough seamount chains on either side of the Tristan-Gough hotspot.

=== Palaeoclimatic role ===
A Brazilian-Japanese expedition in 2013 recovered in situ granitic and metamorphic rocks on the Rio Grande Rise. This can possibly indicate that the plateau includes fragments of continental crust — possible remains of micro-continents similar to those found on and around Kerguelen in the Indian Ocean and Jan Mayen in the Arctic Ocean. The existence of such microcontinents is speculative, however, since their remains tend to be covered by younger layers of lava and sediments. Nevertheless, transoceanic dispersals are hinted at by the fossil record of, for example, flightless birds such as Lavocatavis, indicating that several islands between Africa and South America made island hopping possible across the Atlantic during the Tertiary (66 to 2.58 Ma).

At the beginning of the Maastrichtian, the characteristics of water masses differed north and south of the Rio Grande Rice-Walvis Ridge complex. The disappearance of these differences during the Maastritchtian indicates a reorganisation of oceanic circulation patterns that lead to a global homogenisation of intermediate and deep waters. This process seems to have been triggered by the breaching of the Rio Grande Rise-Walvis Ridge complex and the disappearance of epicontinental seaways such as the Tethys Ocean. The process resulted in the deterioration of rudist-dominated tropical habitats and consequently the extinction of benthic inoceramid bivalves.

The origin of modern circulation of cold, deep water — known as the "Big Flush" — is associated with Early Eocene (55 to 40 Ma) geological events; tectonism that resulted in the opening of the north-east Atlantic and fracture zones that developed in the subsiding Rio Grande Rise, which allowed cold water from the Antarctic Weddell Sea to flow northward into the North Atlantic. 40 Ma, the generation of cold bottom water in the Antarctic resulted in the formation of psychrospheric fauna in the Atlantic and Tethys, which today live in temperatures below 10 °C (50 °F). This global distribution suggests that the Rio Grande Rise had been breached by this time, allowing cold, dense water to move north-south through a corridor enhancing the transition from a latitudinal thermospheric circulation to a meridional thermohaline circulation.

== See also ==
- Vitória-Trindade Ridge - a line of seamounts and islands that are also in the South Atlantic of the coast of Brazil at 20^{o} South, caused by a volcanic hot spot 1,000 km (540 nmi; 620 mi) to the north.
