= Paraná and Etendeka traps =

Large igneous province in South America and Africa

Paraná and Etendeka traps Paraná and Etendeka Plateau or Paraná and Etendeka Province
- Large igneous province
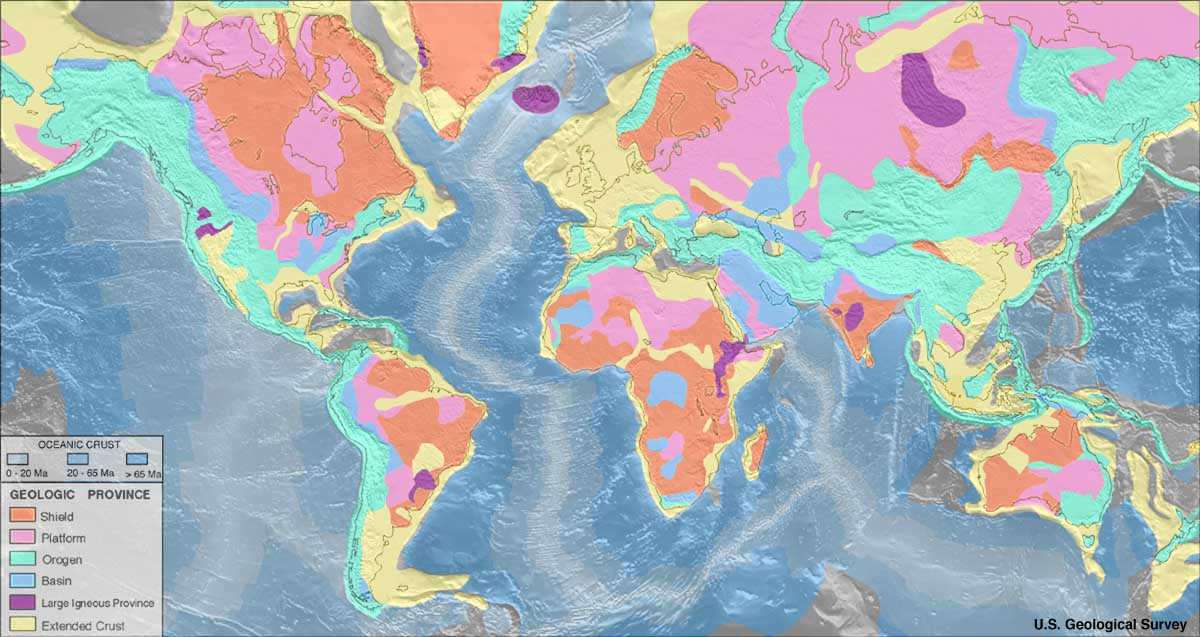
- The Paraná and Etendeka traps shown as dark purple spot on the geologic map of South America
- Location: eastern Brazil, Uruguay, northwest Namibia & southwest Angola
- Part of: Paraná Basin
- Water bodies: Southern Atlantic
- Age: Early Cretaceous; 138-128 Ma
- Formed by: Break-up of Pangaea
- Geology: Serra Geral Formation

Area
  - Total: 1,500,000 km^{2} (580,000 sq mi)
- Last eruption: Barremian

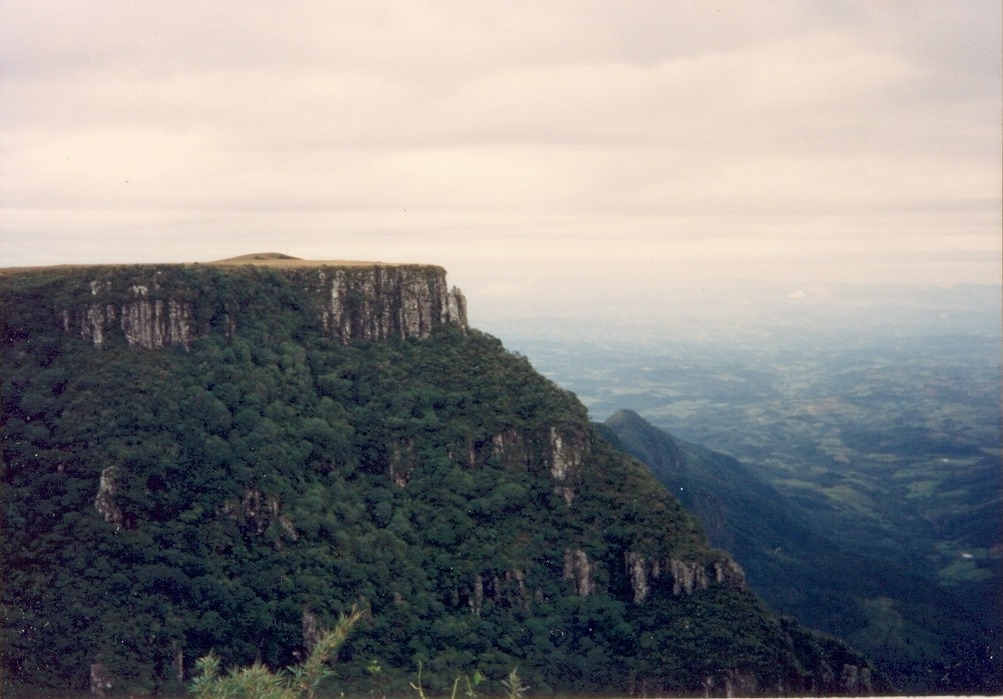
A cliff at the Paraná Magmatic Province. Rio do Rastro, Santa Catarina. One can see the near vertical escarpment of silicic succession from waning-stage volcanism.

The Paraná-Etendeka Large Igneous Province (PE-LIP) (or Paraná and Etendeka Plateau; or Paraná and Etendeka Province) is a large igneous province that includes both the main Paraná traps (in Paraná Basin, a South American geological basin) as well as the smaller severed portions of the flood basalts at the Etendeka traps (in northwest Namibia and southwest Angola). The original basalt flows occurred 136 to 132 million years ago. The province had a post-flow surface area of 1,000,000 square kilometres (390,000 sq mi) and an original volume projected to be in excess of 2.3 million km^{3}.

== Geodynamics ==
The basalt samples at Paraná and Etendeka have an age of about 132 Ma, during the Valanginian stage of the Early Cretaceous. Indirectly, the rifting and extension are probably the origin of the Paraná and Etendeka traps and it could be the origin of the Gough and Tristan da Cunha Islands as well, as they are connected by the Walvis Ridge (Gough/Tristan hotspot). The seamounts of the Rio Grande Rise (25°S to 35°S) that go eastwards from the Paraná side are part of this traps system.

== Description ==
Interpretations of geochemistry, including isotopes, have led geologists to conclude that the magmas forming the traps and associated igneous rocks originated by melting of asthenosphic mantle due to the arrival of a mantle plume to the base of Earth's lithosphere. Then much of the magma was contaminated with crustal materials prior to their eruption. Some plutonic rocks related to the traps escaped crustal contamination reflecting more directly the source of the magmas in the mantle.

== Silicic eruptions ==
In Paraná, the silicic rocks are divided into two compositional groups, the Palmas volcanics and Chapecó volcanics. Palmas is recognized as composed of the five geochemical subtypes Santa Maria, Caxias do Sul, Anita Garibaldi, Clevelândia and Jacuí, while Chapecó is composed of the three geochemical subtypes Ourinhos, Tamarana and Guarapuav. Eight major eruptive units, labeled PAV-A to -G and BRA-21, are recognized within Palmas volcanics.

In Etendeka, individual eruptive units of quartz latite are grouped into high-Ti and low-Ti suites. The high-Ti suit is composed of six members: Naudé, Sarusas, Elliott, Khoraseb, and Ventura. The low-Ti suite is composed of eight members: Fria, Beacon, Grootberg, Wereldsend, Hoanib, Springbok, Goboboseb, and Terrace. In particular, Goboboseb consists of four eruptive units, labeled Goboboseb-I to -IV.

On the basis of trans-Atlantic chemostratigraphy, the low-Ti suite in Etendeka is equivalent to Palmas volcanics in Paraná, and the high-Ti suite is equivalent to Chapecó volcanics. At a finer scale, geochemical affinities have made tentative correlations in these pairs: PAV-G of Anita Garibaldi and Beacon, PAV-B of Caxias do Sul and Springbok, PAV-A of Jacuí and Goboboseb-II, Guarapuava and Ventura, Ourinhos and Khoraseb, BRA-21 and Wereldsend, PAV-F of Caxias do Sul and Grootberg. Sarusas may correlate either to Guarapuava or Tamarana, and Fria may correlate either to Santa Maria or Clevelândia.

=== Eruption style and volume ===
In Etendeka, the quartz latite units are interpreted to be rheomorphic ignimbrites, which are emplaced by explosive eruptions of high-temperature ash-flows. Each eruption produced voluminous and widespread pyroclastic sheets with thicknesses between 40–300 m (130–980 feet). Individual unit, within Etendeka, has a volume between 400–2,600 km^{3} (96–624 cubic miles) and covers an area up to 8,800 km^{2} (3,400 square miles). No air-fall layer associated with the eruptions has been recognized. A 18 km (11 miles) diameter, circular structure, called Messum igneous complex, is identified to be the eruptive centre for Goboboseb-I to -IV and Springbok.

It was postulated that Chapecó and Palmas volcanics in Paraná are the eastward extensions of Etendeka ash-flows, so each correlation represents a huge ignimbrite eruption. The volumes of these eruptions would make them the largest known explosive eruptions on Earth. Notably, the largest Guarapuava-Tamarana/Sarusas is estimated to have a volume of 8,600 km^{3} (2,100 cubic miles), which dwarfs other extremely large eruptions such as 30 million year old Wah Wah Springs and 28 million year old Fish Canyon Tuff. This interpretation, however, is disputed. Sarusas member is known to consist of 10 eruptive units hence a product of multiple eruptions. Moreover, units of each province are not the exact correlatives of the same eruptive event but may share the same magmatic system.

In contrast, Chapecó and Palmas volcanics in Paraná are not unambiguously identified as the eastward extensions of ash-flows. Most studies have characterized Chapecó and Palmas as stacks of local lava flows and lava domes produced by effusive eruptions, and were emitted from nearby silicic conduits and feeder dikes. The extremely large volume estimations and explosive style of them, therefore, are questioned. On the other hand, a study has found pyroclastic-like textures in Chapecó and Palmas volcanics that are indicative of explosive eruptions. Guarapuava and Clevelândia subtypes are interpreted to be entirely of ignimbrites, while Jacuí, Anita Garibaldi, Caxias do Sul, and Santa Maria are multiple ignimbrite units intercalated with lava domes. These ignimbrites were characterzied by low-explosivity, high eruptive mass-flux, and low-column fountains.

== See also ==
- Geology of Paraguay
- Geology of Uruguay
- Paraná Basin
- Uruguayan dyke swarms
