= Walvis Ridge =

Aseismic ocean ridge in the southern Atlantic Ocean

African continent with Walvis Ridge (arrows) extending to southwest

The Walvis Ridge (walvis means whale in Dutch and Afrikaans) is an aseismic ocean ridge in the southern Atlantic Ocean. More than 3,000 km (1,900 mi) in length, it extends from the Mid-Atlantic Ridge, near Tristan da Cunha and the Gough Islands, to the African coast (at 18°S in northern Namibia). The Walvis Ridge is one of few examples of a hotspot seamount chain that links a flood basalt province to an active hotspot. It is also considered one of the most important hotspot tracks because the Tristan Hotspot is one of few primary or deep mantle hotspots.

== Geology ==
Apart from the Mid-Atlantic Ridge, the Walvis Ridge and the Rio Grande Rise are the most distinctive feature of the South Atlantic sea floor. They originated from hotspot volcanism and together they form a mirrored symmetry across the Mid-Atlantic Ridge, with the Tristan Hotspot at its centre. Two of the distinct sections in the Walvis Ridge have similar mirrored regions in the Rio Grande Rise; for example, the eastern section of the Walvis Ridge evolved in conjunction with the Torres Arch (the western end of the Rio Grande Rise, off the Brazilian coast) and, as the South Atlantic gradually opened, these structures became separated. The complex of seamounts in the western end of the Walvis Ridge, however, does not have a similar structure on the American side, but there is a Zapiola Seamount Complex south of the eastern end of the Rio Grande Rise. The formation of this mirrored structure is the result of the opening of the South Atlantic some 120 Mya and the Paraná and Etendeka continental flood basalts, the lateral-most parts of the structure, formed at the beginning of this process in areas that are now located in Brazil and Namibia.

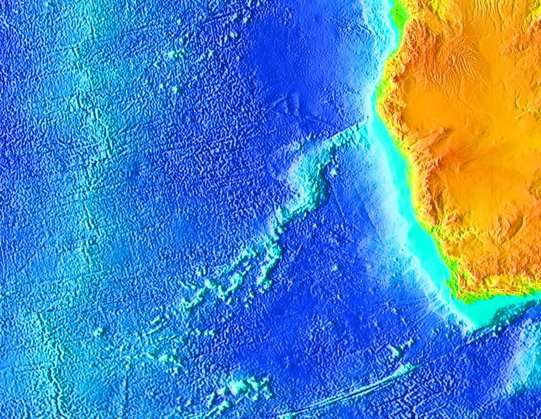
The Walvis Ridge stretches some 3,000 km (1,900 mi) from the African continental shelf to the Tristan da Cunha hotspot, separating the Angola and Cape Basins.

The Walvis Ridge is divided into three main sections:

1. A first 600 km (370 mi) long segment stretching from Africa to approximately longitude 6°E and varying in width between 90–200 km (56–124 mi).
2. A second section, 500 km (310 mi) long, stretching north–south, and narrower than the first section.
3. A third more discontinuous section, which is marked by seamounts and connects the Walvis Ridge to the Mid-Atlantic Ridge.

Cretaceous kimberlites in the central Democratic Republic of Congo and Angola align with the Walvis Ridge.

The Tristan-Gough hotspot track first formed over the mantle plume that formed the Etendeka-Paraná continental flood basalts some 135 to 132 Ma. The eastern section of the ridge is thought to have been created in the Middle Cretaceous period, between 120 to 80 Ma. While the mantle plume remained large and stable, the eastern Walvis Ridge formed along with the Rio Grande Rise over the Mid-Atlantic Ridge. During the Maastrichtian 60 million years ago, the orientation of spreading changed, which is still visible in the orientation of the various sections of the Walvis Ridge. The mantle plume then gradually became unstable and bifurcated 60 to 70 Ma to produce the two separate Tristan and Gough hotspot tracks. It finally disintegrated 35 to 45 Ma and formed the guyot province in the western end of the ridge.

Hundreds of volcanic explosions were recorded on the Walvis Ridge in 2001 and 2002. These explosions seemed to come from an unnamed seamount on the northern side of the ridge and are thought to be unrelated to the Tristan hotspot.

The Ewing Seamount is part of the ridge.

=== Palaeoclimatic role ===
The Eocene Layer of Mysterious Origin (Elmo) is a period of global warming that occurred 53.7 Ma, about two million years after the Paleocene–Eocene Thermal Maximum. This period manifests as a carbonate-poor red clay layer unique to the Walvis Ridge and is similar to the PETM, but of smaller magnitude.

== Oceanography ==
The Walvis Ridge is a natural obstacle for the Agulhas rings, mesoscale warm core rings that are shed from the Agulhas Current south of the Agulhas Bank. In average, five such rings are shed each year, a number that varies considerably between years. The rings tend cross the Walvis Ridge at its deepest part, but they still lose transitional speed and many rings decay rapidly. Their transitional speed drops from 5.2±3.6 km/day to 4.6±3.1 km/day, but it is not clear how much the Walvis Ridge is responsible for this drop, since the rings' speed drops to 4.3±2.2 km/day between the Walvis Ridge and the Mid-Atlantic Ridge. The rings can cross the South Atlantic in 2.5–3 years but only two thirds make it farther than the Walvis Ridge. When the rings pass over the Cap Basin south of the Walvis Ridge they are frequently disturbed by the Benguela Current, interaction between rings, and bottom topography such as the Vema Seamount, but there are fewer obstacles and disturbances west of the Walvis Ridge were the rings tend stabilise. The Agulhas rings transport an estimated 1-5 Sv (millions m^{3}/s) of water from the Indian Ocean to the South Atlantic.

Originating around Antarctica, Antarctic Bottom Water (AABW) enters the Cape Basin between the Agulhas Bank and the Agulhas Ridge after which it flows west north of the Agulhas Ridge. AABW then retroflects at the south-western end of the Walvis Ridge, flows north-east along the ridge before being retroflected south by North Atlantic Deep Water, with which it exits the Cape Basin and flows into the Indian Ocean.
