= Shona hotspot =

Volcanic hotspot in the Atlantic Ocean

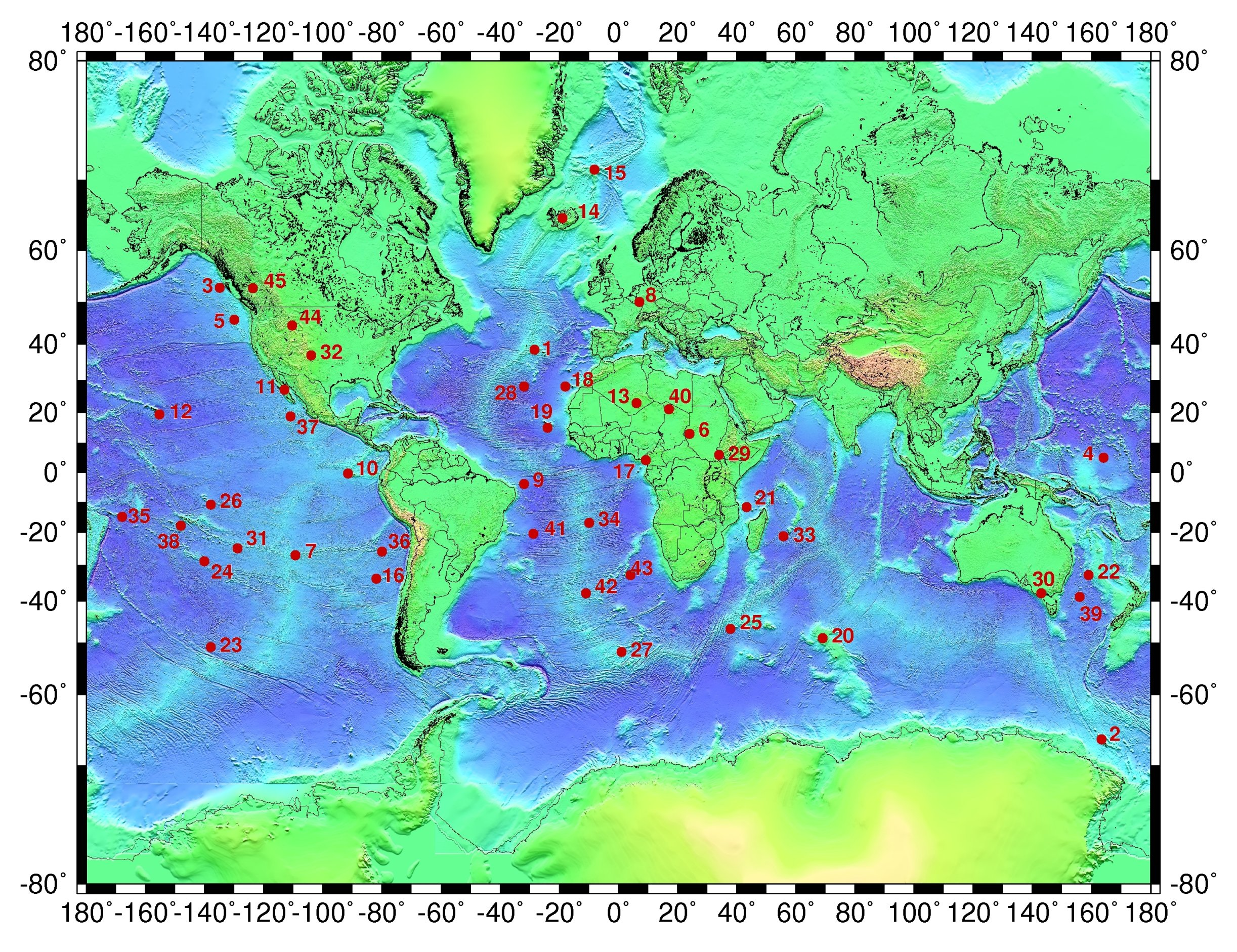
The Meteor hotspot is marked 27 on map.

The Shona or Meteor hotspot is a volcanic hotspot located in the southern Atlantic Ocean. Its zig-zag-shaped hotspot track, a chain of seamounts and ridges, stretches from its current location at or near the southern end of the Mid-Atlantic Ridge to South Africa.

== Location ==
The present location of the hotspot is disputed. Hartnady & le Roex 1985 proposed a location below a small seamount, the "Shona Seamount" (54.5°S 6.0°W), just west of the Mid-Atlantic Ridge. This location was used by O'Connor & Duncan 1990. Morgan & Morgan 2007 however proposed 51.4°S 1.0°E, the eastern end of the Shona Rise/Shona Ridge. O'Connor et al. 2012 simply located the hotspot at 56.1°S 1.0°E where its volcanic trail begin.

== Discovery ==
The hotspot was first proposed by Hartnady & le Roex 1985. They noted that the Meteor Rise and Cape Rise seamount chain (west of South Africa) could not be associated with the Bouvet hotspot and therefore predicted the existence of another hotspot near the southern end of the Mid-Atlantic Ridge. Hartnady and le Roex explained the peculiar zig-zag pattern of this seamount chain as the result of the hotspot crossing the Agulhas Falkland fracture zone (AFFZ, a system of ridges stretching across the South Atlantic; the Mid-Atlantic Ridge makes a 'jump' just south of the AFFZ). The tracks of the Bouvet and Shona hotspots probably passed under the Agulhas Ridge (eastern part of the AFFZ) during the Mesozoic 80 to 69 Ma and supplied the ridge with excess material.

== Plume–Mid-ocean ridge interaction ==
Between 51°S and 52°S the mid-ocean ridge basalts (MORBs) of the Mid-Atlantic Ridge have a composition that is associated with hotspots. Based on anomalously high Nb/Zr ratios in the southern end of the ridge, le Roex in 1987 suggested that the plume interacts with the ridge. Furthermore, inflated bathymetry and gravity coupled with increase in (La/Sm)_{n} ratios (ratio of light rare-earth elements in MORBs) are indications that the plume is interacting with the ridge. le Roex et al. 2010 analysed lavas dredged from the Shona Ridge System, the hotspot track formed by the Shona Rise, Meteor Rise, Agulhas Ridge, and Cape Rise, and concluded that those lavas are geochemically enriched compared to the MORBs, an indication that the Mid-Atlantic Ridge is interacting with a plume.
