= Robuloidoidea =

Robuloidoidea Temporal range: Late Silurian - Early Cretaceous

Scientific classification
- Domain: Eukaryota
- Clade: Sar
- Clade: Rhizaria
- Phylum: Retaria
- Subphylum: Foraminifera
- Order: Lagenida
- Superfamily: Robuloidoidea; Reiss, 1963

Families
- Robuloididae; Ichthyolariidae; Partisaniidae; Syzraniidae

Synonyms
- Robuloidacea

Superfamily of amoeboid protists

Robuloidoidea is a superfamily included in the Protista order Lagenida in which the test wall is either not secondarily lamellar or is only slightly so, as in later taxa.

The Robuloidoidea superfamily was named by Frederick Reiss in 1963. It ranges stratigraphically from the Upper Silurian to the end of the Lower Cretaceous (Albian). Four families are recognized. They are the Middle Permian Robuloididae, Lower to Upper Permian Partisaniidae, Lower Permian to Lower Cretaceous Ichthyolariidae and the Upper Silurian to Upper Permian Syzraniidae. Some of the genera included in the Robuloidoidea were previously included in the Fusulinida (Parathuramminoidea and Endothyroidea) while others were found in the Nodosariidae, Nodosarioidea.
