= Newmarracarra Limestone =

Geologic formation in Australia

- Stratigraphic range: Middle Jurassic (Bajocian) 170.9–168.2 Ma
- Type: Geological formation
- Unit of: Champion Bay Group
- Underlies: Kojarena Sandstone, Yarragadee Formation
- Overlies: Colalura Sandstone, Bringo Shale
- Thickness: 11.5–14.3 m (38–47 ft)

Lithology
- Primary: Limestone
- Other: Sandstone

Location
- Location: Geraldton, Western Australia
- Coordinates: 28.733°S 114.8°E (Type section Round Hill)
- Region: Western Australia
- Country: Australia
- Extent: Perth Basin
- Newmarracarra Limestone (Australia) Newmarracarra Limestone (Western Australia)

The Newmarracarra Limestone is a Bajocian geologic formation, in Western Australia. It is one of the very small number of marine Jurassic rocks with exposed surfaces in Australia, and its strata were laid during a brief marine incursion into the northern area of the Perth Basin during the middle Bajocian of the Middle Jurassic. It is named after the "Newmarracarra" historic property.

== Geology ==
Extending from Mount Hill to Howatharra, and as far to the east as the Wicherina area, the Newmarracarra Limestone is a unit of the Champion Bay Group, and comformably lies between the overlying Kojarena Sandstone (Bajocian) or the Yarragadee Formation (Late Jurassic–Early Cretaceous, and the underlying Colalura Sandstone or the Bringo Shale. The type section is located at Round Hill, in the Bringo-Moonyoonooka area where the best outcrops are located.

The Newmarracarra Limestone consists of yellow grey sandy or clayey limestone, which occasionally grades into calcareous sandstone, and shows extensive signs of erosion in some areas. The formation is sandy, described as "hard, massive and crudely bedded" in places unaffected by laterization. The thickest exposed section, on "Moonyoonooka" property, is about 11.5 metres (38 ft), but at the Geraldton racecourse bore, it reaches up to 14.3 metres (47 ft).

== Paleobiota ==
The Newmarracarra Limestone hosts the most well-preserved paleobiota of the Perth Basin, including ammonites, annelids, belemnites, bivalves, bryozoans, foraminifers, gastropods, and ostracods. A single nautiloid and echinoid each are also documented from the formation's rocks.

=== Ammonitida ===
Ammonites of the Newmarracarra Limestone
Genus	Species	Clade	Image
Fontannesia	F. clarkei	Ammonitina, Sonniniidae	
Fontannesia	F. fairbridgei	Ammonitina, Sonniniidae	
Fontannesia	F. whitehousi	Ammonitina, Sonniniidae	
Fontannesia	F. n. sp. indet.	Ammonitina, Sonniniidae	
Newmarracarroceras	N. clarkei	Ammonitina, Sonniniidae	
Otoites	O. antipodus	Ammonitina, Sphaeroceratidae	
Otoites	O.? australis	Ammonitina, Sphaeroceratidae	
Otoites	O. (Trilobiticeras?) depressus	Ammonitina, Sphaeroceratidae	
Otoites	O. woodwardi	Ammonitina, Sphaeroceratidae	
Pseudotoites	P. brunnschweileri	Ammonitina, Sphaeroceratidae	
Pseudotoites	P. championensis	Ammonitina, Sphaeroceratidae	
Pseudotoites	P. emilioides	Ammonitina, Sphaeroceratidae	
Pseudotoites	P. fasciculatus	Ammonitina, Sphaeroceratidae	
Pseudotoites	P. leicherti	Ammonitina, Sphaeroceratidae	
Pseudotoites	P. robiginosus	Ammonitina, Sphaeroceratidae	
Pseudotoites	P. semiornatus	Ammonitina, Sphaeroceratidae	
Pseudotoites	P. spitiformis	Ammonitina, Sphaeroceratidae	
Sonninia	S. playfordi	Ammonitina, Sonniniidae	
Stemmatoceras	S. sp. cf. S. subcoronatum	Ammonitina,Stephanoceratidae	
Stemmatoceras	S. sp. aff. S. triptolemus	Ammonitina,Stephanoceratidae	
Witchellia	W. australica	Ammonitina, Graphoceratidae	
Zemistephanus	Z. armatus	Ammonitina, Stephanoceratidae	
Zemistephanus	Z. corona	Ammonitina, Stephanoceratidae	

=== Bivalvia ===
Bivalves of the Newmarracarra Limestone
Genus	Species	Clade	Image
Amphidonta	A. tholiformis	Ostreida, Ostreidae	
Amphidonta	A. sp. cf. A. tholiformis	Ostreida, Ostreidae	
Arca	A. sp.	Arcida, Arcidae	
Astarte	A. (A.) apicalis	Carditida, Astartidae	
Astarte	A. (A.) cliftoni	Carditida, Astartidae	
Astarte	A. (A.) tibbraddeni	Carditida, Astartidae	
Avicula	A. inaequalis	Ostreida, Pteriidae	
Camptonectes	C. greenoughi	Pectinida, Pectinidae	
Camptonectes	"C." waggrakinensis	Pectinida, Pectinidae	
Cardium	C. sp.	Cardiida, Cardiidae	
Chlamys	C. enantyi	Pectinida, Pectinidae	
Ctenostreon	C. pectiniformis	Ostreida, Ctenostreidae	
Cucullaea	C. geraldtoni	Arcida, Cucullaeidae	
Cucullaea	C. inflata	Arcida, Cucullaeidae	
Cucullaea	C. semistriata	Arcida, Cucullaeidae	
Cypricardia	C. sp.	incertae sedis	
Gresslya	G.? sanfordii	Pholadomyida, Gresslyidae	
Gresslya	G. donaciformis	Pholadomyida, Gresslyidae	
Gryphaea	G. sp. indet.	Ostreida, Gryphaeidae	
Hinnites	H. sp.	Pectinida, Pectinidae	
Isocardia	I. sp.	Venerida, Glossidae	
Isognomon	I. (I.) sp. indet.	Ostreida, Isognomonidae	
Lima	L. punctata	Limida, Limidae	
Lopha	L. marshii australiensis	Ostreida, Ostreidae	
Lopha	L. marshii newmarracarrensis	Ostreida, Ostreidae	
Lucina	L. sp.	Lucinida, Lucinidae	
Martesia	M. (Particoma) australis	Myida, Pholadidae	
Meleagrinella	M. sinuata	Ostreida, Oxytomidae	
Modiolus	M. (M.) maitlandi	Mytilida, Mytilidae	
Myacites	M. liasianus	Pholadomyida, incertae sedis	
Mytilus	M. sp. cf. M. gygerensis	Mytilida, Mytilidae	
Mytilus	M. sp.	Mytilida, Mytilidae	
Opis	O. sp.	incertae sedis	
Oxytoma	O. (O.) decemcostata	Ostreida, Oxytomidae	
Panopea	P. rugosa	Myida, Hiatellidae	
Panopea	P. sp.	Myida, Hiatellidae	
Parvamussium	P.? geelvinki	Pectinida, Propeamussiidae	
Pecten	P. calvus	Pectinida, Pectinidae	
Pecten	P. sp. cf. P. frontalis	Pectinida, Pectinidae	
Pecten	P. greenoughensis	Pectinida, Pectinidae	
Pecten	P. valoniensis	Pectinida, Pectinidae	
Pecten	P. spp.	Pectinida, Pectinidae	
Perna	P. sp.	Ostreida, incertae sedis	
Pholadomya	P. ovalum	Pholadomyida, Pholadomyidae	
Plagiostoma	P. championi	Limida, Limidae	
Plicatula	P. sp.	Pectinida, Plicatulidae	
Pseudolimea	P. duplicata	Limida, Limidae	
Tancredia	T. (T.) sandspringi	Cardiida, Tancrediidae	
Tancredia	T. sp.	Cardiida, Tancrediidae	
Trigonia	T. moorei	Trigoniida, Trigoniidae	
Unicardium	U. sp.	incertae sedis	
Nuculidae indet.	nuculid indet.	Nuculida, Nuculidae	
Parallelodontidae indet.	Parallelodontidae spp.	Arcida, Parallelodontidae	

=== Brachiopoda ===
Brachiopods of the Newmarracarra Limestone
Genus	Species	Clade	Image
Cirpa	C. fromontae	Rhynchonellida, Wellerellidae	
Rhynchonella	R. variabilis	Rhynchonellida, Rhynchonellidae	
Rhynchonella	R. spp.	Rhynchonellida, Rhynchonellidae	

=== Belemnitida ===
Belemnitids of the Newmarracarra Limestone
Genus	Species	Clade	Image
Belemnites	B. canaliculatus	Belemnitida, Belemnitidae	
Belemnites	B. canhami	Belemnitida, Belemnitidae	
Belemnopsis	B. sp.	Belemnitida, Belemnopseidae	

=== Foraminifera ===
Foraminiferans of the Newmarracarra Limestone
Genus	Species	Clade	Image
Bulimina	B. gregorii	Buliminida, Buliminidae	
Cristellaria	C. costata var. compressa	Lagenida, Lenticulinidae	
Cristellaria	C. costata var. seminuda	Lagenida, Lenticulinidae	
Cristellaria	C. cultrata	Lagenida, Lenticulinidae	
Cristellaria	C. daintreei	Lagenida, Lenticulinidae	
Cristellaria	C. decipiens	Lagenida, Lenticulinidae	
Cristellaria	C. sp. cf. C. limata	Lagenida, Lenticulinidae	
Cristellaria	C. prominula	Lagenida, Lenticulinidae	
Cristellaria	C. rotulata	Lagenida, Lenticulinidae	
Cristellaria	C. subulata	Lagenida, Lenticulinidae	
Discorbina	D. rosacea	Rotaliida, Discorbidae	
Flabellina	F. dilatata	Lagenida, Vaginulinidae	
Haplophragmium	H. neocomianum	Lituolida, incertae sedis	
Marginulina	M. compressa	Lagenida, Vaginulinidae	
Marginulina	M. solida	Lagenida, Vaginulinidae	
Polymorphina	P. burdigalensis	Lagenida, Polymorphinidae	
Polymorphina	P. compressa	Lagenida, Polymorphinidae	
Polymorphina	P. gutta	Lagenida, Polymorphinidae	
Textularia	T. crater	Textulariida, Textulariidae	
Truncatulina	T. wuellerstorfi	Rotaliida, Cibicididae	
Vaginulina	V. intumescens	Lagenida, Vaginulinidae	
Vaginulina	V. lata	Lagenida, Vaginulinidae	
Vaginulina	V. schloenbachi var. interrupta	Lagenida, Vaginulinidae	
Vaginulina	V. strigillata	Lagenida, Vaginulinidae	

=== Gastropoda ===
Gastropods of the Newmarracarra Limestone
Genus	Species	Clade	Image
Amberleya	A. sp.	Trochida, Amberleyidae	
Cerithium	C. greenoughensis	Caenogastropoda, Cerithiidae	
Cerithium	C. sp.	Caenogastropoda, Cerithiidae	
Chemnitzia	C. sp.	incertae sedis	
Nerinea	N. sp.	Nerineoidea, Nerineidae	
Phasianella	P. sp.	Trochida, Phasianellidae	
Pleurotomaria	P. greenoughensis	Pleurotomariida, Pleurotomariidae	
Pleurotomaria	P. sp.	Pleurotomariida, Pleurotomariidae	
Rissoina	R. australis	Littorinimorpha, Rissoinidae	
Trochus	T. sp.	Trochida, Trochidae	
Turbo	T. australis	Trochida, Turbinidae	
Turbo	T. laevigatus	Trochida, Turbinidae	
Turbo	T. sp.	Trochida, Turbinidae	

=== Ostracoda ===
Ostracods of the Newmarracarra Limestone
Genus	Species	Clade	Image
Cythere	"C." lobulata	Podocopida, Cytheridae	
Cytheropteron	"C." australiense	Podocopida, Cytheruridae	
Loxoconcha	"L." elongata	Podocopida, Loxoconchidae	
Loxoconcha	"L." jurassica	Podocopida, Loxoconchidae	
Paradoxorhyncha	P. foveolata	Podocopida, ncertae sedis	
Procytheridea	P. fortior	Podocopida, Progonocytheridae	

=== Other ===
Other fauna of the Newmarracarra Limestone
Genus	Species	Clade	Image
Berenicea	B. sp. cf. B. archiaci	Cyclostomatida, incertae sedis	
Cidaris	C. sp.	Cidaroida, Cidaridae	
Dentalium	D. sp.	Dentaliida, Dentaliidae	
Nautilus	N. peronatus	Nautilida, Nautilidae	
Serpula	S. conformis	Sabellida, Serpulidae	
Serpula	S. spp.	Sabellida, Serpulidae	
