= Capitanian mass extinction event =

Extinction event around 260 million years ago

Plot of extinction intensity (percentage of genera that are present in each interval of time but do not exist in the following interval) vs. time in the past for marine genera. Geological periods are annotated (by abbreviation and colour) above. The Capitanian extinction event occurred 260–259 million years ago, ~7 million years before the Permian–Triassic extinction event, with just over 35% (according to this source) failing to survive.
Source and image info.

The Capitanian mass extinction event (Note: Also known as the end-Guadalupian, Guadalupian–Lopingian, or pre-Lopingian extinction.) was a mass extinction that marked the end of the Capitanian stage and Guadalupian (Middle Permian) epoch of the Permian. Historically conflated with the better-known Permian–Triassic extinction, it was only recognised as a distinct event in 1994. The Capitanian mass extinction resulted in the extinction of 33–35% of marine genera and 60–63% of marine species, although a recent analysis suggested significantly lower loss of marine life. It is considered to be less severe than the Late Triassic, Late Cretaceous, Late Ordovician, and end-Permian mass extinctions, and is considered to be the fifth worst extinction in terms of ecological severity within marine ecosystems. Within the terrestrial ecosystems, it wiped out 31% of tetrapod genera and 38% species. Tetrapods that went during the extinction event included dinocephalians, varanopids, basal therocephalians, bolosaurids, and Gondwanan basal anomodonts. Recent analysis suggests the extinction may have had two phases with the initial phase 260.6 Ma and the second phase starting 259.9 Ma, with each phase lasting 300,000 years.

Most experts believe the cause of the extinction event was volcanism from the Emeishan Traps, which resulted in released high levels of carbon dioxide and sulphur dioxide, and mercury. The volcanism an increase in global temperatures which caused anoxia and euxinia, ocean acidification, and possibly the reduction of the ozone layer. Other contributing factors from the volcanism include acid rain, toxicity, short term cooling, volcanic induced darkness, and reduced photosynthesis.

The global nature of the Capitanian mass extinction has been called into question by some experts, finding it to have affected only low-latitude taxa in the Northern Hemisphere.

== Magnitude ==
In the aftermath of Olson's Extinction, global diversity rose during the Capitanian. This was probably the result of disaster taxa replacing extinct guilds. The Capitanian mass extinction greatly reduced disparity (the range of different guilds); eight guilds were lost. It impacted the diversity within individual communities more severely than the Permian–Triassic extinction event. Although faunas began recovery immediately after the Capitanian extinction event, rebuilding complex trophic structures and refilling guilds, diversity and disparity fell further until the Permian–Triassic boundary.

=== Marine ecosystems ===
The impact of the Capitanian extinction event on marine ecosystems is still heavily debated by palaeontologists. Stanley and Yang (1994) estimated loss of marine invertebrates during the Capitanian mass extinction was comparable in magnitude to the Cretaceous–Paleogene extinction event. Sepkoski (1996) and Bambach et al. (2004), which were based on Sepkoski Large Data Base (SLDB) compilation, indicated a loss of marine invertebrate genera of 47% and 36% respectively. Both papers recovered the Capitanian mass extinction as the third worst extinction in magnitude. McGhee Jr. et al. (2013) re-calculated the number of genera loss in terms of extinction probability using Paleobiology Database (PBDB), and estimated 25% of marine genera were loss. They considered the Capitanian extinction to be the ninth worst in terms of taxonomic severity (number of genera lost), but found it to be the fifth worst with regard to its ecological impact (i.e., the degree of taxonomic restructuring within ecosystems or the loss of ecological niches or even entire ecosystems themselves). Stanley (2016) suggested a loss of 33–35% of genera when corrected for background extinction, the Signor–Lipps effect and clustering of extinctions in certain taxa. Kaiho (2022) found marine loss within the Capitanian mass extinction to be significantly lower than previous studies, losing 18% of genera and 11% of species.

=== Terrestrial ecosystems ===
Few published estimates for the impact on terrestrial ecosystems exist for the Capitanian mass extinction. Among vertebrates, Day et al. (2015) suggested a 74–80% loss of generic richness in tetrapods of the Karoo Basin in South Africa, including the extinction of the dinocephalians. In land plants, Stevens and colleagues found an extinction of 56% of plant species recorded in the mid-Upper Shihhotse Formation in North China, which was approximately mid-Capitanian in age. 24% of plant species in South China went extinct. Kaiho (2022) estimated the 31% and 38% of tetrapod genera and species went extinct. He suggested low number of extinctions within marine ecosystems and high numbers of extinctions in terrestrial ecosystems would suggest the Capitanian mass extinction major terrestrial crisis instead of a mass extinction.

== Timing ==
Although it is known that the Capitanian mass extinction occurred after Olson's Extinction and before the Permian–Triassic extinction event, the exact age of the Capitanian mass extinction remains controversial. Part of the reason for this is the poorly resolved biostratigraphy of the Guadalupian-Lopingian boundary interval. It is also partly due to the somewhat circumstantial age of the Capitanian–Wuchiapingian boundary itself, which is currently estimated to be approximately 259.1 million years old, but is subject to change by the Subcommission on Permian Stratigraphy of the International Commission on Stratigraphy.

Additionally, there is a dispute regarding the severity of the extinction and whether the extinction in China happened at the same time as the extinction in Spitsbergen. According to one study, the Capitanian mass extinction was not one discrete event but a continuous decline in diversity that began at the end of the Wordian. Another study examining fossiliferous facies in Svalbard found no evidence for a sudden mass extinction, instead attributing local biotic changes during the Capitanian to the southward migration of many taxa through the Zechstein Sea. Carbonate platform deposits in Hungary and Hydra show no sign of an extinction event at the end of the Capitanian; the extinction event there is recorded in the middle Capitanian.

The volcanics of the Emeishan Traps, which are interbedded with tropical carbonate platforms of the Maokou Formation, are unique for preserving a mass extinction and the cause of that mass extinction. Large phreatomagmatic eruptions occurred when the Emeishan Traps first started to erupt, leading to the extinction of fusulinacean foraminifera and calcareous algae.

Historically, the age of the extinction horizon has been estimated to around 260–262 Ma in the absence of direct radiometric ages in marine sections; this fits broadly with radiometric ages from the terrestrial realm, assuming the two events are contemporaneous. Plant losses occurred either at the same time as the marine extinction or after it. A 2026 study published U-Pb constraints on an extinction horizon in South China, using ash beds from marine sections near the Emeishan Traps. These ash beds set the end of the Guadalupian at 259.857 ± 0.084 Ma. This places the boundary at the start of the second major pulse of volcanic activity.

=== Marine realm ===
The extinction of fusulinacean foraminifera in Southwest China was originally dated to the end of the Guadalupian, but studies published in 2009 and 2010 dated the extinction of these fusulinaceans to the mid-Capitanian. Brachiopod and coral losses occurred in the middle of the Capitanian stage. The extinction suffered by the ammonoids may have occurred in the early Wuchiapingian.

=== Terrestrial realm ===
The existence of change in tetrapod faunas in the mid-Permian has long been known in South Africa and Russia. In Russia, it corresponded to the boundary between what became known as the Titanophoneus Superzone and the Scutosaurus Superzone and later the Dinocephalian Superassemblage and the Theriodontian Superassemblage, respectively. In South Africa, this corresponded to the boundary between the variously named Pareiasaurus, Dinocephalian or Tapinocephalus Assemblage Zone and the overlying assemblages. In both Russia and South Africa, this transition was associated with the extinction of the previously dominant group of therapsid amniotes, the dinocephalians, which led to its later designation as the dinocephalian extinction. Post-extinction origination rates remained low through the Pristerognathus Assemblage Zone for at least 1 million years, which suggests that there was a delayed recovery of Karoo Basin ecosystems.

After the recognition of a separate marine mass extinction at the end of the Guadalupian, the dinocephalian extinction was seen to represent its terrestrial correlate. Though it was subsequently suggested that because the Russian Ischeevo fauna, which was considered the youngest dinocephalian fauna in that region, was constrained to below the Illawarra magnetic reversal and therefore had to have occurred in the Wordian stage, well before the end of the Guadalupian, this constraint applied to the type locality only. The recognition of a younger dinocephalian fauna in Russia (the Sundyr Tetrapod Assemblage) and the retrieval of biostratigraphically well-constrained radiometric ages via uranium–lead dating of a tuff from the Tapinocephalus Assemblage Zone of the Karoo Basin demonstrated that the dinocephalian extinction did occur in the late Capitanian, around 260 million years ago.

== Effects on life ==
=== Marine life ===
In the oceans, the Capitanian extinction event led to high extinction rates among ammonoids, corals and calcareous algal reef-building organisms, foraminifera, bryozoans, and brachiopods. It was more severe in restricted marine basins than in the open oceans. It appears to have been particularly selective against shallow-water taxa that relied on photosynthesis or a photosymbiotic relationship; many species with poorly buffered respiratory physiologies also became extinct. The extinction event led to a collapse of the reef carbonate factory in the shallow seas surrounding South China.

The ammonoids, which had been in a long-term decline for a 30 million year period since the Roadian, suffered a selective extinction pulse at the end of the Capitanian. 75.6% of coral families, 77.8% of coral genera and 82.2% of coral species that were in Permian China were lost during the Capitanian mass extinction.

Among bivalve losses, perhaps most prominent were the giant alatoconchids, which occurred abundantly in the shallow seas around South China before the mass extinction event but failed to survive it.

Among foraminifera, the extinction event exhibited a strong size-dependent selectivity; large foraminifera suffered especially heavily during the crisis. The Verbeekinidae, a family of large fusuline foraminifera, went extinct. Morphologically complex miliolids also suffered major losses.

87% of brachiopod species found at the Kapp Starostin Formation on Spitsbergen disappeared over a period of tens of thousands of years; though new brachiopod and bivalve species emerged after the extinction, the dominant position of the brachiopods was taken over by the bivalves. Approximately 70% of other species found at the Kapp Starostin Formation also vanished. The fossil record of East Greenland is similar to that of Spitsbergen; the faunal losses in Canada's Sverdrup Basin are comparable to the extinctions in Spitsbergen and East Greenland, but the post-extinction recovery that happened in Spitsbergen and East Greenland did not occur in the Sverdrup Basin. Whereas rhynchonelliform brachiopods made up 99.1% of the individuals found in tropical carbonates in the Western United States, South China and Greece prior to the extinction, molluscs made up 61.2% of the individuals found in similar environments after the extinction. 87% of brachiopod species and 82% of fusulinacean foraminifer species in South China were lost. Although severe for brachiopods, the Capitanian extinction's impact on their diversity was nowhere near as strong as that of the later end-Permian extinction.

The effects of the extinction event on marine vertebrates is enigmatic. There is no evidence of a diversity decline among bony fish, although a pronounced increase in body mass is documented among 'palaeopterygians' across the Guadalupian-Lopingian boundary.

Biomarker evidence indicates red algae and photoautotrophic bacteria dominated marine microbial communities. Significant turnovers in microbial ecosystems occurred during the Capitanian mass extinction, though they were smaller in magnitude than those associated with the end-Permian extinction.

Most of the marine victims of the extinction were either endemic species of epicontinental seas around Pangaea that died when the seas closed, or were dominant species of the Paleotethys Ocean. Evidence from marine deposits in Japan and Primorye suggests that mid-latitude marine life became affected earlier by the extinction event than marine organisms of the tropics.

Whether and to what degree latitude affected the likelihood of taxa to go extinct remains disputed amongst palaeontologists. Whereas some studies conclude that the extinction event was a regional one limited to tropical areas, others suggest that there was little latitudinal variation in extinction patterns. A study examining foraminiferal extinctions in particular found that the Central and Western Palaeotethys experienced taxonomic losses of a lower magnitude than the Northern and Eastern Palaeotethys, which had the highest extinction magnitude. The same study found that Panthalassa's overall extinction magnitude was similar to that of the Central and Western Palaeotethys, but that it had a high magnitude of extinction of endemic taxa.

This mass extinction marked the beginning of the transition between the Palaeozoic and Modern evolutionary faunas. The brachiopod-mollusc transition that characterised the broader shift from the Palaeozoic to Modern evolutionary faunas has been suggested to have had its roots in the Capitanian mass extinction event, although other research has concluded that this may be an illusion created by taphonomic bias in silicified fossil assemblages, with the transition beginning only in the aftermath of the more cataclysmic end-Permian extinction. After the Capitanian mass extinction, disaster taxa such as Earlandia and Diplosphaerina became abundant in what is now South China. The initial recovery of reefs consisted of non-metazoan reefs: algal bioherms and algal-sponge reef buildups. This initial recovery interval was followed by an interval of Tubiphytes-dominated reefs, which in turn was followed by a return of metazoan, sponge-dominated reefs. Overall, reef recovery took approximately 2.5 million years.

=== Terrestrial life ===
Terrestrial ecosystems during the leadup to the extinction had relatively high predator to prey ratios, making terrestrial food webs vulnerable to collapse and the extinction strongly felt. Among terrestrial vertebrates, the main victims were dinocephalian therapsids, which were one of the most common elements of tetrapod fauna of the Guadalupian. Other victims of the mass extinction included varanopids, a clade whose latest surviving taxa perished at the end of the Capitanian. The bolosaurid parareptiles also were completely wiped out. The terrestrial biota of the Karoo after this extinction exhibited very low diversity, with species richness remaining low for up to 3 million years after the main pulse of the mass extinction. The diversity of the anomodonts that lived during the late Guadalupian was cut in half by the Capitanian mass extinction, with Gondwanan basal anomodonts going extinct entirely. Terrestrial survivors of the Capitanian extinction event were generally 20 kg (44 lb) to 50 kg (110 lb) and commonly found in burrows. Therocephalians briefly occupied apex predatory niches before gorgonopsians radiated to fill them. Eutherocephalians radiated very rapidly after the extinction event and increased in both disparity and diversity, filling niches left vacant by scylacosaurids and lycosuchids.

== Causes ==
=== Emeishan Traps ===
==== Volcanic emissions ====
It is believed that the extinction, which coincided with the beginning of a major negative δ^{13}C excursion signifying a severe disturbance of the carbon cycle, was triggered by eruptions of the Emeishan Traps large igneous province, basalt piles from which currently cover an area of 250,000 to 500,000 km^{2}, although the original volume of the basalts may have been anywhere from 500,000 km^{3} to over 1,000,000 km^{3}. The age of the extinction event and the deposition of the Emeishan basalts are in good alignment. Reefs and other marine sediments interbedded among basalt piles indicate Emeishan volcanism initially developed underwater; terrestrial outflows of lava occurred only later in the large igneous province's period of activity. These eruptions would have released high doses of toxic mercury; increased mercury concentrations are coincident with the negative carbon isotope excursion, indicating a common volcanic cause. Coronene enrichment at the Guadalupian-Lopingian boundary further confirms the existence of massive volcanic activity; coronene can only form at extremely high temperatures created either by extraterrestrial impacts or massive volcanism, with the former being ruled out because of an absence of iridium anomalies coeval with mercury and coronene anomalies.

A large amount of carbon dioxide and sulphur dioxide is believed to have been discharged into the stratosphere of the Northern and Southern Hemispheres due to the equatorial location of the Emeishan Traps, leading to sudden global cooling and long-term global warming. The Emeishan Traps discharged between 130 and 188 teratonnes of carbon dioxide in total, doing so at a rate of between 0.08 and 0.25 gigatonnes of carbon dioxide per year, making them responsible for an increase in atmospheric carbon dioxide that was both one of the largest and one of the most precipitous in the entire geological history of the Earth. Another estimate placed yearly carbon dioxide emissions at .020–.030 gigatonnes per year.

The rate of carbon dioxide emissions during the Capitanian mass extinction, though extremely abrupt, was nonetheless significantly slower than that during the end-Permian extinction, during which carbon dioxide levels rose five times faster according to one study. Warming during Emeishan eruptions is estimated at 2.3 °C in the first eruption pulse and 1.3 °C in the second eruption pulse. This degree of warming is relatively mild compared to most mass extinctions, as a result of the more drawn-out nature of the eruptions. The Emeishan Traps erupted over the course of two pulses, each lasting about 300,000 years.

Significant quantities of methane released by dikes and sills intruding into coal-rich deposits has been implicated as an additional driver of warming, though this idea has been challenged by studies that instead conclude that the extinction was precipitated directly by the Emeishan Traps or by their interaction with platform carbonates. The emissions of the Emeishan Traps may also have contributed to the downfall of the ozone shield, exposing the Earth's surface to a vastly increased flux of high-frequency solar radiation.

The Emeishan Traps were not the only source of volcanic discharges of climate-altering gases; Hg/TOC and Δ^{199}Hg values from strata that were part of the Yangtze Platform indicate that continental arc volcanism also contributed a significant share of emissions and helped cause the biotic crisis.

==== Anoxia and euxinia ====
Global warming resulting from the large igneous province's activity has been implicated as a cause of marine anoxia (oxygen depletion). Emeishan volcanic activity led to two anoxic events, the middle Capitanian OAE-C1 and the end-Capitanian OAE-C2. Volcanic greenhouse gas release and global warming increased continental weathering and mineral erosion, which in turn has been propounded as a factor enhancing oceanic euxinia (excessive hydrogen sulfide alongside oxygen depletion). Euxinia may have been exacerbated even further by the increasing sluggishness of ocean circulation resulting from volcanically driven warming. The initial hydrothermal nature of the Emeishan Traps meant that local marine life around South China would have been especially jeopardised by anoxia due to hyaloclastite development in restricted, fault-bounded basins. Expansion of oceanic anoxia has been posited to have occurred slightly before the Capitanian extinction event itself by some studies, though it is probable that upwelling of anoxic waters prior to the mass extinction was a local phenomenon specific to South China.

==== Hypercapnia and acidification ====
Because the ocean acts as a carbon sink absorbing atmospheric carbon dioxide, it is likely that the excessive volcanic emissions of carbon dioxide resulted in marine hypercapnia (excessive dissolved carbon dioxide). This would have acted in conjunction with other killing mechanisms to further increase the severity of the biotic crisis.

The dissolution of volcanically emitted carbon dioxide in the oceans triggered ocean acidification, which probably contributed to the demise of various calcareous marine organisms, particularly giant alatoconchid bivalves. By virtue of the greater solubility of carbon dioxide in colder waters, ocean acidification was especially lethal in high latitude waters.

Furthermore, acid rain would have arisen as yet another biocidal consequence of the intense sulphur emissions produced by Emeishan Traps volcanism. This resulted in soil acidification and a decline of terrestrial infaunal invertebrates. Some researchers have cast doubt on whether significant acidification took place globally, concluding that the carbon cycle perturbation was too small to have caused a major worldwide drop in pH. By one estimate, global marine pH dropped by 0.1-0.2 per 300,000 years, about 15 to 35 slower than the pH crisis at the end of the Permian.

==== Criticism of the volcanic cause hypothesis ====
Not all studies, however, have supported the volcanic warming hypothesis; analysis of δ^{13}C and δ^{18}O values from the tooth apatite of Diictodon feliceps specimens from the Karoo Supergroup shows a positive δ^{13}C excursion and concludes that the end of the Capitanian was marked by massive aridification in the region, although the temperature remained largely the same, suggesting that global climate change did not account for the extinction event. Analysis of vertebrate extinction rates in the Karoo Basin, specifically the upper Abrahamskraal Formation and lower Teekloof Formation, show that the large scale decrease in terrestrial vertebrate diversity coincided with volcanism in the Emeishan Traps, although robust evidence for a causal relationship between these two events remains elusive. A 2015 study called into question whether the Capitanian mass extinction event was global in nature at all or merely a regional biotic crisis limited to South China and a few other areas, finding no evidence for terrestrial or marine extinctions in eastern Australia linked to the Emeishan Traps or to any proposed extinction triggers invoked to explain the biodiversity drop in low-latitudes of the Northern Hemisphere.

=== Marine regression ===
The Capitanian mass extinction has been attributed to sea level fall, with the widespread demise of reefs in particular being linked to this marine regression. The Guadalupian-Lopingian boundary coincided with one of the most prominent first-order marine regressions of the Phanerozoic. Evidence for abrupt sea level fall at the terminus of the Guadalupian comes from evaporites and terrestrial facies overlying marine carbonate deposits across the Guadalupian-Lopingian transition. Additionally, a tremendous unconformity is associated with the Guadalupian-Lopingian boundary in many strata across the world. The closure of the Sino-Mongolian Seaway at the end of the Capitanian has been invoked as a potential driver of Palaeotethyan biodiversity loss. However, analysis by Wu and colleagues questioned the role of marine regressions as intervals dominated solely by marine regressions showed an increase biodiversity in South China during the latest Capitanian.

=== Other hypotheses ===
Global drying, plate tectonics, and biological competition may have also played a role in the extinction. Potential drivers of extinction proposed as causes of end-Guadalupian reef decline include fluctuations in salinity and tectonic collisions of microcontinents.

== See also ==
- Olson's Extinction
- Permian–Triassic extinction event
