= Triticites =

Triticites Temporal range: Moscovian–Capitanian

Scientific classification
- Domain: Eukaryota
- Clade: Sar
- Clade: Rhizaria
- Phylum: Retaria
- Subphylum: Foraminifera
- Class: Globothalamea (?)
- Order: †Fusulinida
- Family: †Schwagerinidae
- Genus: †Triticites; Girty, 1904

Type species
- Miliolites secalicus Say, 1823

Genus of foraminifera

Triticites ("grain of wheat") is a genus of foraminiferan in the family Schwangerinidae. More than four hundred species have been identified.

== Description ==
Triticites shells are fusiform to elongate fusiform in shape, with poles that are pointed sharply to bluntly. The shell wall consists of a tectum between 5–8 microns thick and keriotheca of varying thickness. In basal species, the alveoli are thin-walled and indistinct. The septa are always irregular and blister-like at the poles, with septal pores that are often conspicuous in the outer volutions. In more basal species, septal fluting is only developed near the polar regions, but in more derived ones it extends, to varying degrees, from the axial to polar regions. The chromata are small.

== Taxonomy ==
Triticites belongs to the family Schwagerinidae, part of the order Fusulinida. It can be distinguished from the related Schwagerina by its chomata, which are more conspicuous than in Schwagerina.
