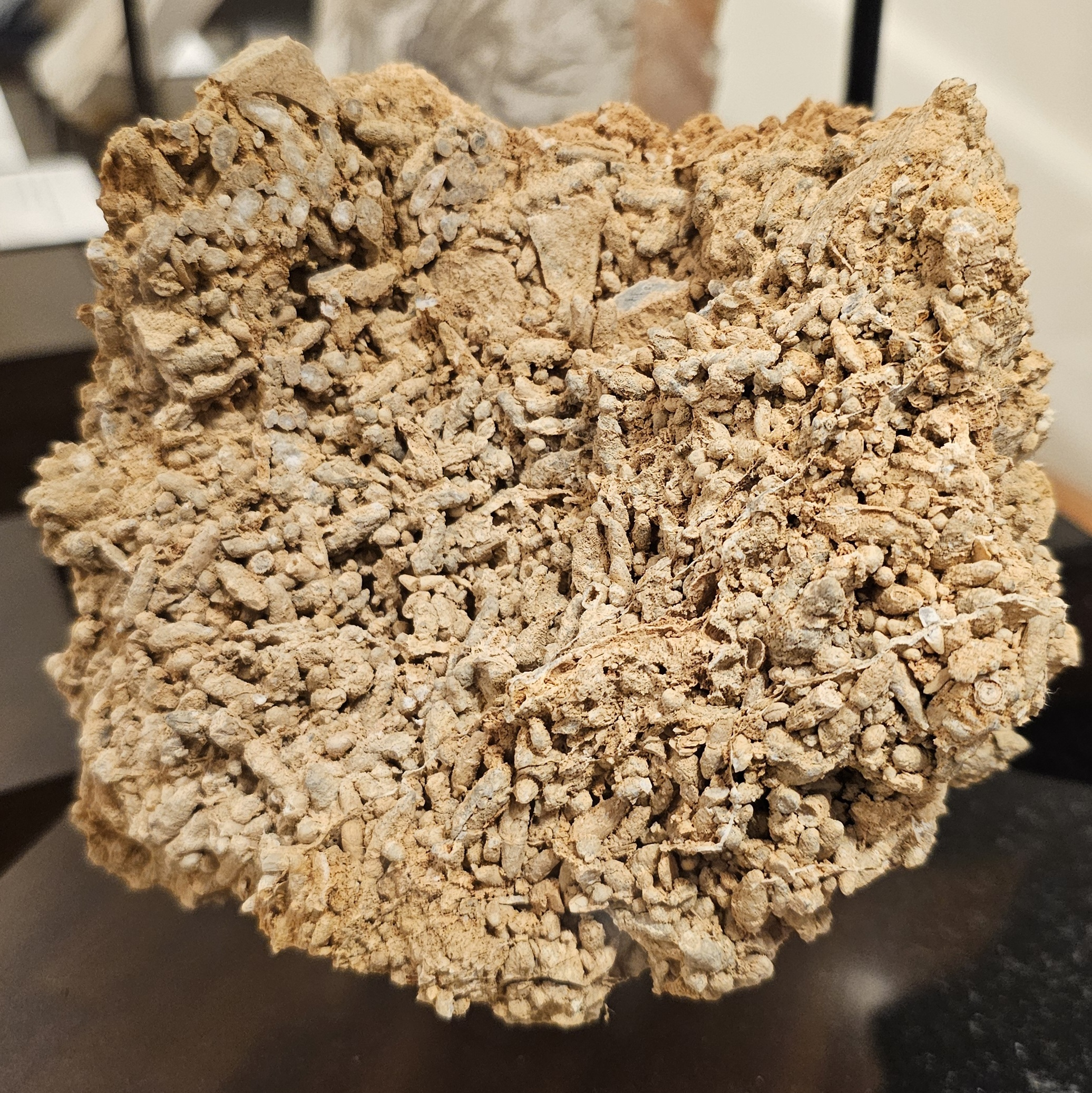

Scientific classification
- Domain: Eukaryota
- Clade: Sar
- Clade: Rhizaria
- Phylum: Retaria
- Subphylum: Foraminifera
- Class: Globothalamea (?)
- Order: †Fusulinida
- Family: †Schwagerinidae
- Genus: †Parafusulina; Dunbar & Skinner, 1931

= Parafusulina =

Parafusulina Temporal range: Permian

Genus of single-celled organisms

Parafusulina is a genus of foraminifera included in the fusulinoidean family Schwagerinidae that were extant during the Permian.

The shell, or test, of Parafusulina is elongate, up to 65 mm in length, fusiform to subcylindrical in shape, tapering slightly to the bluntly rounded poles. The proloculus is large, followed by seven to nine gradually enlarging volutions, coiled around a straight to irregular axis. Septa are numerous, intensely and regularly fluted, folds of adjacent septa touching and forming numerous chamberlets above the floor of the chambers. Walls (spirotheca) are composed of an outer tectum and inner alveolar keriotheca and are thin in relation to the size of the test. Tunnels, single in any individual, are low and well defined but are without bordering chomata. Axial fillings are pronounced. Believed to have existed in the Permian period.
