= Guttulina =

Scientific classification
- Domain: Eukaryota
- (unranked): SAR
- (unranked): Rhizaria
- Superphylum: Retaria
- Phylum: Foraminifera
- Order: Lagenida
- Superfamily: Nodosarioidea
- Family: Polymorphinidae
- Subfamily: Polymorphininae
- Genus: Guttulina d'Orbigny, in De La Sagra, 1939

Genus of single-celled organisms

Guttulina is a genus of nodosariacean forams belonging to the Polymorphinidae and subfamily Polymorphinidae. The test is ovoid to elongate, inflated chambers added in a quinqueloculine spiral series, 144 deg. apart, each successive chamber extending further from the base but strongly overlapping. Sutures depressed, aperture radiate. As with all Nodosarioidea the wall is of finely perforate, radial laminated calcite.
