= Endothyra =

Endothyra Temporal range: Devonian-Triassic ~392–202 Ma

Scientific classification
- Domain: Eukaryota
- Clade: Sar
- Clade: Rhizaria
- Phylum: Retaria
- Subphylum: Foraminifera
- Class: †Fusulinata
- Family: †Endothyridae
- Subfamily: †Endothyrinae
- Genus: †Endothyra; Phillips 1846

Species
- See text

Extinct genus of fusulinid

Endothyra is an extinct genus of fusulinid belonging to the family Endothyridae. Specimens of the genus have been found in Carboniferous beds in North America and many other locations in the world. It was a common and widespread rock-forming fusulinid.

== Species ==
- E. baileyi
- E. bowmani Phillips 1846
