= Globulina (foraminifera) =

Globulina Temporal range: M Jurassic - Holocene

Scientific classification
- Domain: Eukaryota
- (unranked): SAR
- (unranked): Rhizaria
- Superphylum: Retaria
- Phylum: Foraminifera
- Order: Lagenida
- Superfamily: Nodosarioidea
- Family: Polymorphinidae
- Genus: Globulina d'Orbigny, 1839

Synonyms
- Guttulina (Globulina) d'Orbigny

Genus of single-celled organisms

Globulina is a genus of Foraminifera with an ovate to globular test, included in the Polymorphinidae, Notocariacea, that has been extant since the Middle Jurassic (Callovian).

The test, (or shell), is of translucent, perforate, optically radial calcite. The surface smooth or rarely spinose to striate. Chambers are added at first in five planes, a little more than 144 deg. apart, as with the miliolid Quinqueloculina, but spiraling around the long axis; later chambers reduced to only three planes. Chambers are strongly overlapping; sutures oblique, flush to slightly depressed. Aperture terminal.
