= Geinitzia =

Geinitzia may refer to:

- Geinitzia (plant), an extinct genus of conifer
- Geinitzia (insect), an extinct genus of insect

== See also ==
- Geinitzina, a genus of single-celled organism
