= Schwagerina =

Schwagerina Temporal range: Permian

Scientific classification
- Domain: Eukaryota
- Clade: Sar
- Clade: Rhizaria
- Phylum: Retaria
- Subphylum: Foraminifera
- Class: Globothalamea (?)
- Order: †Fusulinida
- Family: †Schwagerinidae
- Subfamily: †Schwagerininae
- Genus: †Schwagerina; Von Muller, 1877

Extinct genus of single-celled organisms

Schwagerina is an extinct genus of fusulinoidean Foraminifera that is used as an Early Permian index fossil. The overall shape of the shell or test is fusiform to subcylindrical, the spirotheca, or outer test wall, is thick, and composed of tectum and alveolar keriotheca; the septa are fluted throughout the length of the shell, intense to top of chambers in some, only in lower parts in others; axial fillings highly variable, chomata distinct or thin and discontinuous.

Tectum is the thin, dark, dense outer layer of the spirotheca, Keriotheca is the thicker, honeycomb-like alveolar, inner layer. Chomata are mounds secreted on the floor of the chamber that connect either side of the tunnel, which interconnects the chambers.

Daixina Ryzovskaya, 1949, is given (Loeblich and Tappan 1964) as a synonym of Schwagerina.

Three genera are similar to Schwagerina, but differ in their internal details. They are:

Paraschagerina, Dunbar and Skinner 1939, from the Lower Permian. The spirotheca is structured as in schwagerina; the first two or three volutions tightly coiled and elongate-fusiform, the outer volutions distinctly inflated-fusiform; septa highly fluted throughout.

Pseudoschwagerina Dunbar and skinner, 1936, Lower Permia. Shell inflated-fusimform; first two or three volutions tightly coiled, outer ones inflated; spirotheca as in Schwaterina. Septa are fluted at the base, close speced at first, wide spaced later. Occidentoschagerina is given as a junior synonym.

Rugososchwagerina Milukho-Maklay, 1959, Upper Permian. Shell inflated-fusiform. First three or four volutions tightly coiled, elongate-fusiform, outer volutions greatly inflated. Spirotheca as with Schwagerina, moderately thin in the tightly coiled portion and next one or two volutions, becoming thick and more coarsely alveolar in the outer two or three. Septa are close spaced in the first three or four volutions, wide spaced in the next two or three, and again close spaced in the outermost.
