= Verbeekinidae =

Scientific classification
- Domain: Eukaryota
- Clade: Sar
- Clade: Rhizaria
- Phylum: Retaria
- Subphylum: Foraminifera
- Class: Globothalamea (?)
- Order: †Fusulinida
- Superfamily: †Fusulinoidea
- Family: †Verbeekinidae; Van Möller

Subfamilies
- See text

Family of single-celled organisms

Verbeekinidae are a family of large fusulinoideans characterized by subspherical, planispirally coiled tests and a long coiling axis. The wall is composed of a dense outer tectum and inner alveolar keriotheca. They are most prominent in Japan and Southeast Asia.

== Lower taxa ==
As presently defined by (Loeblich & Tappan, 1988) the Verbeekinidae includes three subfamilies: Verbinkininae, Missellinindae, and Pseudodoliolininae. The family is entirely Permian, with a range from the Wolfcampian (L Perm.) to the Ochoan (U Perm.)

== Discussion ==
In 1964 Loeblich and Tappan included the Verbeekininae (=Verbeekinidae, sensu 1988) and Neoschwagerininae (= Neoschwagerinidae sensu 1988) in the Verbeekinidae. Treatise. They defined the Verbeekinidae as having a medium-sized, distinctly fusiform ellipsoid morphology with close-spaced foramina along the base of the septa. A spirotheca (outer wall) composed of tectum and keriotheca was found in early examples of Veebeekinidae, but in later genera may have consisted of a single homogeneous layer. The Verbeekinidae can be equated with the Neoschagerinidae of Cushman.

The Verbeekinidae and Neoschwagerinidae are currently distinguished from earlier fusulinoideans, e.g. Fusuninidae and Schwagerinidae, by straight, unfluted or uncorrugated septa, the presence of "I-beam" like transverse, and an axial septula that hang from the spermatheca, partially subdividing the chambers. The septula reinforced the fluted septa rather than corrugated it.
