= Emeishan =

Emeishan may refer to:

- Mount Emei, mountain in Sichuan, China
- Emeishan (city), in Leshan, Sichuan, China
- Emeishan Traps, flood basalt volcanic province in southwestern China, centered in Sichuan
