= Pachyphloiidae =

Pachyphloiidae Temporal range: Permian

Scientific classification
- Domain: Eukaryota
- Clade: Sar
- Clade: Rhizaria
- Phylum: Foraminifera
- Class: †Fusulinata
- Superfamily: †Geinitzinoidea
- Family: †Pachyphloiidae; Loeblich and Tappan, 1984

Genera
- see text

Family of single-celled organisms

Pachyphloiidae is a family of uniserial Permian Foraminifera included in the fusulinid superfamily Geinitzinoidea along with the Geinitzinidae. Three genera are recognized. They are:
Pachyphloia, type
Robustopachyphloia,
Maichelina

Pachyphloiid genera are characterized by their free, compressed, uniserial tests with broad low chambers recurved laterally and microgranular calcareous walls with secondary lamellar thickening on both sides which distinguishes them from the ancestral Geinitzinidae.
