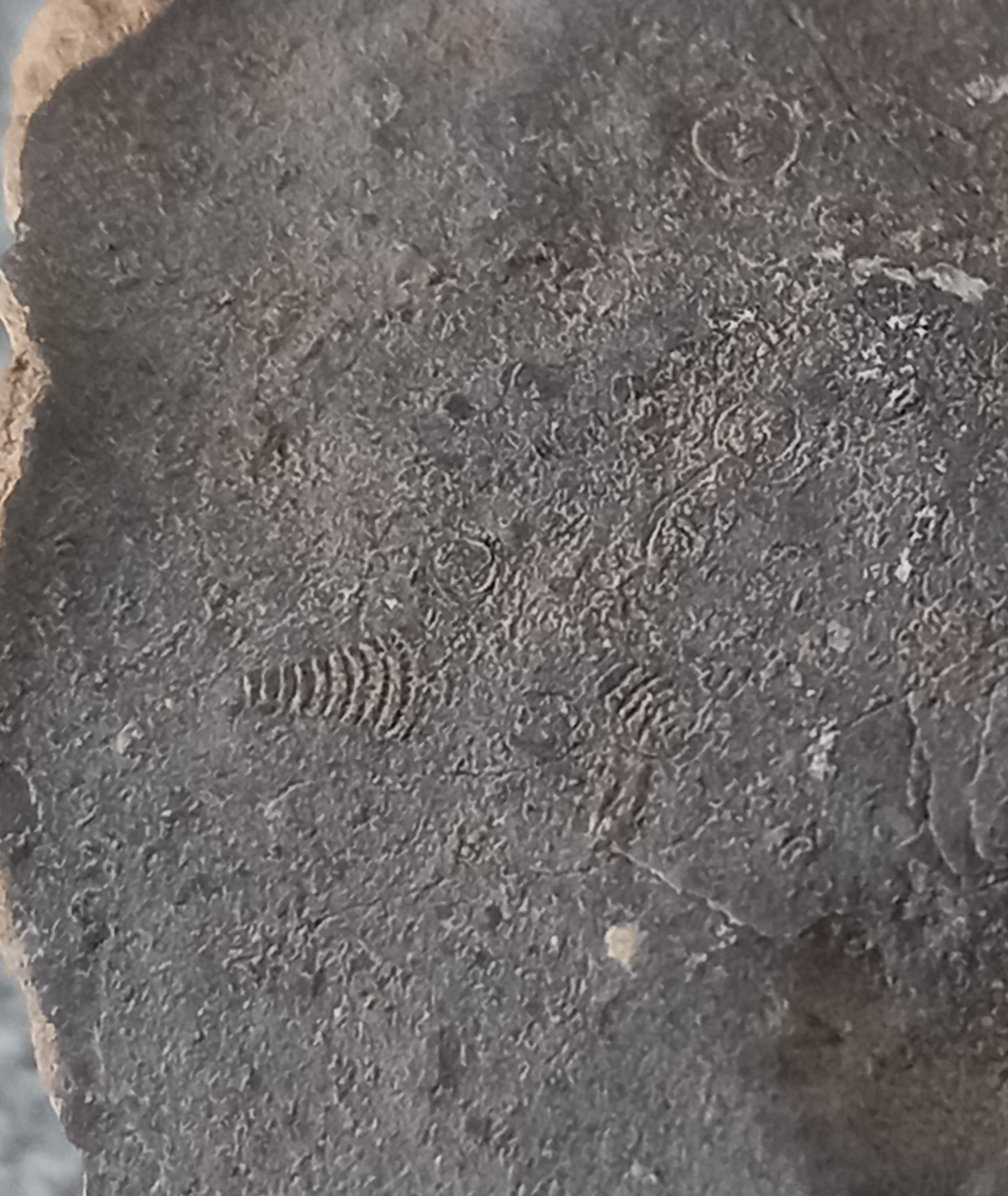
- Geinitzina fossil from the Permian of Iran

Scientific classification
- Domain: Eukaryota
- Clade: Sar
- Clade: Rhizaria
- Phylum: Retaria
- Subphylum: Foraminifera
- Class: †Fusulinata
- Subclass: †Fusulinina
- Superfamily: †Geinitzinoidea; Bozorgnia 1973

Families
- See text

Synonyms
- Geinitzinacea

= Geinitzinoidea =

Geinitzinoidea Temporal range: Late Devonian–Late Permian

Superfamily of single-celled organisms

The Geinitzinoidea comprises a superfamily of Upper Devonian to Upper Permian uniserial fusulinids (microgranular foraminifera with chambers aligned in a single row), the chamber walls consisting of a dark microgranular inner layer and radially fibrous outer layer. Advanced forms show secondary lateral thickening

The Geinitzinoidea differs from the Nodosinelloidea in that in the Nodosinelloidea the inner layer is fibrous.

Two families are included, the Geinitzinidae and Pachyphloiidae.
