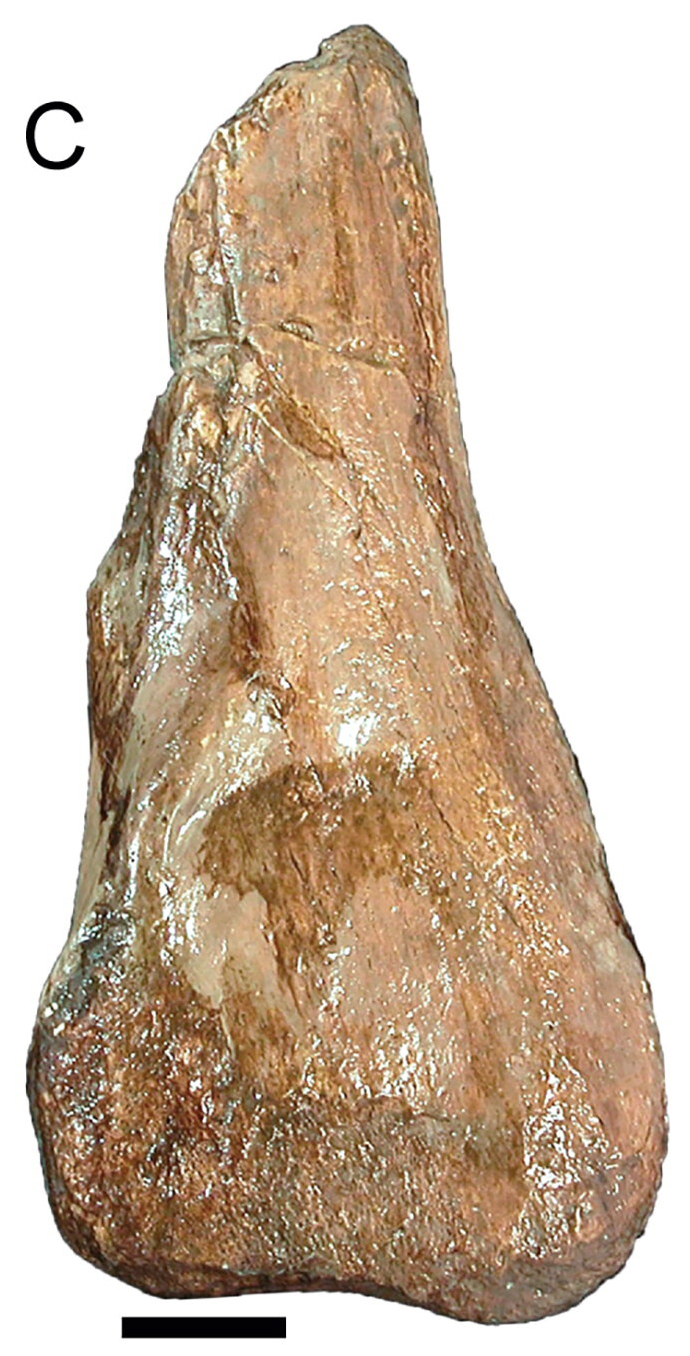
- Holotype lower part of the tibia

Scientific classification
- Kingdom: Animalia
- Phylum: Chordata
- Class: Reptilia
- Clade: Dinosauria
- Clade: Saurischia
- Clade: Theropoda
- Clade: Averostra
- Genus: †Ozraptor; Long & Molnar, 1998
- Species: †O. subotaii

Binomial name
- †Ozraptor subotaii Molnar, 1998

= Ozraptor =

Ozraptor Temporal range: Middle Bajocian, ~169 Ma

Extinct genus of dinosaurs

Ozraptor (meaning "Australian thief") is a genus of possibly abelisauroid theropod dinosaur from the Middle Jurassic (Bajocian) Colalura Sandstone of Australia, known from fragmentary remains. It is notable for being both the first Jurassic theropod dinosaur bone from Australia, and the first Western Australian dinosaur to receive a formal name.

== Discovery and naming ==
In 1966 a group of four Year 12 Scotch College geology students on a field exercise found a fossil at the Bringo Railway Cutting site near Geraldton, which they showed to professor Rex Prider of the University of Western Australia. He had a cast made that he sent to experts of the British Museum of Natural History in London who thought it likely belonged to an extinct turtle. Re-evaluation of the bone in the 1990s after being prepared out of the rock by John Albert Long and Ralph Molnar classified the fossil as the shinbone of a genus of theropods.

In 1998 Long and Molnar named and described the type (and only) species Ozraptor subotaii. The generic name is derived from "Ozzies", the nickname for Australians, and a Latin raptor, "seizer". The specific name honours a fictional character, the swift-running thief and archer "Subotai" from the movie Conan the Barbarian.

The holotype, UWA 82469, was found in the Colalura Sandstone, dating to the middle Bajocian, about 169 million years ago. It consists of the distal or lower end of a left tibia. Together with Rhoetosaurus, Ozraptor is among the oldest known Australian dinosaurs.

The specimen is 8 centimetres (3.1 in) long and 4 centimetres (1.6 in) wide at the lower end. From these measurements, a total length for the shinbone was estimated of about 17 to 20 centimetres (6.7 to 7.9 in) and for the animal as a whole of about 2 metres (6.6 ft). Three diagnostic features were established enabling it to be upheld as a distinct species of dinosaur: the ascending process of the astragalus had a rectangular shape with a straight upper end; the astragalar facet had a vertical ridge; the medial condyle was weakly developed.

== Classification ==
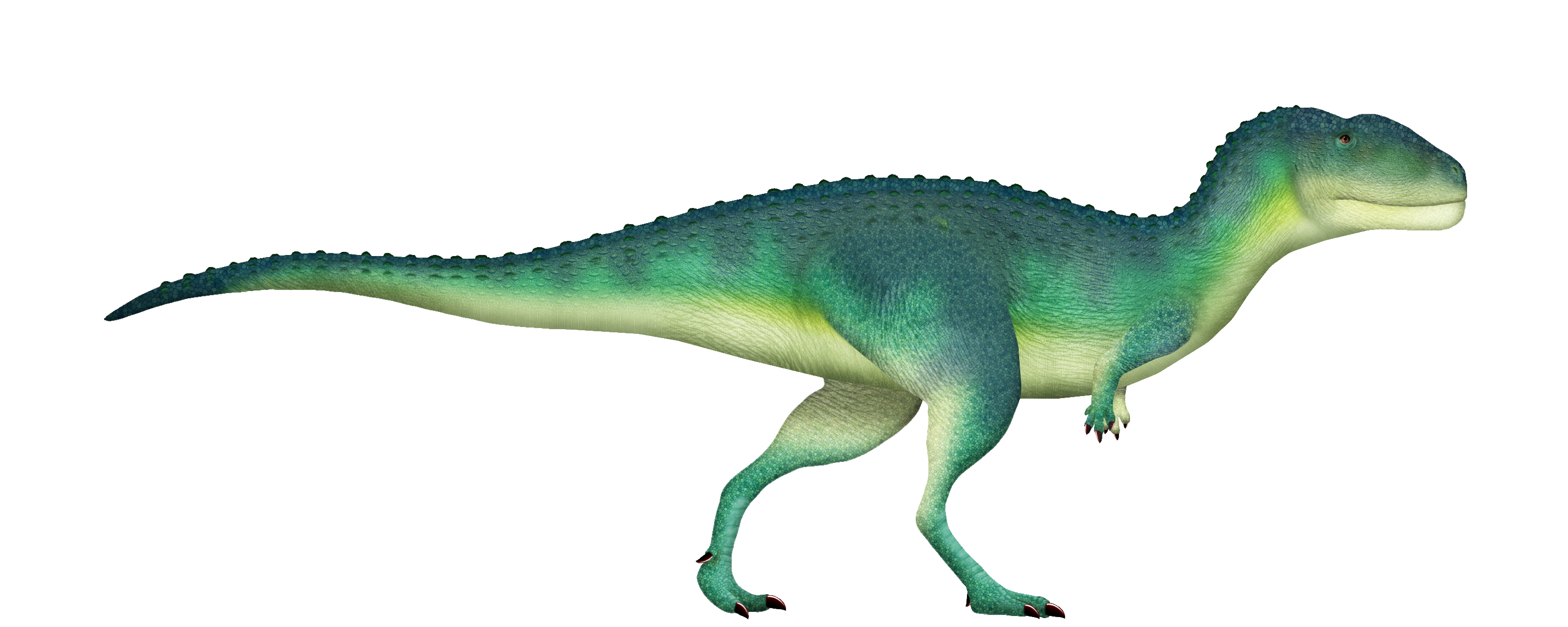
Hypothetical life restoration depicting Ozraptor as an abelisaur

Only known from one partial leg bone, Ozraptor is difficult to classify. In 1998 the describers could not more precisely determine the classification than a Theropoda incertae sedis. In 2004 Thomas Holtz thought it was a member of the Avetheropoda. In 2005 another study, by Oliver Rauhut, suggested that it was indeed a theropod, and more specifically, a member of the Abelisauroidea based on the presence of the distinct vertical median ridge on the astragalar groove. Classified as one, Ozraptor would be the oldest known abelisauroid. However, Rauhut would later go on to conclude that none of these defining characteristics are actually limited to the abelisaurs, and thus Ozraptor can at best be classified as Theropoda indet.

== See also ==
- Timeline of ceratosaur research
- List of Australian and Antarctic dinosaurs
