= Moravamminoidea =

Moravamminoidea Temporal range: Late silurian–Mississippian

Scientific classification
- Domain: Eukaryota
- Clade: Sar
- Clade: Rhizaria
- Phylum: Retaria
- Subphylum: Foraminifera
- Class: Globothalamea (?)
- Order: †Fusulinida
- Superfamily: †Moravamminoidea; Pokorný, 1951

Synonyms
- Moravamminacea

Superfamily of single-celled organisms

The Moravamminoidea is a superfamily of foraminifera within Fusulinida that comprises genera in which the proloculus (initial chamber) is followed by a coiled or straight second chamber, and in which periods of growth result in partial or incipient septa. Contains three families, Caligellidae, Moravamminidae, and Paratickenellidae, with an overall range from the upper Silurian to the Lower Carboniferous (Mississippian).

In older classifications (e.g. Loeblich and Tappan 1964) these were the Moravaminninae, a subfamily within the Parathuraminacea, as then defined.
