= Champion Bay Group =

Stratigraphic group in Australia

- Stratigraphic range: Bajocian; ~170 Ma
- Type: Group
- Sub-units: Colalura Sandstone, Newmarracarra Limestone, Kojarena Sandstone, Bringo Shale
- Underlies: Yarragadee Formation
- Overlies: Chapman Group

Lithology
- Primary: Sandstone, limestone, shale

Location
- Coordinates: 28.8°S 114.9°E
- Approximate paleocoordinates: 40.1°S 57.5°E
- Region: Western Australia
- Country: Australia
- Extent: Perth Basin
- Champion Bay Group (Australia)

The Champion Bay Group is a stratigraphic group in Australia. It was deposited in the Bajocian stage of the Middle Jurassic. The limestones of the group have provided ammonites.
