= Newmarracarroceras =

Newmarracarroceras Temporal range: Middle Jurassic, Bajocian

Scientific classification
- Kingdom: Animalia
- Phylum: Mollusca
- Class: Cephalopoda
- Subclass: †Ammonoidea
- Order: †Ammonitida
- Family: †Sonniniidae
- Subfamily: †Witchelliinae
- Genus: †Newmarracarroceras; Hall, 1989

Species
- N. clarkei Crick, 1894; N. fairbridgei Arkell, 1954

Genus of molluscs (fossil)

Newmarracarroceras is an ammonite from the Newmarracarra Limestone, which is dated to the Middle Jurassic (Bajocian) period. with a ribbed subinvolute shell with a keel running along the venter, or outer rim. The umbilicus is moderately wide, exposing the inner whorls exposed in part.
