= Nodosinelloidea =

Nodosinelloidea Temporal range: Late Silurian–Permian

Scientific classification
- Domain: Eukaryota
- (unranked): SAR
- (unranked): Rhizaria
- Superphylum: Retaria
- Phylum: Foraminifera
- Order: Fusulinida
- Superfamily: Nodosinelloidea Rhumbler, 1895

Families
- See text

Synonyms
- Nodosinellacea

Superfamily of single-celled organisms

The Nodosinelloidea is a superfamily of fusulinids (microganular foraminifera) in which the test is of one or more distinct chambers with the wall single layered or with a microgranular outer layer and fibrous inner layer. Differs from the Geinitzinoidea in that the latter has the layers reversed.

The Nodosinelloidea, which has a stratigraphic range from the Upper Silurian to the Permian, includes two families, the Earlandinitidae and the Nodosinellidae.
