= Zemistephanus =

Zemistephanus Temporal range: Jurassic

Scientific classification
- Kingdom: Animalia
- Phylum: Mollusca
- Class: Cephalopoda
- Subclass: †Ammonoidea
- Genus: †Zemistephanus; McLearn, 1927

Zemistephanus is an extinct ammonite genus from the middle Jurassic of western North America and Western Australia, named by McLearn 1927. Zemistephanus is included in the stephanoceratoid family Otoitidae, which are characterized by shells that begin as barrel-shaped cadicones but which become planulate later in life. Body chambers are reduced in size and are excentric. Similar genera are Pseudotoites and Emileia
