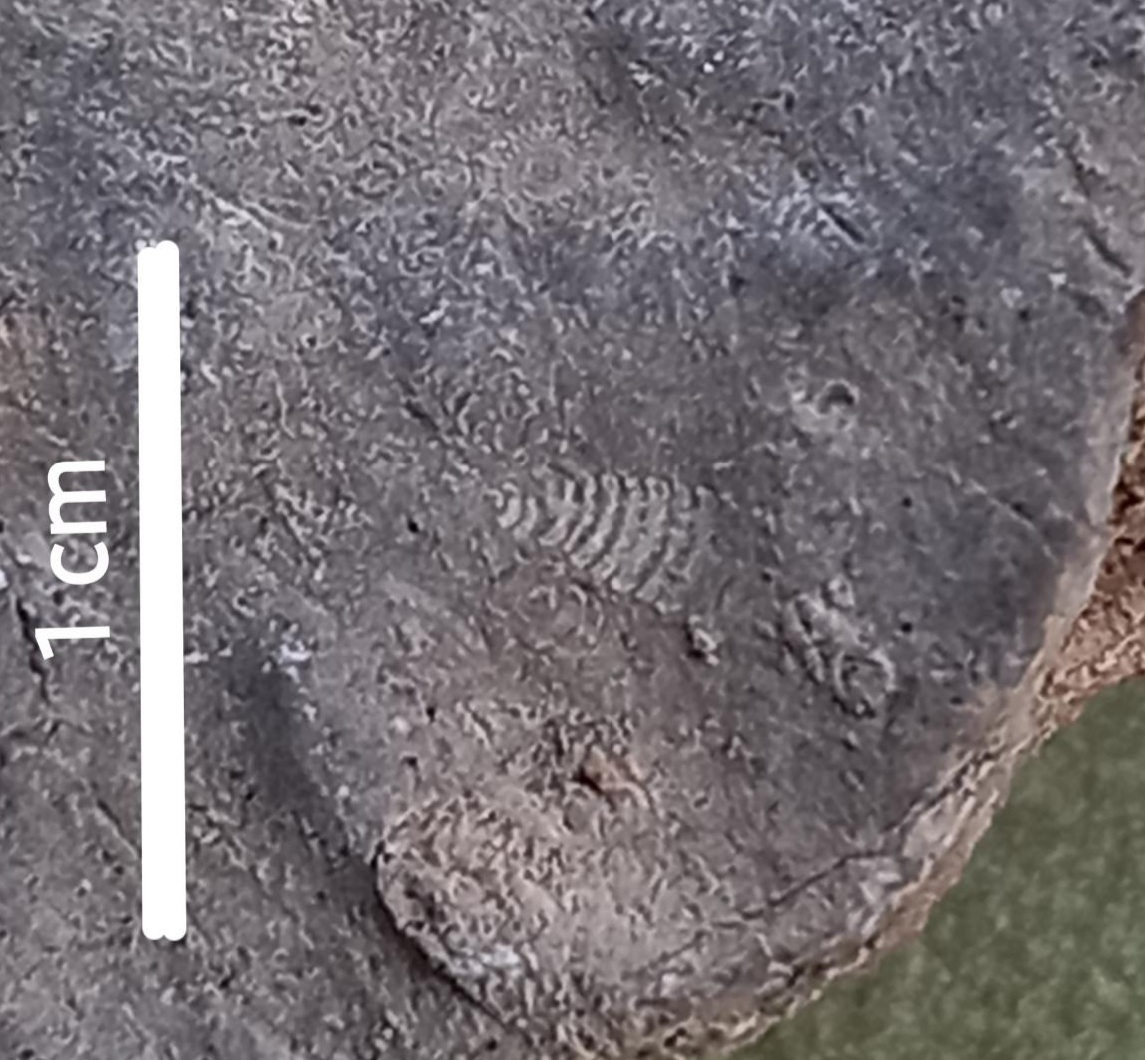
- Fossil Geinitzina Postcarbonica from the Permian Period, Rote Formation, Iran

Scientific classification
- Domain: Eukaryota
- Clade: Sar
- Clade: Rhizaria
- Phylum: Retaria
- Subphylum: Foraminifera
- Class: †Fusulinata
- Family: †Geinitzinidae
- Genus: †Geinitzina; Spandel, 1901

= Geinitzina =

Geinitzina Temporal range: Late Mississippian – Permian, ?Triassic

Extinct genus of single-celled organisms

Geinitzina is a genus of Foraminifera (Protista or Protozoa) from the early Carboniferous (late Mississippian to the late Permian that may have extended into the Triassic. Chambers are uniserial, arranged in a single row, or line. Test wall is double layered. The outer layer is of hyaline radial calcite, and is light in color. The inner layer is of microgranular calcite, and is dark is color. Both layers are secreted by the protoplasm.

Geinitzina is included in the Fusulinida (Loeblich & Tappan, 1984, 1988) on the basis of test wall composition, in having a secreted microgranular layer.
