= Colalura Sandstone =

Middle Jurassic geologic formation in Australia

- Stratigraphic range: middle Bajocian; ~169 Ma
- Type: Geological formation
- Unit of: Champion Bay Group
- Underlies: Bringo Shale, Newmarracarra Limestone
- Overlies: Moonyoonooka Sandstone
- Thickness: Maximum 8.5 m (28 ft)

Lithology
- Primary: Sandstone, conglomerate
- Other: Claystone, siltstone, shale

Location
- Coordinates: 28.7°S 114.8°E
- Approximate paleocoordinates: 39.8°S 57.5°E
- Region: Western Australia
- Country: Australia
- Extent: Perth Basin
- Colalura Sandstone (Australia) Colalura Sandstone (Western Australia)

The Colalura Sandstone is a Middle Jurassic geologic formation of the Perth Basin of Western Australia. The formation overlies the Moonyoonooka Sandstone.

Dinosaur remains have been recovered from the formation.

== Fossil content ==
Color key: Taxon / Reclassified taxon / Taxon falsely reported as present / Dubious taxon or junior synonym / Ichnotaxon / Ootaxon / Morphotaxon	Notes; Uncertain or tentative taxa are in small text; ~~crossed out~~ taxa are discredited.

=== Dinosaurs ===
==== Sauropods ====
Sauropods of the Colalura Sandstone
Genus	Species	Location	Stratigraphic position	Material	Notes	Image
Sauropoda Indet.	Indeterminate	Western Australia, Australia	Bajocian	Caudal vertebra	An indeterminate sauropod	

==== Theropods ====
Theropods of Colalura Sandstone
Genus	Species	Location	Stratigraphic position	Material	Notes	Image
Ozraptor	O. subotaii	Western Australia, Australia	Bajocian	The distal end of a tibia	A abelisauroid theropod	

=== Plesiosaurs ===
Plesiosaurs of the Colalura Sandstone
Genus	Species	Location	Stratigraphic position	Material	Notes	Image
Plesiosauria Indet.	Indeterminate	Western Australia, Australia	Bajocian	Isolated vertebra and paddle	An indeterminate plesiosaur	

== See also ==
- List of dinosaur-bearing rock formations
  - List of stratigraphic units with few dinosaur genera
