= Viluy traps =

Large igneous province in eastern Siberia

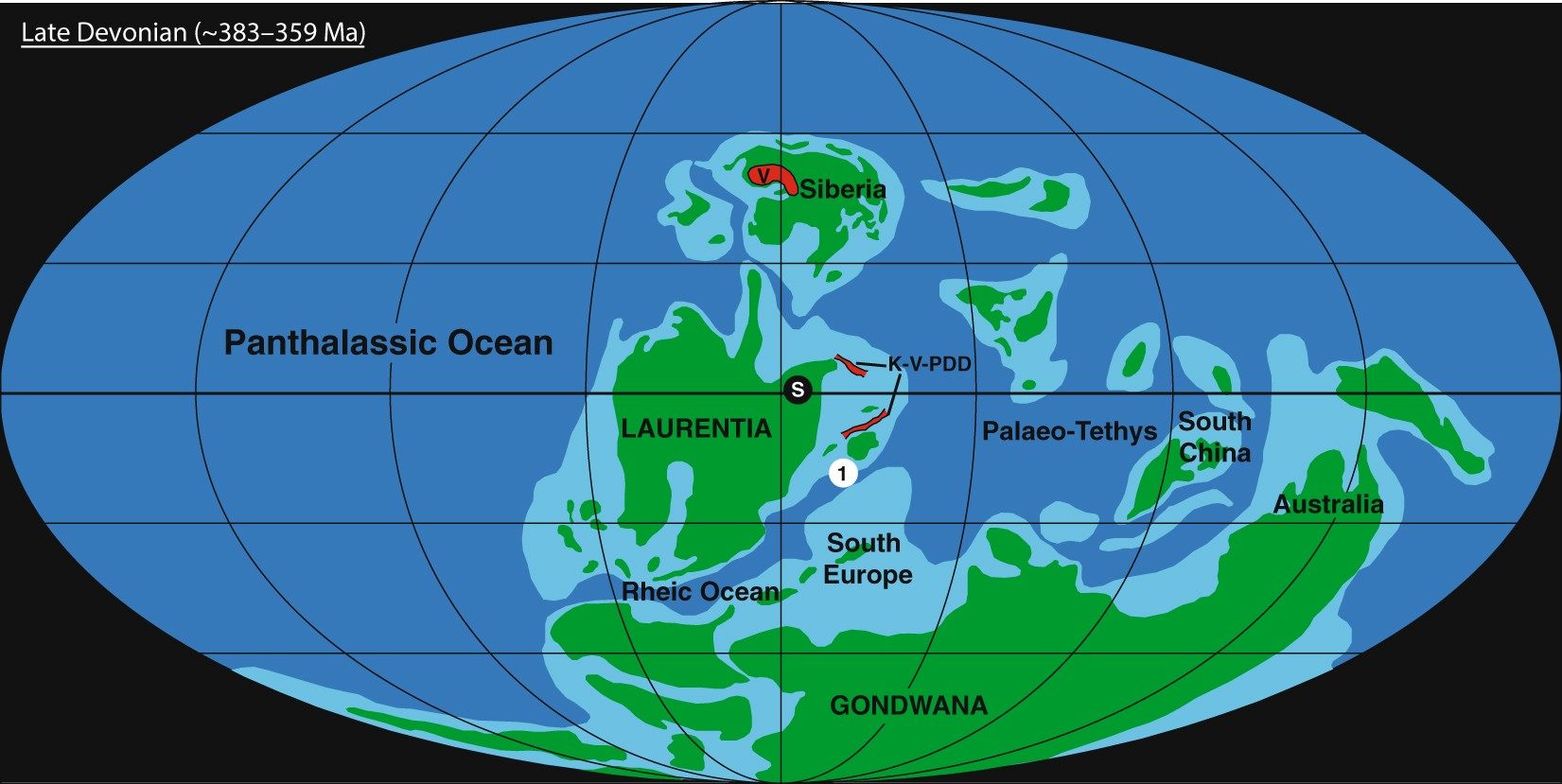
Palaeogeographic map of the Late Devonian period showing the Viluy traps and other features such as, Steinbruch Schmidt (1), Siljan crater (S), and the rift systems of Kola, Vyatka, and Pripyat–Dniepr–Donets (K-V-PDD).

The Viluy trap is a large igneous province (LIP). It is located in eastern Siberia, just east of the more famous Siberian traps which erupted during the end of the Permian period causing the End-Permian mass extinction event (also known as the Great dying). In Siberia, these eruptions caused over a million square kilometers of basalt to form while rifting systems in Eastern Europe formed another million square kilometers of basaltic material.

== Potential extinction ==
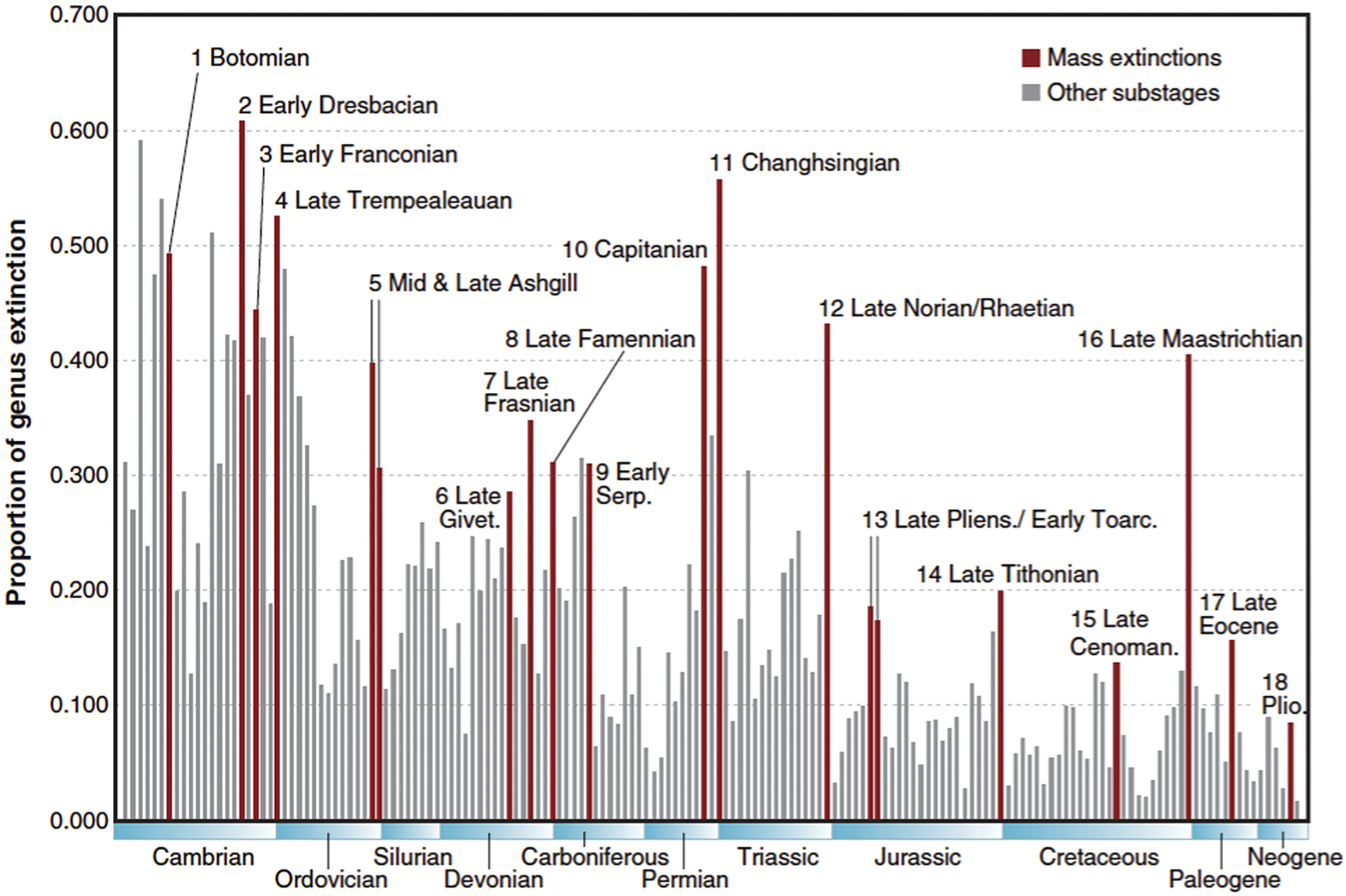
Graph showing major extinction events throughout geological time.

It first erupted during the Late Devonian period. It was long thought that the emplacement of these traps were a major contributor to the Late Devonian extinctions at the Frasnian–Famennian boundary. However the main eruptions occurred at an earlier date (366 ±5 to 381 ±5 Ma) than the extinction event while the secondary pulse occurred towards the end-Devonian. Also, the traps eruptions occurred alongside or at a similar time to two other LIPs, the Kola LIP located on the Kola Peninsula and the Pripyat–Dnieper–Donets (PDD) LIP located in Eastern Europe.
