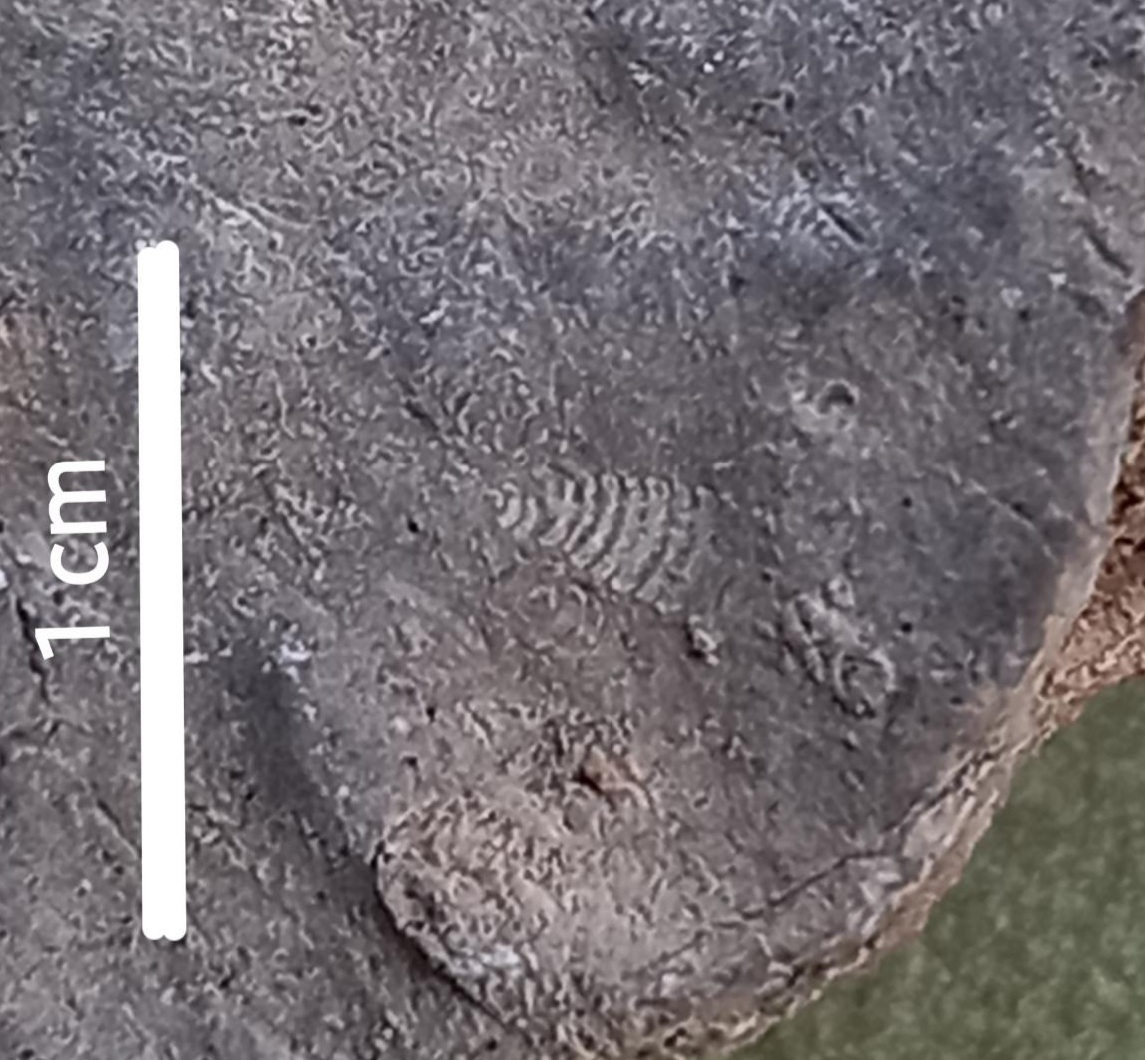
- Geinitzina fossil from the Permian period of Rote formation, Alborz province, Iran

Scientific classification
- Domain: Eukaryota
- Clade: Diaphoretickes
- Clade: SAR
- Clade: Rhizaria
- Phylum: Retaria
- Subphylum: Foraminifera
- Class: †Fusulinata
- Superfamily: †Geinitzinacea
- Family: †Geinitzinidae; Bozorgnia 1973

Genera
- Geinitzina; Eonodosaria; Frondilina; Howchinella; Lunucammina; Spandelinoides

= Geinitzinidae =

Geinitzinidae Temporal range: Late Devonian–Late Permian

Family of single-celled organisms

Geinitzinidae is an extinct family of Foraminifera from the late Paleozoic (U Dev. – U Perm) included in the Fusulinida that comprises genera characterized by unserial tests (chambers arranged in a single row, or line, in which walls are double layered. The outer layer is of light colored hyaline (glassy) radial calcite. The inner layer is a dark, secreted, microgranular calcite.
