= Kojarena Sandstone =

Geologic formation in Australia

- Stratigraphic range: Bajocian
- Type: Geological formation
- Unit of: Champion Bay Group
- Underlies: Yarragadee Formation
- Overlies: Newmarracarra Limestone
- Thickness: Up to 34 m (112 ft)

Lithology
- Primary: Sandstone
- Other: Claystone

Location
- Region: Western Australia
- Country: Australia
- Extent: Perth Basin

The Kojarena Sandstone is a Middle Jurassic geologic formation from Australia. It consists of red-brown, medium- to coarse-grained ferruginous sandstone, with a basal claystone.
