= Schwagerinidae =

Schwagerinidae Temporal range: Middle Pennsylvanian–Late Permian

Scientific classification
- Domain: Eukaryota
- Clade: Sar
- Clade: Rhizaria
- Phylum: Retaria
- Subphylum: Foraminifera
- Class: Globothalamea (?)
- Order: †Fusulinida
- Superfamily: †Fusulinoidea
- Family: †Schwagerinidae; Dunbar and Henbest, 1930

Family of single-celled organisms

The Schwagerinidae comprise a family of large, generally fusiform, foraminiferans included in the Fusulinoidea, a superfamily of fusulinids, locally abundant during the later Carboniferous (Pennsylvanian) and most of the Permian.

M.L. Thompson (1964) gives the following diagnosis: Shell large, fusiform to irregularly cylindrical, planispiral, involute in most, irregularly uncoiled in some; spirotheca thick, composed of tectum and alveolar kariotheca; septa fluted in end zones of primitive genera, fluted completely across shell and to tops of chambers of more advanced genera; tummel singular in most forms, multiple in one genus; axial fillings absent to massive; chomata massive to slight.

As with all fusulinaceans, the Schagerinidae are a shallow water form which in places make up a significant portion of the sediment, now limestone. More familiar genera include Schwagerina, Triticites, and Parafusulina.
