= Emeishan Traps =

Flood basalt igneous province in south-western China

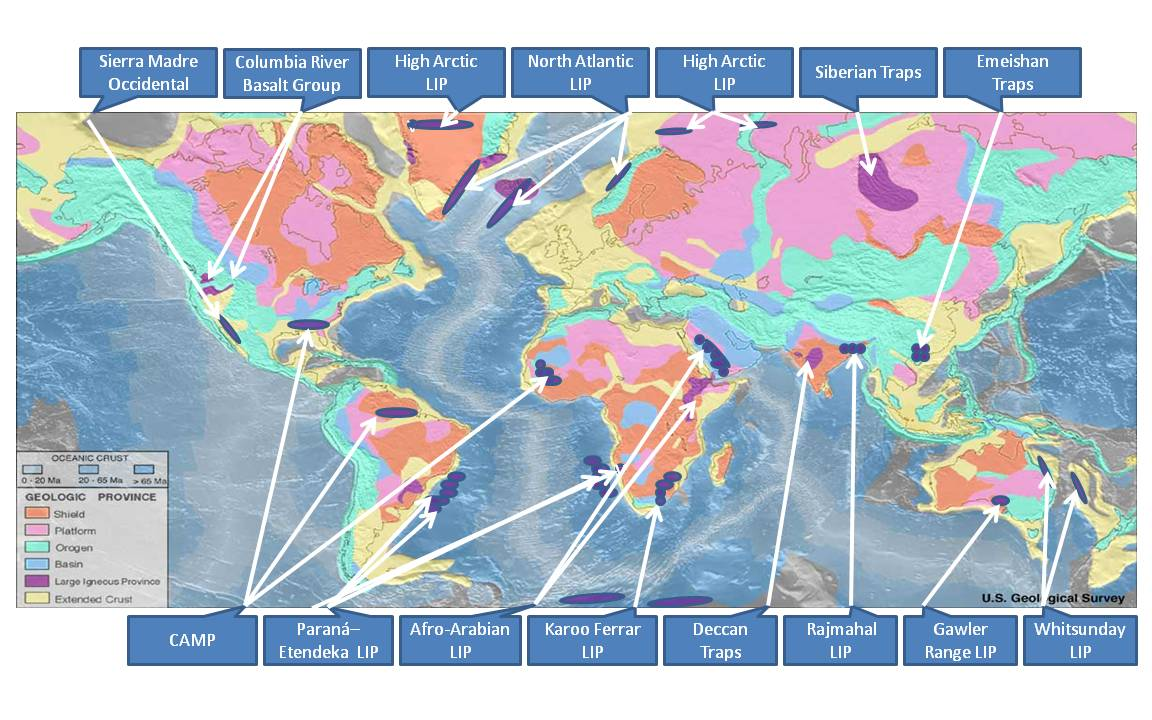
Map of the large igneous provinces (LIPs) with the Emeishan Traps being found in South China, near the Rajmahal, Deccan and Siberian traps.

The Emeishan Traps is a flood basalt volcanic province, or large igneous province located in south-western China, centred in Sichuan province. It is sometimes referred to as the Permian Emeishan Large Igneous Province or Emeishan Flood Basalts. It is named after Emeishan, a mountain located in the Sichuan province. Like other volcanic provinces or "traps", the Emeishan Traps are multiple layers of igneous rock laid down by large mantle plume volcanic eruptions. The Emeishan Traps eruptions were serious enough to have global ecological and paleontological impact being associated with the Capitanian mass extinction.

== Etymology ==
The term "trap" has been used in geology since 1785–1795 for such rock formations. It is derived from the Swedish word for stairs ("trappa") and refers to the step-like hills forming the landscape of the region.

== Formation and development ==
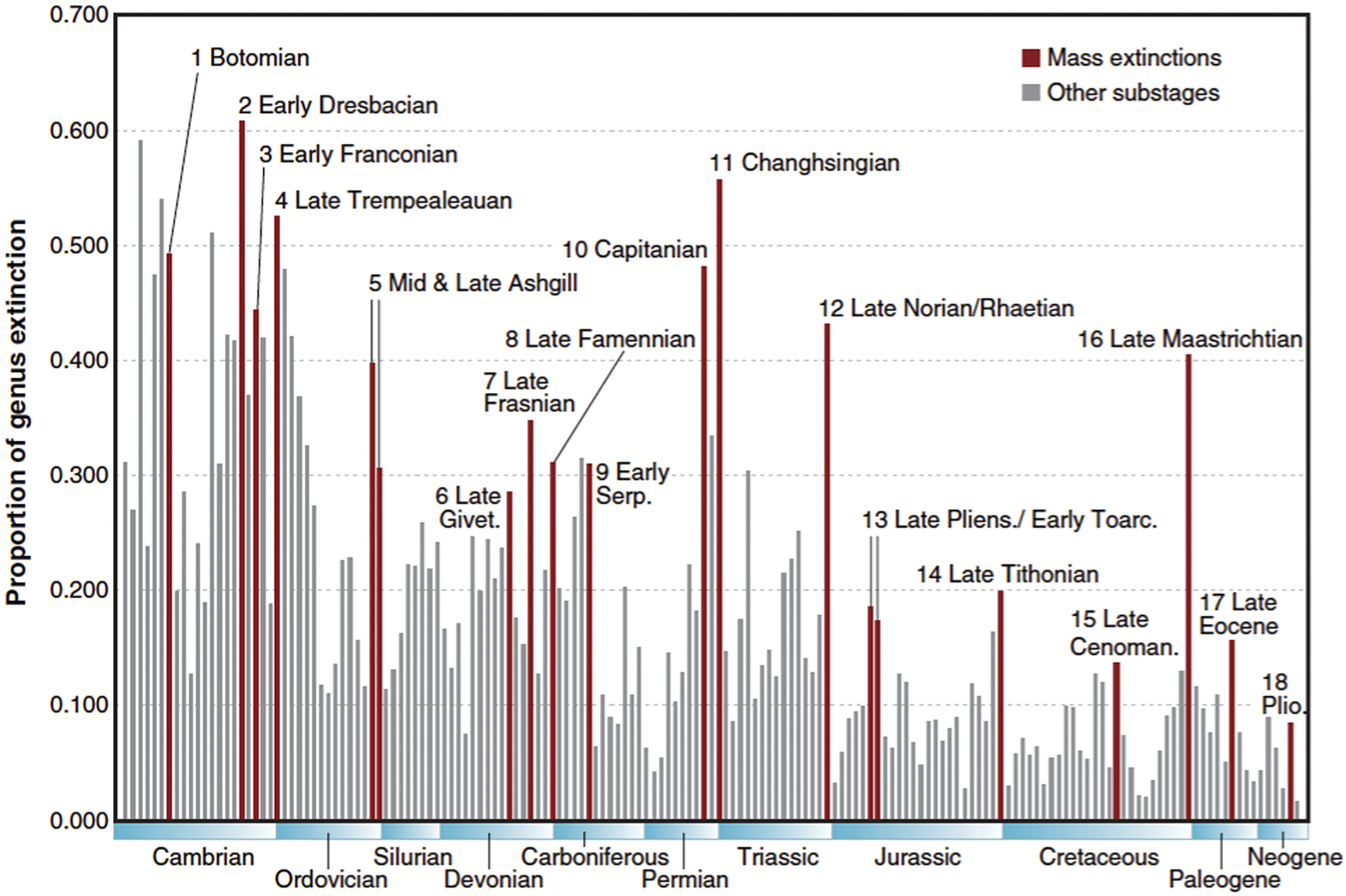
Graph showing major extinction events throughout geological time with the Capitanian being found near the End-Permian mass extinction.

The eruptions that produced the Emeishan Traps began 265 million years ago (Ma) or earlier. The main eruptive period is between 262 and 261 Ma, and the volcanism activities end 259 Ma. In volume, the Emeishan Traps are dwarfed by the massive Siberian Traps, which occurred not long after, at approximately 252 Ma. The Emeishan basalts covers an area of more than 250,000 km^{2} with thicknesses ranging from several hundred meters up to 5.5 km (the average flood basalt thickness throughout the entire region is estimated to be around 700 m), but the Emeishan traps may have initially covered an area as much as 500,000 km^{2}. Thus the entire volume of the Emeishan basalts is estimated to be 300,000 km^{3}. Evidence suggests that the initial volcanism of the central Emeishan Traps occurred in a deep submarine environment without any significant prevolcanic uplift.

Concentrations of atmospheric Carbon dioxide (pCO2) during the early and main eruptions phases declined going from around 700 ppm to around 350 ppm before then increasing in subsequent silicic eruptions. This drop in concentrations are likely the result of increased erosion and weathering of rocks that are part of the kilometer-thick Yangtze craton carbonates. This erosion/weathering started from a regional uplift of the craton. Further evidence to support this drop in atmospheric CO2 levels comes from the fact that Emeishan basalt is particularly poor in CO2.

== Effects ==
The Emeishan Traps are associated with the Capitanian mass extinction event, the extinction of animal and plant life that occurred at the end of the Capitanian stage of the Guadalupian epoch of the Permian period. Limestone within the traps show the extinction to occur immediately below the first eruptive unit, with the mass extinction marked at the onset of explosive Emeishan volcanism. The formation of volcaniclastics suggest violent phreatomagmatic-style eruptions. The synchrony between the Emeishan Traps and the Capitanian mass extinction has been taken to support the argument of Vincent Courtillot and others that volcanism is the main driver of mass extinctions.

While the eruptions likely had a significant impact on the life at the time being associated with the Capitanian extinctions, it was never as large as other LIPs such as the Siberian traps or CAMP. This may be due to the absorption of Carbon dioxide from the atmosphere due to erosion and weathering of rocks from events like regional uplifts.

After their emplacement, the Emeishan Traps were eroded and their minerals became encased in coals that formed after their emplacement.

== See also ==
- Deccan Traps
- Viluy Traps
- List of flood basalt provinces
- Siberian Traps
