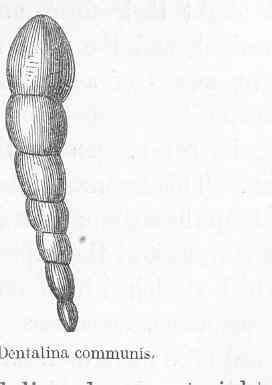

Scientific classification
- Domain: Eukaryota
- Clade: Sar
- Clade: Rhizaria
- Phylum: Retaria
- Subphylum: Foraminifera
- Order: Lagenida; Loeblich and Tappan 1988

Superfamilies
- Robuloidoidea; Nodosarioidea

= Lagenida =

Lagenida Temporal range: Late Silurian - Recent

Order of single-celled organisms

Lagenida is an order of benthic foraminiferal rhizaria in which the tests (shells) are monolamellar, with walls composed of optically and ultra-structurally radiate calcite, with the crystallographic c-axes perpendicular to the surface. Lagenids first appear in the Upper Silurian and continue to the Recent. They are currently divided into two superfamilies, the older Robuloidoidea which range from the Upper Silurian to the Lower Cretaceous (Albian) and the younger Nodosarioidea, ranging from the Permian to Recent.

== Taxonomic history ==
Lagenida (suborder Lagenina in Loeblich and Tappan 1988) is an emendation of the rotaliid superfamily Nodosarioidea, removing it from the Rotaliina in the Treatise on Invertebrate Paleontology (Loeblich and Tappan, 1964) and combining it with the Robuloidoidea, named by Reiss, 1963, to form a new order Lagenida. Robuloidoidea includes families previously included in the Fusulinida and found in either of the superfamilies Parathuramminoidea and Endothyroidea. Provided that robuloidoideans did actually give rise to nodosarioideans in the Triassic, the ultimate ancestry of Lagenida can be found within Fusulinida, but not the better known Fusulinoidea.

== Test morphology ==
Shells (tests) of Lagenida are generally serial in form, with chambers in a line. They may be unilocular with chambers singularly one after the other, or in sets of twos or threes, (bilocular or trilocular). Some trochoidally coiled forms are known. Some have later chambers that are flared out like a fan, others are shaped like leaves.

Lagenida differ from Rotaliida in the manner in which new septa are formed. In both, when a new chamber is formed a new layer of material is added to the outer surface of the entire shell. In the Lagenida, that layer is used to form only the last, or new, septum. All septa remain monolamellar. In the Rotaliida the outer layer not only forms the final septum, but also coats the front of the previous septum, so that only the final septum in monolamellar.
