= Siberian Traps =

Large region of volcanic rock in Russia

Coordinates: 67°N 90°E

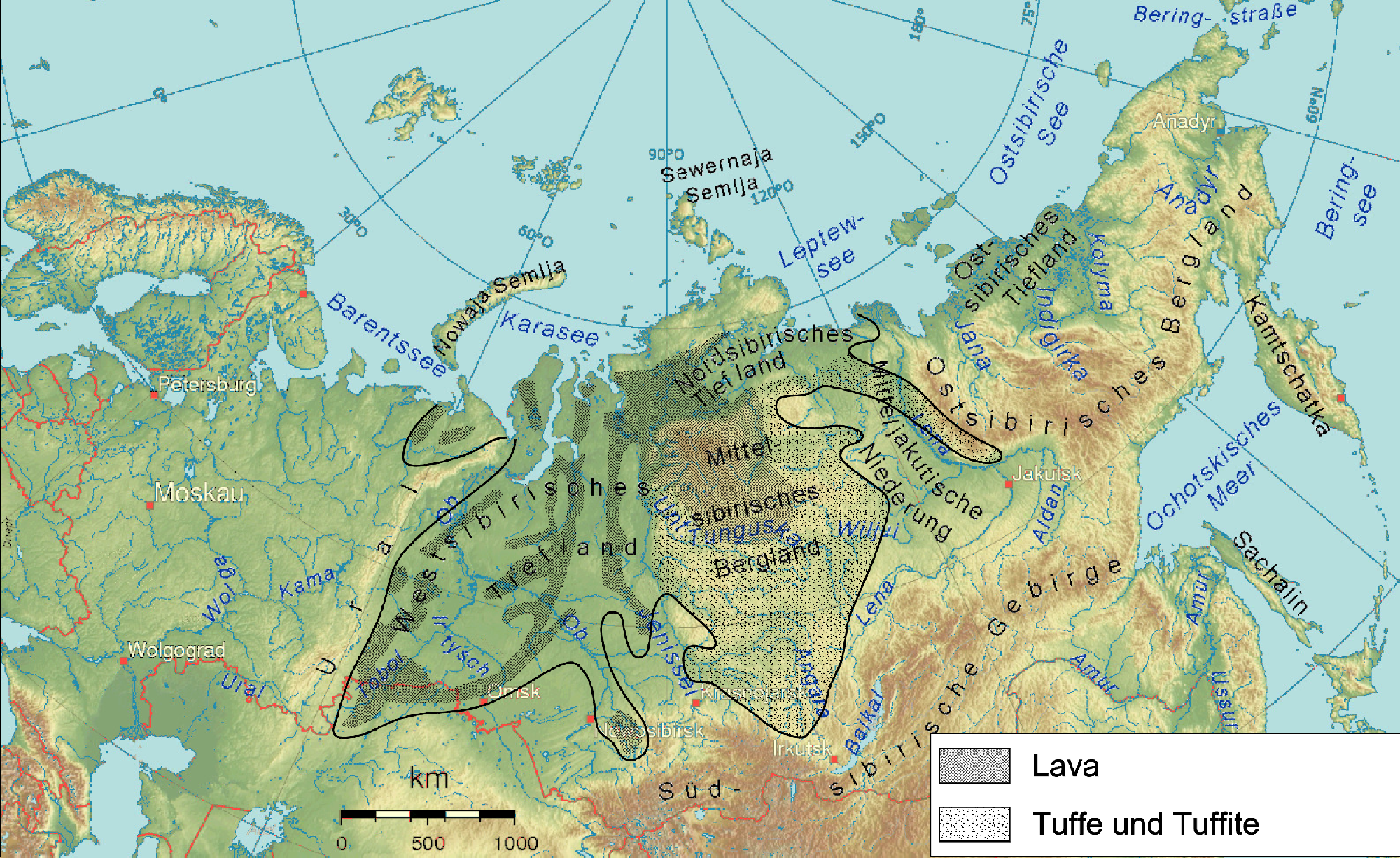
The extent of the Siberian Traps showing where lava, tuff and tuffite were deposited. (map in German)

The Siberian Traps (Russian: Сибирские траппы, romanized: Sibirskiye trappy) are a large region of volcanic rock, known as a large igneous province, in Siberia, Russia. Large volumes of basaltic lava covered a large expanse of Siberia in a flood basalt event. The massive eruptive event that formed the traps is one of the largest-known volcanic events in the last 500 million years. The eruptions continued for roughly two million years and spanned the Permian–Triassic boundary, or P–T boundary, which occurred around 251.9 million years ago. The Siberian Traps are believed to be the primary cause of the Permian–Triassic extinction event, the most severe extinction event in the geologic record. Subsequent periods of Siberian Traps activity have been linked to smaller biotic crises, including the Smithian–Spathian, Olenekian–Anisian, Middle-Late Anisian and Anisian–Ladinian extinction events. Today, the area is covered by about 7 million km^{2} (3 million sq mi) of basaltic rock, with a volume of around 4 million km^{3} (1 million cu mi).

== Etymology ==
The term "trap" has been used in geology since 1785–1795 for such rock formations. It is derived from the Swedish word for stairs ("trappa") and refers to the step-like hills forming the landscape of the region.

== Formation ==
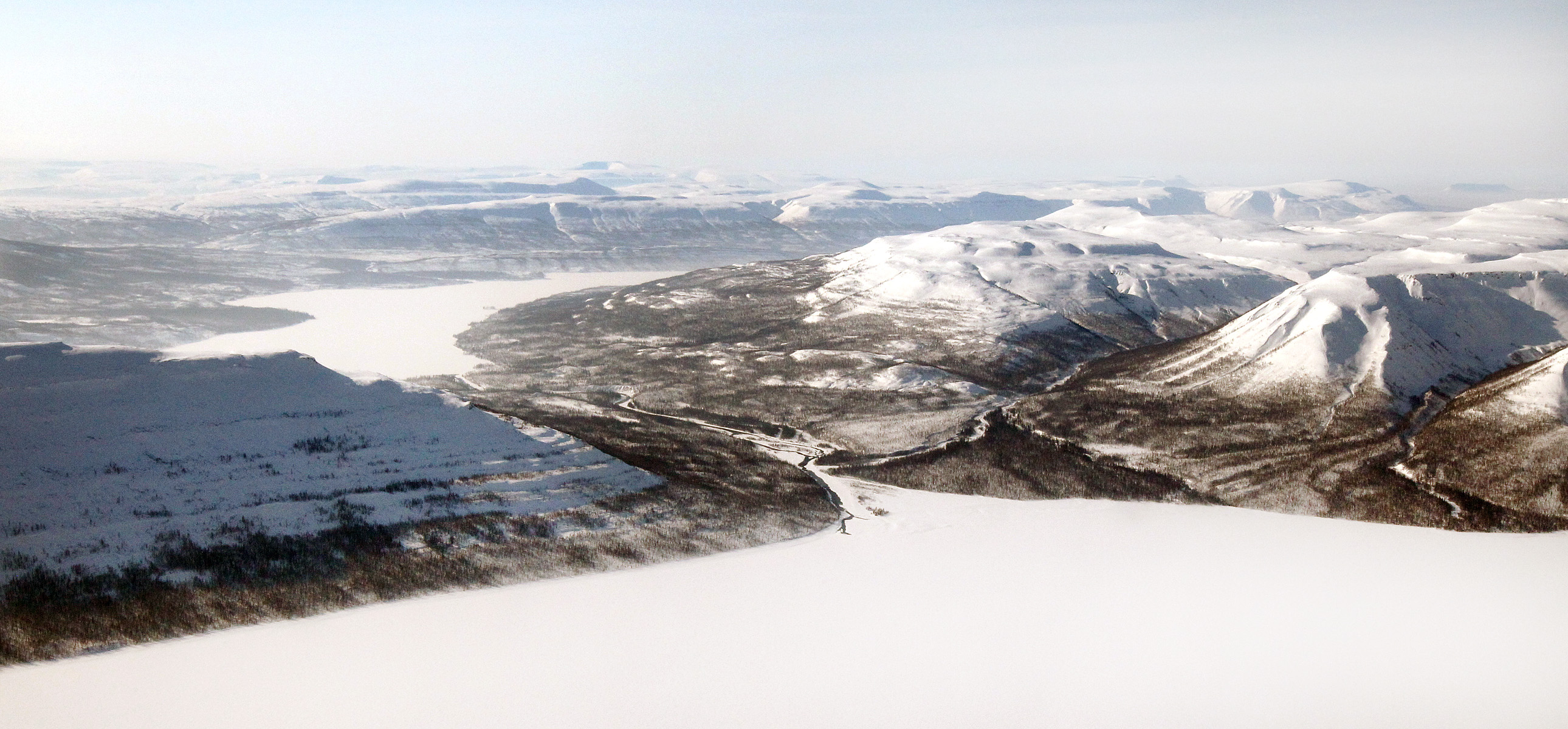
Step-like geomorphology at the Putorana Plateau, which is a World Heritage Site

The source of the Siberian Traps basaltic rock has been attributed to a mantle plume which rose until it reached the bottom of the Earth's crust, producing volcanic eruptions through the Siberian Craton. It has been suggested that, as the Earth's lithospheric plates moved over the mantle plume (the Iceland plume), the plume had earlier produced the Viluy traps to the east, then the Siberian Traps in the Permian and Triassic periods, and produced volcanic activity on the floor of the Arctic Ocean in the Jurassic and Cretaceous, and then generating volcanic activity in Iceland. Other plate tectonic causes have also been suggested. Another possible cause may be the impact that formed the Wilkes Land crater in Antarctica, which is estimated to have occurred around the same time and been nearly antipodal to the traps.

The main source of rock in this formation is basalt, but both mafic and felsic rocks are present, so this formation is officially called a Flood Basalt Province. The inclusion of mafic and felsic rock indicates multiple other eruptions that occurred and coincided with the one-million-year-long set of eruptions that created the majority of the basaltic layers. The traps are divided into sections based on their chemical, stratigraphical and petrographical composition.

The Siberian Traps are underlain by the Tungus Syneclise, a large sedimentary basin containing thick sequences of Early-Mid-Paleozoic-aged carbonate and evaporite deposits, as well as Carboniferous–Permian-aged coal-bearing clastic rocks. When heated, such as by igneous intrusions, these rocks are capable of emitting large amounts of toxic and greenhouse gases.

== Effects on prehistoric life ==
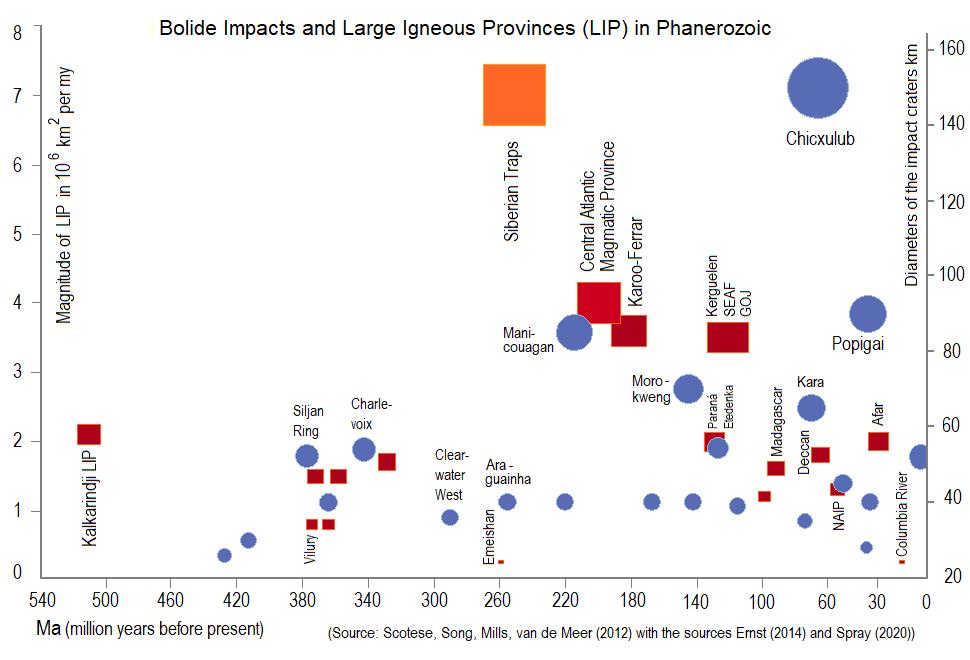
Magnitude of Siberian Traps in comparison with other large igneous provinces and bolide impacts

The Siberian Traps coincide with the Permian–Triassic extinction event, which is the most severe-known extinction event in the history of life on earth. Sedimentary, palaeontological and geochemical records of the mass extinction indicate that it was caused by a cascade of environmental changes. The emission of large magnitudes of CO_{2}, SO_{2}, halogens and metals by the eruptions led to global warming, oceanic anoxia, oceanic acidification, ozone reduction, acid rain and metal poisoning, triggering major extinctions in terrestrial and marine ecosystems, with slightly different timing on land and in the sea. The relative timing of the exceptionally voluminous magmatism and the extinction, and the potential of this magmatism to generate the immense volumes of greenhouse gases involved, suggests that the Siberian Traps were ultimately responsible for the extinction. Nevertheless, the ultimate reasons for the exceptional severity of the Permian–Triassic mass extinction remain debated. Several other mechanisms causing the extinction or contributing to its severity have been proposed.

== Dating ==
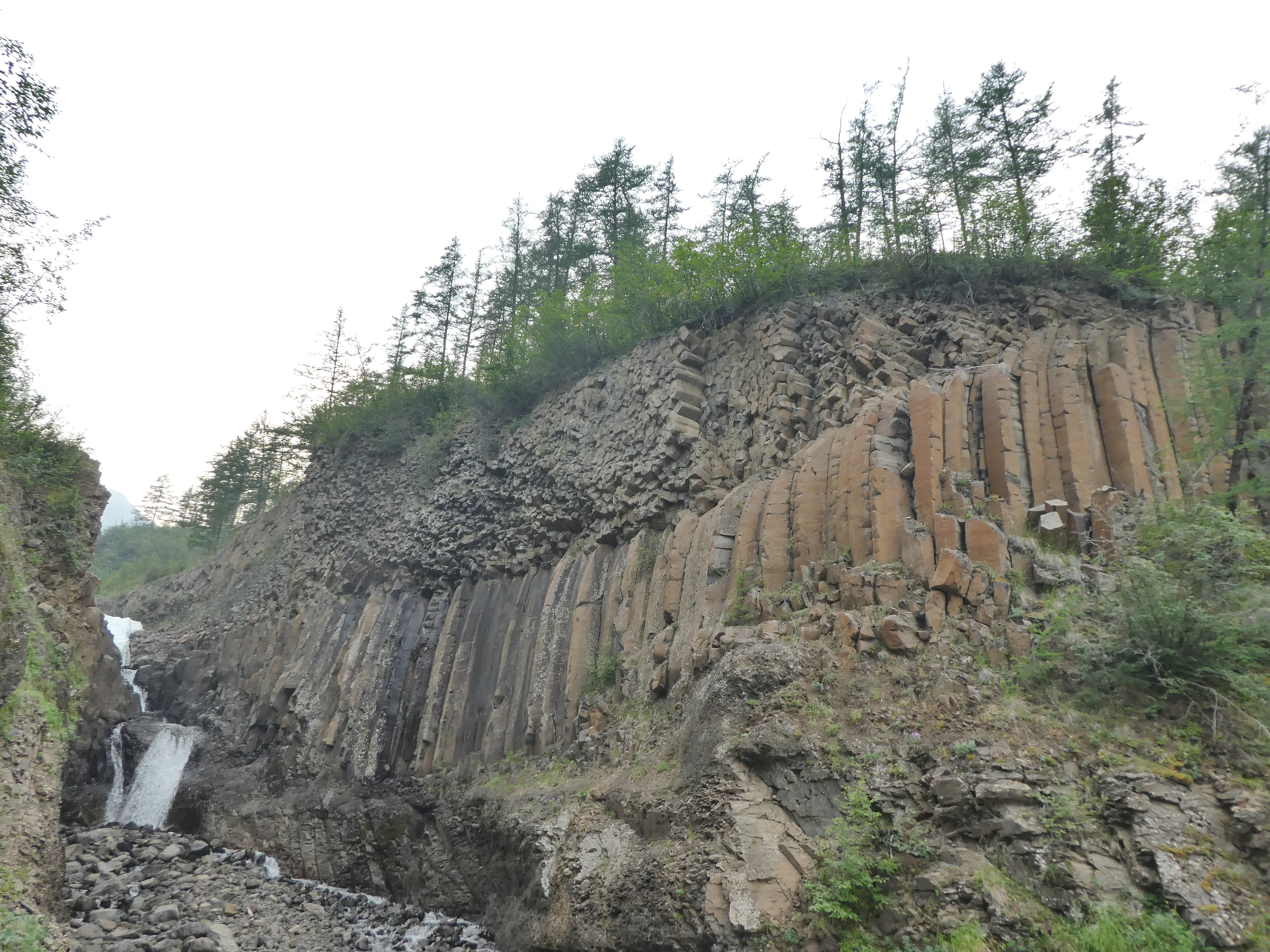
Columnar jointing in igneous rock of the Putorana Plateau

The volcanism that occurred in the Siberian Traps resulted in copious amounts of magma being ejected from the Earth's crust—leaving permanent traces of rock from the same time period of the mass extinction that can be examined today. More specifically, zircon is found in some of the volcanic rocks. To improve the accuracy of the age of the zircon, several variously aged pieces of zircon were organized into a timeline based on when they crystallized. The CA-TIMS technique, a chemical abrasion age-dating technique that eliminates variability in accuracy due to lead depletion in zircon over time, was then used to accurately determine the age of the zircons found in the Siberian Traps. Eliminating the variability due to lead, the CA-TIMS age-dating technique allowed uranium within the zircon to be the centre focus in linking the volcanism in the Siberian Traps that resulted in high amounts of magmatic material with the Permian–Triassic mass extinction.

To further the connection with the Permian–Triassic extinction event, other disastrous events occurred around the same time period, such as sea level changes, meteor impacts and volcanism. Specifically focusing on volcanism, rock samples from the Siberian Traps and other southern regions were obtained and compared. Basalts and gabbro samples from several southern regions close to and from the Siberian Traps were dated with the argon–argon method. Feldspar and biotite were specifically used to focus on the samples' ages and duration of the presence of magma from the volcanic event in the Siberian Traps. The majority of the basalt and gabbro samples dated to 250 million years ago, covered a surface area of 5 million km^{2} (1.9 million sq mi) on the Siberian Traps, and occurred within a short period of time with rapid rock solidification and cooling. Studies confirmed that samples of gabbro and basalt from the same time period of the Permian–Triassic event from the other southern regions also matched the age of samples within the Siberian Traps. This confirms the assumption of the linkage between the age of volcanic rocks within the Siberian Traps, along with rock samples from other southern regions to the Permian–Triassic mass extinction event.

== Mineral deposits ==
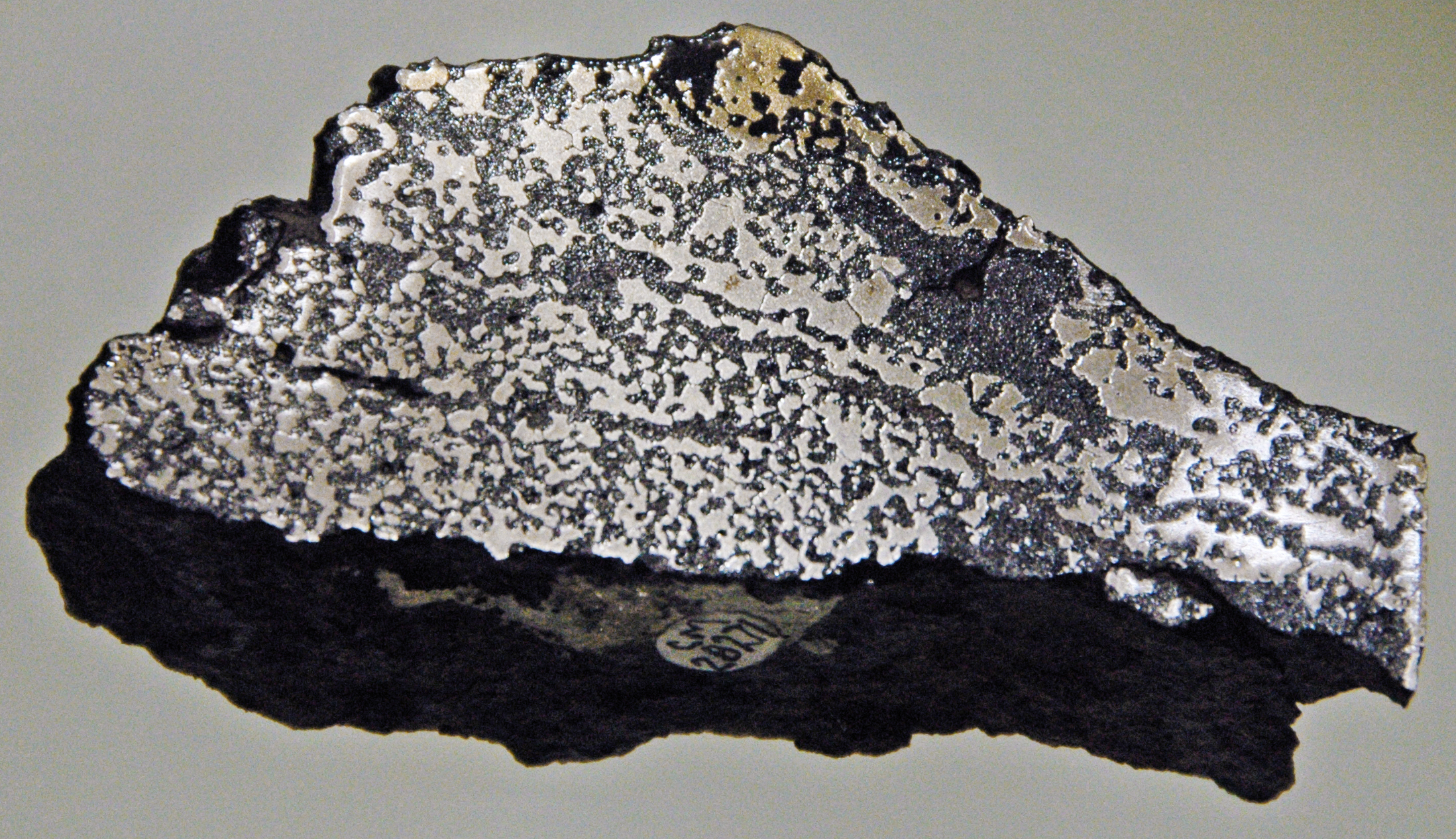
A sample of Siberian Traps basalt (dark) containing native iron (from the Putorana Plateau)

The giant Norilsk–Talnakh nickel–copper–palladium deposit formed within the magma conduits in the most complete part of the Siberian Traps. It has been linked to the Permian–Triassic extinction event, based on large amounts of nickel and other elements found in rock beds that were laid down after the extinction occurred. The method used to correlate the extinction event with the surplus amount of nickel located in the Siberian Traps compares the timeline of the magmatism within the traps and the timeline of the extinction itself. Before the link between magmatism and the extinction event was discovered, it was hypothesized that the mass extinction and volcanism occurred at the same time due to the linkages in rock composition.

== See also ==
- List of flood basalt provinces
