= Endothyroidea =

Endothyroidea Temporal range: Late Devonian–Late Permian

Scientific classification
- Domain: Eukaryota
- (unranked): SAR
- (unranked): Rhizaria
- Superphylum: Retaria
- Phylum: Foraminifera
- Order: Fusulinida
- Superfamily: Endothyroidea Brady, 1884
- Family: Endothyridae Brady, 1884

Subfamilies
- See text

Synonyms
- Endothyracea

Superfamily of single-celled organisms

The Endothyroidea is a superfamily in the foraminiferal order, Fusulinida known from the upper Devonian to the Lower Permian. Probably ancestral to the Fusulinoidea.

== Diagnosis ==
Fusulinida with multichambered, septate tests, planispirally to streptospirally coiled at least in the early stage, may uncoil and become straight in the late growth stage.

== Taxonomy ==
=== Taxonomic relationships ===
The Endothyroidea, as presented in the Treatise was one of only three superfamilies in the Fusulinina, the others being the Parathuramminoidea and Fusulinoidea. With the discovery of more genera since publication of the Treatise in 1964 and the concomitant development of new perspectives, the Endothyroidea was split into a number of newly defined superfamilies, included in a revised and smaller Endothyroidea based on the family Endothyridae.

=== Taxonomy ===
The Endothyroidea, as now defined, envelops the Endothyridae and contains the following subfamilies.

Endostaffellinae
Endothyrinae
Endothyranoposinae
:Haplophragmellinae
