= Parathuramminoidea =

Parathuramminoidea Temporal range: Silurian - Permian

Scientific classification
- Domain: Eukaryota
- (unranked): SAR
- (unranked): Rhizaria
- Superphylum: Retaria
- Phylum: Foraminifera
- Order: Fusulinida
- Superfamily: Parathuramminoidea E. V. Bykova, 1955

Families
- See text

Synonyms
- Parathuramminacea

Superfamily of single-celled organisms

Parathuramminoidea comprises a superfamily within the foraminiferal order Fusulinida, characterized by tests (shells) that are unilocular, globular to elongate or irregular, or that may consist of a series or cluster of such chambers. Forms are either free or attached.

Parathuramminoidea is one of three superfamilies making up the Fusulinina in the Treatise on Invertebrate Paleontology Part C, 1964, but as of 1988 (or prior to) expanded to thirteen. Additional superfamilies being created out of the original three.

Parathuramminoideans were originally described as Fusulinida that consist of a single globular or tubular chamber, or cluster of such chambers. Test wall simple, consisting of calcareous granules in calcareous cement. At that time it was divided into the globular Parathuraminidae, tubular or enrolled Caligellidae, and globular to tubular Moravamminidae.
