= Nodosarioidea =

Nodosarioidea Temporal range: ?Permian – Recent

Scientific classification
- Domain: Eukaryota
- Clade: Sar
- Clade: Rhizaria
- Phylum: Retaria
- Subphylum: Foraminifera
- Order: Lagenida
- Superfamily: Nodosarioidea; Ehrenberg, 1838

Families
- Nodosariidae; Ellipsolagenidae; Glandulinidae; Lagenidae; Polymorphinidae; Vaginulinidae

Synonyms
- Nodosariacea

Superfamily of single-celled organisms

Nodosarioidea is one of two superfamilies making up the foraminiferal order Lagenida. The other being the Robuloidoidea. Of these two Nodosarioidea is the more advanced, as well as being the younger.

Nodosarioidea are characterized by planispirally coiled, uncoiled, or straight chambers, or which are coiled about a longitudinal axis. Test (or shell) walls are of finely perforate, radial laminated calcite. Apertures are peripheral or terminal, variable in form. Septa, dividing the chambers, are unilamellar, composed of a single layer, while the outer walls may be multilamellar, composed of multiple layers built up with the addition of new chambers.

Loeblich and Tappan, in 1964, in the Treatise on Invertebrate Paleontology included the Nodosarioidea in the Rotaliina, with a range extending from the Permian to Recent, and divided it into three families, the Notodariidae, Polymorphinidae, and Glandulinidae.

Loeblich and Tappan in 1988 removed Nodosariacea from Rotaliina and combined it with the newly established Robuloidacea to form the order Lagenina. The number of families was also increased within Nodosariacea to six with the addition of the Lagenidae, Ellipsolagenidae, and Vaginulinidae.
