= Fusulinoidea =

Scientific classification
- Domain: Eukaryota
- Supergroup: Rhizaria
- Phylum: Foraminifera
- Class: Globothalamea (?)
- Order: †Fusulinida
- Superfamily: †Fusulinoidea; Möller, 1878 nom. transl. Ciry, 1952

Synonyms
- Fusulinacea

Superfamily of single-celled organisms

The Fusulinoidea is a superfamily in the Fusulinida in which the test is spherical, discoida, or fusiform; commonly coiled, less often uncoiling in the late stage, numerous chambers per whorl; test wall of microgranular calcite (as for the order) in one to four layers. Tunnels or secondary foramina may result from partial resorption and secondary deposition may produce chomata, parachomata, tectoria, and axial fillings. Range: M Devonian (Givetian) – U Permian (Djulfian )

== Families ==
The Fusulinoidea, as revised in Loeblich and Tappan, 1988, includes 7 families, 27 subfamilies, and 164 genera. The families are:

- Loeblichidae
- Ozawainellidae
- Fusulinidae
- Schwagerinidae
- Staffelllidae
- Verbeekinidae
- Neoschwageriidae—listed according to the reference.
