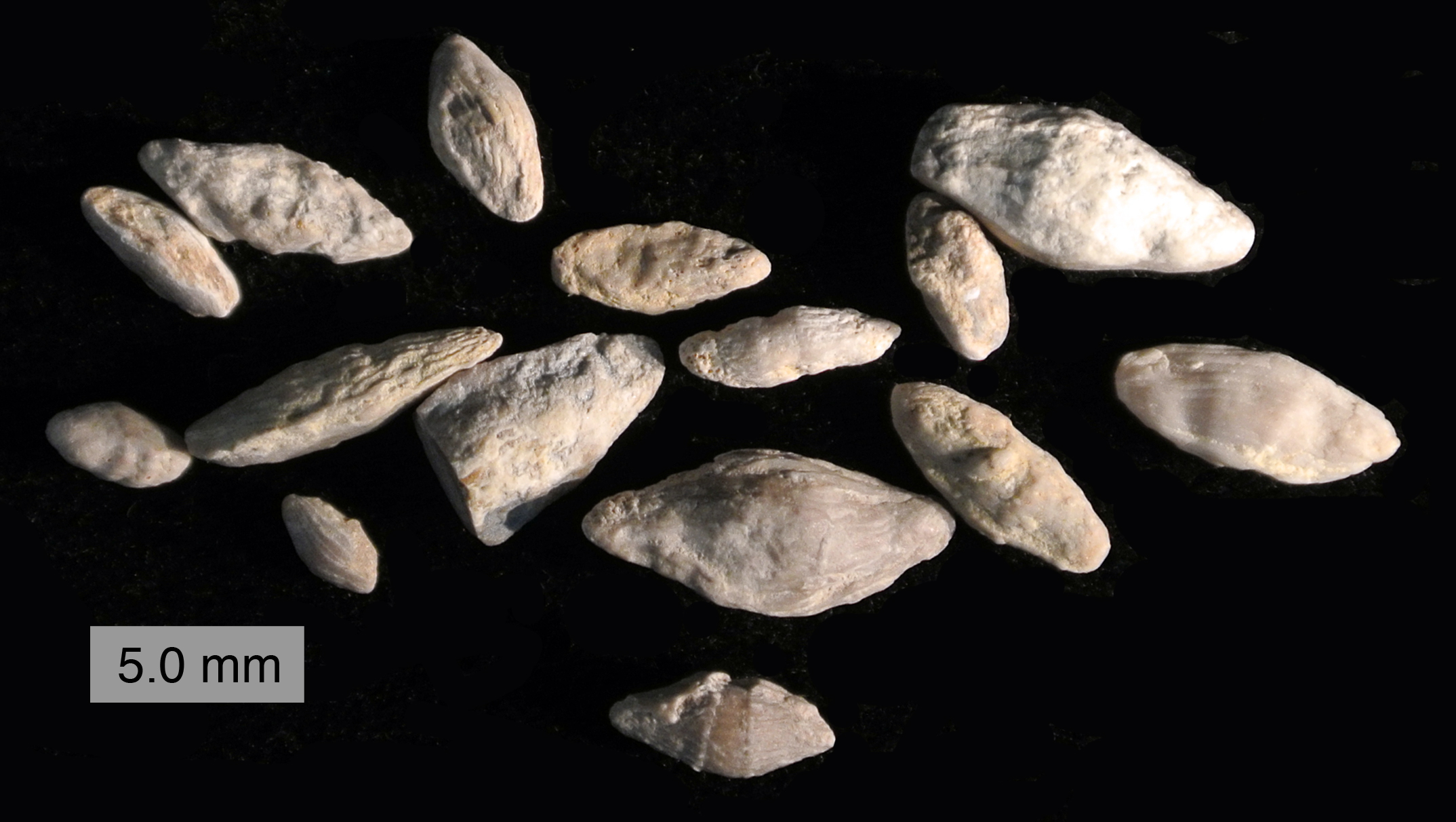

Scientific classification
- Domain: Eukaryota
- Clade: Sar
- Clade: Rhizaria
- Phylum: Retaria
- Subphylum: Foraminifera
- Class: Globothalamea (?)
- Order: †Fusulinida; Fursenko, 1958

Superfamilies
- Archaediscoidea; Colanielloidea; Earlandioidea; Endothyroidea; Fusulinoidea; Geinitzinoidea; Moravamminoidea; Nodosinelloidea; Palaeotextularioidea; Parathuramminoidea; Ptychocladioidea; Tetrataxoidea; Tournayelloidea

= Fusulinida =

Fusulinida Temporal range: Lower Pennsylvanian–Upper Permian

Extinct order of single-celled organisms

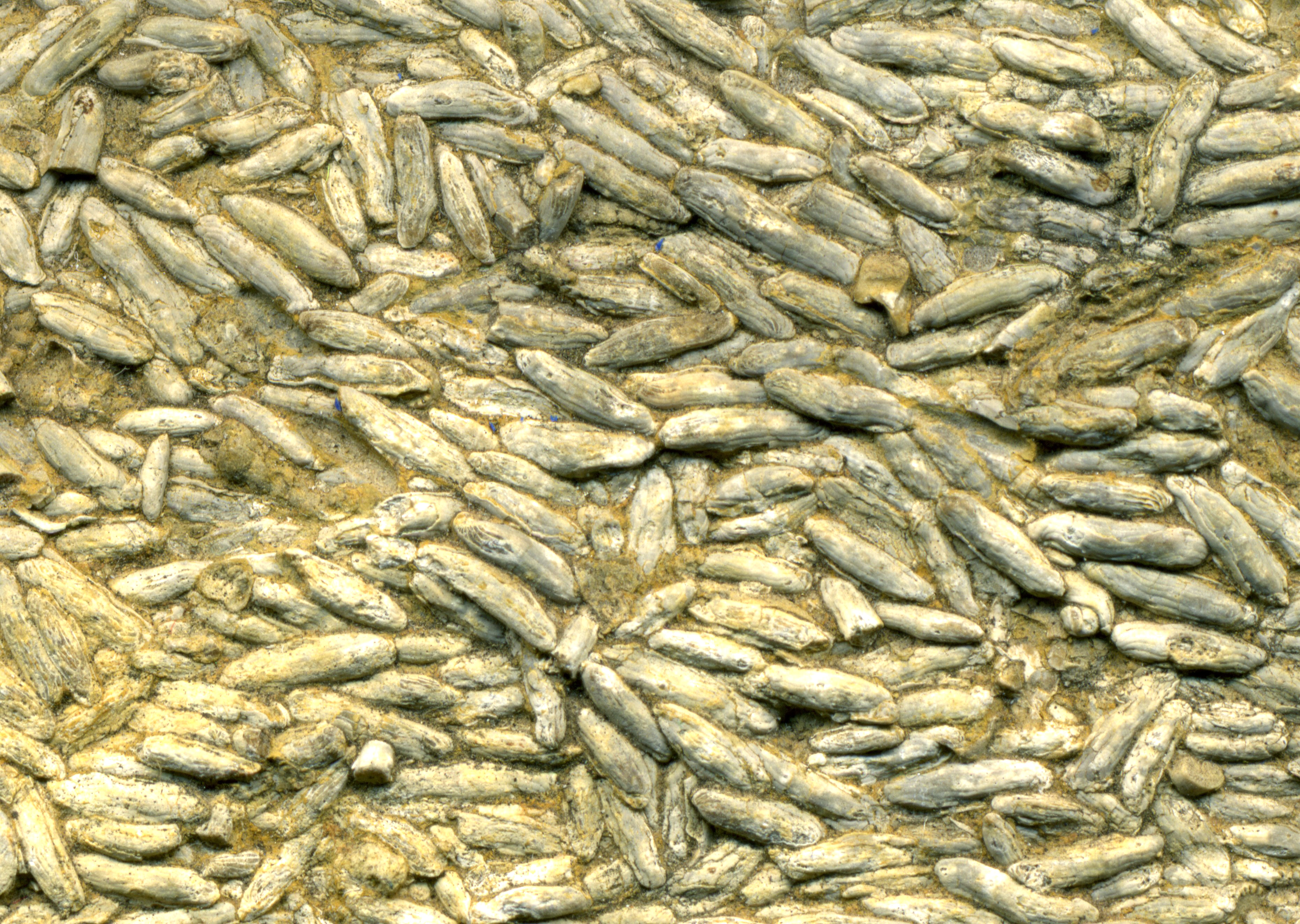
Fusulinid limestone, Upper Pennsylvanian; Elk County, Kansas. Field of view is 3.9 cm wide. Link at source to view of entire slab.

The Fusulinida is an extinct order within the Foraminifera in which the tests are traditionally considered to have been composed of microgranular calcite. Like all forams, they were single-celled organisms. In advanced forms the test wall was differentiated into two or more layers. Loeblich and Tappan, 1988, gives a range from the Lower Silurian to the Upper Permian, with the fusulinid foraminifera going extinct with the Permian–Triassic extinction event. While the latter is true, a more supported projected timespan is from the Mid-Carboniferous period.

== Taxonomy ==
Thirteen superfamilies are presently recognised, based on taxa (families) included in the three superfamilies given in the Treatise. Three are based on families in the Parathuramminoidea, 1964, and nine families in the Endothyroidea, 1964. The Fusulinoidea remains the same in both sources (Treatise 1964 and Loeblich and Tappan, 1988).

The term fusulinata has traditionally been used to refer to all palaeozoic foraminifera with multi-chambered tests. However, recent studies based on test microstructure have suggested that fusulinids may be polyphyletic and consist of at least three distinct lineages, and as such are in need of systematic revision.

== Test composition ==
Traditionally, fusulinid tests were considered to have been composed of very small, tightly-packed calcite crystals with no preferred orientation—a so-called microgranular structure. However. a 2017 study using scanning electron microscopy revealed that this supposed structure actually represented tests that had been extensively modified by diagenetic processes. Instead, living fusulinids had low-magnesium hyaline tests with spherical nanograins up to 100 nm across, similar to the tests of the Rotaliida. These factors combined with overall shape of the test led these authors to suggest classification of the fusulinids with the Globothalamea.

A 2021 study further examined test microstructure and suggested instead that the forams examined in the 2017 study were not true fusulinids, but rather considered them their own group containing Nanicella and relatives. These authors considers that true fusulinids did in fact have microgranular tests. A third group consisting of forms related to Semitextularia was also found to have a distinct test microstructure, and was suggested to be a third lineage.

== Evolutionary history ==
The fusulinids are among the earliest calcareous-walled foraminifera; they appear in the fossil record during the Llandoverian epoch of the early Silurian. The earliest of these were microscopic, planispirally coiled, and evolute; later forms evolved a diversity of shapes including lenticular, globular, and elongated rice-shaped forms.

Later species of fusulinids grew to much larger size, with some forms reaching 5 cm in length; reportedly, some specimens reach up to 14 cm in length, making them among the largest foraminifera extant or extinct. Fusulinids are the earliest lineage of foraminifera thought to have evolved symbiosis with photosynthetic organisms.

Fossils of fusulinids have been found on all continents except Antarctica; they reached their greatest diversity during the Visean epoch of the Carboniferous. The group then gradually declined in diversity until finally going extinct during the Permo-Triassic extinction event.

== Terminology ==
The term "fusulinid" applies to any of the Fusulinida. The Fusulinida are fusulinids (sensu lato). However, the term "fusulinid" is often applied just to the fusiform Fusulinoidea and not to the entire order.

== Application ==
Members, especially of the Fusulinoidea, are excellent index fossils for determining ages and correlating Upper Mississippian to Permian strata. In some places fusulinoideans may be so abundant as to be a significant component of limestone.

== See also ==
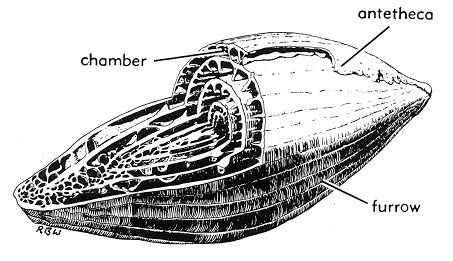
Cutaway view of a representative fusulinid

- List of prehistoric foraminifera genera
