= Volcanic and igneous plumbing systems =

Magma chambers

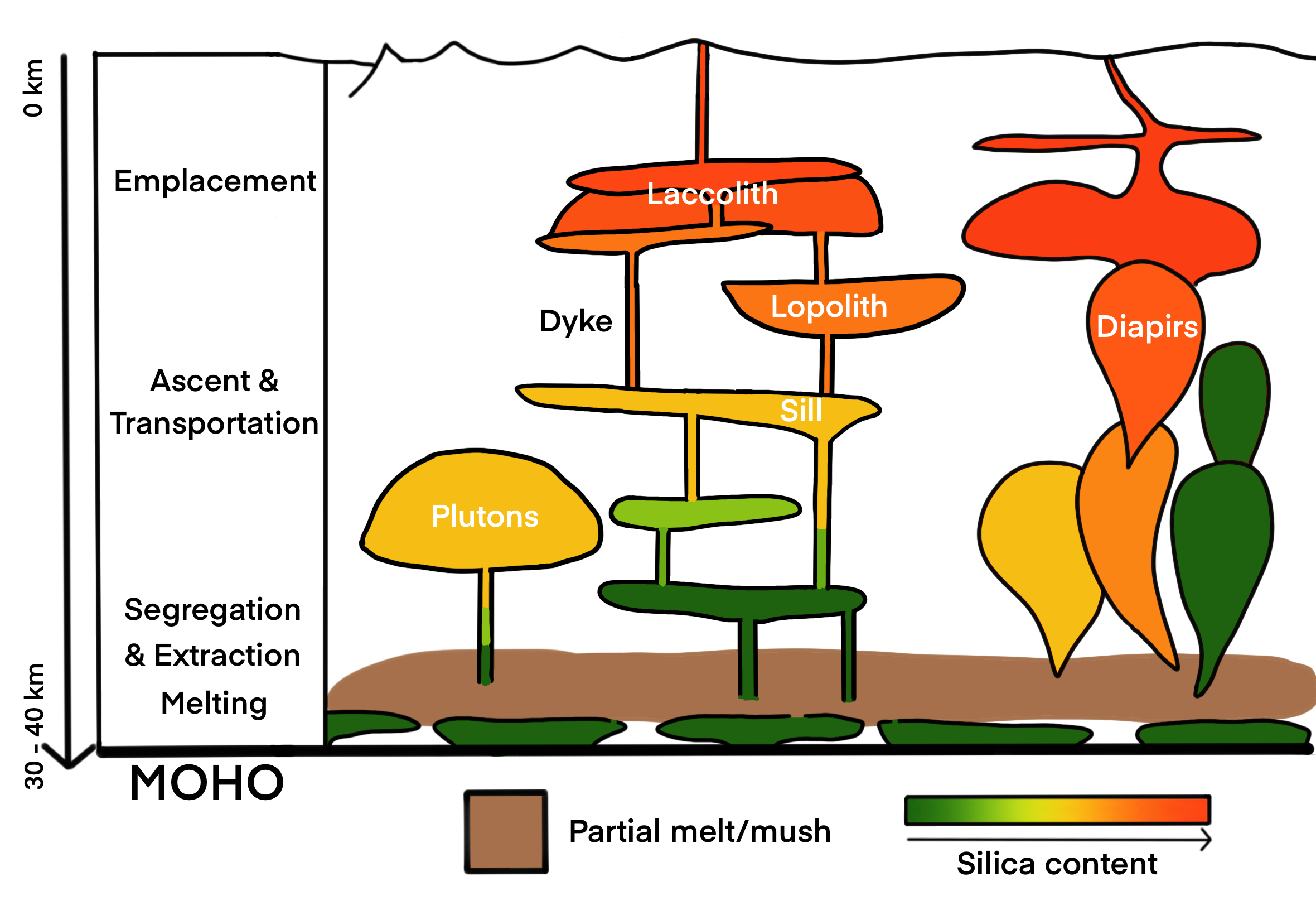
Schematic sketch of the volcanic and igneous plumbing systems (after Burchardt, 2018).

Volcanic and igneous plumbing systems (VIPS) consist of interconnected magma channels and chambers through which magma flows and is stored within Earth's crust. Volcanic plumbing systems can be found in all active tectonic settings, such as mid-oceanic ridges, subduction zones, and mantle plumes, when magmas generated in continental lithosphere, oceanic lithosphere, and in the sub-lithospheric mantle are transported. Magma is first generated by partial melting, followed by segregation and extraction from the source rock to separate the melt from the solid. As magma propagates upwards, a self-organised network of magma channels develops, transporting the melt from lower crust to upper regions. Channelled ascent mechanisms include the formation of dykes and ductile fractures that transport the melt in conduits. For bulk transportation, diapirs carry a large volume of melt and ascent through the crust. When magma stops ascending, or when magma supply stops, magma emplacement occurs. Different mechanisms of emplacement result in different structures, including plutons, sills, laccoliths and lopoliths.

== Magma production ==
=== Partial melting ===
Partial melting is the first step for generating magma and magma is the basis of VIPS. After magma is generated, it will travel across the crust and lead to the formation of magma conduits and chambers. In continental crust, partial melting occurs when a portion of the solid rock melts into felsic magma. Rocks in the lower crust and the upper mantle are subject to partial melting. The rate of partial melting and the resultant silicate melt composition depend on temperature, pressure, flux addition (water, volatiles) and the source rock composition. In oceanic crust, decompression melting of mantle materials forms basaltic magma. When the mantle materials rise, the pressure greatly decreases which significantly lowers the melting point of the rock.

== Melt segregation and extraction ==
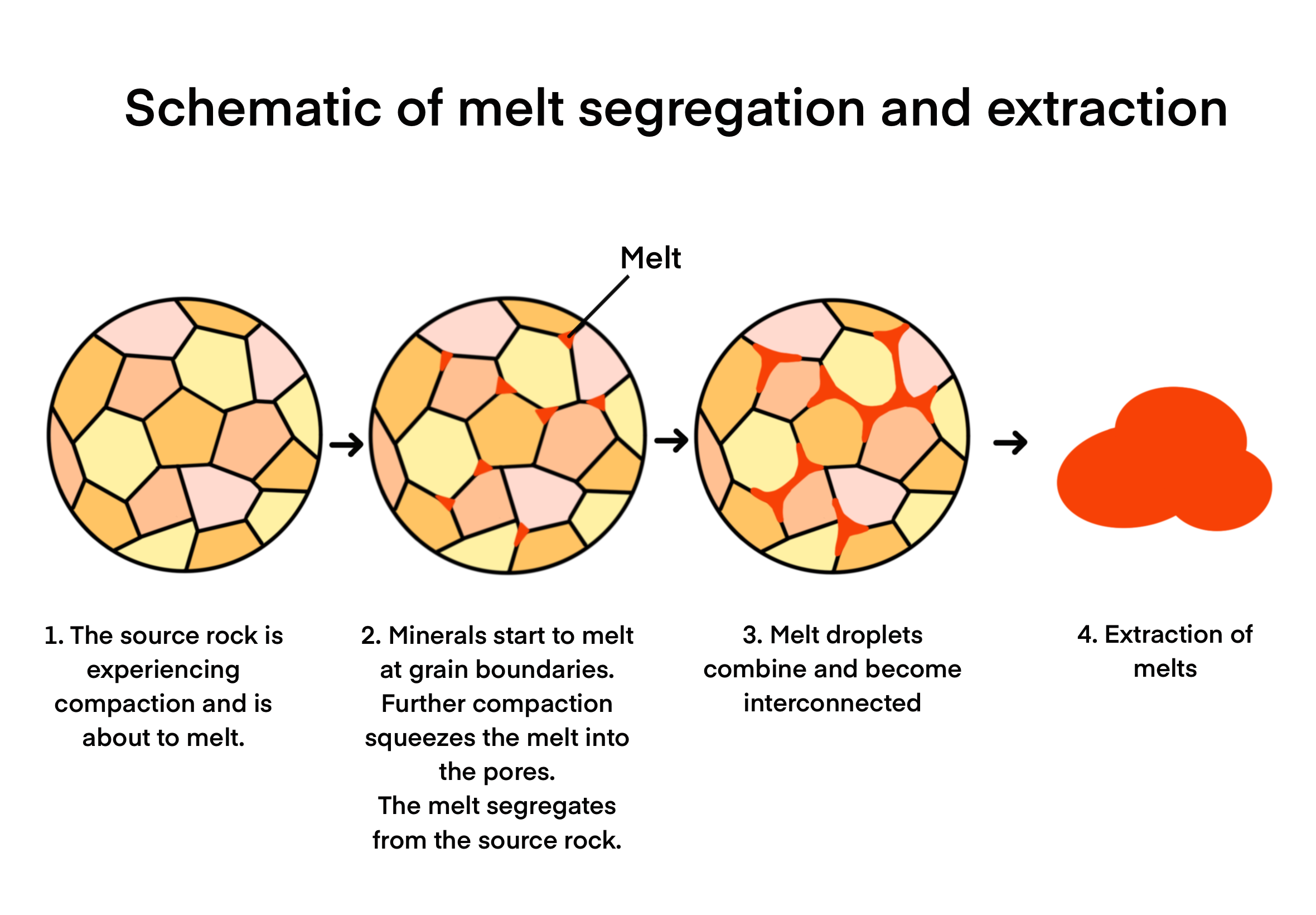
Microscopic view of melt segregation and extraction. When the source rock experiences compaction, minerals start to melt at grain boundaries. Melt droplets then build up and connect into melt pools until they are being extracted.

After magma is generated, magma will migrate out of its source region by the process of magma segregation and extraction. These processes define the resulting composition of the magma. Depending on the efficiency of the segregation and extraction, there will be different structures of the volcanic and igneous plumbing systems.

=== Segregation ===
Melt segregation is the process of melt separating from its source rock. After the silica-rich melt is generated by partial melting, melt segregation is achieved by the gravitational compaction of the source rock. It causes the squeezing of the melt through the pores and the melts are produced at grain boundaries. When the melt droplets continue to build up and the proportion of melt continues to increase, they tend to gather together as melt pools. The interconnectivity of the melt determines whether and when melt may be extracted. When the melt percentage in the source rock approaches the first percolation threshold at 7%, the melt starts to migrate. At this point, 80% of the grain boundaries are melted and the rock becomes very weak. As melting advances and the melt continues to accumulate, it reaches the second percolation threshold at a melt percentage of 26% to 30%. The matrix of the source rock will start to break down and the melt will start to be extracted.

=== Extraction ===
After the melt segregates from the solid, melt extraction takes place. The rate of magma extraction depends on the spatial distribution and interconnectivity of the magma channel network developed out of its source rock. There are two end members of melt extraction: melt can be extracted in pulses if the development of magma channels are rapid and the network is highly interconnected, or melt can be constantly drained from the source if the magma channels are developed in a continuous and steady manner.

Also, magma extraction controls the chemical composition of the melt, the amount of magma transported by dykes, and consequently, the volume flux of magma into plutons. These will eventually control the overall structure of the VIPS such as the formation of dykes and plutons.

For instance, if the magma channels are not well connected, the source may not be drained successfully, and dykes may freeze before propagating far enough to feed plutons. If the source rock could not initiate dyke ascent with sufficient melt, the source rock may remain undrained, favouring diapiric ascent of the source rock.

== Magma ascent and transportation ==
When there is sufficient melt accumulation, the magma in the source will migrate from the source to the shallower level of the crust through magma conduits to feed and form different magma reservoirs and structures in VIPS. The buoyancy of magma is the main driving force of all types of transportation mechanism.

=== Diapirism ===
A diapir forms when a blob of buoyant, hot, and ductile magma ascends to a higher lithospheric layer. Diapirism is considered as the main mechanism of magma transport in lower to middle crust and it is one of the viable transportation mechanisms for both felsic and mafic magmas.

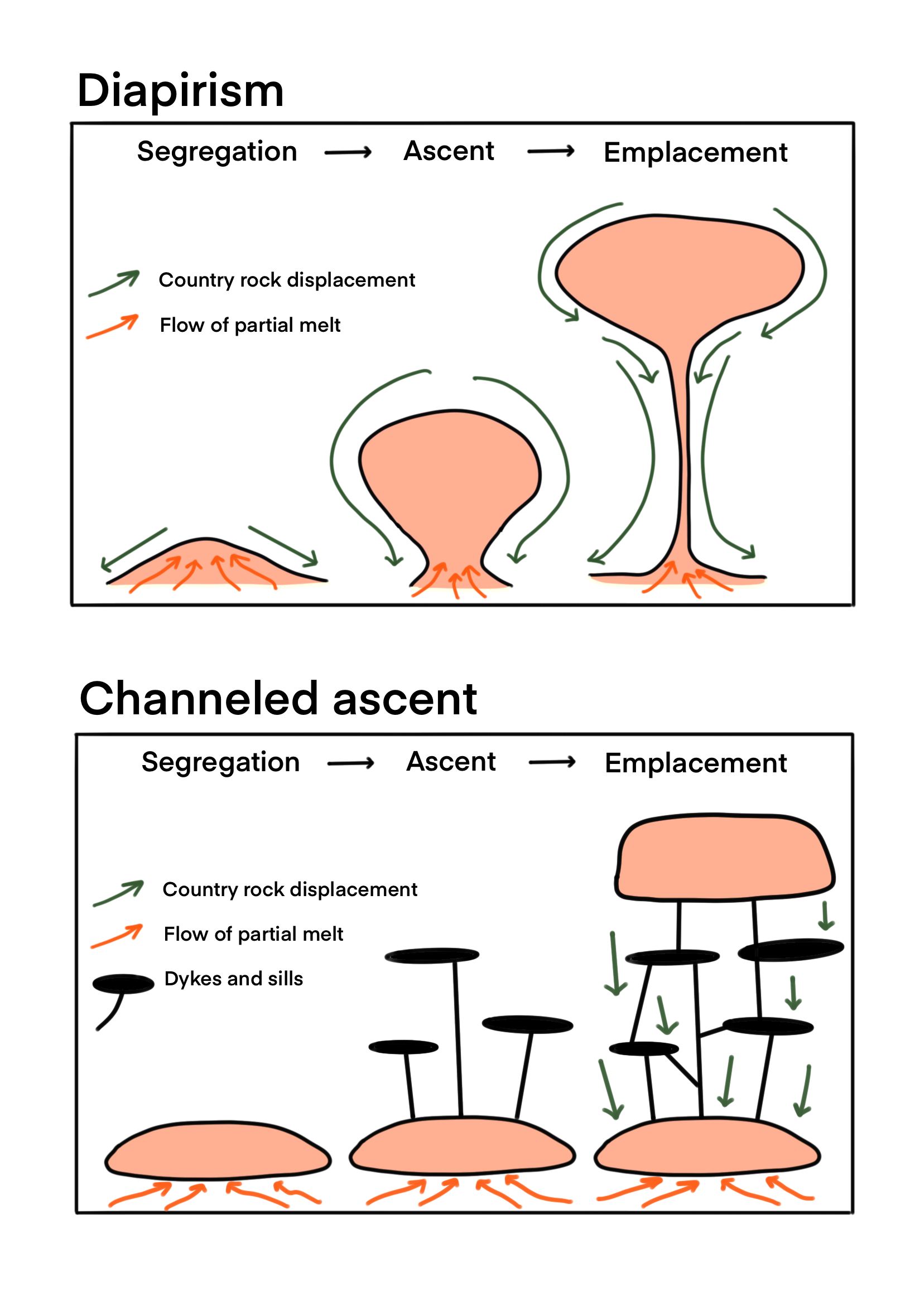
End members of magma segregation, ascent, and displacement: Diapirism and Channeled ascent (after Cruden, 2018). Diapirs transport melt in a large batch of magma and emplace as plutons. Transport channels transports melt in a fracture network and emplace as dykes and sills.

The process of diapirism only begins when there is sufficient volume of melt accumulated in the source region. When a blob of melt is generated in the source region and it is about to ascend, the distortion causes periodic Rayleigh-Taylor instabilities at the interface of the melt and the surrounding country rock as a result of density difference. As the melt is less dense than the surrounding rock, Rayleigh-Taylor instabilities will grow and amplify, and eventually become diapirs.

Numerical models and laboratory experiments demonstrate that if the upwelling melt is less viscous than the surrounding country rock, a spherical shaped diapir connected to a stalk will be formed, which is called Stokes diapir. Stoke diapirism is a viable mechanism preferably for the ascent of massive magma bodies in a weak and ductile crust. Small diapirs are likely to freeze in the middle of the ascent due to heat loss and solidification.

Recent studies demonstrated that a dyke-diapir hybrid model may be a more realistic mechanism of diapir formation. The numerical simulation of dyke-diapir pair shows that a pseudo-dyke zone may develop at the top of the diapir as it propagates, which is essential for softening the roof rocks and allowing the diapir to ascend. It also demonstrates that episodic injection of magma is crucial in maintaining the temperature of the diapir system and preventing it from freezing.

Diapirs can also be categorised into crustal and mantle diapirs. Crustal diapirs accents from the lower crust due to partial melting. On the other hand, mantle diapir forms in the mantle, and eventually ascends across the MOHO or underplate the lower crust to provide heat for partial melting.

=== Channeled ascent ===
==== Dykes ====
Dykes are vertical to sub-vertical fractures filled with magma that cut through layers, and they connect the source rock to magma chamber, sills and may eventually reach the surface.

The transportation of magma in dyke is caused by the buoyancy of magma, and also the reservoir pressure if it is connected to the source rock. Dykes transport magma at a higher velocity than diapirs because dykes are usually in an extended network of narrow channels which have a large surface area. However, the large surface area implies that magma crystallization is easier to occur. Therefore, some dykes may rise to the surface, but the majority of them terminates at depth because of solidification of a blockage of rigid layer.

There are two types of dyke, including regional dyke swarms which originate from a deep magma source, and local sheet swarms which originate from a shallow magma reservoir. Regional dyke swarms are usually elongated where local sheet swarms are inclined and circular, also known as ring dykes.

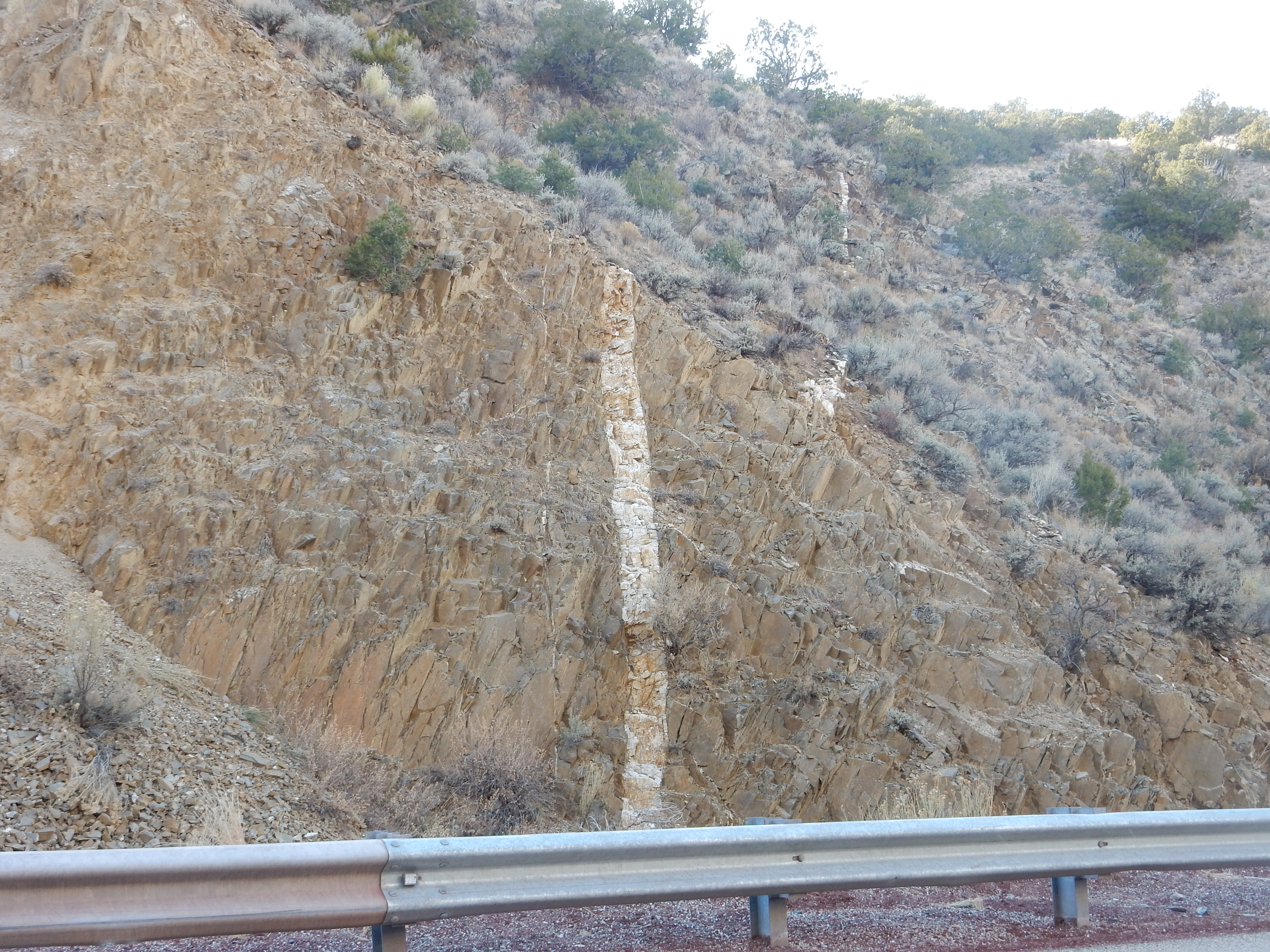
Pegmatite dyke intruding quartzite in Marquenas Formation, New Mexico, United States

The geometry of the dyke is related to the stress field and the distribution of pre-existing faults and joints in the country rock. Therefore, an extensional tectonic setting favours the formation of dykes.

Table 1: Geometry of dykes
| Feature | Description |
|---|---|
| Shape | Dykes are in sheet-like and planar shape. Thick dykes are usually straight, but most dykes are sinuous. |
| Length and thickness | Dykes are very thin when comparing to their length. Some megadykes can be 500 to 1000 km long, and some can be 100 to 200 m thick. |
| Segmentation | Dykes may exhibit non-systematic segmentation, but they were originally continuous.They often show some degrees of lateral or vertical offset, and the offset parts are often connected by thin veins if they are close to each other. Some dyke segments are arranged as en echelon, but random segmentation is more common. |

==== Ductile fractures ====
Ductile fractures are formed by rock creep in which the ductile recrystallisation produces tiny voids that connect and eventually fracture the rock. Ductile fractures can be found in the deeper crust, as the mode of deformation transforms from brittle to ductile. Ductile fractures are associated with magma conduits in the deeper region of the crust.

==== Faults and shears ====
Fault and shear zones act as lines of weakness for magma to flow in and transport to upper levels. Regional deformation may result in the three main types of faults including normal faults, reverse faults, and strike-slip faults. Particularly, a transpressional fault that cuts through layers is related to the transportation and ascent of magma by creating space for emplacement.

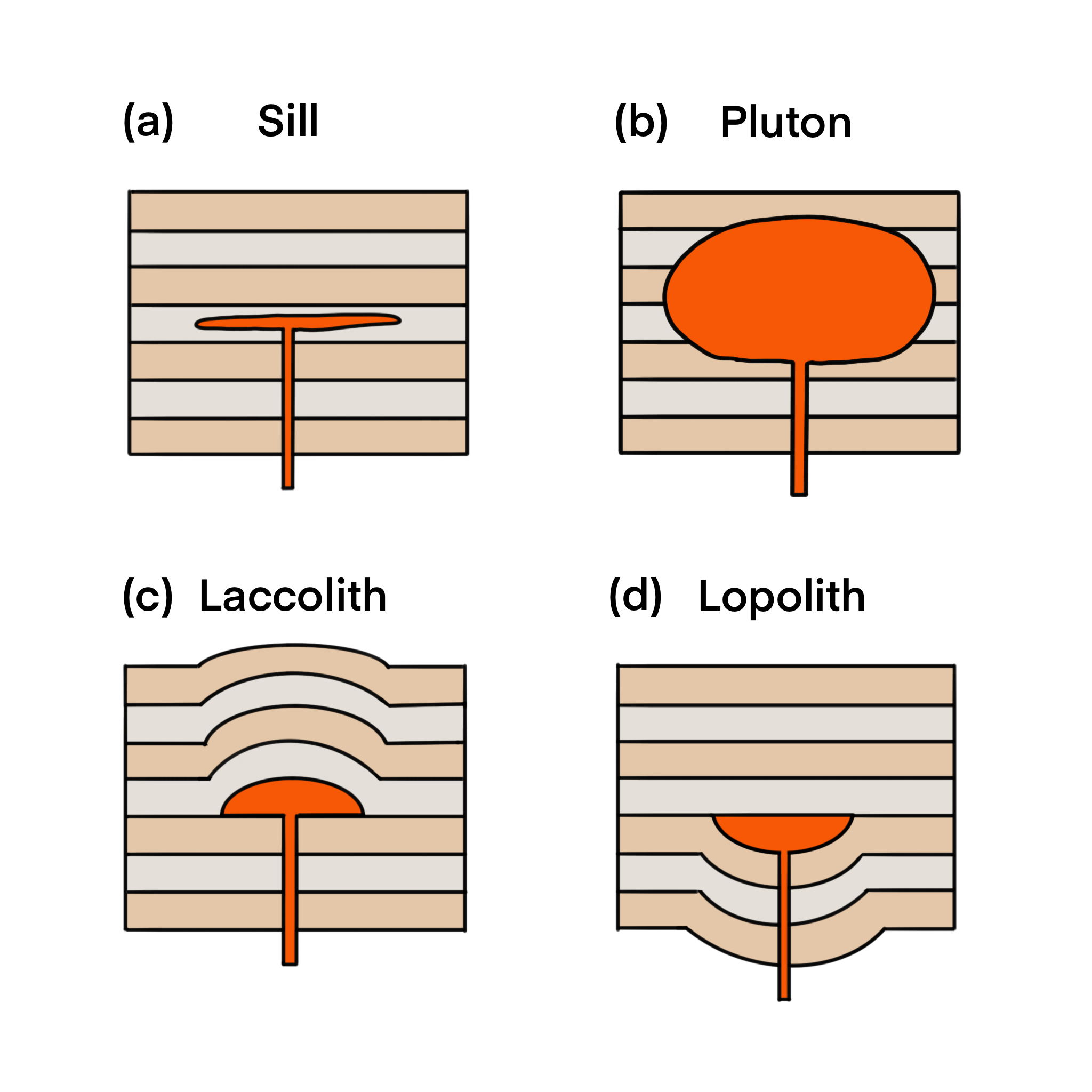
Shape of different magma emplacement structures: (a)sill, (b) pluton, (c) laccolith and (d) lopolith. Sills are tabular sheet intrusions. Plutons are large, thick tabular bodies. Laccoliths are dome-shaped structures with elevate roofs and flat floors. Lopoliths are lenticular structures with flat roofs and depressed floors.

== Magma emplacement ==
When magma stops ascending, the freezing of magma bodies or the arrest of magma supply lead to the formation of magma reservoirs. Magma emplacement can take place at any depth above the source rock. Magma emplacement is primarily controlled by the internal forces of magma including buoyancy and magma pressure. Magma pressure changes with depth as vertical stress is a function of the depth. Another parameter of magma emplacement is the rate of magma supply. From field evidence, the formation of plutons involves multiple stages of magma injection instead of a single pulse. Small batches of magma will accumulate incrementally for several million years until the magma supply ceases.

According to the depth of formation and geometry, magma emplacement can be classified into plutons, sills, laccoliths and lopoliths.

=== Middle to lower crust ===
==== Plutons ====
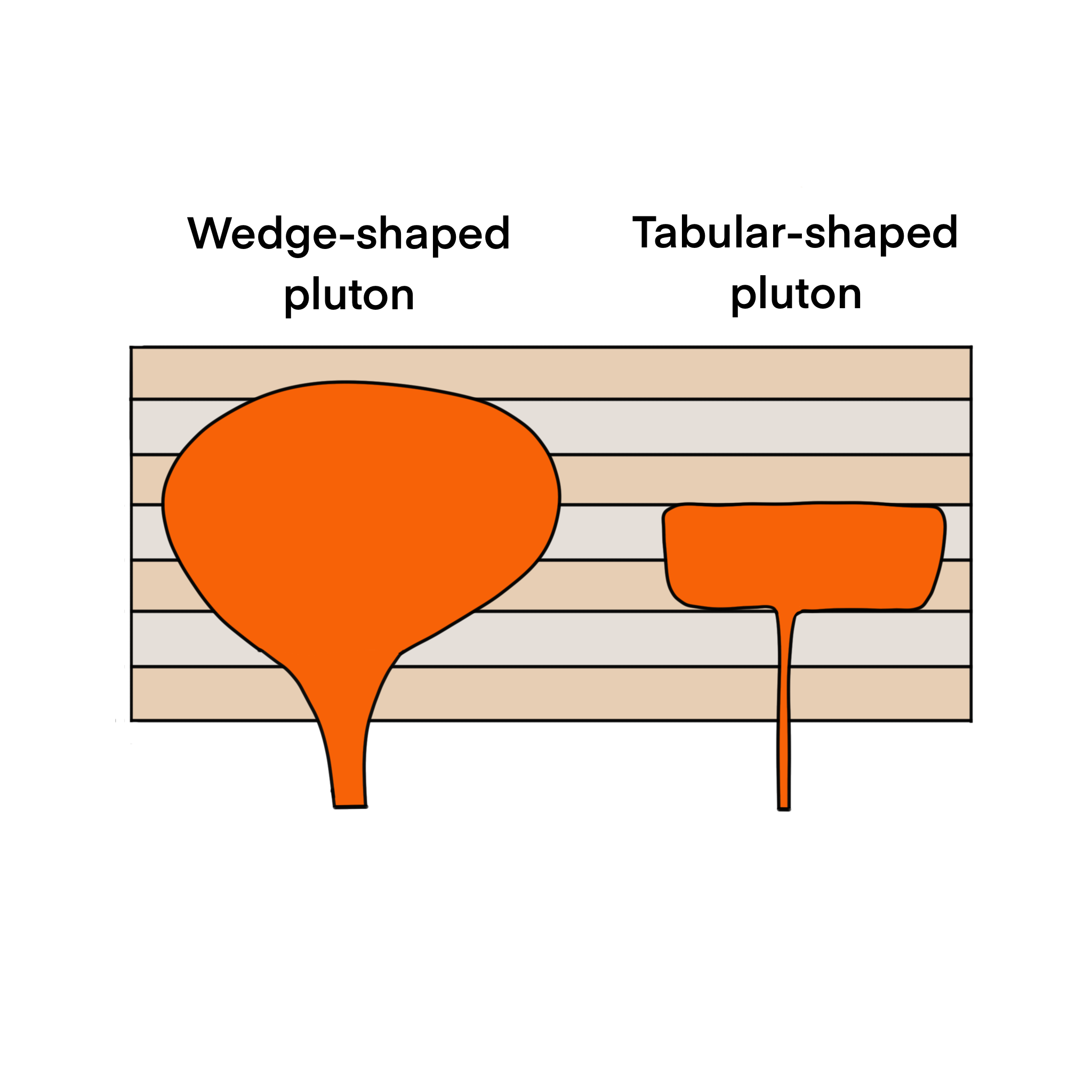
Classification of plutons depending on the geometry of pluton floor. Wedge-shaped plutons are circular to elliptical in shape, whereas tablet-shaped plutons are in disc-shape.

Magma bodies emplaced in lower crust can be classified as plutons. They are tabular bodies with a larger thickness than its length. It implies that at the level of emplacement, magma mainly flows horizontally. The thicknesses of pluton ranges from one kilometres to about tens of kilometres. And it takes about 0.1 Ma to 6 Ma for plutons to be constructed in multiple magma pulses.

The growth of plutons in different environments can be a function of the country rock characteristics and the depth of emplacement. From field evidence, when plutons are formed in a ductile environment, it will displace the surrounding rocks both laterally and vertically. However, for brittle environments, as there is no evidence for strain in the lateral margins, plutons must be displaced in a vertical manner. Therefore, the chances of lateral displacement decrease with decreasing ductility of country rocks.

Plutons can be categorised into two types depending on the geometry of the pluton floor. They are called wedged-shape plutons and tablet-shaped plutons. Wedge-shaped plutons typically have irregular shapes. They may have roots that tapers downwards which eventually become cylindrical-shaped feeder structures which cause the floors to dip inward at different angles. Tablet-shaped plutons have parallel pluton floors and roofs, and steeper sides compared to wedge-shaped plutons. Some plutons may exhibit features of the two types.

Table 2: Comparison of wedge-shaped and tablet-shaped plutons
| Type of pluton | Wedge-shaped pluton | Tablet-shaped pluton |
|---|---|---|
| Shape | Irregular, circular to elliptical shape | Disc-shape |
| Roof and floor relationship | Non-parallel | Almost parallel to parallel |
| Pluton sides | Can be gentle or steep depending on the development of the root | Steep sides |

=== Middle to upper crust ===
==== Sills ====
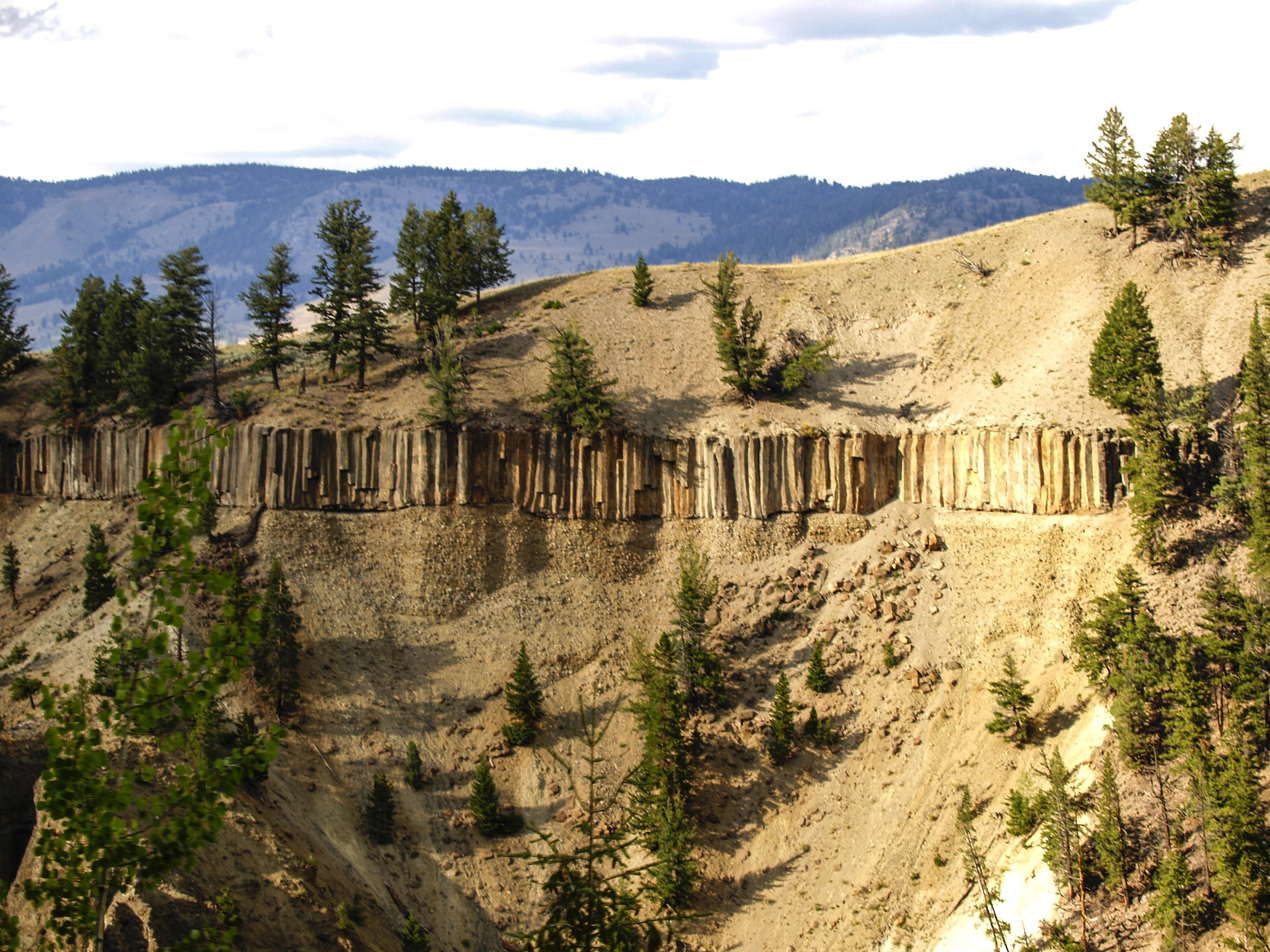
Sill intrusion in Yellowstone National Park.

Sills are generally defined as sheet intrusions which are tabular in shape and dominantly concordant to the surrounding rock layers. They are commonly emplaced within three kilometres below the Earth surface. Most sills are sub-horizontal in shape as they are usually found in sedimentary layers. However, in some cases, sills may deform sedimentary layers and exhibit other geometries such as inclined or sub-vertical shapes. The length of sill can extend up to tens of kilometres.

Depending to its shape and concordance to the country rock, sills can be classified into five different types based on field evidence. They are strata-concordant sills, transgressive sills, step-wise transgressive sills, saucer-shaped sills, V-shaped sills, and hybrid sills. Strata-concordant sills are the classic representation of a sill. They develop continuously and concordantly with the host rock and are often found in deeper part of the upper crust. Transgressive sills cut through and propagate to higher layers with an oblique angle to the host rock, displaying discordant properties. It is straighter in shape. Step-wise transgressive sills are similar to transgressive sills, but there are alternating concordant and discordant segments, producing step-like features. Saucer-shaped sills have a lower central concordant sill, and two higher outer transgressive sills that flatten out at the tips. They usually have a thicker inner sill and thinning outwards. V-shaped sills are somewhat similar to saucer-shaped sills, but it has a shorter inner part. Hybrid sills shows mixed features of the above-mentioned sills.

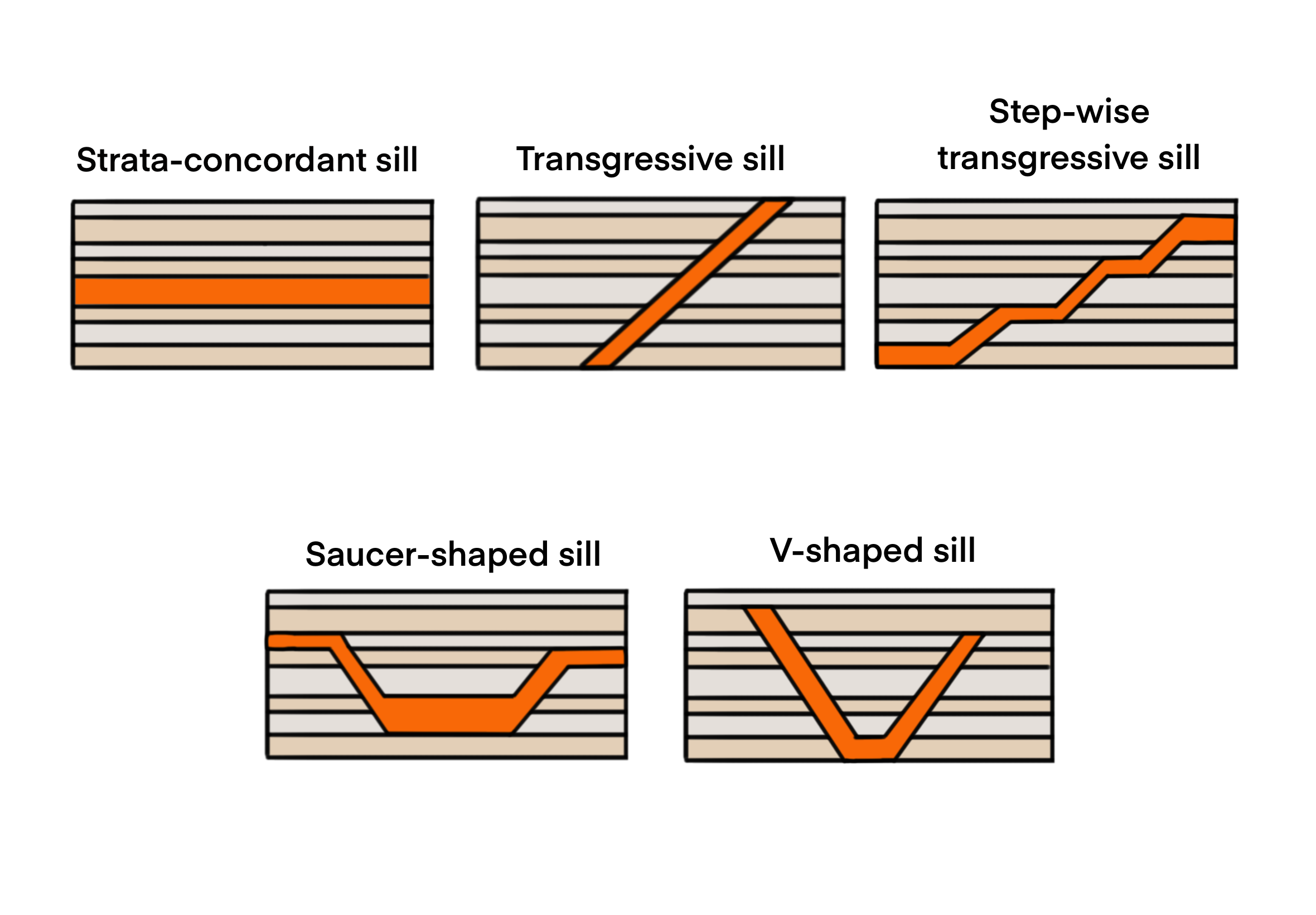
Different geometry of sills (After Galland et al., 2018). They can be concordant (parallel to layers), discordant (cutting across layers), or a mix of two.

Table 3: Comparison of different shapes of sills
| Type of sill | Strata-concordant sills | Transgressive sills | Step-wise transgressive sills | Saucer-shaped sills | V-shaped sills |
|---|---|---|---|---|---|
| Shape | Sub-horizontal to horizontal elongate shape | Inclined elongated shape | Stair-stepping shape | Concave-up shape: Inner sill horizontal, with two inclined outer sills that flatten out at the tips | V-shaped: Inner sill horizontal (but limited in extent) with two inclined outer sills |
| Concordant (Parallel to layers) or discordant (Cutting across layers) | Concordant | Discordant | Concordant and discordant | Inner-part concordant, outer-part transgressive, tips concordant | Inner-part concordant, outer-part transgressive |

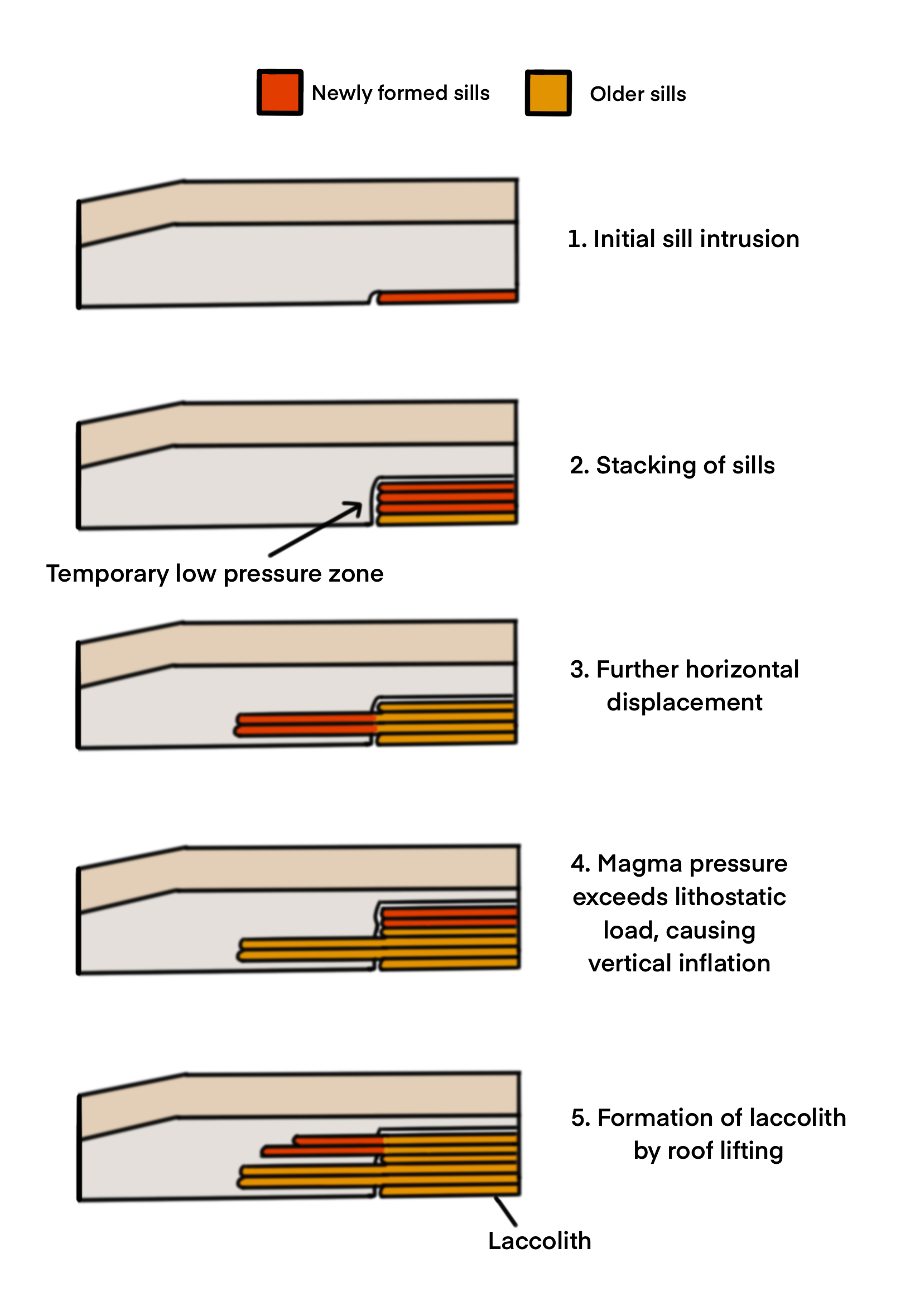
Formation of a laccolith (After Morgan, 2018). The joints in the country rock allow sills to intrude, stack on top of each other, and eventually lead to vertical inflation and roof lifting, forming laccoliths.

==== Laccoliths ====
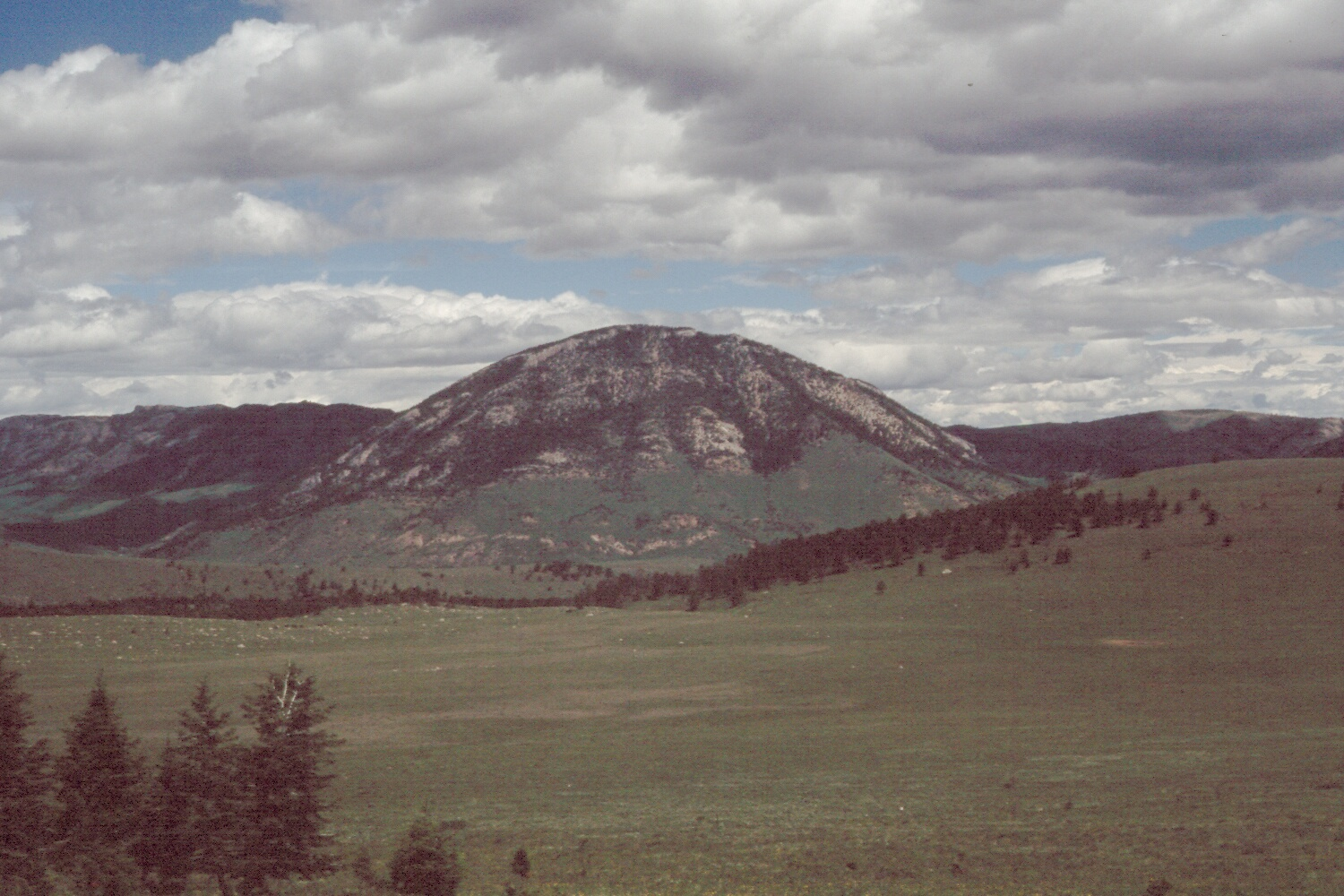
Laccolith in Limestone Butte, Montana

Laccoliths forms from the stacking of sills. They typically display dome-shaped structures with slightly elevated roofs and flat floors that are concordant to rock layers. They are formed at depths that do not exceed three kilometres. It typically takes 100 to 100,000 years for enough magma to emplace as sills, and the grouping of sills form laccoliths.

The formation of laccolith is governed by the jointing and faulting of the country rocks when emplacement begins. These lines of weakness provide pathways for the formation of initial sill-like structures that are horizontal in shape. At this stage, sheet intrusion is a more favourable mechanism of emplacement because the margins of the sheet cool faster, which creates shear zones that allow further horizontal displacement. After some time, when the cooling rate decreases, and when the sills continue to stack onto one another, sheet intrusion is no longer a favourable mechanism because the zones of weakness diminish. The cohesion between the sedimentary layers is also reducing because of displacement and deformation of the rock. Here, inflation is a possible mechanism to continue the growth of intrusion. If, at this point, the surface area of the magma is large enough to generate a magma force that can overcome the lithostatic load of the overlying layer, vertical inflation can take place. The vertical inflation of magma chambers creates laccoliths.

==== Lopoliths ====
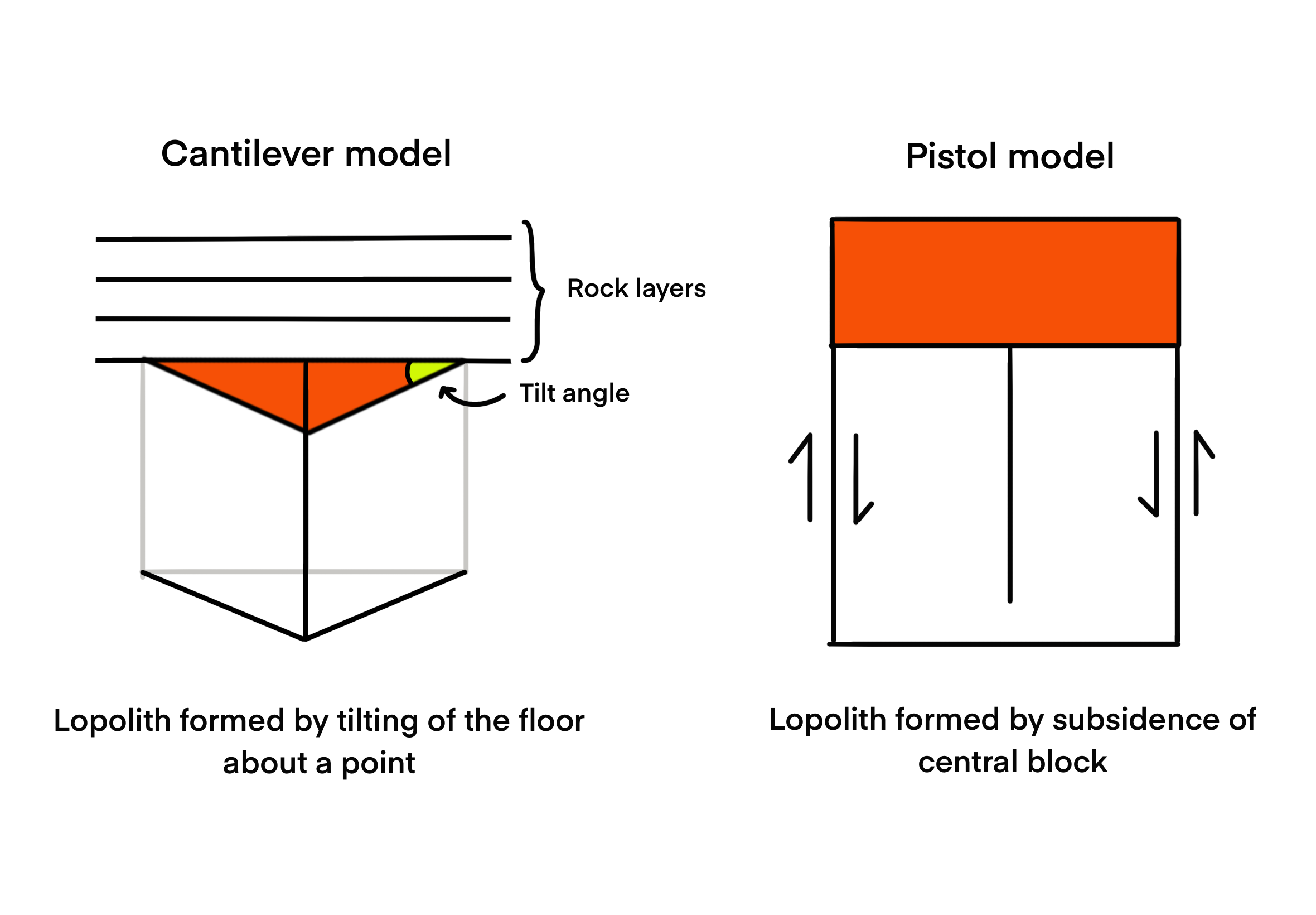
Two models of lopolith formation: the cantilevel model and the pistol model (After Cruden & Weinberg, 2018). In the Cantilever model, lopoliths form by tilting of the floor. In the Pistol model, lopoliths form.by vertical subsidence of the floor.

Lopoliths are lenticular concordant intrusive masses that display a convex-down shape. It typically involves floor depression. Two models were proposed for the formation of lopoliths. They are the cantilever model and the piston model. The cantilever model describes the formation of the lopoliths as a result of the tilting of floor about a point at the pluton margin. It deforms the underlying crust by simple shear and leads to the sinkage of partial melt. In the piston model, the formation of lopolith begins when the central block floor sinks. The floor continues to thicken and creates tabular-shaped lopoliths.

== See also ==
- Magma differentiation
- Igneous intrusion
- Igneous rock
- Igneous activity
