= Okavango Dyke Swarm =

Giant dyke swarm in northeast Botswana

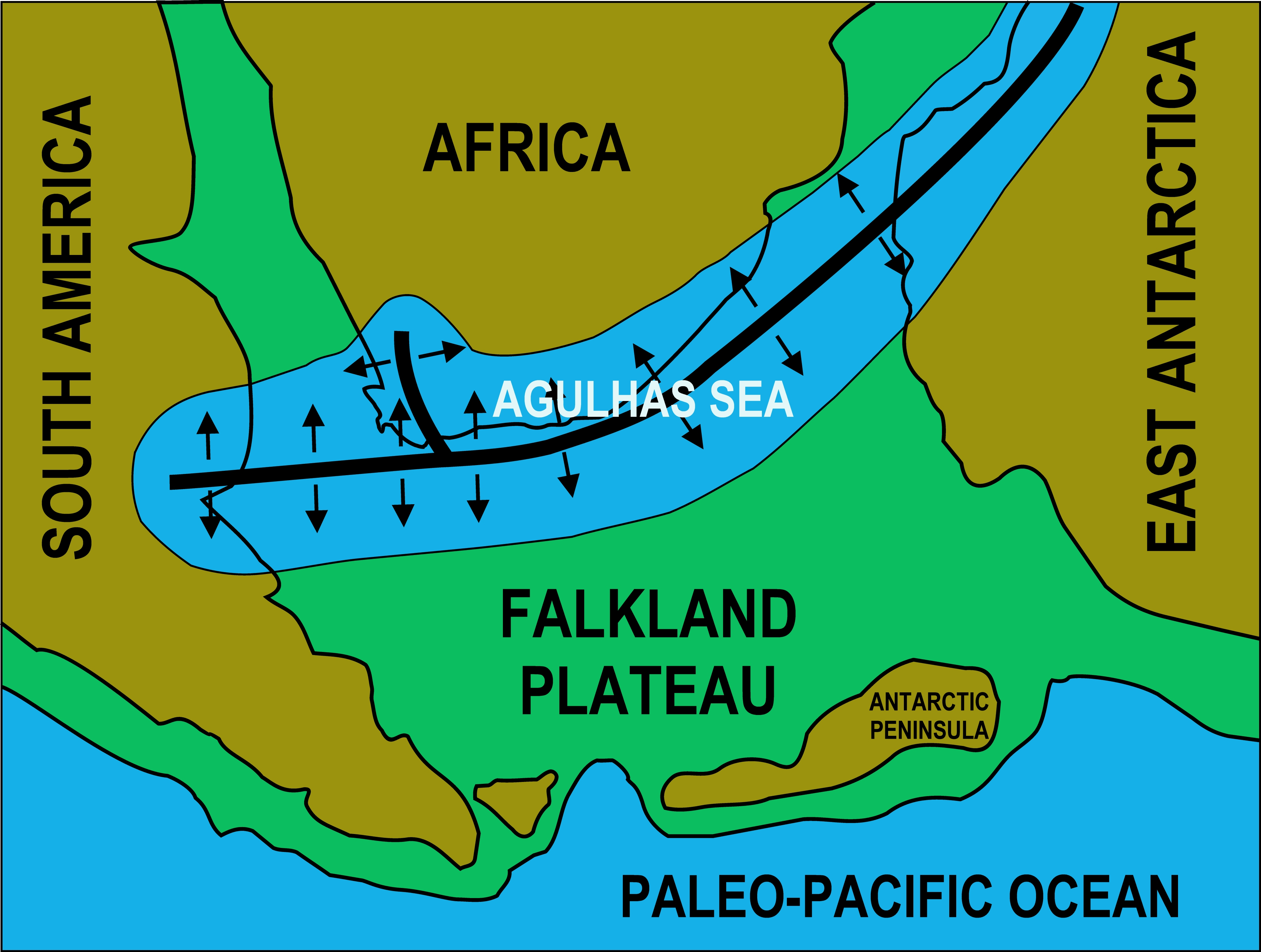
Major present-day continents were split from the Gondwana supercontinent. The breakup induced a dyke swarm.

The Okavango Dyke Swarm is a giant dyke swarm of the Karoo Large Igneous Province in northeast Botswana, southern Africa. It consists of a group of Proterozoic and Jurassic dykes, trending east-southeast across Botswana, spanning a region nearly 2,000 kilometres (1,200 mi) long and 110 kilometres (68 mi) wide. The Jurassic dykes were formed approximately 179 million years ago, composed of mainly tholeiitic mafic rocks. The formation is related to the magmatism at the Karoo triple junction, induced by the plate tectonic break up of the Gondwana supercontinent in the early Jurassic.

== Geological information ==
The Okavango Dyke Swarm overlaps with the Lebombo and Save-Limpopo Dyke Swarms at Karoo Triple junction, as a part of the Karoo Large Igneous Province. Intrusion of Okavango Dyke Swarm occurred in two distinct stages. Most of the dykes in the swarm are Karoo-age, and about 13% are Proterozoic age. The age range of Proterozoic components is 800–1600 Ma, while the dominant Karoo-age rocks are dated to 178–179 Ma. The mean dyke thickness is 17 metres (56 ft).

=== Geology of the country rock in Northeast Botswana ===
The dyke swarm cuts through Archean basement rock to the west in Shashe area, and Jurassic volcanic rocks and sedimentary sequences to the east in the Tuli Graben. The basement country rocks are Archean crystalline gneisses and granitoids of the Limpopo Belt. They were found to be deformed in the Paleoproterozoic period. The rock's fabrics show folding of a number of separate stages. They contain complex trending of shear zones and fracture networks. The overlying Jurassic volcanic rocks are mainly basaltic lava flows.

=== Karoo triple junction ===
Huge dyke swarms are formed in radial geometry. They include the N110° striking Okavango dyke swarm, the N70° striking Save-Limpopo Dyke Swarm, the Olifants River Dyke Swarm and the N-S Lebombo dyke swarm. The coverage of the area in northeast Botswana is called the Karoo Triple Junction.

Intrusive events and dyke swarm emplacement in Karoo Large Igneous Province occurred during 183–174 Ma in the Mesozoic era. Rocks produced by the Karoo triple junction are predominantly continental flood basalts, which are usually associated with huge magmatic events during the Phanerozoic eon. In the Karoo triple junction, rocks are dated to the 180 Ma Karoo magmatic event, which occurred due to the breakup of Gondwana and the opening of Indian Ocean. It consisted of mafic lava flow, dykes, and sills covering a paleo-surface of 3 million km^{2}.

Jurassic dykes found in the dyke swarms are mostly composed of dolerite, containing clinopyroxene, plagioclase, and olivine. Grain size is from fine to medium. Fresh mineral alteration has occurred as sericite, serpentine, and chlorite are found. In Proterozoic dykes of the Save-Limpopo dyke swarm, Lebombo dyke swarm and Olifants River dyke swarms, grain size is observed to be coarser with absence of olivine. Amphibolite, chlorite, and pyrite are found in a significant portion. Minerals in Protozoic rocks are more severely altered than in Jurassic dykes.

=== Mineralogy ===
The Okavango dyke swarm is mainly composed of mafic rocks, namely basalt, dolerite, gabbro and olivine-tholeiites. Minerals include 35–45% plagioclase, 20–35% clinopyroxene and Fe-Ti oxides. Both high-Ti oxides and low-Ti oxides varieties occur in the rocks.

Karoo triple junction	Okavango dyke swarm	Save-Limpopo Dyke Swarm	Lebombo dyke swarm	Olifants River Dyke Swarm
Orientation	ESE	ENE	N-S	Southern:~N45°, Middle:~N35°, Northern:~N68°
Geology	mainly basalt and dolerite			
Age of dykes included	Proterozoic and Mesozoic (~179 Ma in Jurassic)	Proterozoic (>728 Ma)and Mesozoic (131–179 Ma)	Proterozoic (1464 Ma)and Mesozoic (Jurassic)	Archean (<2470 Ma), Proterozoic (<851 Ma) and Mesozoic (Jurassic)
Dyke emplacement controlled by inherited structure	Yes			

== Tectonic setting ==
The intrusion of the Okavango Dyke Swarm is a polyphase system, meaning dyke emplacement occurred in a number of stages. Proterozoic dykes were formed by intrusions before the Dyke swarm extend westwards due to the Karoo magmatism at approximately 182 Ma.

The Gondwana supercontinent consists of present Africa, Madagascar, India and parts of Antarctica. The separation and assembly of plates induced the Karoo volcanism intrusive event. As two adjacent continents Africa and Antarctica moved in strike-slip motion, earthquakes were common. A dyke can be formed in a single earthquake. Hence in a series of earthquakes, a whole swarm of similar dykes can be formed.

There are different hypothesis developed to account for the origin of the Okavango Dyke Swarm as well as the Karoo Triple Junction, namely:

- Inherited dyke-induced fractures
- Mantle plume hypothesis
- Passive melting of Gondwana supercontinent

=== Model 1: Inherited and dyke-induced fractures ===
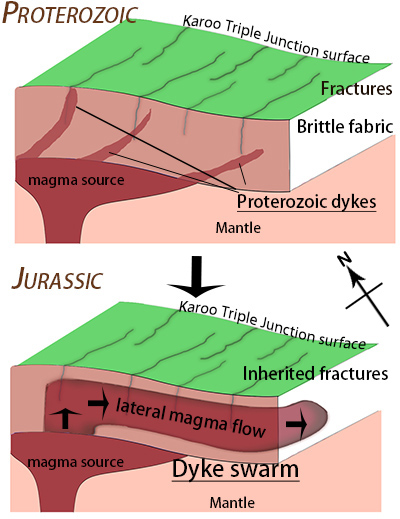
Evolution of Okavango dyke swarm due to inherited and dyke-induced fractures.

A number of dykes in the Okavango dyke swarm are dated as Proterozoic age (mainly ~884 Ma), which indicates the orientation of the dyke swarm was determined before the occurrence of Karoo magmatism.

It is suggested that the dyke emplacement in the Karoo triple junction was controlled by some rock structures of the pre-Karoo basement rocks. The rock fabrics at craton boundaries and basement rock control the orientation of Okavango dyke swarm The Okavango dyke swarm inherited the Proterozoic fractures in association with the previous Proterozoic dyke emplacement event.

The well-developed chilled margin and few xenoliths found on individual dykes indicate that the intrusion of a dyke was not a vigorous event at 180 Ma. The dyke swarm could extend for such a large area because of the pre-existing basement brittle fracture networks, instead of stress formed by the plate movement.

==== Dyke emplacement process ====
The geometry of the Karoo Triple Junction, which is the bulging upward of land surface, might be formed due to extensional tectonics. Cracking and jointing are induced, hence lines of weaknesses are developed in the region. In the Thune section of the Okavango dyke swarm, the texture of the rocks show evidence of deformation caused by tensional strain. Planar foliations are found in rock grains which are perpendicular to the dyke plane.

It is suggested that magma can flow laterally from east to west. So magma flowing to Okavango Dyke Swarm is sourced from lateral side from the Karoo Triple junction, rather than an uprising active mantle plume head.

Also, Proterozoic dykes and fractures present in the crust may control the orientation of dyke intrusion. When igneous intrusions occurred during the Karoo magmatism in the Jurassic period, they follow the directions of previous dykes. The number of Jurassic dykes accumulates, hence a giant dyke swarm can be developed in the region.

=== Model 2: Mantle plume hypothesis ===
Scientists usually relate development of large igneous province with active upwelling magma plumes, which are short-lived, rapid and high volume magmatism. The development of the Karoo triple junction geometry was believed to be formed by uplift of a mantle plume right underneath the triple junction itself.

- Stretching of lithosphere is found from 150 km to 50 km depth from the Karoo Large Igneous Province, which favours an upwelling plume head.
- A mantle plume is likely to form below extensive continental crust.
- Picrites and nephelinites are found in Karoo magmatism. They are known as igneous rocks formed from plume melts.
- The mantle plume in Karoo can be induced by distal plate subduction along Pacific margin of southern Gondwana.

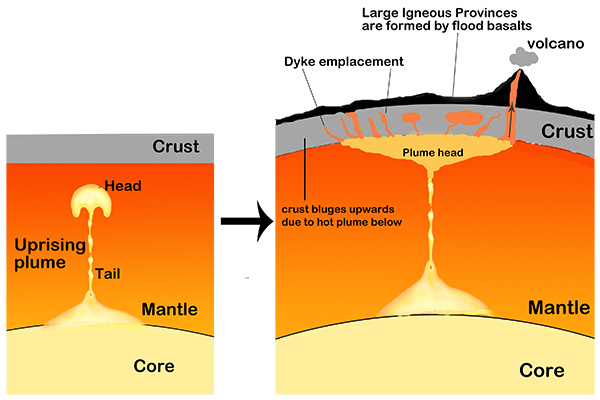

However, the Karoo triple junction where the Okavango Dyke Swarm is located may not be compatible with the hypothesis, due to the following reasons:

- Karoo magmatism lasted from 183–174 Ma which is almost twice the duration of a normal active magma plume.
- Lateral intruding melts from the Karoo triple junction are observed at the Okavango Dyke Swarm, which shows that it is not fed by a deep magma plume but instead from a shallow magma source.
- The sub-parallel Proterozoic dykes in the Okavango Dyke Swarm are the age constraint for the magma plume hypothesis. The Proterozoic dykes have an age of over 800Ma. But Karoo magmatism occurred at around 180Ma.

=== Model 3: Passive melting of Gondwana supercontinent ===
Another hypothesis of the Karoo Large Igneous Province (which includes the Okavango Dyke Swarm) is the lack of cooling within the mantle.

The lack of movement of the Gondwana supercontinent creates insulating effect to the sub-continental mantle. It may create significant impact to convection and temperature within the mantle. As the mantle is insulated by the thick subcontinental crust, heat accumulates and mantle temperature underneath the crust increases. Hence the temperature gradient between the mantle near core and lithosphere decreases, and convection cannot be sustained. The high temperature in the lithosphere causes crustal thinning and intrusions.

In addition, subduction zones present due to the movement of Gondwana continental fragments further influence the convection of mantle. Therefore, inhomogeneous mantle is formed and causes crustal thinning. Various igneous structures formed by magma intrusion from the mantle to crust and extrusion to the land surface.

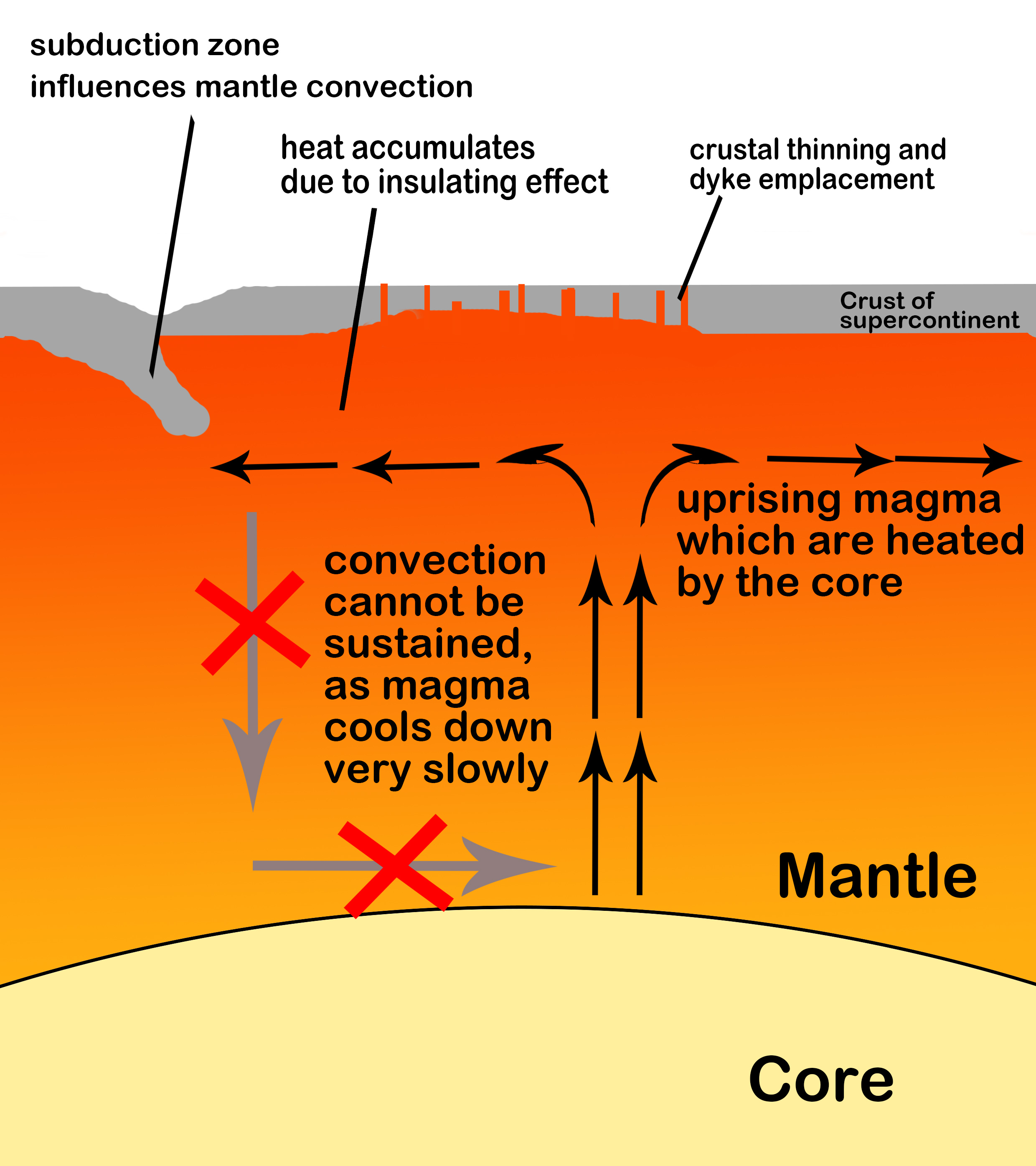
Subcontinental crust hinders the mantle convection as temperature gradient is interrupted. Heat accumulates and causes passive melting of Gondwana supercontinent, as well as formation of various igneous structure.

== Significance ==
The Okavango dyke swarm acts as a kinematic indicator for the Jurassic evolution of Karoo Large Igneous Province related to the fragmentation of Gondwana supercontinent, as it records the paleo-stress and strain.

The significant geometry of the Karoo triple junction formed by the giant dyke swarms can be used to identify the site of a mantle plume or anomalies in an easier way. The flow of magma and structure of rocks at the time of Karoo magmatism can be observed by the orientation of dyke swarm. Also, the geology of dyke-swarm and other igneous structures can be used to determine the origin of melts, as well as the tectonic movement during the supercontinent fragmentation.

== See also ==
- Karoo Supergroup
