= Vaasa granite =

Type of rock found in Finland

Vaasa granite is a migmatitic Paleoproterozoic garnet-bearing granitoid with variable amounts of gneissose enclaves. The name refers to occurrences at Vaasa, on the west coast of Finland.

== See also ==
- Bohus granite
- Jotnian
- Rapakivi granite
- Satakunta dyke swarms
