= Mistassini dike swarm =

Large geological structure in Canada

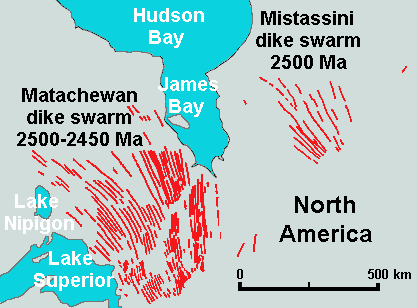
Map of the Matachewan and Mistassini dike swarms of Eastern Canada

The Mistassini dike swarm is a 2.5 billion year old Paleoproterozoic dike swarm of western Quebec, Canada. It consists of mafic dikes that were intruded in the Superior craton of the Canadian Shield. With an area of 100,000 km^{2} (39,000 sq mi), the Mistassini dike swarm stands as a large igneous province.

== See also ==
- Matachewan dike swarm
