= Bohus granite =

Type of granite found along the west coast of Sweden

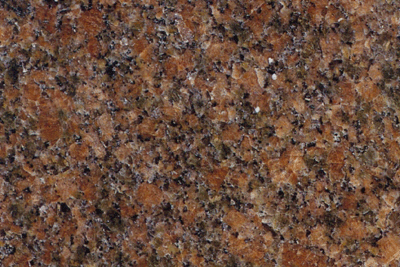
Polished surface of a Bohus granite.

Simplified geological map of Sweden. The Bohus granites are shown as a belt in the northern Swedish West Coast.

Bohus granite (Swedish: Bohusgranit) is a type of granite found along the west coast of Sweden, in Bohuslän. In Norway, these are called Iddefjord granite (Norwegian: Iddefjordsgranitt), Østfold granite and Halden granite. A large quarrying industry has developed around them, mainly producing blocks. Large scale extraction begun in the 1840s and employment in the quarries peaked in the 1920s with over 7,000 people working in the industry. The rock is valued for its durability. In the first half of the 20th century, quarried Bohus granite was often transported on the Lysekil rail line. In Norway, Iddefjord granite is a relatively common rock in architecture, and many of the statues of Frogner Park in Oslo are made of it. Iddefjord granite is the official county rock of Østfold in Norway.

== Geology ==
Geologically, Bohus is a monzogranite granite. Besides the main minerals plagioclase, K-feldspar and quartz, it contains smaller amounts of magnetite, apatite, zircon, titanite, garnet and monazite. In restricted areas alteration of the original rock has added prehnite, calcite and chlorite to the mineral assemblage. The texture of the granites varies from fine grained to coarse grained. The granites have pegmatite dykes associated to them. In terms of geochemistry the rocks have a narrow range of high silica contents (68–75 wt% SiO_{2}) and are mildly peraluminous. The Bohus granites have also high uranium and thorium contents.

The magma that formed the granites cooled about 920 million years ago after the end of the Sveconorwegian orogeny. The intrusion of the Bohus granite was the last in a period of widespread intrusion of plutons in southwestern Sweden. The Bohus granites intruded and cooled in the brittle middle crust, later being rapidly exhumed so that by the time of the formation of the Sub-Cambrian peneplain in the Late Neoproterozoic the rocks were at surface. Subsequently, the granites were buried in sediments and then intruded by NNW-SSE oriented basic dykes in the Permian. In the Mesozoic the rocks were subject to significant weathering resulting in the formation an irregular grand-scale relief called the Sub-Mesozoic hilly peneplain. At a smaller scale the weathering is thought to have produced numerous small rock basins now seen near the coast.

== See also ==
- Black granite
- Kattsund-Koster dyke swarm
- Transscandinavian Igneous Belt
- Vaasa granite
