= Independence dike swarm =

Large geological structure in California

Coordinates: 36.8°N 118.3°W

The Independence Dike Swarm is a major Late Jurassic dike swarm extending over 373 miles (600 km) from the eastern Transverse Ranges northward to the east-central Sierra Nevada in southeastern California, United States.

The swarm consists of hundreds of dikes, filled with mafic to felsic rocks and are individually about 10 feet (3 m) in width. These dikes may be the roots of linear-fissure-array supervolcanoes.
