= Kattsund-Koster dyke swarm =

Large geological structure in Norway and Sweden

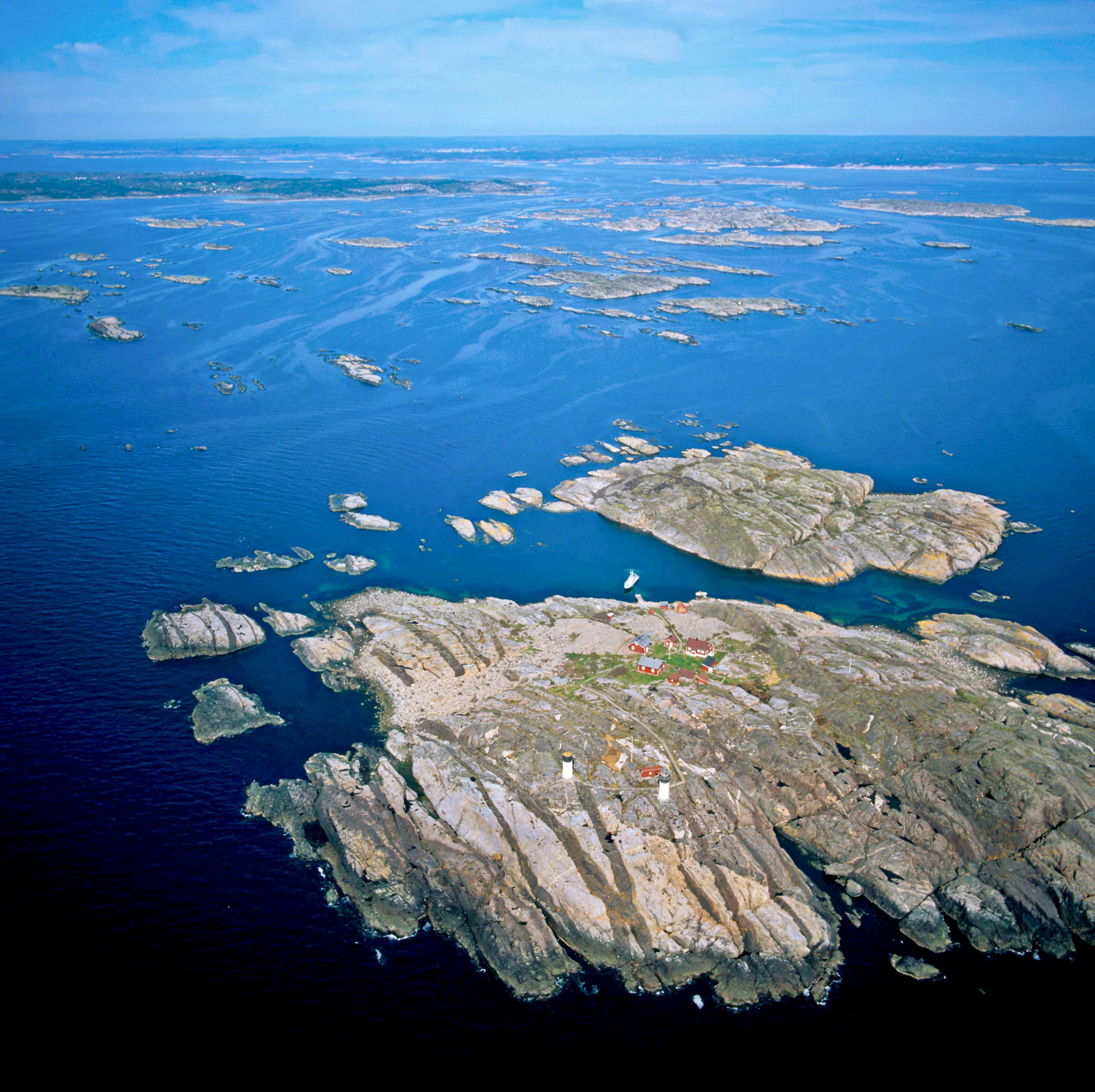
View of the diabase and gabbro dykes in the Koster Islands, Sweden.

The Kattsund-Koster dyke swarm is a dyke swarm of Mesoproterozoic age in southeastern Norway and the West Coast of Sweden. The most prominent outcrops are in the Koster Islands in Sweden and Kattsund in Norway, hence the name. The dykes are made up of tholeiitic diabase and some dykes of intermediate composition. Some dykes are deformed and metamorphosed into amphibolite. Radiometric dating has shown that the dyke swarm is about 1421 million years old. Geologists have suggested that the dyke swarm is related to extensional tectonics.

== See also ==
- Bohus granite
- Gothian orogeny
- Jotnian
- Satakunta dike swarms
- Sveconorwegian orogeny
