= Sub-Mesozoic hilly peneplains =

Landscape in Scandinavia of undulating hills and joint valleys

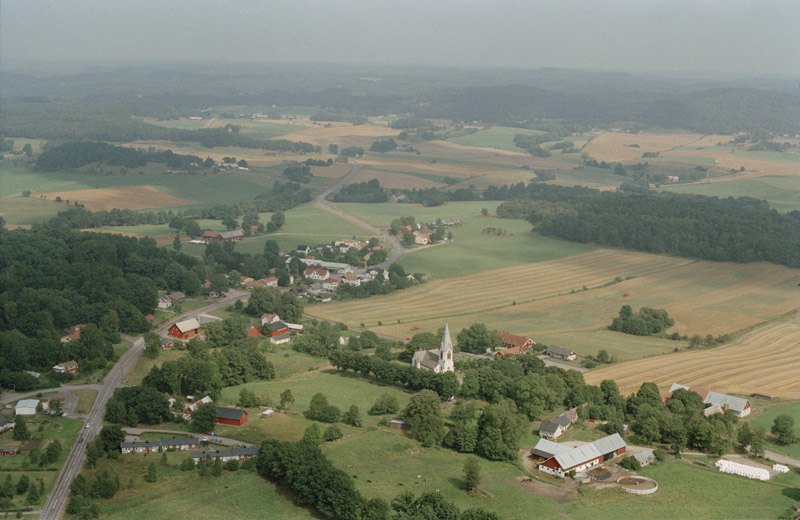
An undulating hilly landscape in Falkenberg Municipality, Halland.

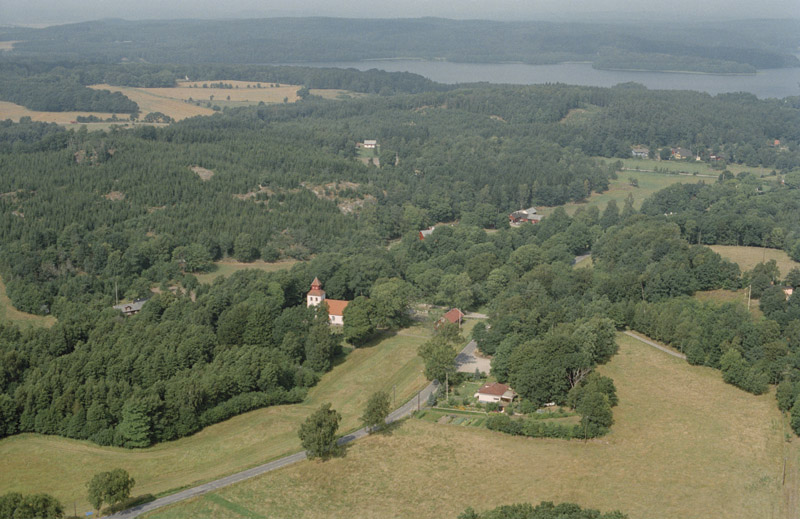
An undulating hilly landscape in Varberg Municipality, Halland.

The Sub-Mesozoic hilly peneplains or Sub-Mesozoic hilly relief is a landscape in Scandinavia made up of undulating hills and joint valleys and occasional kaolinized bedrock in valley bottoms. The landscape formed in the Mesozoic Era and was eventually drowned by the sea during the Campanian transgression and covered by a thick blanket of Cretaceous sedimentary rocks. Later erosion of the cover rocks partly re-exposed this landscape. During the Quaternary epoch the re-exposed Mesozoic hilly relief escaped major glacier erosion being only surficially scoured in parts.

The Sub-Mesozoic hilly relief formed starting from a peneplain formed in the Permian and Triassic. Remnants of this peneplain can be traced as a tilted summit accordance in the Swedish West Coast. This would indicated that Paleozoic strata that covered much of Fennoscandia elsewhere had been locally uplifted and eroded prior to the formation of the Sub-Mesozoic hilly relief.

The Sub-Mesozoic hilly peneplains covers a contiguous zone along western and southern rims of the South Swedish Dome. This zone includes most of Bohuslän, Halland and Blekinge as well as parts of Västergötland and Scania. In parts this surface and unconformity makes up an undulating hilly relief, while in other locations like Blekinge and northern Halland it is a joint valley landscape. In Bohuslän the Mesozoic weathering associated with hilly relief is likely also responsible for creating the numerous small rock basins carved into Bohus granite that characterize the coast.
