= Matachewan hotspot =

Coordinates: 50°N 83°W

The Matachewan hotspot was a volcanic hotspot responsible for the creation of the large 2,500 to 2,450 million year old Matachewan dike swarm, as well as continental rifting of the Superior and Hearne cratons during the Paleoproterozoic period.

== See also ==
- Volcanism of Canada
- Volcanism of Eastern Canada
- Mackenzie hotspot
- Great Lakes Tectonic Zone
