= Dike swarm =

Geological structure

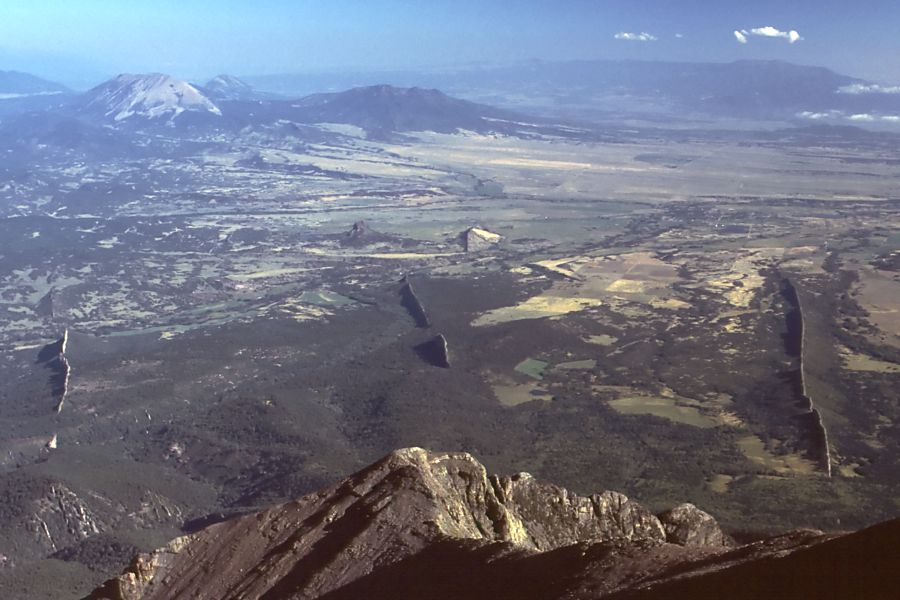
Magmatic dikes radiating from West Spanish Peak, Colorado, US

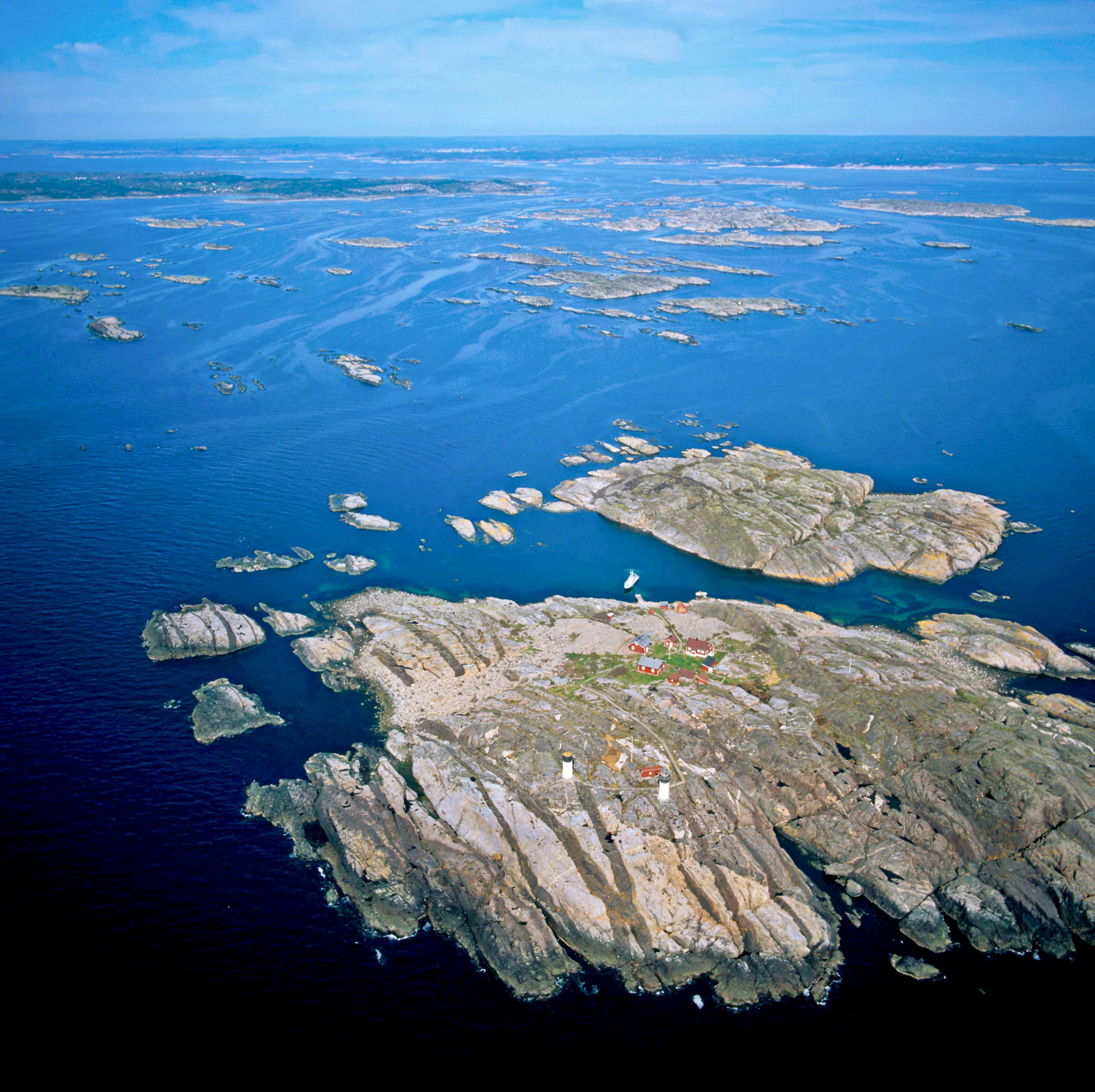
View of the Kattsund-Koster dyke swarm in the Koster Islands, western Sweden

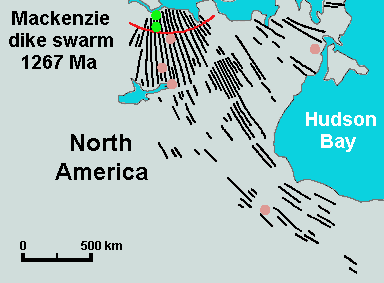
Map of the Mackenzie dike swarm in Canada

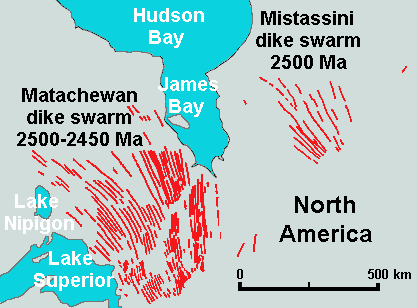
Map of the Matachewan and Mistassini dike swarms in Canada

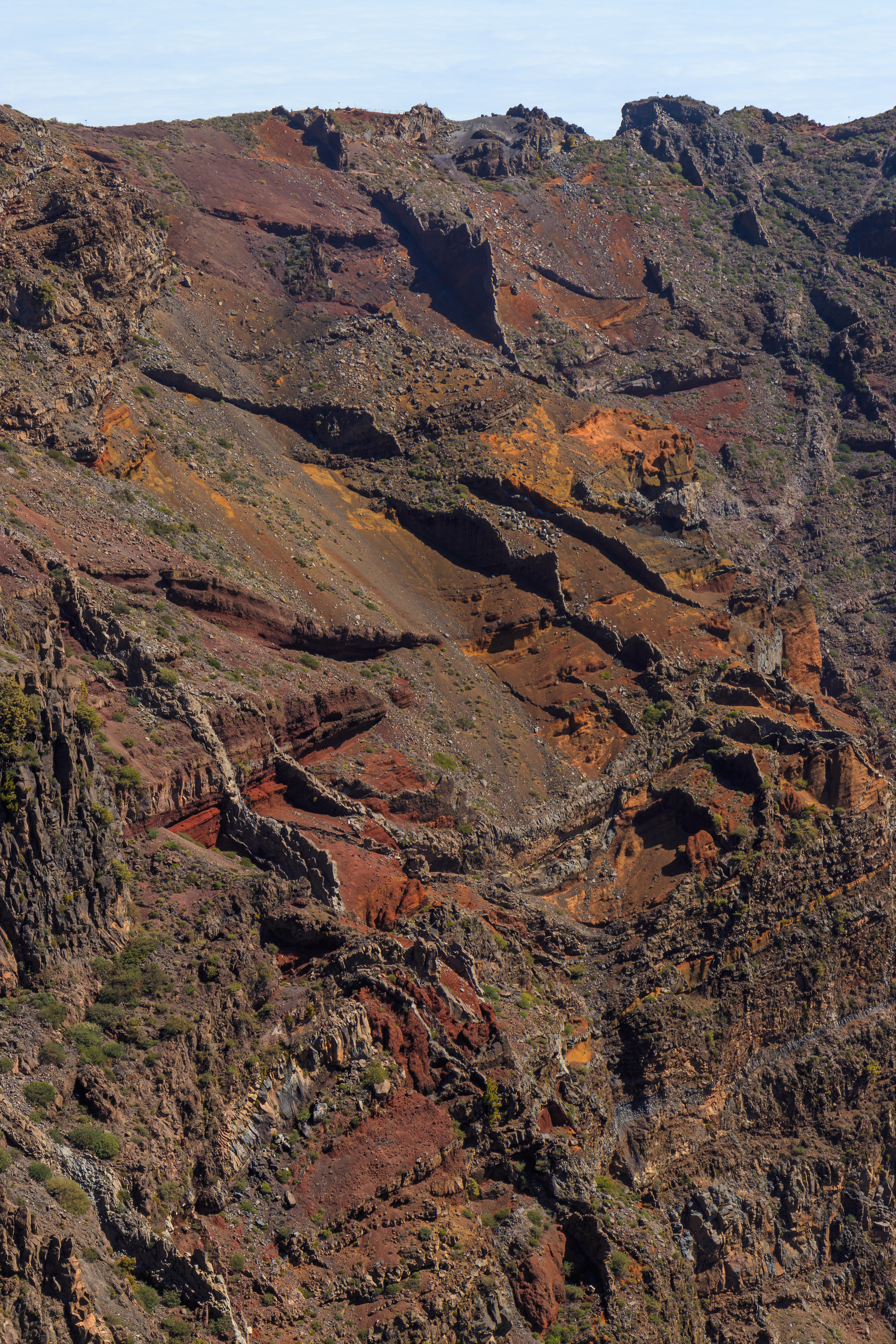
Dike swarms of Caldera de Taburiente, La Palma, Spain

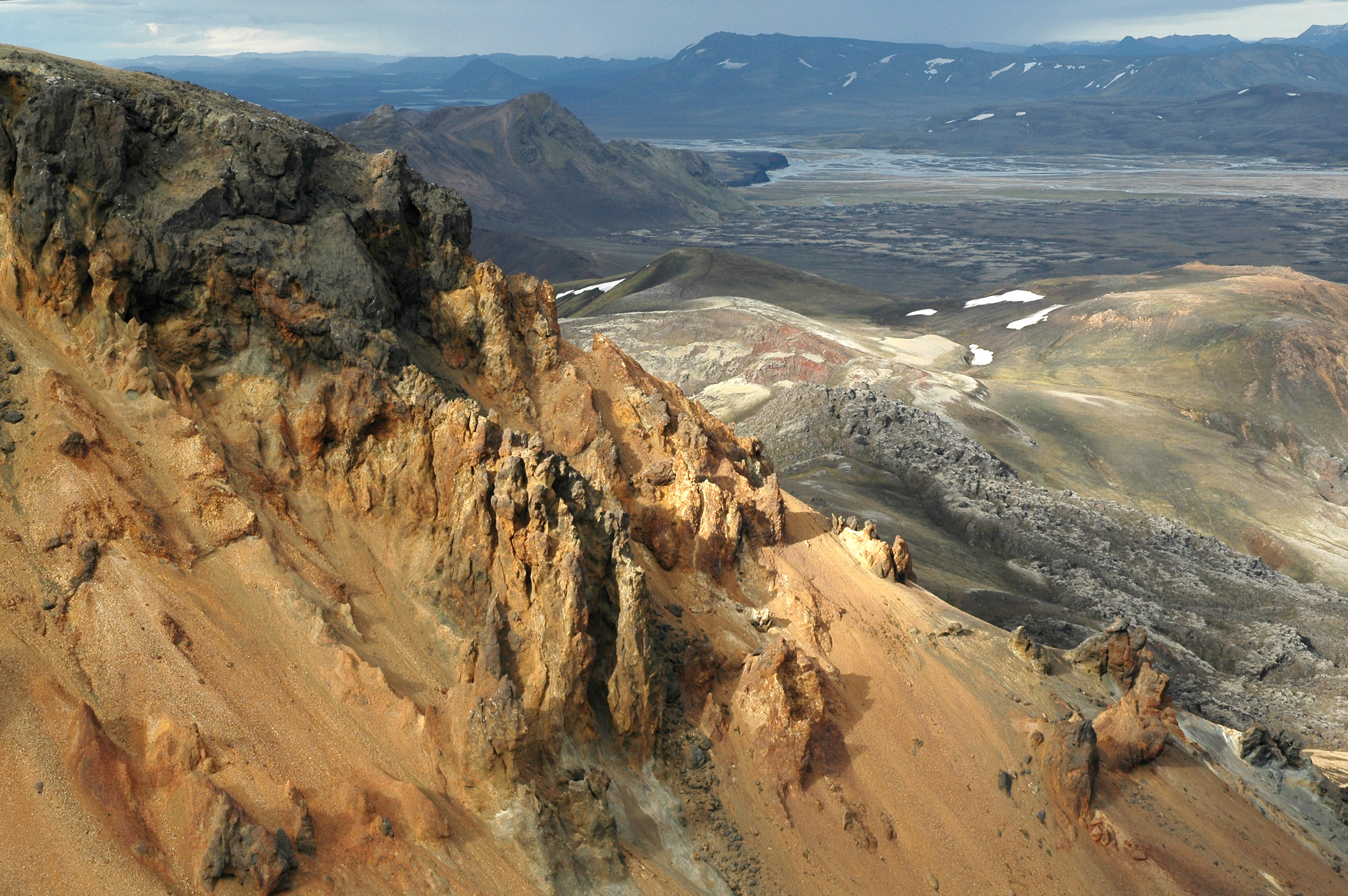
Heavily altered dike swarm of the Torfajökull caldera near Landmannalaugar, Iceland

A dike swarm (American spelling) or dyke swarm (British spelling) is a large geological structure consisting of a major group of parallel, linear, or radially oriented magmatic dikes intruded within continental crust or central volcanoes in rift zones. Examples exist in Iceland and near other large volcanoes (stratovolcanoes, calderas, shield volcanoes and other fissure systems) around the world. A swarm consists of several to hundreds of dikes emplaced more or less contemporaneously during a single intrusive event, are magmatic and stratigraphic, and may form a large igneous province.

Sedimentary clastic dike swarms also exist on Earth, with a notable example in the Chilean southern Andes.

Magmatic dike swarms have also been found on Venus and Mars.

== Description ==
Dike swarms may extend over 400 km (250 mi) in width and length. The largest dike swarm known on Earth is the Mackenzie dike swarm in the western half of the Canadian Shield in Canada, which is more than 500 km (310 mi) wide and 3,000 km (1,900 mi) long.

About 25 giant dike swarms are known on Earth. The primary geometry of most giant dike swarms is poorly known due to their old age and subsequent tectonic activity.

The occurrence of mafic dike swarms in Archean and Paleoproterozoic terrains is often cited as evidence for mantle plume activity associated with abnormally high mantle potential temperatures.

== Examples ==
=== Africa ===
- Cape Peninsula dyke swarm (South Africa)
- Okavango Dyke Swarm (Botswana)
- Dolerite dikes in Guéra Massif (Chad, Central Africa)

=== Antarctica ===
- Vestfold Hills dike swarms (East Antarctica)

=== Asia ===
- North China dike swarm (North China craton, China)
- Sayan dike swarm (Russia)
- Shirotori-Hiketa dike swarm (northeastern Shikoku, Japan)

=== Australia ===
- Gairdner dyke swarm (South Australia)
- Mundine Well dyke swarm (Western Australia)
- Wood's Point dyke swarm (Victoria, Australia)

=== Europe ===
- Barents Sea dike swarm
- Egersund dike swarm (southwest Norway)
- Kattsund-Koster dyke swarm (southeast Norway, Swedish west coast)
- Kildonan dyke swarm (Isle of Arran, Scotland)
- Kirov dike swarm (Russia)
- Mull and Skye dyke swarms, Scotland
- Orano dike swarm (Elba, Italy)
- Satakunta dike swarms, Finland
- Sayda-Bergiesshuebel dike swarm (Saxony, Germany)
- Scourie dyke swarm (northwest Scotland)
- Uralian dike swarm, Russia

=== North America ===
==== Canada ====
- Bella Bella and Gale Passage dike swarms (central British Columbia Coast)
- Franklin dike swarm (Northern Canada)
- Grenville dike swarm (Ontario and Quebec)
- Mackenzie dike swarm (Northwest Territories, Nunavut, Saskatchewan, Manitoba and Ontario)
- Marathon dike swarm (northwestern Ontario)
- Matachewan dike swarm (eastern Ontario)
- Mistassini dike swarm (western Quebec)
- Sudbury dike swarm (northeastern Ontario)
- Long Range dikes (Newfoundland and Labrador)

==== Greenland ====
- Kangaamiut dike swarm (western Greenland)

==== United States ====
- Chief Joseph dike swarm (southeastern Washington, northeastern Oregon)
- Kennedy dike swarm (southeastern Wyoming)
- Magdalena radial dike swarm (central New Mexico)
- San Rafael Swell dike swarm (Utah)
- Spanish Peaks Dike Swarm, southern Colorado
- Warm Springs Mountain dike swarm (Nevada)
- Independence dike swarm (southeastern California)

=== South America ===
- Dyke swarms associated with the Paraná and Etendeka traps
  - Cuaró dyke swarm, Uruguay
  - Eastern Paraguay dyke swarm
- Ocros dyke swarm, Peru
- Uruguayan dyke swarms
  - Florida dyke swarm
  - Nico Perez dyke swarm
  - Treinta y Tres dyke swarm
- Dyke swarms of Tandil and Azul (Buenos Aires Province, Argentina)
- Rio Ceará-Mirim dyke swarm

== See also ==
- Sheet intrusion
- Sheeted dyke complex
- Sill swarm
