= Sill swarm =

A sill swarm or sill complex in geology is a major group of sills intruded within continental crust. They are located under volcanic edifices, including flood basalt provinces and large lava plateaus. The volume of sill swarms can be similar to dike swarms.

== Examples ==
- Chatsworth sill swarm, Victoria, Australia
- Loch Scridain Basalt-Rhyolite Sill Swarm, Mull, Scotland
- Morel sills, near Coronation Gulf, Nunavut, Canada
- Rio Perdido sill swarm, Mato Grosso do Sul, Brazil
- Sariwon Sill Swarm, China
- Sill swarm in the Nahuel Niyeu Formation of Patagonia, Argentina
