= Matachewan dike swarm =

Large geological structure in Canada

Coordinates: 50°N 83°W

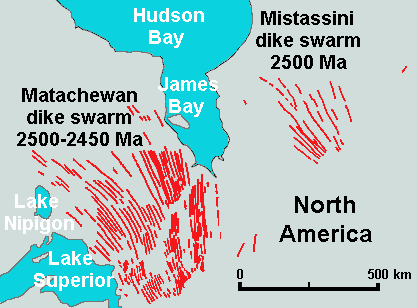
Map of the Matachewan and Mistassini dike swarms of Eastern Canada

The Matachewan dike swarm is a large 2,500 to 2,450 million year old Paleoproterozoic dike swarm of Northern Ontario, Canada. It consists of basaltic dikes that were intruded in greenschist, granite-greenstone, and metamorphosed sedimentary terrains of the Superior Craton of the Canadian Shield. With an area of 360,000 square kilometres (140,000 sq mi), the Matachewan dike swarm stands as a large igneous province.

== See also ==
- Matachewan hotspot
