= Lenticular fabric =

Type of cloth

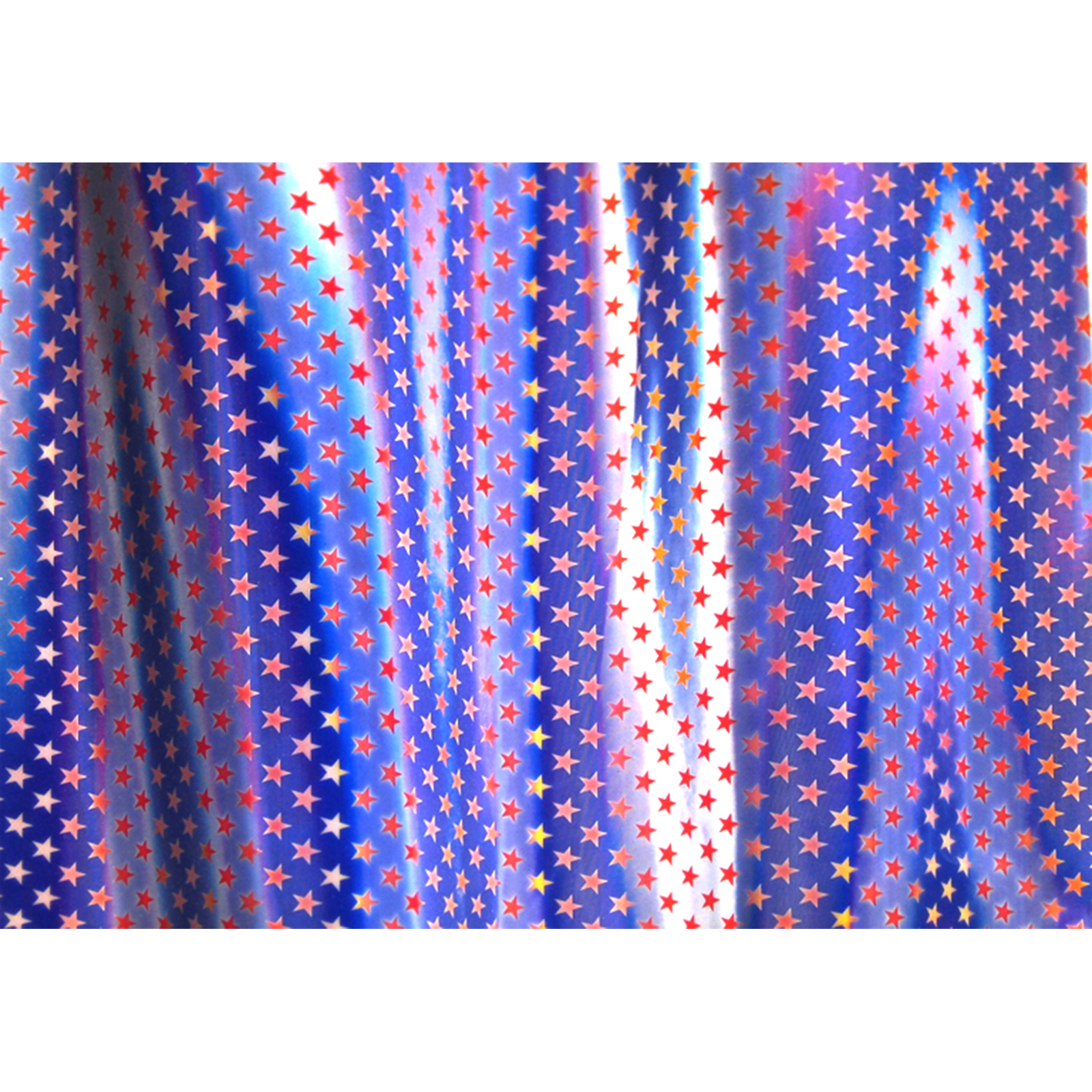
An example of a lenticular fabric sheet that changes from a blue background with white stars to a white background with red stars.

A lenticular fabric is a lattice-like arrangement of lens-shaped materials formed into a thin layer. When the surface of the fabric is smooth, it often has a reflective and light-distorting appearance.

== In geology ==
Lenticular fabrics are found in nature. Geological forces can produce lenticular fabrics consisting of quartz "microlenses" in clay deposits.

== In biology ==
Lenticular fabrics can be created through biological processes. For example, termites create these fabrics by combining sand with fibrous faeces to create plastic-like translucent barriers.

== Technology ==
Manufactured lenticular fabric is used to make movie projection screens, so that the image will appear sharper and brighter.

Lenticular fabric is often used for decorative purposes. It is typically made from PVC with an interlaced lenticular image covered in a lenticular lens and has a variety of uses, including sewing clothing and craft projects, such as scrap-booking. The lenticular lens on lenticular fabric leads to a variety of effects, such as flip effect of images, 3D-depth, color-changing, motion, morph, zoom, explosion, etc.

Lenticular fabric has been utilized in clothing and accessories to create animated imagery and 3-D effects by fashion brands such as Walter van Beirendonck, Miu Miu, Doublet, Christopher Kane, and Leeann Huang.

Lenticular fabric is used to represent futuristic clothing in films and TV. An example of lenticular fabric appears in the movie, Back to the Future Part II, in which Marty McFly wears a lenticular baseball cap.
