= Satakunta dyke swarms =

Large geological structure in Finland

The Satakunta dyke swarms are a series of dyke swarms, a group of magmatic intrusions, of Mesoproterozoic age in the Bothnian Sea and western and central Finland. They are made up of Subjotnian diabase dikes, associated with rapakivi magmatism. They were most likely formed on the Columbia supercontinent.

== Häme dyke swarm ==
The Häme dyke swarm formed due to the upwelling of mantle, possibly related to the Gothian orogeny. The swarms were triggered by extensional plate tectonics and convection of hot upper mantle. Tholeiitic magmas, formed under the continental lithosphere, were probably encouraged by elevated mantle temperature underneath the Columbia supercontinent. The time of formation was approximately 1640 million years ago.

== Satakunta-Ulvö dyke swarm ==
The dyke swarm has been considered to be a result of a failed rift in the Bothnian Sea that developed as part of an extensional tectonic setting within the supercontinent of Columbia. At various location dykes of the swarm cut across Jotnian sediments indicating a Postjotnian age for the dyke swarm. Viewed in a map the dyke swarm has the form of a 90-degrees fan radiating open to the east from a point in the Bothnian Sea.

== See also ==
- Gothian orogeny
- Kattsund-Koster dyke swarm
