= Sill (geology) =

Tabular intrusion between older layers of rock

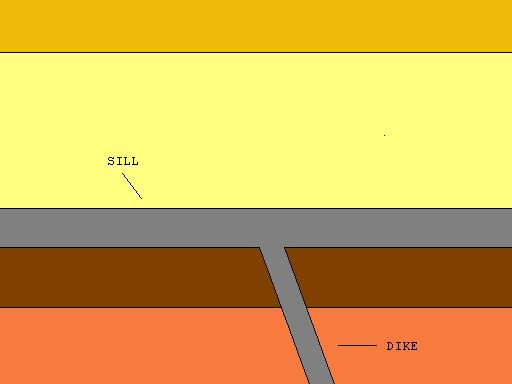
Illustration showing the difference between a dike and a sill.

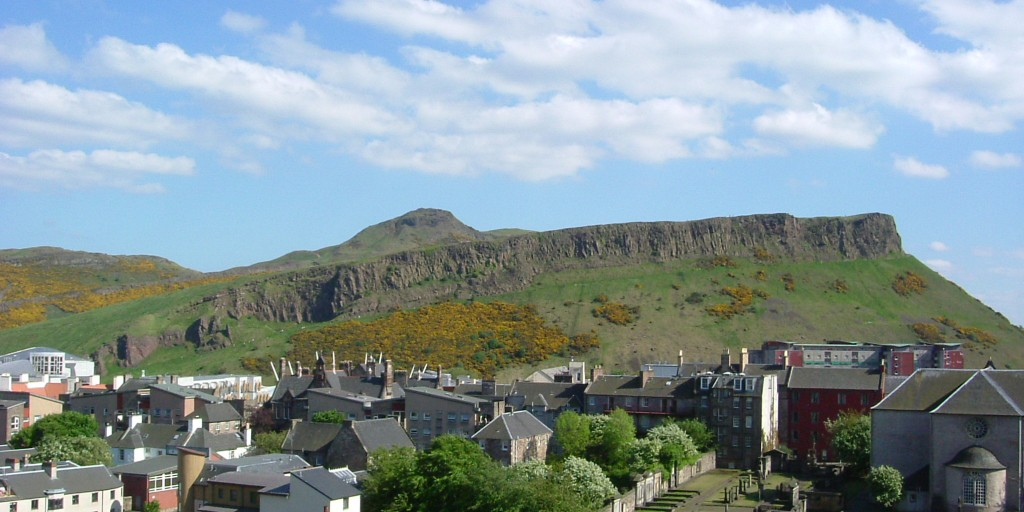
Salisbury Crags in Edinburgh, Scotland, a sill partially exposed during the Quaternary glaciation

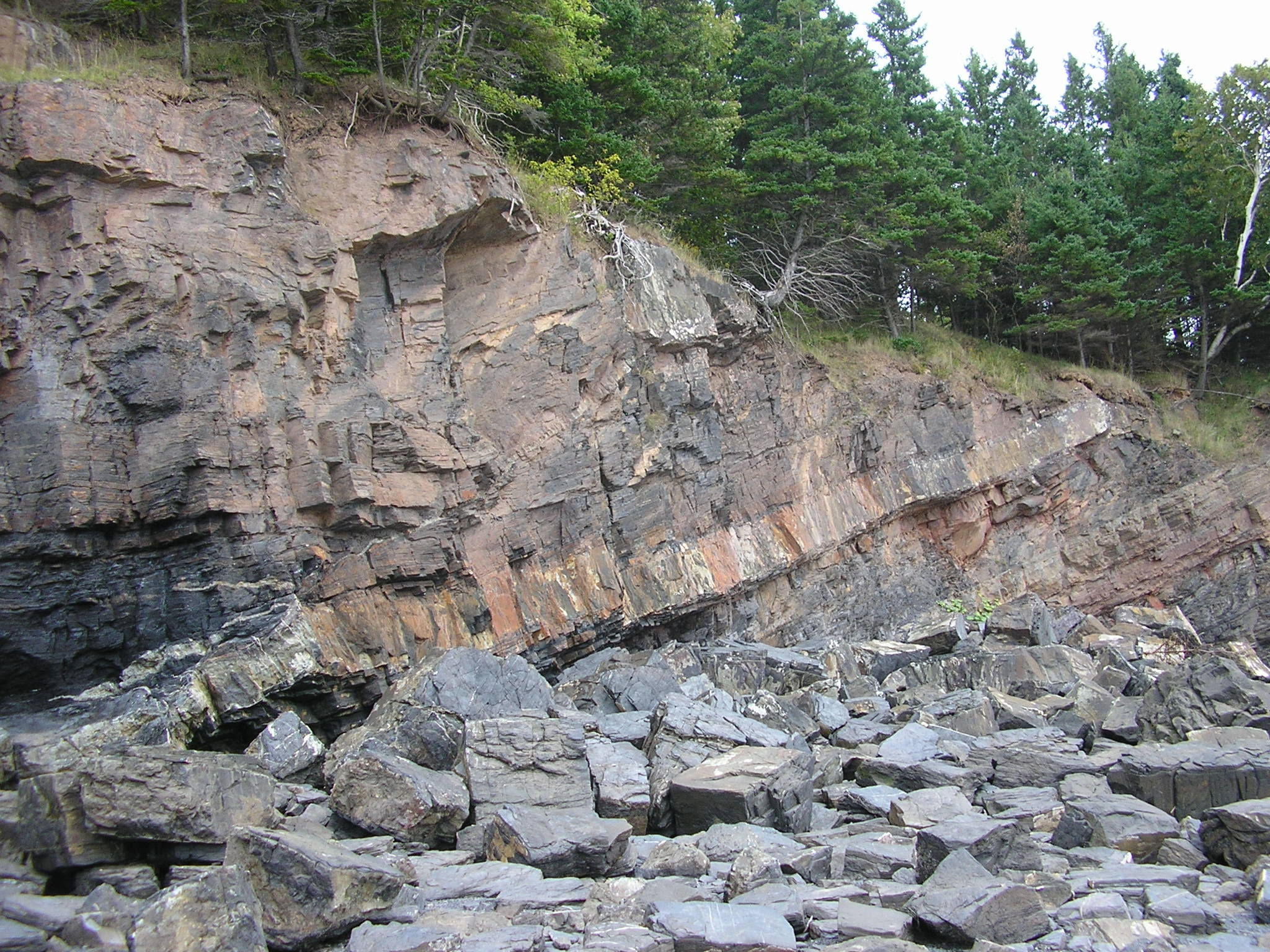
Mid-Carboniferous dolerite sill cutting Lower Carboniferous shales and sandstones, Horton Bluff, Minas Basin South Shore, Nova Scotia

In geology, a sill is a tabular sheet intrusion that has intruded between older layers of sedimentary rock, beds of volcanic lava or tuff, or along the direction of foliation in metamorphic rock. A sill is a concordant intrusive sheet, meaning that it does not cut across preexisting rock beds. Stacking of sills builds a sill complex and a large magma chamber at high magma flux. In contrast, a dike is a discordant intrusive sheet, which does cut across older rocks.

== Formation ==
Sills are fed by dikes, except in unusual locations where they form in nearly vertical beds attached directly to a magma source. The rocks must be brittle and fracture to create the planes along which the magma intrudes the parent rock bodies, whether this occurs along preexisting planes between sedimentary or volcanic beds or weakened planes related to foliation in metamorphic rock. These planes or weakened areas allow the intrusion of a thin sheet-like body of magma paralleling the existing bedding planes, concordant fracture zone, or foliations. Sills run parallel to beds (layers) and foliations in the surrounding country rock. They can be originally emplaced in a horizontal orientation, although tectonic processes may cause subsequent rotation of horizontal sills up to near vertical orientations.

Sills can be confused with solidified lava flows; however, there are several differences between them. Intruded sills will show partial melting and incorporation of the surrounding country rock. On both contact surfaces of the country rock into which the sill has intruded, evidence of heating will be observed (contact metamorphism). Lava flows will show this evidence only on the lower side of the flow. In addition, lava flows will typically show evidence of vesicles (bubbles) where gases escaped into the atmosphere. Because sills form below the surface, even though generally at shallow depths (up to a few kilometers), the pressure of overlying rock means few if any vesicles can form in a sill. Lava flows will also typically show evidence of weathering on their upper surface, whereas sills, if still covered by country rock, typically do not.

== Associated ore deposits ==
Certain layered intrusions are a variety of sill that often contain important ore deposits. Precambrian examples include the Bushveld, Insizwa and the Great Dyke complexes of southern Africa; and the Duluth intrusive complex along Lake Superior, and the Stillwater igneous complex of the United States. Phanerozoic examples are usually smaller and include the Rùm peridotite complex of Scotland and the Skaergaard igneous complex of east Greenland. These intrusions often contain concentrations of gold, platinum, chromium and other rare elements.

== Transgressive sills ==
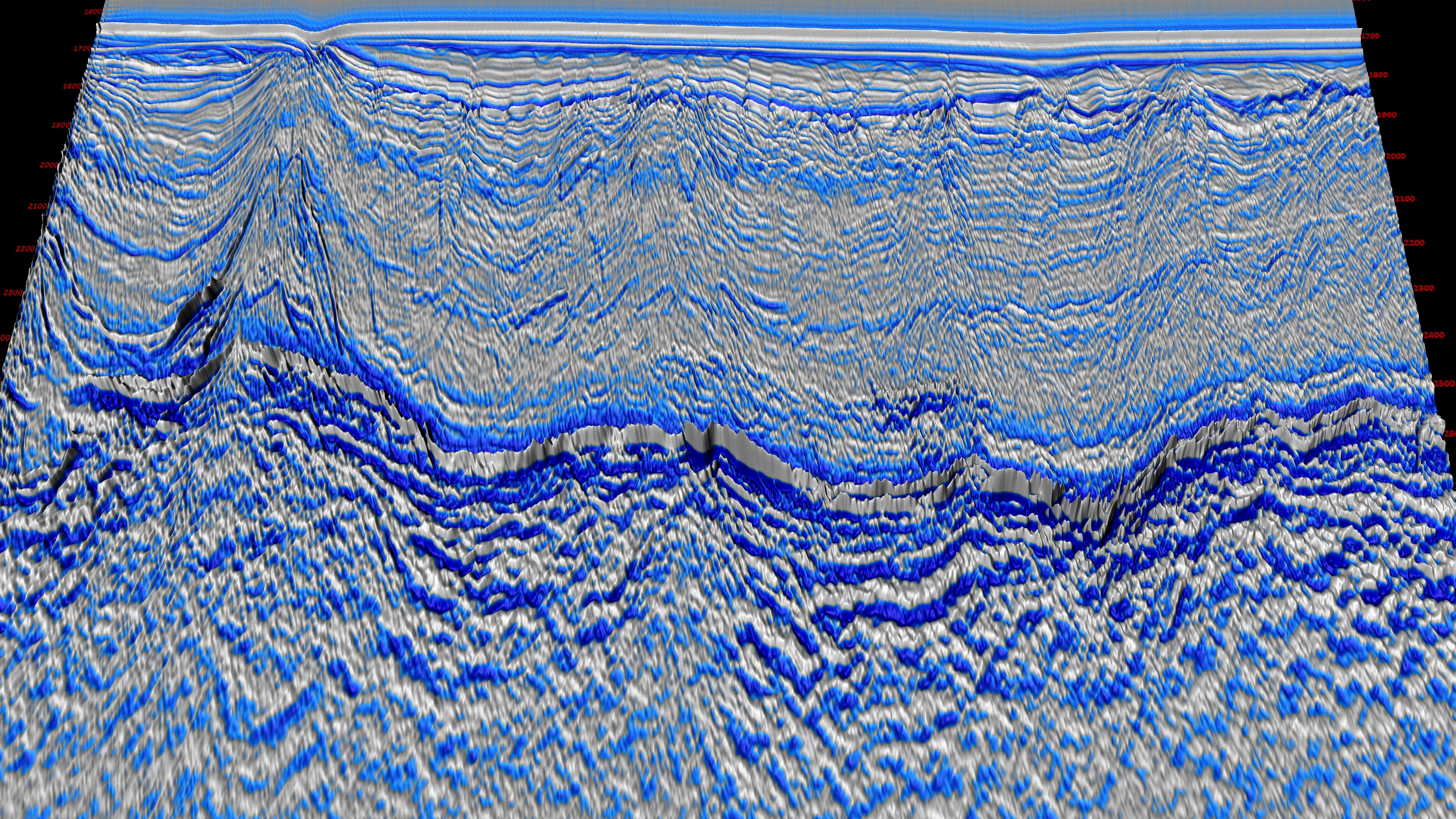
Seismic expression of basaltic sills from the Rockall Trough. Data courtesy UK OGA.

Despite their concordant nature, many large sills change stratigraphic level within the intruded sequence, with each concordant part of the intrusion linked by relatively short dike-like segments. Such sills are known as transgressive. The geometry of large sill complexes in sedimentary basins has become clearer with the availability of 3D seismic reflection data. Such data has shown that many sills have an overall saucer shape and that many others are at least in part transgressive.

Examples include the Whin Sill and sills within the Karoo basin.

== See also ==
- Aquatic sill
- Batholith
- Dike
- Laccolith
- Sill swarm
- Stock
