= Sheet intrusion =

Geologic process and formation

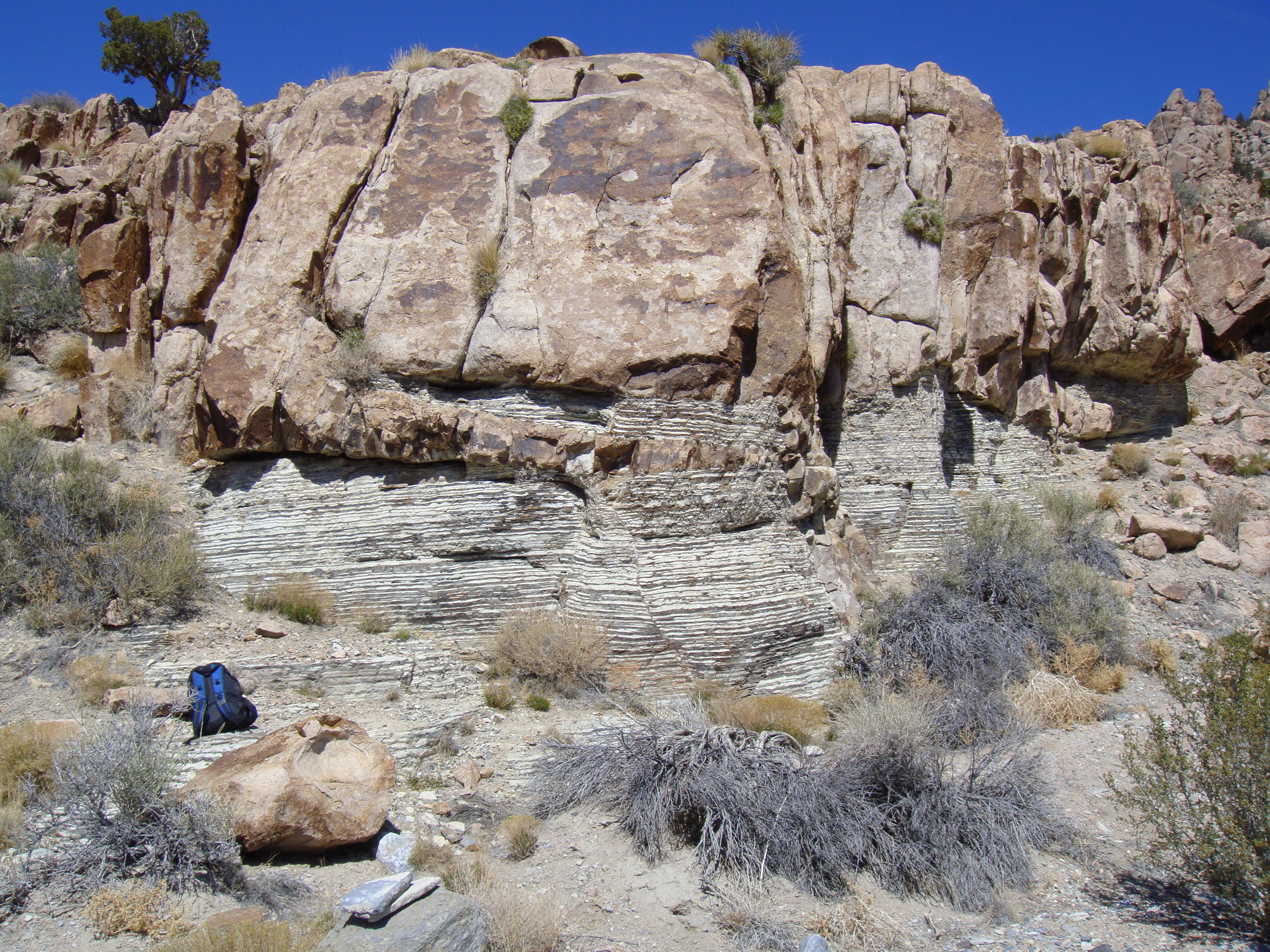
A sill of monzonite intrudes Cambrian carbonate bedrock, near Notch Peak, Utah.

A sheet intrusion, or tabular intrusion, is a planar sheet of roughly the same thickness, that forms inside a pre-existing rock. When it cuts into another unlayered mass, or across layers, it is called a dike. When it is formed between layers in a layered rock mass, it is called a sill.

An igneous sheet intrusion is formed where a mass of molten magma takes advantage of a pre-existing linear feature in a host rock, such as a long rupture or fault, and forces its way into these spaces. Thus the magma, intruded between existing rocks, solidifies into large thin sheets of igneous rock. They are among the most extensive igneous features on Earth, in the form of dikes, laccoliths, cone sheets and sills.

When limestone or other precipitate forms in a fault space, it is a sedimentary sheet intrusion.
