= Menan Buttes =

Volcano in Idaho, United States

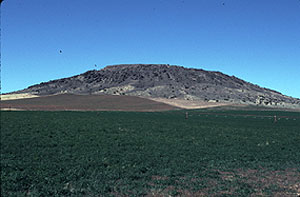
- North Menan Butte

Highest point
- Elevation: 5,619 ft (1,713 m)
- Coordinates: 43°47′04″N 111°58′23″W

Geography
- Location within Idaho
- Location: Madison / Jefferson counties, Idaho, United States

Geology
- Rock age(s): late Pleistocene, approximately 8000 BC
- Mountain type: tuff cones

U.S. National Natural Landmark
- Designated: 1980

The North and South Menan Buttes in southeastern Idaho are two of the world's largest volcanic tuff cones. The two cones, with four smaller associated cones, align along a north-northwest line and comprise the Menan Complex. The buttes rise about 800 feet (250 m) above the surrounding Snake River plain and are late Pleistocene in age, dating to approximately 10,000 YBP (Years Before Present). The South Menan Butte is currently in private hands, however North Menan Butte is publicly owned and has been designated as a National Natural Landmark and a Research Natural Area by the United States Congress. The US Bureau of Land Management designated the North Butte as an Area of Critical Environmental Concern (ACEC).

The volcanoes forming the two major Menan Buttes were created when basaltic magma came into contact with a shallow aquifer or with the precursor of the modern Snake River. Particles of volcanic glass called tachylite were created as the water turned to steam and explosively fragmented the hot magma. The cone shaped deposits are fairly uniform and consist primarily of tuff in lapilli-size particles. Some deposit layers preserve indentations, designated as "bomb sags", made as larger pyroclastic particles landed on soft layers of tuff.

The Menan Buttes stand at an elevation of 5,619 feet (1,713 m.) and are very similar in size and shape. North Menan Butte is slightly larger and elliptical, with axes 3.5 and 2.5 km in length. South Menan Butte measures 3 km x 2 km. The crater of the North Menan Butte is about 3,000 feet (900 m) in diameter and the cone is about 6,000 feet (1,800 m) in diameter. The North Butte's volume is 0.16 cubic miles (0.70 cubic km) and the South Butte measures at 0.07 cubic miles (0.30 cubic km). In comparison, the better known tuff cone Diamond Head on Oahu has a volume of 0.15 cubic miles (0.6 cubic km). The larger buttes in the Menan Complex are asymmetrical. Each has a greater accumulation of material on the northeast, presumably due to strong southwest winds during the initial eruption.

The Menan Buttes are located in Madison County, with lower slopes extending westward into Jefferson County. Nearby communities include Menan, Rigby, Rexburg and Idaho Falls, Idaho.

== See also ==
- Island Park Caldera
- Phreatomagmatic eruption
- Yellowstone hotspot

== Additional sources ==
- Creighton, D.N., 1987, Menan Buttes, southeastern Idaho, in Beus, S.S., ed., Centennial Field Guide Volume 2 Rocky Mountain Section of the Geological Society of America, p. 109–111.
- Greeley, R., 1977, 5. Aerial guide to the geology of the central and eastern Snake River Plain, in Greeley, R., and King, J.S., eds., Volcanism of the eastern Snake River Plain, Idaho: A comparative planetary geology guidebook: NASA, Washington, D.C., p. 59–112.
- Hackett, W.R., and Morgan, L.A., 1988, Explosive basaltic and rhyolitic volcanism of the eastern Snake River Plain, in Link, P.K., and Hackett, W.R., eds., Guidebook to the Geology of Central and Southern Idaho: Idaho Geological Survey Bulletin 27, p. 283–301.
- Hamilton, W., and Myers, W.B., 1963, Menan Buttes, cones of glassy basalt tuff in the Snake River Plain, Idaho: U.S. Geological Survey Professional paper 450E, p. E114-E118.
- Stearns, H.T., Crandall, L., and Steward, W.G., 1938, Geology and ground-water resources of the Snake River Plain in Southeastern Idaho: U.S. Geological Survey Water-Supply Paper 774, 268 p.
