= Huckleberry Ridge Tuff =

Tuff formation in Wyoming and Idaho

Huckleberry Ridge eruption
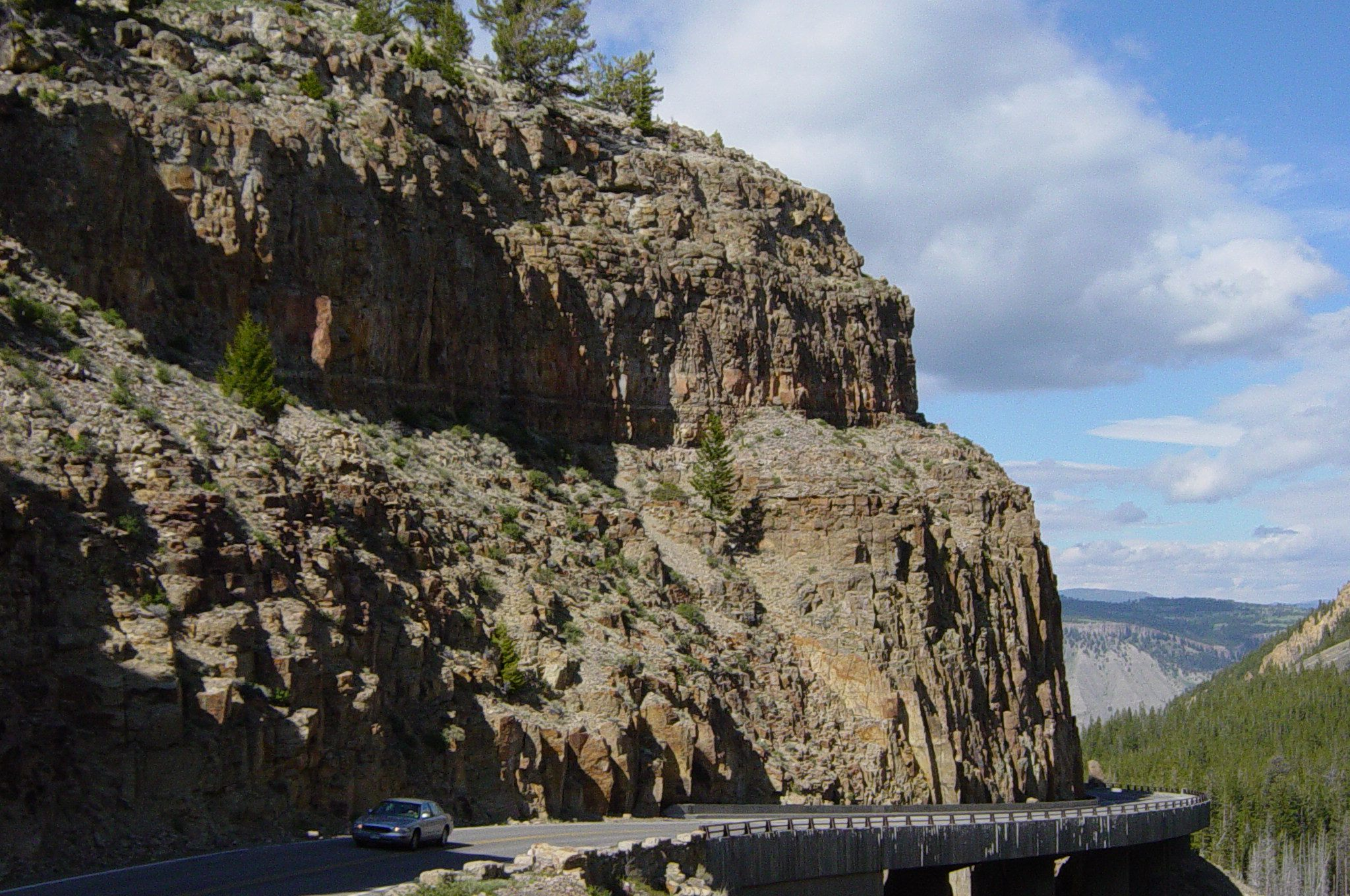
- The Huckleberry Ridge Tuff along the Gardner River near Osprey Falls, above Mammoth
- Volcano: Island Park Caldera
- Date: 2.1 million years ago
- Type: Plinian eruption
- Location: Idaho/Wyoming, United States; 44.33°N 111.33°W
- Volume: 2,450 km^{3} (590 mi^{3})
- VEI: 8

Maps
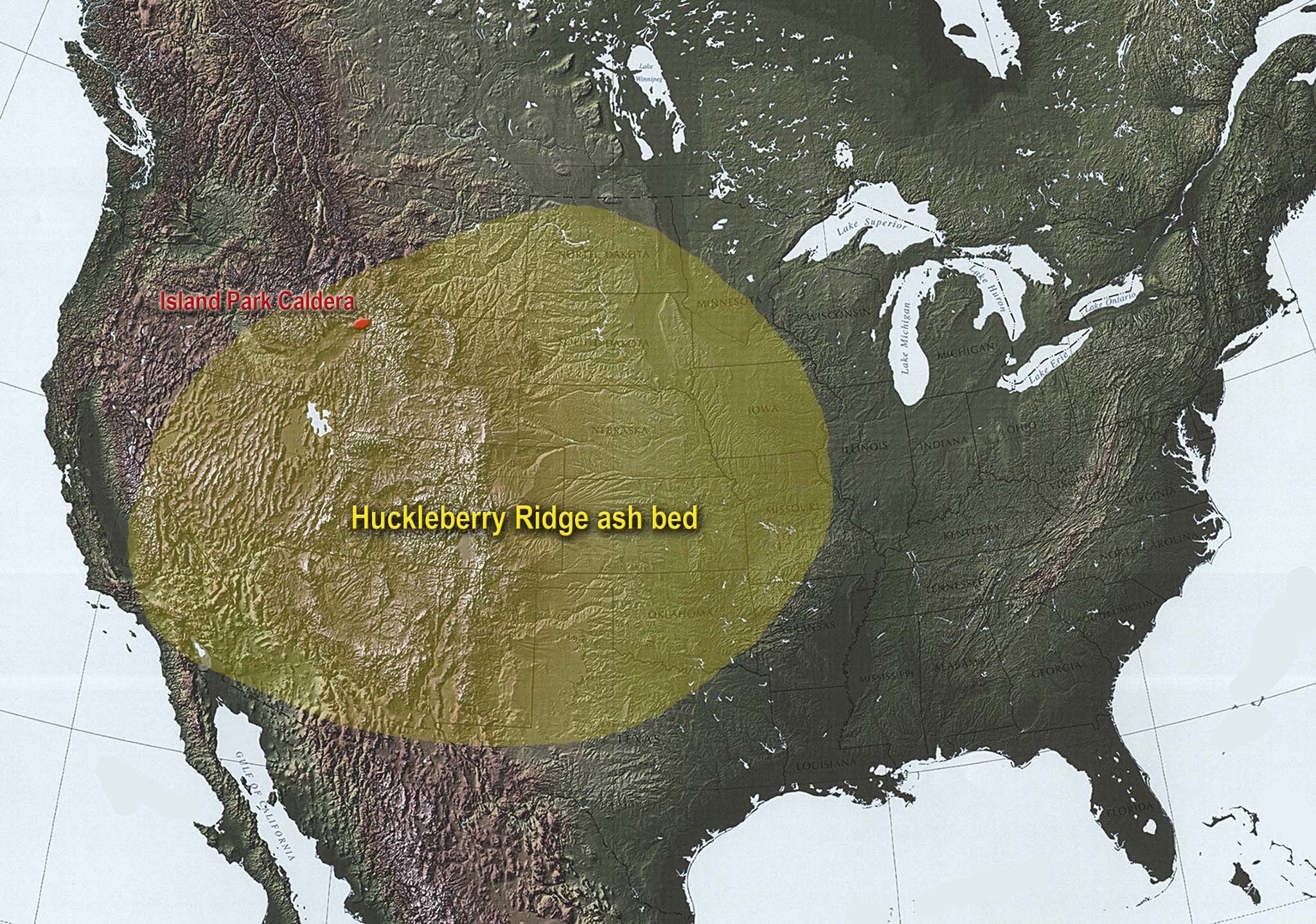
- Huckleberry Ridge ash bed

The Huckleberry Ridge Tuff is a tuff formation created by the Huckleberry Ridge eruption that formed the Island Park Caldera that lies partially in Yellowstone National Park, Wyoming and stretches westward into Idaho into a region known as Island Park. This eruption of 2,450 km^{3} (590 mi^{3}) of material is thought to be one of the largest known eruptions in the Yellowstone hotspot's history. This eruption, 2.1 million years ago, is the third most recent large caldera-forming eruption from the Yellowstone hotspot. It was followed by the Mesa Falls Tuff and the Lava Creek Tuff eruptions. The eruption likely occurred in 3 phases, separated by decades.

== See also ==
- Yellowstone Caldera
- Snake River Plain
- Island Park Caldera
- Henry's Fork Caldera
