= Island Park Caldera =

Large caldera in Yellowstone National Park

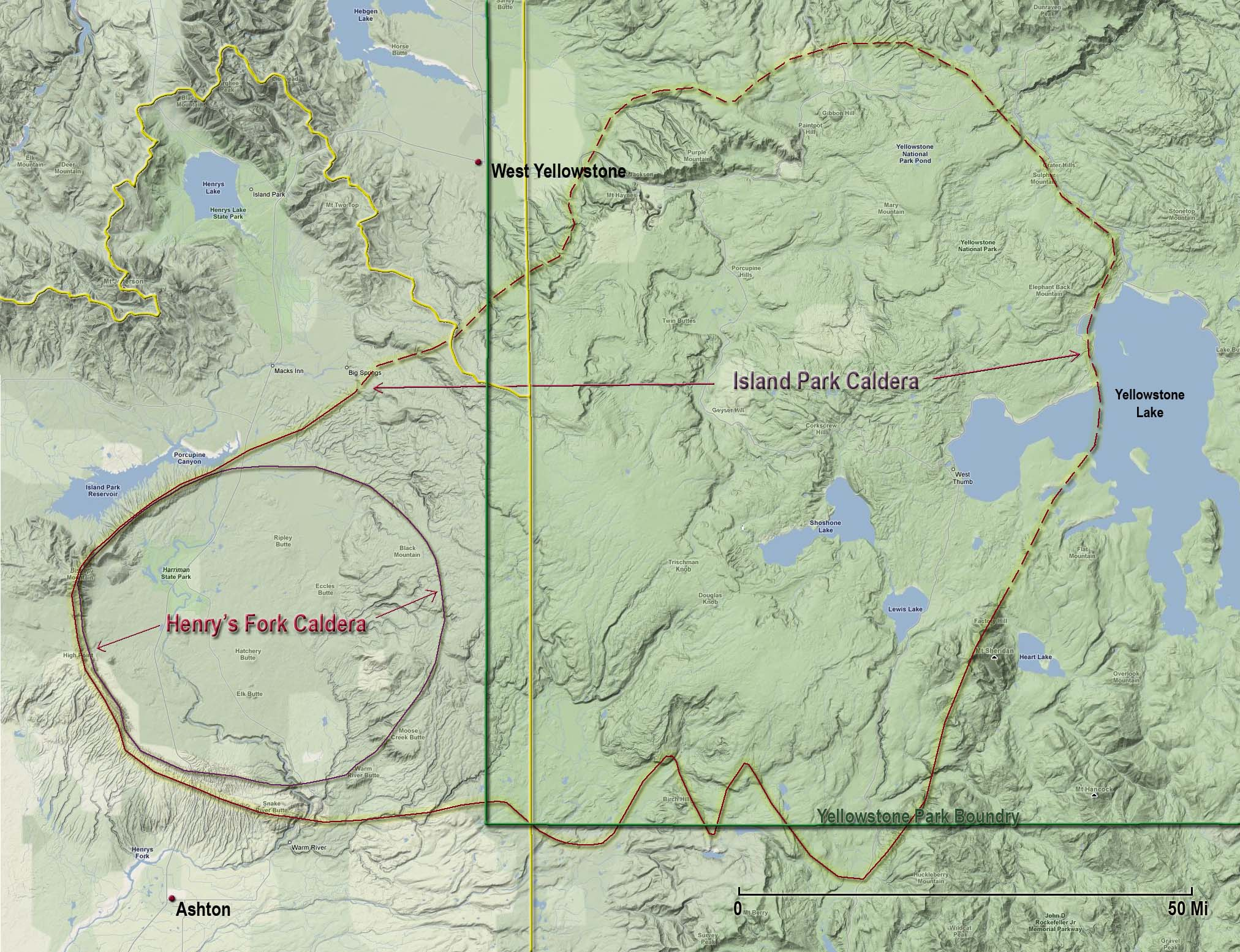
- Diagram of Island Park and Henry's Fork Caldera

Highest point
- Elevation: 2,805 m (9,203 ft)
- Coordinates: 44.33°N 111.33°W

Geography
- Location: Fremont County, Idaho, US

Geology
- Mountain type: Caldera
- Volcanic field: Yellowstone Plateau Volcanic Field
- Last eruption: 2.1 myr

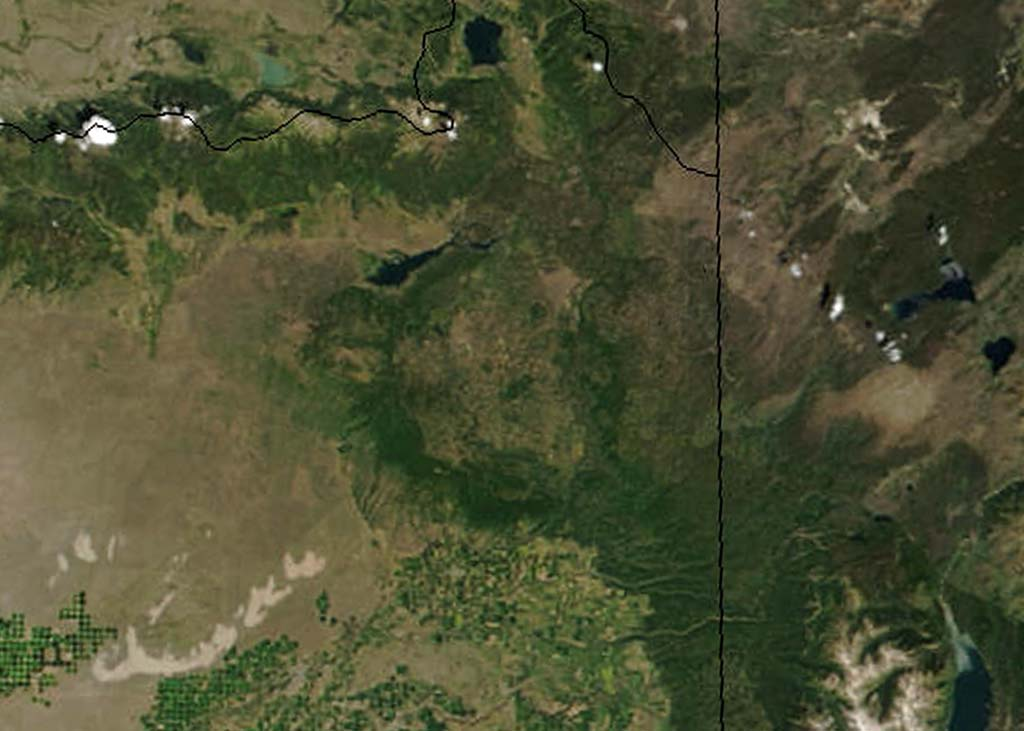
Left part of Island Park Caldera, with the circular structure of Henry's Fork Caldera in the center of this image

The Island Park Caldera, in the U.S. states of Idaho and Wyoming, is one of the world's largest calderas, with approximate dimensions of 80 by 65 km. Its ashfall is the source of the Huckleberry Ridge Tuff that is found from southern California to the Mississippi River near St. Louis. This super-eruption of approximately 2,500 km^{3} (600 cu mi) occurred 2.1 Ma (million years ago) and produced 2,500 times as much ash as the 1980 eruption of Mount St. Helens. Island Park Caldera has the smaller and younger Henry's Fork Caldera nested inside it.

The caldera clearly visible today is the later Henry's Fork Caldera, which is the source of the Mesa Falls Tuff. It was formed 1.3 Ma in an eruption of more than 280 km^{3} (67 cu mi). The two nested calderas share the same rim on their western sides, but the older Island Park Caldera is much larger and more oval and extends well into Yellowstone National Park. The Island Park Caldera is sometimes referred to as the First Phase Yellowstone Caldera or the Huckleberry Ridge Caldera.

To the southwest of the caldera lies the Snake River Plain, which was formed by a succession of older calderas marking the path of the Yellowstone hotspot. The plain is a depression, sinking under the weight of the volcanic rocks that formed it, through which the Snake River winds. Other observable volcanic features in the plain include: the Menan Buttes, the Big Southern Butte, Craters of the Moon, the Wapi Lava Field and Hell's Half Acre.

These calderas are in an area called Island Park that is known for beautiful forests, large springs, clear streams, waterfalls, lakes, ponds, marshes, wildlife, and fishing. Harriman State Park is located in the caldera. Snowmobiling, fishing, and Nordic skiing, and wildlife viewing are popular activities in the area. The peaks of the Teton Range to the southeast are visible from places in the caldera.

== See also ==
- Menan Buttes
- Yellowstone hotspot
