= Yellowstone Caldera =

Volcanic caldera in the United States

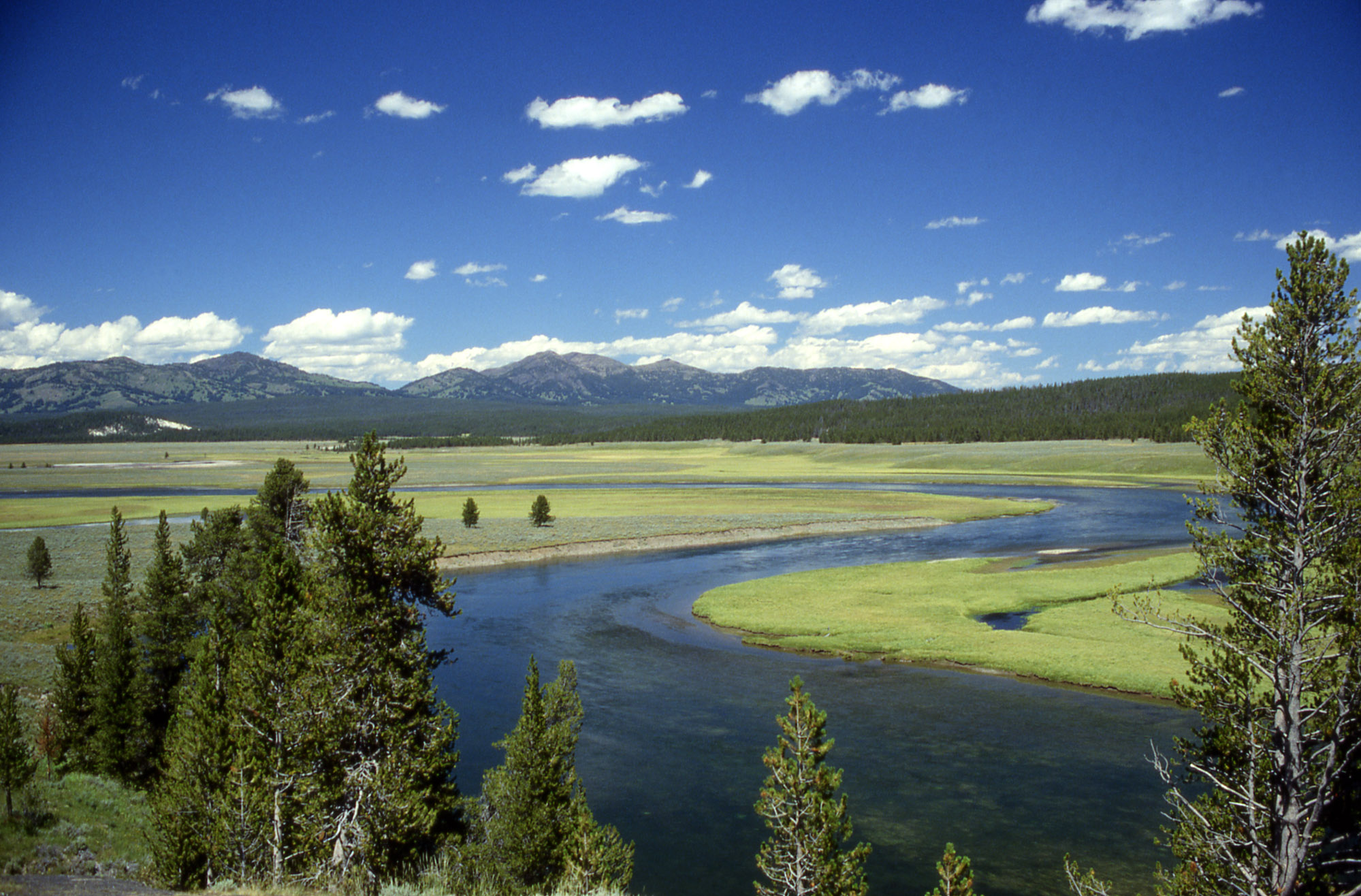
- The northeastern part of the Yellowstone Caldera, with the Yellowstone River flowing through Hayden Valley and the caldera rim in the distance

Highest point
- Elevation: 9,203 ft (2,805 m)
- Coordinates: 44°24′N 110°42′W

Geography
- Location: Yellowstone National Park, Wyoming, United States
- Parent range: Rocky Mountains
- Topo map: USGS Yellowstone National Park

Geology
- Rock age: 2,150,000–70,000 years
- Volcanic field: Yellowstone Plateau Volcanic Field
- Last eruption: 70,000 years ago

Climbing
- Easiest route: Hike/auto/bus

The Yellowstone Caldera, also known as the Yellowstone Plateau Volcanic Field, is a Quaternary volcanic field, caldera complex, and volcanic plateau spanning parts of Wyoming, Idaho, and Montana. It is driven by the Yellowstone hotspot and lies largely within Yellowstone National Park. The field comprises several overlapping caldera structures, multiple lava domes and resurgent domes, and numerous bimodal lavas and tuffs of basaltic and rhyolitic composition, originally covering about 17,000 km^{2} (6,600 mi^{2}).

Volcanism began 2.15 million years ago and proceeded through three major volcanic cycles. Each cycle involved a large ignimbrite eruption, widespread pyroclastic flows and ash fall, and caldera collapse, preceded and followed by smaller lava flows and tuffs. The climactic eruption of the first and largest cycle produced the Huckleberry Ridge Tuff about 2.08 million years ago and formed the first-cycle caldera complex. The second cycle culminated in eruption of the Mesa Falls Tuff and formation of the Henry's Fork Caldera about 1.3 million years ago. The most recent supereruption, about 631,000 years ago, produced the Lava Creek Tuff and created the present Yellowstone Caldera. Post-caldera eruptions included basalt flows, rhyolite domes and flows, and minor explosive deposits, with the last known magmatic eruption about 70,000 years ago. Large hydrothermal explosions also occurred during the Holocene.

The volcanic field remains active, with continuing earthquakes, ground deformation, and extensive hydrothermal activity driven by heat from the underlying magmatic system. The Yellowstone Volcano Observatory monitors the region and does not consider an eruption imminent. Imaging of the magmatic system indicates a substantial volume of partial melt beneath Yellowstone, although it is not presently considered eruptible.

== Geologic setting ==
The Yellowstone Plateau Volcanic Field lies at the eastern end of the Snake River Plain and disrupts the continuity of the Laramide orogenic belt, which formed during the Late Cretaceous. From about 53 to 43 million years ago, this area experienced significant andesitic volcanism exceeding 29,000 km^{3} (7,000 mi^{3}) in total volume, forming the Absaroka Volcanic Supergroup. Prominent peaks such as Mount Washburn and Eagle Peak are eroded remnants of these earlier stratovolcanoes. Before the formation of the Yellowstone Plateau, the Teton Range and Madison Range were likely structurally continuous, as were the Red Mountains and Gallatin Range.

Current Yellowstone volcanism is not a continuation of Laramide tectonism or the Absaroka volcanic province. Instead, it is the youngest part of a northeastward age progression of rhyolitic volcanic complexes along the Snake River Plain, extending at least 16 million years to the McDermitt caldera complex. Large rhyolitic tuff eruptions occurred at several of these older eruptive centers. The age progression is generally attributed to southwestward motion of the North American Plate relative to the Yellowstone hotspot.

The Yellowstone Plateau also lies along the northeastern margin of the extensional Basin and Range Province. Regional extension has accompanied the migration of volcanism toward Yellowstone and contributes to the active fault systems surrounding the plateau, including major normal faults north and south of the caldera. Regional extension persists across the volcanic field. Lidar mapping identified more than 1,000 extensional fault scarps across the Yellowstone Caldera and interpreted a north–south zone as kinematically linking the Teton Fault and East Gallatin fault systems.

The ultimate origin of the Yellowstone hotspot remains debated. Proposed explanations include upper-mantle processes related to the subducted Farallon plate, including slab rollback, rifting, and small-scale mantle convection, as well as deeper-mantle mechanisms. An alternative model invokes a long-lived mantle plume, potentially also related to emplacement of the Columbia River Basalt Group. Seismic tomography has imaged a broad thermal anomaly extending through the mantle beneath Yellowstone, which has been interpreted as supporting a deep-mantle origin.

== Volcanic landforms ==
The present landscape of the Yellowstone Plateau reflects overlapping caldera structures, resurgent uplift, thick lava flows, and subsequent modification by faulting, hydrothermal activity, glaciation, and erosion.

=== Caldera structures ===
The first-cycle caldera complex probably consisted of three partly overlapping collapse areas, termed the Big Bend Ridge, Snake River, and Red Mountains caldera segments. Its northern and eastern extent is uncertain because of burial by younger volcanic rocks, although it probably extended into the area of the third-cycle caldera, perhaps east of the Central Plateau. The Huckleberry Ridge Tuff in the Red Mountains is interpreted as thick intracaldera fill, and Big Bend Ridge at the southwestern edge of the volcanic plateau is inferred to be part of the first-cycle caldera wall. A fault along the Snake River and Glade Creek, bounding the northern end of the Teton Range and Huckleberry Ridge, is also interpreted as part of the first-cycle ring-fault system. It is not known whether any of the first-cycle caldera segments underwent resurgence.

The second-cycle collapse structure is the Henry's Fork Caldera. Thurmon Ridge at the northwestern edge of the volcanic plateau is inferred to be its northern caldera wall. The fault along Big Bend Ridge was reactivated during second-cycle collapse. Although basalt flows bury the southern and eastern boundary, a positive gravity anomaly indicates a nearly circular caldera about 19 km (12 mi) in diameter, with its southern boundary beneath the central Island Park basin.

Robert L. Christiansen reconstructed the Yellowstone Caldera as a compound structure comprising two partly overlapping collapse areas, traditionally associated with the Mallard Lake and Sour Creek structural highs. Its southwestern boundary is poorly constrained because it is buried by younger rhyolite flows. In the traditional reconstruction, the south flank of Purple Mountain and the Washburn Range, together with the western flank of the Absaroka Range, mark the northern and eastern margins, while Lake Butte, Flat Mountain Arm of Yellowstone Lake, the northern foothills of the Red Mountains, and Lewis Falls delineate parts of the southeastern and southern margin. The northeastern part of this reconstruction has subsequently been challenged. Mapping and geochronology initially suggested that the ring-fault lay west of the topographic high known as the Sour Creek dome, approximately along the Yellowstone River. More extensive remapping found that the Sour Creek high consists of several packages of Lava Creek Tuff-age ignimbrite rather than uplifted older rocks, while faults formerly attributed to resurgence also cut the much younger Elephant Back lava flow. The high is therefore interpreted as a domical accumulation of ignimbrite rather than a resurgent dome. Myers et al. consequently proposed that the northeastern Lava Creek collapse margin lies farther west than traditionally mapped, approximately along the Yellowstone River and near the northeastern margin of the older first-cycle caldera. Farther south, this proposed structural trend is approximately continued into northern Yellowstone Lake by the active Eagle Bay–Lake Hotel fault zone, of which the Lake Hotel graben is a segment. The fault zone had previously been interpreted as potentially related to the older Huckleberry Ridge caldera margin.

The western part of Yellowstone Lake contains the elliptical West Thumb basin. West Thumb is a 6 km × 8 km (3.7 mi × 5.0 mi) caldera nested within the larger Yellowstone Caldera and is interpreted to have formed during eruption of the tuff of Bluff Point about 160,000 years ago. Younger rhyolite flows partly buried its northeastern and southeastern margins, although the basin remains one of the deepest parts of Yellowstone Lake.

=== Resurgence and faulting ===
The Mallard Lake area preserves clear evidence of structural resurgence. The elliptical Mallard Lake dome, about 11 km × 19 km (6.8 mi × 11.8 mi), uplifts the Mallard Lake lava flow and part of the older Scaup Lake flow and is cut by a complex northwest-trending axial graben. The principal exposed phase of doming occurred around 160,000 years ago, although earlier post-collapse resurgence was inferred by Christiansen to be buried beneath younger volcanic rocks.

The resurgent origin of the Sour Creek dome has been questioned. Myers et al. inferred that the mapped faulting substantially postdates emplacement of the Sour Creek ignimbrites and interpreted the dome's topographic relief primarily as a low-angle, asymmetric accumulation of ignimbrite rather than structural resurgence. The Sour Creek area nevertheless continues to undergo modern deformation associated with the active Yellowstone magmatic and hydrothermal system.

=== Lava plateaus ===
Much of the present relief within the Yellowstone Caldera is constructional, formed by thick post-caldera rhyolite lava flows rather than by the caldera rim itself. Flows of the Central Plateau Member of the Plateau Rhyolite form much of the Madison Plateau, Pitchstone Plateau, Central Plateau, and Solfatara Plateau, producing broad, relatively flat or gently domed uplands bounded locally by steep lava-flow fronts. Representative volcanic exposures elsewhere in the field include Obsidian Cliff, an exposure of obsidian-rich rhyolite, and Sheepeater Cliff, where columnar-jointed basalt is exposed.

=== Landscape evolution ===
The modern landscape of the volcanic field reflects erosion, glaciation, sedimentation, and hydrothermal alteration superimposed on the constructional volcanic terrain. Rhyolitic lava flows underlie much of Yellowstone Lake and exert a major control on its bathymetry. Bathymetric and magnetic data indicate that Stevenson, Dot, and Frank islands are underlain by large-volume rhyolite flows mantled by late Pleistocene glaciolacustrine sediments.

The Yellowstone River has incised the Grand Canyon of the Yellowstone through post-caldera volcanic rocks. Hydrothermal alteration weakened the rhyolite and tuff and produced the characteristic yellow, orange, and red rocks exposed in the canyon walls, while river erosion and episodes of enhanced erosion following glaciation helped develop the modern canyon. The Upper Falls and Lower Falls occur where the river crosses more resistant volcanic rocks, with the Lower Falls marking the upstream end of the modern deep canyon.

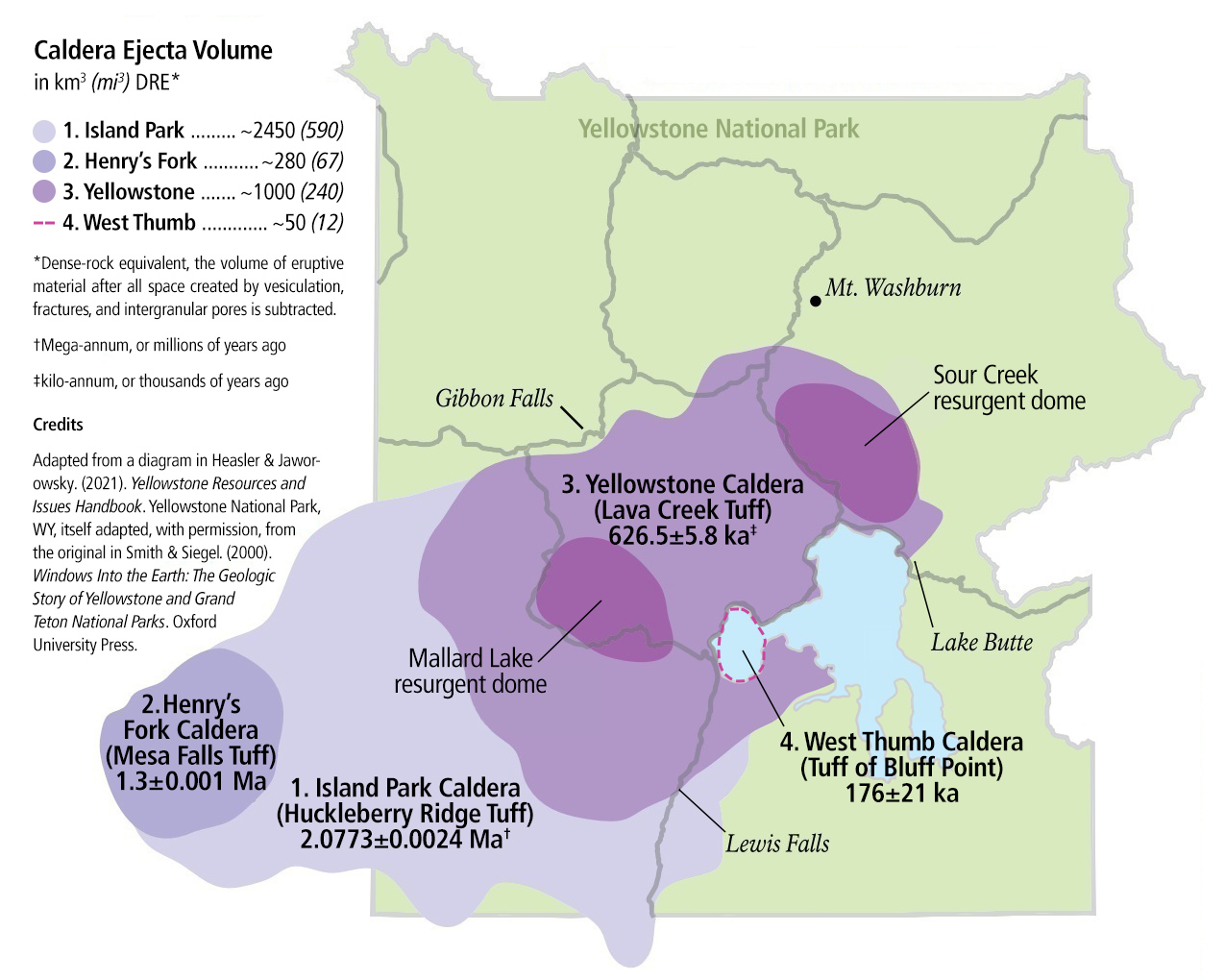
Yellowstone sits on top of four overlapping calderas (U.S. National Park Service).

== Eruption history ==
A total of about 6,500 km^{3} (1,600 mi^{3}) of rhyolite and 250 km^{3} (60 mi^{3}) of basalt were emplaced in the Yellowstone Plateau Volcanic Field between about 2.15 million and 0.07 million years ago. The rhyolitic volcanism is conventionally divided into three major volcanic cycles, each centered on a large caldera-forming eruption. In broad outline, each cycle included precaldera rhyolitic lavas and tuffs, a climactic eruption of a voluminous rhyolitic ash-flow tuff accompanied by caldera collapse, and postcaldera rhyolitic volcanism. Basaltic volcanism occurred intermittently, chiefly around the margins of the volcanic plateau, and is conventionally discussed with the three rhyolitic cycles. The three caldera-forming ash-flow sheets account for more than half of the total volcanic volume of the Yellowstone Plateau.

Major caldera-forming eruptions of the Yellowstone Plateau Volcanic Field
Volcanic cycle	Caldera-forming tuff	Age	Ash-flow volume	Collapse structure
First	Huckleberry Ridge Tuff	~2.08 Ma	>2,450 km^{3} (590 mi^{3})	First-cycle caldera complex
Second	Mesa Falls Tuff	~1.30 Ma	>280 km^{3} (67 mi^{3})	Henry's Fork Caldera
Third	Lava Creek Tuff	~0.63 Ma	>1,000 km^{3} (240 mi^{3})	Yellowstone Caldera

=== First volcanic cycle ===
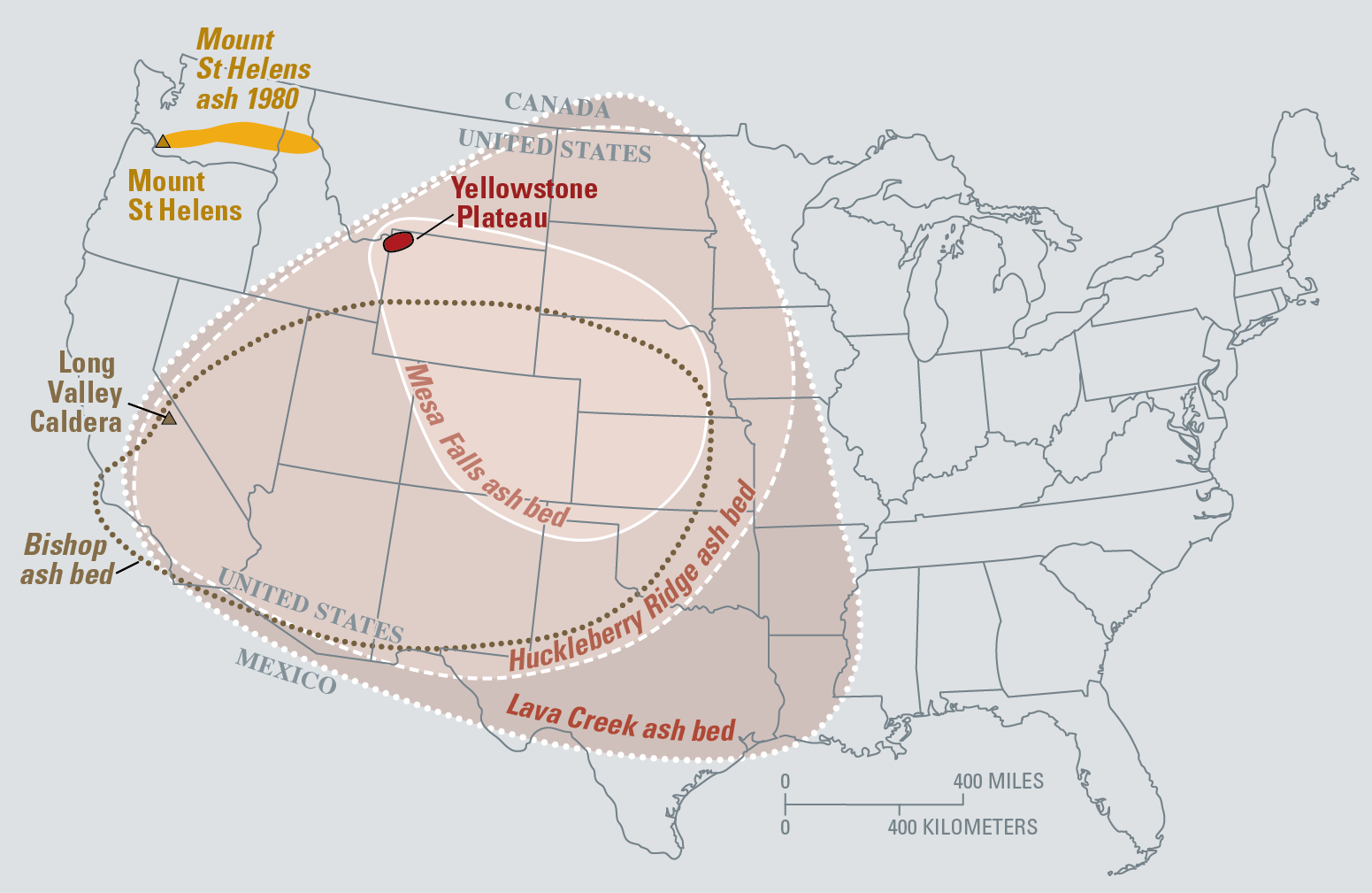
Map of the known ash-fall boundaries for major Pleistocene eruptions in Southwest US. By Volcano Hazards Program

The first volcanic cycle lasted from about 2.15 million to 1.95 million years ago, spanning approximately 200 kyr. The only known precaldera rhyolitic unit is the Rhyolite of Snake River Butte, located just north of Ashton and dated at 2.1398±0.0035 million years, roughly 60–70 kyr before the caldera-forming Huckleberry Ridge Tuff. Its vent lies near the eventual first-cycle caldera margin close to the Big Bend Bridge. Additional rhyolite flows may have erupted along the incipient ring-fault, but the known precaldera rhyolitic history spans no more than about 70 kyr. Zircon petrochronology indicates that some crystals in the Huckleberry Ridge Tuff were recycled from precaldera rhyolites, linking the precursory magmatism to the later caldera-forming system. A broadly contemporaneous plateau-margin basaltic unit is the 60 to 70 m (230 ft)-thick Junction Butte Basalt on the northeastern margin of the plateau, dated at 2.16±0.04 million years. The Overhanging Cliff basalt is a flow of this unit.

The first-cycle caldera-forming event was the eruption of the Huckleberry Ridge Tuff at about 2.08 million years ago. Member B, which records transitional magnetic polarity associated with the Huckleberry Ridge geomagnetic excursion, has a high-precision ^{40}Ar/^{39}Ar sanidine age of about 2.0773±0.0034 million years. The Huckleberry Ridge Tuff exceeds 1 km (0.62 mi) in thickness in the Red Mountains area. The opening Plinian phase deposited up to 2.5 m (8.2 ft) of fallout ash at Mount Everts before widespread ignimbrite deposition began. Field and compositional evidence indicates that this opening phase was intermittent, sourced from multiple vents, and lasted several weeks. Glass compositions distinguish four melt-dominant compositional clusters in the fall deposits, increasing to nine melt-dominant domains at the onset of widespread ignimbrite deposition; about 50 km^{3} (12 mi^{3}) of magma had been discharged before caldera collapse began with the transition to the first major ignimbrite. The resulting composite ignimbrite sheet consists of three members, A, B, and C, with an estimated ash-flow volume of more than about 2,450 km^{3} (590 mi^{3}), excluding widespread distal fallout and incompletely exposed intracaldera deposits. Geochemical and isotopic data indicate that the eruption as a whole tapped four broader magmatic systems sequentially or simultaneously, each containing one or more melt-dominant bodies. Member A likely vented from the central part of the plateau and tapped two of these systems. After a hiatus of weeks to months, the most voluminous Member B erupted from north of Big Bend Ridge, principally tapping one of the earlier systems after mixing and reorganization that accompanied mafic magma input. After another break of years to decades, Member C involved rejuvenation of the other earlier system as well as two newly tapped magmatic systems. The least voluminous Member C may have vented near the Red Mountains, where it is about 430 m (1,410 ft) thick. Some outcrops of Members A and C have been misidentified as Member B, complicating estimates of the volumes of the individual ash-flow units.

Distal tephra from the eruption is known as the Huckleberry Ridge ash bed (formerly "Pearlette type B"). Glen A. Izett estimated that possibly as much as 2,000 km^{3} (480 mi^{3}) of additional ash was carried far downwind from the source region, based on the distribution and thickness of the Huckleberry Ridge ash. This is a rough estimate of the distal fallout, distinct from the reconstructed volume of the proximal ash-flow sheet. The known fallout distribution covers about 3,400,000 km^{2} (1,300,000 mi^{2}), and Huckleberry Ridge ash has been identified in the Pacific Ocean at Deep Sea Drilling Project Site 36, about 1,600 km (990 mi) from the source area, as well as in the Humboldt and Ventura basins of coastal California, near Afton in Iowa, Benson in Arizona, and Campo Grande Mountain in Texas.

Postcaldera first-cycle rhyolites include the Sheridan Reservoir Rhyolite and the Blue Creek and Headquarters flows near the northern end of Big Bend Ridge. The Sheridan Reservoir Rhyolite has a U–Pb zircon age of 2.07±0.19 million years and was reassigned from the older Heise volcanic field to the Yellowstone Plateau Volcanic Field on the basis of its age, trace-element and isotopic composition, and low-δ^{18}O signature. If it erupted from the first-cycle ring-fracture system, it traveled at least 20 km (12 mi); its volume has been estimated to exceed about 10 km^{3} (2.4 mi^{3}). The Blue Creek flow and overlying Headquarters flow have a combined lava volume of 10–20 km^{3} (2.4–4.8 mi^{3}) and erupted at 1.9811±0.0035 million years and 1.9476±0.0037 million years ago, respectively. Both are strongly low-δ^{18}O rhyolites, recording a pronounced oxygen-isotope shift in Yellowstone silicic magmatism following first-cycle caldera collapse.

=== Second volcanic cycle ===
After approximately 500 kyr of apparent volcanic quiescence following the end of the first cycle, rhyolitic volcanism resumed near the western part of the older caldera complex. The Bishop Mountain Flow erupted at 1.4578±0.0016 million years ago and was followed by the Tuff of Lyle Spring at 1.4502±0.0027 million years ago. The Bishop Mountain Flow is a high-silica rhyolite with an approximate mapped surface volume of 23 km^{3} (5.5 mi^{3}) and reaches a thickness of about 375 m (1,230 ft) along the inner caldera wall. The mapped exposure of the Tuff of Lyle Spring has a volume of about 1 km^{3} (0.24 mi^{3}) and consists of two distinguishable cooling units. Although these units were historically grouped with the precaldera rhyolites of the second volcanic cycle, geochronologic, geochemical, and isotopic data indicate that they originated from a distinct, highly evolved magmatic system, termed the Lyle Spring magmatic system, rather than from the later Mesa Falls magma reservoir. Sanidine antecrysts in the Tuff of Lyle Spring are as much as about 20 kyr older than the eruption and record repeated magmatic pulses during development of this small-volume system.

Following another interval of roughly 100 kyr, volcanism associated with the Mesa Falls magmatic system began. The Green Canyon Flow, north of Big Bend Ridge, has an approximate mapped surface volume of 5 km^{3} (1.2 mi^{3}) and is dated at 1.2989±0.0009 million years ago. Its age is indistinguishable within uncertainty from that of the subsequent Mesa Falls Tuff, but the flow is truncated by the Henry's Fork Caldera fracture, demonstrating that it predates caldera collapse. Its isotopic composition indicates that it was related to the Mesa Falls magmatic system rather than to the older Lyle Spring system.

The second-cycle caldera-forming eruption produced the Mesa Falls Tuff at about 1.30 million years ago; high-precision ^{40}Ar/^{39}Ar dating gives an eruption age of 1.3001±0.0006 million years. Zircon petrochronology indicates that the Mesa Falls magmatic system differentiated over less than about 30 kyr, with most zircon crystallization occurring within approximately 10 kyr of eruption. At the type area near Ashton, the eruption began with about 5 m (16 ft) of Plinian pumice and ash fallout, followed by an approximately 1 m (3.3 ft) crystal-rich pyroclastic-surge deposit and then the main ash-flow eruption. The resulting ignimbrite forms a single major cooling unit. It reaches about 150 m (490 ft) in its thickest known section on Thurmon Ridge and was emplaced over an inferred area of nearly 2,700 km^{2} (1,000 mi^{2}). Christiansen reconstructed an initial ash-flow-tuff volume of more than about 280 km^{3} (67 mi^{3}), assuming approximately average thickness where the deposit is concealed within the older first-cycle caldera; deeper intracaldera ponding could make the actual ash-flow volume substantially greater. This estimate does not include the widespread distal fallout.

The distal fallout is known as the Mesa Falls ash bed (formerly "Pearlette type S"). It has been identified in Nebraska and the southern Rocky Mountains of Colorado, and some Mesa Falls ash was subsequently reworked into ash-rich sediments as far away as the Gulf of Mexico. Unlike the Huckleberry Ridge ash bed, no comparably well-established quantitative reconstruction of the total distal fallout volume is available.

Petrologic studies indicate that the Mesa Falls magma was stored at approximately 5–8 km (3.1–5.0 mi) depth and 750–800 °C (1,380–1,470 °F) before eruption. Quartz-hosted melt inclusions and embayments record slow, fluid-saturated decompression before rapid eruptive ascent and have been interpreted as possible evidence for pre-eruptive CO_{2} fluxing from deeper basaltic magma.

Postcaldera rhyolitic eruptions included the Moonshine Mountain dome and five crystal-rich domes collectively known as the Island Park Rhyolite. The Moonshine Mountain dome has an approximate mapped surface volume of 2.5 km^{3} (0.60 mi^{3}) and an ^{40}Ar/^{39}Ar age of 1.3017±0.0019 million years. Although its numerical age overlaps that of the Mesa Falls Tuff, field relations place its eruption after formation of the Henry's Fork Caldera. Earlier work related Moonshine Mountain to the much older Bishop Mountain magma source, but later Pb-isotope and geochemical data instead linked it to the 1.30 Ma Mesa Falls magmatic system, together with the Green Canyon Flow and Island Park Rhyolite. The Island Park Rhyolite comprises the Silver Lake, Osborne Butte, Elk Butte, Lookout Butte, and Warm River Butte domes. Together they have an estimated lava volume of about 1–2 km^{3} (0.24–0.48 mi^{3}). High-precision dating and paleomagnetic data indicate that all five erupted within a few centuries at about 1.2905±0.0020 million years ago, rather than during a prolonged sequence lasting tens of thousands of years. Lookout Butte lies near the older Big Bend Ridge caldera wall, while the other four vents define a northwest-trending, structurally controlled zone about 30 km (19 mi) long and no more than 7 km (4.3 mi) wide. Their close temporal clustering and isotopic relationship to the Mesa Falls Tuff indicate rapid regeneration of small eruptible rhyolite bodies from the postcaldera magmatic system.

Mafic volcanism continued in and around the Henry's Fork Caldera after the second-cycle rhyolitic eruptions. New ^{40}Ar/^{39}Ar ages show that basaltic volcanism there occurred in several later episodes overlapping subsequent rhyolitic activity, including eruption of the Warm River and Shotgun Valley basalts at about 1.17 million years ago. The temporal association has been interpreted as evidence that renewed basaltic input supplied heat to the shallow rhyolitic magmatic system, although the basaltic eruptions are not themselves treated as discrete components of the rhyolitic volcanic cycles.

=== Third volcanic cycle ===
The third volcanic cycle encompasses the rhyolitic volcanism associated with development of the Yellowstone magmatic system before, during, and after the caldera-forming Lava Creek Tuff eruption. The cycle culminated in eruption of the Lava Creek Tuff and formation of the Yellowstone Caldera about 631,000 years ago, following several hundred thousand years of precaldera rhyolitic volcanism.

==== Precaldera volcanism ====
Precaldera third-cycle silicic rocks are broadly divided into the Mount Jackson Rhyolite and the Lewis Canyon Rhyolite. Most known Mount Jackson flows lie near the margins of the later Yellowstone Caldera, with vents in or near what subsequently became its ring-fracture zone. The earliest securely dated lava generally assigned to the third cycle is the Wapiti Lake flow, dated at 1.2187±0.0158 million years, exposed near the Grand Canyon of the Yellowstone and likely vented near Wapiti Lake.

The Moose Creek Butte flow is also assigned to the Mount Jackson Rhyolite, but its eruption age and volcanic-cycle affinity are uncertain. Troch et al. obtained an age of 1.2856±0.0066 million years and interpreted the flow as essentially contemporaneous with the postcaldera Island Park Rhyolite, suggesting that it may represent a late second-cycle eruption. Later analyses yielded a complex distribution of sanidine ages, with the youngest population dated at 1.1462±0.0022 million years, but did not allow a reliable eruption age to be determined. Pumice from an unidentified tuff unit at Broad Creek has yielded ages ranging from 0.948±0.016 million years to 1.11±0.02 million years. Later Mount Jackson eruptions include the Flat Mountain Rhyolite (0.929±0.034 million years) and the Harlequin Lake flow (0.8300±0.0072 million years).

The Lewis Canyon Rhyolite, which is petrographically distinct from the Mount Jackson Rhyolite and occurs farther south, contains lava dated to 0.8263±0.0184 million years. Christiansen suggested that, despite erupting during the third-cycle interval, its unusual composition and position within a first-cycle caldera segment might indicate derivation from a local residuum of first-cycle magma.

Recent remapping near the Gibbon River at Madison Junction identified a dense, black, glassy vitrophyre that had previously been mapped as part of the Lava Creek Tuff. ^{40}Ar/^{39}Ar dating instead places the unit at about 0.79 million years ago, within the age range of the Mount Jackson Rhyolite. The unit is interpreted as probably representing a smaller explosive eruption, demonstrating that precaldera Mount Jackson volcanism was not exclusively effusive. A chronostratigraphic reassessment of the Lava Creek Tuff similarly identified an amphibole-bearing tuff previously mapped as Lava Creek Tuff Member A that yielded an age of about 0.796 million years, substantially older than the Lava Creek eruption. A separate, 20–30 cm thick pyroclastic layer between a Mount Jackson lava and the overlying Lava Creek Tuff may record another explosive Mount Jackson eruption, although it remains undated. An explosive eruption also deposited pumiceous fallout near Harlequin Lake, which is immediately overlain by the Mount Haynes lava, dated at 0.7016±0.0014 million years. An ash bed from a Yellowstone eruption was deposited in the Great Salt Lake approximately 0.7 million years ago.

The age of the Big Bear Lake flow is uncertain, but it lies beneath the third-cycle caldera-forming Lava Creek Tuff. Additional Mount Jackson flows may be buried within the Yellowstone Caldera, inferred from intracaldera topography.

==== Lava Creek Tuff and caldera formation ====
The climactic ash-flow eruption of the third cycle was the Lava Creek Tuff, dated at 0.6313±0.0043 million years, near the transition from Marine Isotope Stage 16 to 15. The composite tuff sheet was traditionally divided into two members, distinguishable by a widely occurring decrease in welding intensity between them, and represents a total ash-flow volume of about 1,000 km^{3} (240 mi^{3}). In the traditional interpretation, Member A likely erupted south of Purple Mountain, where it reaches its greatest thickness of 430 m (1,410 ft) and exhibits maximum welding. The Purple Mountain to Gibbon Canyon segment of caldera wall collapsed after the emplacement of Member A but before it completely cooled. A 20–30 cm (7.9–11.8 in) loose crystal ash unit separates Member A from Member B, indicating a break in the eruption sufficiently long for cooling of thick ash-flows. A 3 m (9.8 ft) thick pumiceous ash-fall deposit underlies Member B and probably marks its initial phase. Member B ash-flows extend radially outward along paleovalleys and more extensive plateau segments, and its eruptive center was inferred to lie farther east than that of Member A.

Petrologic and geochronologic studies indicate that the Lava Creek magmatic system was assembled from multiple magma bodies rather than existing as a single long-lived, homogeneous magma chamber. Zircons from samples traditionally assigned to Members A and B have distinct oxygen- and hafnium-isotope compositions, interpreted as recording coexisting but physically separated reservoirs that were themselves assembled from smaller, isotopically heterogeneous magma batches involving mantle-derived magma and crustal melts. Preservation of these isotopic differences indicates that the large upper-crustal reservoirs were assembled and stored on timescales of roughly 10^{3}–10^{4} years before eruption. Zircon interiors record a longer crystallization history of about 35,000 years, while reverse and abrupt trace-element zoning records episodic reheating, renewed crystallization and magma input; highly evolved zircon cores also indicate remelting of near-solidus material during growth of the eruptible system. In material traditionally assigned to Member B, sanidine and quartz zoning has been interpreted as recording the injection of more juvenile silicic magma into a pre-existing crystal mush, followed by decompression and crystal-rim growth within a few decades or less before eruption. This rejuvenation was proposed as a possible eruption trigger, with volatile exsolution during subsequent ascent supplying additional overpressure.

This picture of a heterogeneous, multi-body magmatic system is consistent with more recent stratigraphic and geochemical work that has challenged whether the traditional two-member subdivision adequately describes the Lava Creek Tuff throughout its distribution. Amphibole, traditionally considered characteristic of Member A and absent from Member B, was found mostly in material mapped as Member B. Sanidine geochemical analyses likewise found that Or content, barium concentrations and lead-isotope compositions vary principally between samples and localities rather than according to their existing assignment to Members A and B. These results suggest that, although Members A and B remain useful traditional mapping units defined in part by welding relationships, the widespread Lava Creek Tuff may consist of multiple eruptive lobes derived from distinct magma bodies rather than only two regionally consistent eruptive sheets.

Additional complexity is recorded locally at the Sour Creek dome. Remapping there identified five ignimbrite packages with an average age of 0.6315±0.0009 million years, indistinguishable within analytical uncertainty from the Lava Creek Tuff. The oldest, package 1, is preserved only as cooled recycled ignimbrite clasts within a lag breccia; these clasts are petrographically and geochemically indistinguishable from conventionally mapped Lava Creek Tuff north of the caldera and are interpreted as material from the main, widespread Lava Creek eruption. On this interpretation, packages 2–5 were erupted after the main Lava Creek Tuff had cooled sufficiently to be fragmented and incorporated into the younger deposits. None of these four younger packages can presently be correlated with the widespread extracaldera Lava Creek outflow lobes and they appear to have been largely localized around Sour Creek dome, although package 2 has also been recognized immediately northeast of the traditionally mapped caldera boundary. Sanidine compositions and deposit characteristics indicate that at least four distinct, crystal-poor magma bodies supplied the local Sour Creek sequence.

The ash fallout from the Lava Creek Tuff eruption is known as the Lava Creek ash bed (formerly "Pearlette type O"), covering an area exceeding 3,000,000–4,000,000 km^{2} (1,200,000–1,500,000 mi^{2}). Perkins and Nash (2002) estimated that the volume of this ash bed is greater than 500 km^{3} (120 mi^{3}). It has been identified in the Gulf of Mexico, near Regina, Saskatchewan, in Ventura, California, and in Viola Center, Iowa.

==== Postcaldera volcanism ====
Post-collapse rhyolites likely erupted shortly after the Lava Creek Tuff. The subaerial post-collapse silicic rocks are collectively referred to as the Plateau Rhyolite, which primarily consists of lava flows. Plateau Rhyolite is divided into three intracaldera members—Upper Basin Member, Mallard Lake Member, and Central Plateau Member—and two extracaldera members—Obsidian Creek Member and Roaring Mountain Member. It is likely that rhyolitic pumice and ash were erupted during the opening of vents for each of these lava flows. The earliest intracaldera rhyolite, the East Biscuit Basin Flow of the Upper Basin Member, is dated to 0.635±0.014 million years, followed by felsic lithic clasts of an unknown unit (0.6±0.02 million years) in Yellowstone Lake, and the North Biscuit Basin Flow (0.580±0.040 million years). The earliest extracaldera rhyolite is the Riverside Flow (0.5258±0.0033 million years) of the Roaring Mountain Member, broadly contemporaneous with the Middle Biscuit Basin Flow (0.527±0.028 million years). Two ash-flow tuff units of the Upper Basin Member include the 35 m (115 ft)-thick Tuff of Uncle Tom's Trail and the 230 m (750 ft)-thick Tuff of Sulphur Creek, the latter dated at 0.479±0.02 million years. Tuff of Sulphur Creek is at least 13 km^{3} (3.1 mi^{3}). These tuffs were deposited on the north flank of the Sour Creek dome. The Canyon lava flows of the Upper Basin Member erupted immediately after the Tuff of Sulphur Creek, as the ash-flow was still hot at the time of emplacement. Both the Tuff of Sulphur Creek and Canyon flows originated from a vent near Fern Lake. The two tuffs and Canyon flows have a combined magma volume of 40–70 km^{3} (9.6–16.8 mi^{3}). The Dunraven Road Flow (0.486±0.042 million years) of the Upper Basin Member overlies the Canyon flows and may have had an extracaldera vent. The Cougar Creek lava dome of the Roaring Mountain Member erupted 0.358±0.002 million years north of the caldera. Four additional lava flows of the Obsidian Creek Member—Willow Park dome, Apollinaris Spring dome, Gardner River complex, and Grizzly Lake complex—erupted between 0.326±0.002 million years and 0.263±0.003 million years, in the vicinity of Norris Geyser Basin northward toward Mammoth Hot Springs. The South Biscuit Basin Flow of the Upper Basin Member erupted 0.257±0.009 million years ago. The Scaup Lake Flow of the Upper Basin Member is dated to 0.244±0.009 million years, while the Landmark dome of the Obsidian Creek Member is 0.226±0.006 million years.

Non-explosive eruptions of lava and less-violent explosive eruptions have occurred in and near the Yellowstone caldera since the last supereruption. The most recent lava flow occurred about 70,000 years ago, while a violent eruption excavated the West Thumb of Lake Yellowstone 174,000 years ago. Smaller steam explosions occur as well. An explosion 13,800 years ago left a 5 km (3.1 mi) diameter crater at Mary Bay on the edge of Yellowstone Lake (located in the center of the caldera). Currently, volcanic activity is exhibited via numerous geothermal vents scattered throughout the region, including the famous Old Faithful Geyser, plus recorded ground-swelling indicating ongoing inflation of the underlying magma chamber.

== Hazards ==
=== Earthquakes ===
Incidence of earthquakes in Yellowstone National Park region (1973–2014)

Volcanic and tectonic actions in the region cause between 1,000 and 2,000 measurable earthquakes annually. Most are relatively minor, measuring magnitude 3 or weaker. Occasionally, numerous earthquakes are detected in a relatively short period of time, an event known as an earthquake swarm. In 1985, more than 3,000 earthquakes were measured over a period of several months. More than 70 smaller swarms were detected between 1983 and 2008. The USGS states these swarms are likely caused by slips on pre-existing faults rather than by movements of magma or hydrothermal fluids.

In December 2008, continuing into January 2009, more than 500 earthquakes were detected under the northwest end of Yellowstone Lake over a seven-day span, with the largest registering a magnitude of 3.9. Another swarm started in January 2010, after the Haiti earthquake and before the Chile earthquake. With 1,620 small earthquakes between January 17, 2010, and February 1, 2010, this swarm was the second-largest ever recorded in the Yellowstone Caldera. The largest of these shocks was a magnitude 3.8 that occurred on January 21, 2010. This swarm subsided to background levels by February 21. On March 30, 2014, at 6:34 AM MST, a magnitude 4.8 earthquake struck Yellowstone, the largest recorded there since February 1980. In February 2018, more than 300 earthquakes occurred, with the largest being a magnitude 2.9.

=== Volcanoes ===
Diagram of the Yellowstone Caldera

The Lava Creek eruption of the Yellowstone Caldera, which occurred 640,000 years ago, ejected approximately 1,000 cubic kilometres (240 mi^{3}) of rock, dust and volcanic ash into the atmosphere. It was Yellowstone's third and most recent caldera-forming eruption.

Geologists closely monitor the elevation of the Yellowstone Plateau, which has been rising as quickly as 150 millimetres (5.9 in) per year, as an indirect measurement of changes in magma chamber pressure.

The upward movement of the Yellowstone caldera floor between 2004 and 2008—almost 75 millimetres (3.0 in) each year—was more than three times greater than ever observed since such measurements began in 1923. From 2004 to 2008, the land surface within the caldera moved upward as much as 8 inches (20 cm) at the White Lake GPS station. In January 2010, the USGS stated that "uplift of the Yellowstone Caldera has slowed significantly" and that uplift continues but at a slower pace. USGS, University of Utah and National Park Service scientists with the Yellowstone Volcano Observatory maintain that they "see no evidence that another such cataclysmic eruption will occur at Yellowstone in the foreseeable future. Recurrence intervals of these events are neither regular nor predictable." This conclusion was reiterated in December 2013 in the aftermath of the publication of a study by University of Utah scientists finding that the "size of the magma body beneath Yellowstone is significantly larger than had been thought". The Yellowstone Volcano Observatory issued a statement on its website stating:

Although fascinating, the new findings do not imply increased geologic hazards at Yellowstone, and certainly do not increase the chances of a "super eruption" in the near future. Contrary to some media reports, Yellowstone is not "overdue" for a super eruption.

Media reports were more hyperbolic in their coverage.

A study published in GSA Today, the monthly news and science magazine of the Geological Society of America, identified three fault zones where future eruptions are most likely to be centered. Two of those areas are associated with lava flows aged 174,000–70,000 years ago, and the third is a focus of present-day seismicity.

In 2017, NASA conducted a study to determine the feasibility of preventing the volcano from erupting. The results suggested that cooling the magma chamber by 35 percent would be enough to forestall such an incident. NASA proposed introducing water at high pressure 10 kilometers underground. The circulating water would release heat at the surface, possibly in a way that could be used as a geothermal power source. If enacted, the plan would cost about $3.46 billion. Brian Wilcox of the Jet Propulsion Laboratory observes that such a project could incidentally trigger an eruption if the top of the chamber is drilled into.

According to analysis of earthquake data in 2013, the magma chamber is 80 km (50 mi) long and 20 km (12 mi) wide. It also has 4,000 km^{3} (960 cu mi) underground volume, of which 6–8% is filled with molten rock. This is about 2.5 times bigger than scientists had previously imagined; however, scientists believe that the proportion of molten rock in the chamber is too low to allow for another supereruption.

In October 2017, research from Arizona State University indicated prior to Yellowstone's last supereruption, magma surged into the magma chamber in two large influxes. An analysis of crystals from Yellowstone's lava showed that prior to the last supereruption, the magma chamber underwent a rapid increase in temperature and change in composition. The analysis indicated that Yellowstone's magma reservoir can reach eruptive capacity and trigger a super-eruption within just decades, not centuries as volcanologists had originally thought.

Since its most recent major eruption approximately 640,000 years ago (the Lava Creek event), Yellowstone has remained geologically active, primarily due to the vast magma chamber beneath the caldera. This chamber is estimated to contain around 4,000 km^{3} of partially molten material, making it one of the largest of its kind globally. Periodic uplift of the caldera floor—measured at rates of up to 75 mm per year—provides valuable insights into the dynamics of subterranean magma movement and is a key focus of ongoing geological monitoring efforts.

=== Hydrothermal explosions ===
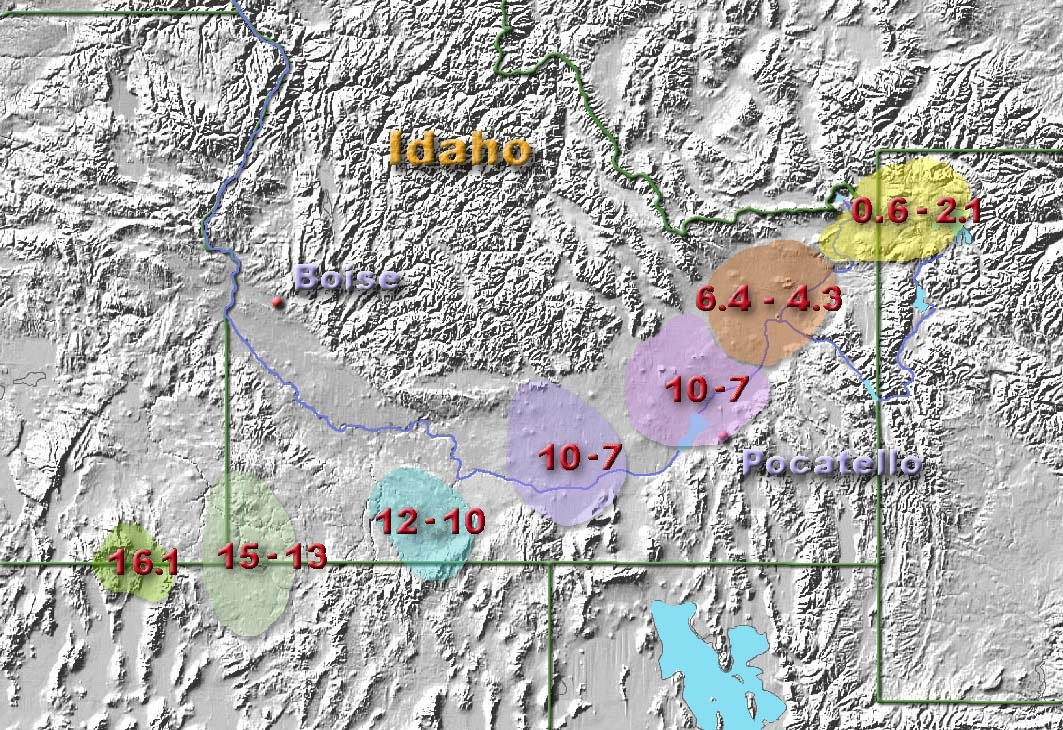
Path of the Yellowstone hotspot over the past 16 million years

Volcanic eruptions and ongoing geothermal activity at Yellowstone are attributed to a large plume of magma located beneath the caldera. This magma contains dissolved gases held under immense pressure. If the pressure is sufficiently reduced—due to geological shifts such as crustal fracturing—these gases can exsolve, forming bubbles and causing the magma to expand. This process can trigger a chain reaction, where further pressure release leads to increased gas expansion. In extreme cases, this may culminate in an explosive eruption if overlying crustal material is forcefully ejected.

Studies and analysis may indicate that the greater hazard comes from hydrothermal activity which occurs independently of volcanic activity. Over 20 large craters have been produced in the past 14,000 years, resulting in such features as Mary Bay, Turbid Lake, and Indian Pond, which was created in an eruption about 1300 BC.

In a 2003 report, USGS researchers proposed that an earthquake may have displaced more than 77 million cubic feet (2,200,000 m^{3}; 580,000,000 US gal) of water in Yellowstone Lake, creating colossal waves that unsealed a capped geothermal system and led to the hydrothermal explosion that formed Mary Bay.

Further research shows that very distant earthquakes reach and have effects upon the activities at Yellowstone, such as the 1992 7.3 magnitude Landers earthquake in California's Mojave Desert that triggered a swarm of quakes from more than 800 miles (1,300 km) away, and the 2002 7.9 magnitude Denali fault earthquake 2,000 miles (3,200 km) away in Alaska that altered the activity of many geysers and hot springs for several months afterward.

In 2016, the USGS announced plans to map the subterranean systems responsible for feeding the area's hydrothermal activity. According to the researchers, these maps could help predict when another eruption occurs.

== Cultural significance ==
=== IUGS geological heritage site ===
In respect of it being "well-known for its past explosive volcanic eruptions and lava flows as well for its world class hydrothermal system", the International Union of Geological Sciences (IUGS) included "The Yellowstone volcanic and hydrothermal system" in its assemblage of 100 geological heritage sites around the world in a listing published in October 2022. The organization defines an IUGS Geological Heritage Site as "a key place with geological elements and/or processes of international scientific relevance, used as a reference, and/or with a substantial contribution to the development of geological sciences through history".

== See also ==
- Iceland hotspot and Iceland plume
- Lake Taupō
- Lake Toba
- Long Valley Caldera, Valles Caldera, La Garita Caldera
- Toba catastrophe theory

== Sources ==
- Manley, C. R.; McIntosh, W. C. (2002). "The Juniper Mountain volcanic center, Owyhee County, southwestern Idaho: Age relations and physical volcanology". In Bonnichsen, Bill; White, C. M.; McCurry, Michael (eds.). Tectonic and Magmatic Evolution of the Snake River Plain Volcanic Province. Bulletin. Vol. 30. Idaho Geological Survey. pp. 205–227.
- Morgan, Lisa A.; Shanks, W. C. Pat III (2005). "Influences of Rhyolitic Lava Flows on Hydrothermal Processes in Yellowstone Lake and on the Yellowstone Plateau". Geothermal Biology and Geochemistry in YNP. Montana State University.
- Christiansen, Robert L.; Lowenstern, Jacob B.; Smith, Robert B.; Heasler, Henry; Morgan, Lisa A.; Nathenson, Manuel; Mastin, Larry G.; Muffler, L.J. Patrick; Robinson, Joel E. (2007). "Preliminary Assessment of Volcanic and Hydrothermal Hazards in Yellowstone National Park and Vicinity". Open-File Report: 61. Bibcode:2007usgs.rept...61C. doi:10.3133/ofr20071071. ISSN 2331-1258.
- Obradovich, J. D. (1992). "Geochronology of the Late Cenozoic volcanism of Yellowstone National Park and adjoining areas, Wyoming and Idaho". Open-File Report (Report). Open-File Report. U.S. Geological Survey. doi:10.3133/ofr92408.
- Pritchard, Chad J.; Larson, Peter B. (March 16, 2012). "Genesis of the post-caldera eastern Upper Basin Member rhyolites, Yellowstone, WY: from volcanic stratigraphy, geochemistry, and radiogenic isotope modeling". Contributions to Mineralogy and Petrology. 164 (2): 205–228. Bibcode:2012CoMP..164..205P. doi:10.1007/s00410-012-0733-9. ISSN 0010-7999.
- Till, Christy B.; Vazquez, Jorge A.; Stelten, Mark E.; Shamloo, Hannah I.; Shaffer, Jamie S. (2019). "Coexisting Discrete Bodies of Rhyolite and Punctuated Volcanism Characterize Yellowstone's Post-Lava Creek Tuff Caldera Evolution". Geochemistry, Geophysics, Geosystems. 20 (8): 3861–3881. Bibcode:2019GGG....20.3861T. doi:10.1029/2019gc008321. ISSN 1525-2027.
- Nastanski, Nicole Marie (2005). Petrogenesis of extracaldera rhyolites at Yellowstone volcanic field: Evidence for an evolving silicic magma system north of Yellowstone Caldera (Master's thesis). University of Nevada, Las Vegas. doi:10.25669/mkjk-5nhm.
- Perkins, Michael E.; Nash, Barbara P. (March 1, 2002). "Explosive silicic volcanism of the Yellowstone hotspot: The ash fall tuff record". GSA Bulletin. 114 (3): 367–381. Bibcode:2002GSAB..114..367P. doi:10.1130/0016-7606(2002)114<0367:ESVOTY>2.0.CO;2. ISSN 0016-7606.
- Westgate, J. A.; Christiansen, E. A.; Boellstorff, J. D. (1977). "Wascana Creek Ash (Middle Pleistocene) in southern Saskatchewan: characterization, source, fission track age, palaeomagnetism and stratigraphic significance". Canadian Journal of Earth Sciences. 14 (3): 357–374. Bibcode:1977CaJES..14..357W. doi:10.1139/e77-037. ISSN 0008-4077.
- Sarna-Wojcicki, Andrei M.; Davis, Jonathan O. (January 1, 1991), "Quaternary tephrochronology", in Morrison, Roger B. (ed.), Quaternary Nonglacial Geology: Conterminous U.S., vol. K-2, Geological Society of America, p. 0, doi:10.1130/dnag-gna-k2.93, ISBN 978-0-8137-5461-1
- Henderson, Stacy (November 20, 2023). "The Mystery of Flagg Ranch, OR, the case of the unknown ignimbrite". Yellowstone Volcano Observatory.
- Myers, Madison; Henderson, Stacy; Salazar, Raymond; Wilson, Colin J N; Finch, Hailey; Brown, Thomas (December 11, 2024). A chronostratigraphic reassessment of the Lava Creek Tuff, Yellowstone. American Geophysical Union Fall Meeting. San Francisco, California.
- U.S. Geological Survey, Volcano Science Center (2024). "Yellowstone Volcano Observatory 2023 annual report". Circular (Report). Circular. Reston, Virginia: U.S. Geological Survey. p. 49. doi:10.3133/cir1524.
- Matthews, Naomi E.; Vazquez, Jorge A.; Calvert, Andrew T. (2015). "Age of the Lava Creek supereruption and magma chamber assembly at Yellowstone based on 40Ar/39Ar and U-Pb dating of sanidine and zircon crystals". Geochemistry, Geophysics, Geosystems. 16 (8): 2508–2528. doi:10.1002/2015GC005881. ISSN 1525-2027.
- Stelten, Mark E.; Champion, Duane E.; Kuntz, Mel A. (January 15, 2018). "The timing and origin of pre- and post-caldera volcanism associated with the Mesa Falls Tuff, Yellowstone Plateau volcanic field". Journal of Volcanology and Geothermal Research. 350: 47–60. Bibcode:2018JVGR..350...47S. doi:10.1016/j.jvolgeores.2017.12.002. ISSN 0377-0273.
- Troch, Juliana; Ellis, Ben S.; Mark, Darren F.; Bindeman, Ilya N.; Kent, Adam J. R.; Guillong, Marcel; Bachmann, Olivier (January 23, 2017). "Rhyolite Generation prior to a Yellowstone Supereruption: Insights from the Island Park–Mount Jackson Rhyolite Series". Journal of Petrology egw071. doi:10.1093/petrology/egw071. hdl:20.500.11850/197283. ISSN 0022-3530.
- Anders, Mark H. (1994). "Constraints on North American plate velocity from the Yellowstone hotspot deformation field". Nature. 369 (6475): 53–55. Bibcode:1994Natur.369...53A. doi:10.1038/369053a0. ISSN 1476-4687.
- Balsley, Steven D.; Gregory, Robert T. (October 1, 1998). "Low-18O silicic magmas: why are they so rare?". Earth and Planetary Science Letters. 162 (1): 123–136. doi:10.1016/S0012-821X(98)00161-7. ISSN 0012-821X. OSTI 1370.
- Camp, Victor; Wells, Ray (2021). "The Case for a Long-Lived and Robust Yellowstone Hotspot". GSA Today. 31 (1): 4–10. Bibcode:2021GSAT...31a...4C. doi:10.1130/gsatg477a.1. ISSN 1052-5173.
- Christiansen, E. H.; McCurry, M. O.; Champion, D. E.; Bolte, T.; Holtz, F.; Knott, T.; Branney, M. J.; Shervais, J. W. (December 1, 2013). "Rhyolites in the Kimberly Drill Core, Project Hotspot: First Intracaldera Ignimbrite from the Central Snake River Plain, Idaho?". Fall Meeting 2013. 2013. American Geophysical Union: V53E–05. Bibcode:2013AGUFM.V53E..05C.
- Christiansen, Robert L. (2001). "The Quaternary and Pliocene Yellowstone Plateau volcanic field of Wyoming, Idaho, and Montana". USGS Report: 4. Bibcode:2001usgs.rept....4C. doi:10.3133/pp729G. ISSN 2330-7102.
- Christiansen, Robert L.; Foulger, G. R.; Evans, John R. (2002). "Upper-mantle origin of the Yellowstone hotspot". Geological Society of America Bulletin. 114 (10): 1245–1256. Bibcode:2002GSAB..114.1245C. doi:10.1130/0016-7606(2002)114<1245:UMOOTY>2.0.CO;2.
- Faccenna, Claudio; Becker, Thorsten W.; Lallemand, Serge; Lagabrielle, Yves; Funiciello, Francesca; Piromallo, Claudia (October 15, 2010). "Subduction-triggered magmatic pulses: A new class of plumes?". Earth and Planetary Science Letters. 299 (1): 54–68. Bibcode:2010E&PSL.299...54F. doi:10.1016/j.epsl.2010.08.012. ISSN 0012-821X.
- Henry, Christopher D.; Castor, Stephen B.; Starkel, William A.; Ellis, Ben S.; Wolff, John A.; Laravie, Joseph A.; McIntosh, William C.; Heizler, Matthew T. (July 17, 2017). "Geology and evolution of the McDermitt caldera, northern Nevada and southeastern Oregon, western USA". Geosphere. 13 (4): 1066–1112. Bibcode:2017Geosp..13.1066H. doi:10.1130/ges01454.1. hdl:20.500.11850/225749. ISSN 1553-040X.
- Izett, Glen A. (1981). "Volcanic ash beds: Recorders of Upper Cenozoic silicic pyroclastic volcanism in the western United States". Journal of Geophysical Research: Solid Earth. 86 (B11): 10200–10222. Bibcode:1981JGR....8610200I. doi:10.1029/JB086iB11p10200. ISSN 2156-2202.
- Izett, G. A.; Wilcox, R. E. (1982). "Map Showing Localities and Inferred Distributions of the Huckleberry Ridge, Mesa Falls, and Lava Creek Ash Beds of Pliocene and Pleistocene Age in the Western United States and Southern Canada". U.S. Geological Survey.
- Johnston, Stephen T.; Jane Wynne, P.; Francis, Don; Hart, Craig J. R.; Enkin, Randolph J.; Engebretson, David C. (November 1, 1996). "Yellowstone in Yukon: The Late Cretaceous Carmacks Group". Geology. 24 (11): 997–1000. Bibcode:1996Geo....24..997J. doi:10.1130/0091-7613(1996)024<0997:YIYTLC>2.3.CO;2. ISSN 0091-7613.
- King, Scott D. (March 1, 2007). "Hotspots and edge-driven convection". Geology. 35 (3): 223–226. Bibcode:2007Geo....35..223K. doi:10.1130/G23291A.1. ISSN 0091-7613.
- Long, Maureen D.; Till, Christy B.; Druken, Kelsey A.; Carlson, Richard W.; Wagner, Lara S.; Fouch, Matthew J.; James, David E.; Grove, Timothy L.; Schmerr, Nicholas; Kincaid, Chris (2012). "Mantle dynamics beneath the Pacific Northwest and the generation of voluminous back-arc volcanism". Geochemistry, Geophysics, Geosystems. 13 (8) 2012GC004189. Bibcode:2012GGG....13.AN01L. doi:10.1029/2012gc004189. hdl:1721.1/85588. ISSN 1525-2027.
- National Park Service. "Gibbon Falls". National Park Service.
- Neace, T. F. (1986). Eruptive style, emplacement, and lateral variations of the Mesa Falls Tuff, Island Park, Idaho, as shown by detailed volcanic stratigraphy and pyroclastic studies (M.S. thesis). Pocatello: Idaho State University.
- Nelson, Peter L.; Grand, Stephen P. (2018). "Lower-mantle plume beneath the Yellowstone hotspot revealed by core waves". Nature Geoscience. 11 (4): 280–284. Bibcode:2018NatGe..11..280N. doi:10.1038/s41561-018-0075-y. ISSN 1752-0908.
- Perkins, Michael E.; Nash, William P.; Brown, Francis H.; Fleck, Robert J. (December 1, 1995). "Fallout tuffs of Trapper Creek, Idaho—A record of Miocene explosive volcanism in the Snake River Plain volcanic province". GSA Bulletin. 107 (12): 1484–1506. Bibcode:1995GSAB..107.1484P. doi:10.1130/0016-7606(1995)107<1484:FTOTCI>2.3.CO;2. ISSN 0016-7606.
- Phillips, William M.; Garwood, Dean L.; Feeney, Dennis M. (2014). "Geologic Map of the Salmon Quadrangle, Lemhi County, Idaho". Idaho Geological Survey.
- Richards, Mark A.; Duncan, Robert A.; Courtillot, Vincent E. (October 6, 1989). "Flood Basalts and Hot-Spot Tracks: Plume Heads and Tails". Science. 246 (4926): 103–107. Bibcode:1989Sci...246..103R. doi:10.1126/science.246.4926.103. PMID 17837768.
- Rivera, Tiffany A.; Darata, Rachel; Lippert, Peter C.; Jicha, Brian R.; Schmitz, Mark D. (December 1, 2017). "The duration of a Yellowstone super-eruption cycle and implications for the age of the Olduvai subchron". Earth and Planetary Science Letters. 479: 377–386. Bibcode:2017E&PSL.479..377R. doi:10.1016/j.epsl.2017.08.027. ISSN 0012-821X.
- Rivera, Tiffany A.; Furlong, Ryan; Vincent, Jaime; Gardiner, Stephanie; Jicha, Brian R.; Schmitz, Mark D.; Lippert, Peter C. (2018). "Volcanism at 1.45 Ma within the Yellowstone Volcanic Field, United States". Journal of Volcanology and Geothermal Research. 357: 224–238. Bibcode:2018JVGR..357..224R. doi:10.1016/j.jvolgeores.2018.04.030. ISSN 0377-0273.
- Rivera, Tiffany A.; Schmitz, Mark D.; Jicha, Brian R.; Crowley, James L. (October 29, 2016). "Zircon Petrochronology and^{40}Ar/^{39}Ar Sanidine Dates for the Mesa Falls Tuff: Crystal-scale Records of Magmatic Evolution and the Short Lifespan of a Large Yellowstone Magma Chamber". Journal of Petrology egw053. doi:10.1093/petrology/egw053. ISSN 0022-3530.
- Sarna-Wojcicki, A. M.; Morrison, S. D.; Meyer, C. E.; Hillhouse, J. W. (February 1, 1987). "Correlation of upper Cenozoic tephra layers between sediments of the western United States and eastern Pacific Ocean and comparison with biostratigraphic and magnetostratigraphic age data". GSA Bulletin. 98 (2): 207–223. Bibcode:1987GSAB...98..207S. doi:10.1130/0016-7606(1987)98<207:COUCTL>2.0.CO;2. ISSN 0016-7606.
- Sarna-Wojcicki, Andrei M.; Knott, Jefferey R.; Westgate, John A.; Budahn, James R.; Barron, John; Bray, Colin J.; Ludvigson, Greg A.; Meyer, Charles E.; Miller, David M.; Otto, Rick E.; Pearce, Nicholas J.G.; Smith, Charles C.; Walkup, Laura C.; Wan, Elmira; Yount, James (July 20, 2023). "Ibex Hollow Tuff from ca. 12 Ma supereruption, southern Idaho, identified across North America, eastern Pacific Ocean, and Gulf of Mexico". Geosphere. 19 (5): 1476–1507. Bibcode:2023Geosp..19.1476S. doi:10.1130/GES02593.1. ISSN 1553-040X.
- Singer, Brad S.; Jicha, Brian R.; Condon, Daniel J.; Macho, Alexandra S.; Hoffman, Kenneth A.; Dierkhising, Joseph; Brown, Maxwell C.; Feinberg, Joshua M.; Kidane, Tesfaye (November 1, 2014). "Precise ages of the Réunion event and Huckleberry Ridge excursion: Episodic clustering of geomagnetic instabilities and the dynamics of flow within the outer core". Earth and Planetary Science Letters. 405: 25–38. Bibcode:2014E&PSL.405...25S. doi:10.1016/j.epsl.2014.08.011. ISSN 0012-821X.
- Swallow, Elliot J.; Wilson, Colin J. N.; Myers, Madison L.; Wallace, Paul J.; Collins, Katie S.; Smith, Euan G. C. (March 29, 2018). "Evacuation of multiple magma bodies and the onset of caldera collapse in a supereruption, captured in glass and mineral compositions". Contributions to Mineralogy and Petrology. 173 (4): 33. Bibcode:2018CoMP..173...33S. doi:10.1007/s00410-018-1459-0. ISSN 1432-0967.
- Swallow, Elliot J; Wilson, Colin J N; Charlier, Bruce L A; Gamble, John A (June 28, 2019). "The Huckleberry Ridge Tuff, Yellowstone: evacuation of multiple magmatic systems in a complex episodic eruption". Journal of Petrology. 60 (7): 1371–1426. doi:10.1093/petrology/egz034. hdl:10468/8257. ISSN 0022-3530.
- USGS (February 14, 2021). "The Other Volcanic Range in the Yellowstone Region: The Absarokas". USGS. United States Geological Survey.
- Watts, Kathryn E.; Bindeman, Ilya N.; Schmitt, Axel K. (May 1, 2011). "Large-volume Rhyolite Genesis in Caldera Complexes of the Snake River Plain: Insights from the Kilgore Tuff of the Heise Volcanic Field, Idaho, with Comparison to Yellowstone and Bruneau–Jarbidge Rhyolites". Journal of Petrology. 52 (5): 857–890. doi:10.1093/petrology/egr005. ISSN 0022-3530.
- Wilson, C. J. (December 1, 2009). "Physical Volcanology of the Huckleberry Ridge Tuff". American Geophysical Union. 2009: V23C–2085. Bibcode:2009AGUFM.V23C2085W.
- Wilson, Colin J. N. (February 1, 2017). "Volcanoes: Characteristics, Tipping Points, and those Pesky Unknown Unknowns". Elements. 13 (1): 41–46. Bibcode:2017Eleme..13...41W. doi:10.2113/gselements.13.1.41. ISSN 1811-5209.
- Wilson, Colin J. N.; Stelten, Mark E.; Lowenstern, Jacob B. (May 16, 2018). "Contrasting perspectives on the Lava Creek Tuff eruption, Yellowstone, from new U–Pb and 40Ar/39Ar age determinations". Bulletin of Volcanology. 80 (6): 53. doi:10.1007/s00445-018-1229-x. ISSN 1432-0819.
- Wotzlaw, Jörn-Frederik; Bindeman, Ilya N.; Stern, Richard A.; D'Abzac, Francois-Xavier; Schaltegger, Urs (September 10, 2015). "Rapid heterogeneous assembly of multiple magma reservoirs prior to Yellowstone supereruptions". Scientific Reports. 5 (1) 14026. Bibcode:2015NatSR...514026W. doi:10.1038/srep14026. hdl:20.500.11850/104434. ISSN 2045-2322. PMC 4564848. PMID 26356304.
- Yellowstone Volcano Observatory (2023). Yellowstone Volcano Observatory 2022 Annual Report (Report). Circular. U.S. Geological Survey.
- Zhou, Ying (2018). "Anomalous mantle transition zone beneath the Yellowstone hotspot track". Nature Geoscience. 11 (6): 449–453. Bibcode:2018NatGe..11..449Z. doi:10.1038/s41561-018-0126-4. ISSN 1752-0908.
- Bouligand, Claire; Tivey, Maurice A.; Finn, Carol A.; Morgan, Lisa A.; Shanks, W. C. Pat; Sohn, Robert A. (August 27, 2020). "Geological and Thermal Control of the Hydrothermal System in Northern Yellowstone Lake: Inferences From High‐Resolution Magnetic Surveys". Journal of Geophysical Research: Solid Earth. 125 (9). doi:10.1029/2020jb019743. ISSN 2169-9313.
- Myers, Madison L.; Salazar, Raymond D.; Wilson, Colin J.N.; Finch, Hailey; Henderson, Stacy L.; Stelten, Mark E.; Ketel, Jessica; Brown, Thomas; Ruth, Dawn (June 10, 2026). "Ignimbrites of the Sour Creek dome, Yellowstone volcano, USA: Implications for the Lava Creek Tuff eruption and Yellowstone Caldera". Geosphere. 22 (4): 637–657. doi:10.1130/GES02939.1. ISSN 1553-040X.
- Swallom, Meredith L.; Thigpen, J. Ryan; Dortch, Jason M.; Johnson, Sarah E.; Goldsby, Ryan C.; Woolery, Edward W.; Brown, Summer J.; Hoar, Rachel M.; Vicroy, Stephanie; McGlue, Michael M.; Yeager, Kevin M. (2026). "Modern Crustal Extension Across the Yellowstone Caldera Indicates Linkage of the Teton and East Gallatin Faults". Tectonics. 45 (3) e2024TC008752. doi:10.1029/2024TC008752. ISSN 1944-9194.
- Morgan, L.A; Shanks, W.C; Lovalvo, D.A; Johnson, S.Y; Stephenson, W.J; Pierce, K.L; Harlan, S.S; Finn, C.A; Lee, G; Webring, M; Schulze, B; Dühn, J; Sweeney, R; Balistrieri, L (2003). "Exploration and discovery in Yellowstone Lake: results from high-resolution sonar imaging, seismic reflection profiling, and submersible studies". Journal of Volcanology and Geothermal Research. 122 (3–4): 221–242. doi:10.1016/S0377-0273(02)00503-6.
- Morgan, Lisa A.; Shanks, W. C. Pat; Lowenstern, Jacob B.; Farrell, Jamie M.; Robinson, Joel E. (2017). Geologic Field-Trip Guide to the Volcanic and Hydrothermal Landscape of the Yellowstone Plateau (Report). U.S. Geological Survey Scientific Investigations Report. U.S. Geological Survey. doi:10.3133/sir20175022P.
- Vazquez, Jorge A.; Stelten, Mark E.; Bindeman, Ilya N.; Cooper, Kari (2017). A Field Trip Guide to the Petrology of Quaternary Volcanism on the Yellowstone Plateau (Report). U.S. Geological Survey Scientific Investigations Report. U.S. Geological Survey. pp. 1–68. doi:10.3133/sir20175022Q.
- Befus, Kenneth S.; Ruefer, Anna C.; Allison, Chelsea M.; Thompson, James O. (2023). "Quartz-hosted inclusions and embayments reveal storage, fluxing, and ascent of the Mesa Falls Tuff, Yellowstone". Earth and Planetary Science Letters. 601 117909. doi:10.1016/j.epsl.2022.117909.
- Messa, Cole; Sims, Kenneth W. W.; Stelten, Mark E.; Lawler, Brandi; Kuntz, Mel A. (2025). "New ^{40}Ar/^{39}Ar eruption ages reveal an important temporal relationship between mafic and silicic volcanism in the Yellowstone Plateau volcanic field". Geology. 53 (4): 317–322. doi:10.1130/G52709.1.
- Wheeler, Liv; Henderson, Stacy; Myers, Madison; Wilson, Colin; Arnold, Liam; Luft, Lexi; Nolander, Faith; Gormley, Lynne (October 22, 2025). Layer by Layer: Differentiating Yellowstone's Eruptions through Remapping, Petrology, and Geochronology. GSA Connects 2025. Geological Society of America. doi:10.1130/abs/2025AM-9470.
- Wheeler, Liv; Henderson, Stacy (July 7, 2025). "Eruption Unknown: The case of the newly recognized geologic unit". Caldera Chronicles. U.S. Geological Survey.
- Henderson, Stacy; Myers, Madison; Wilson, Colin J. N.; Schwartz, Darin (2023). From magma to tuff: using sanidine to interrogate the physical distribution plumbing systems and the Lava Creek Tuff, Yellowstone. IAVCEI Scientific Assembly 2023. Rotorua, New Zealand. p. 459.
- Shamloo, Hannah I.; Till, Christy B. (2019). "Decadal transition from quiescence to supereruption: petrologic investigation of the Lava Creek Tuff, Yellowstone Caldera, WY". Contributions to Mineralogy and Petrology. 174 (4) 32. doi:10.1007/s00410-019-1570-x.
