= Bruneau-Jarbidge volcanic field =

Miocene caldera in southwest Idaho

Coordinates: 42.3°N 115.2°W

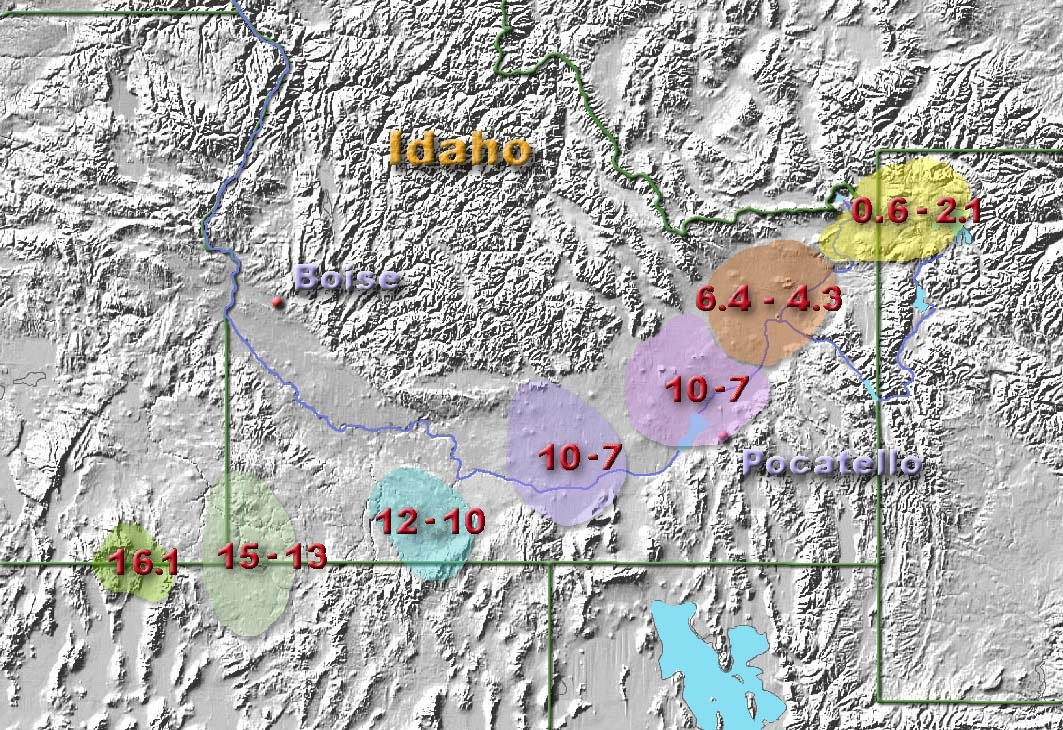
Locations of the Yellowstone hotspot during the past 15 million years. The Bruneau-Jarbidge center is denoted with "12-10" and the light blue area.

The Bruneau-Jarbidge volcanic field, also known as the Bruneau-Jarbidge eruptive center, is located in present-day southwest Idaho. The volcano erupted during the Miocene, between ten and twelve million years ago, spreading a thick blanket of ash in the Bruneau-Jarbidge event. Animals were suffocated and burned in pyroclastic flows within a hundred miles of the event, and died of slow suffocation and starvation much farther away, notably at Ashfall Fossil Beds, located 1,000 miles downwind in northeastern Nebraska, where up to two meters of ash was deposited. At the time, the field was above the Yellowstone hotspot.

By its uniquely characteristic chemical composition and the distinctive size and shape of its crystals and glass shards, the volcano stood out among dozens of prominent ashfall horizons laid down in the Cretaceous, Paleogene, and Neogene periods of central North America. The event responsible for this fall of volcanic ash was identified at Bruneau-Jarbidge, 1,600 kilometers west in Idaho. Prevailing westerlies deposited distal ashfall over a vast area of the Great Plains.

The evolving composition of the erupted material indicates that while it is derived in large part from molten material from the middle or upper crust, it also incorporated a young basaltic component.
