= Mesa Falls Tuff =

Volcanic formation in Idaho, United States

Mesa Falls eruption
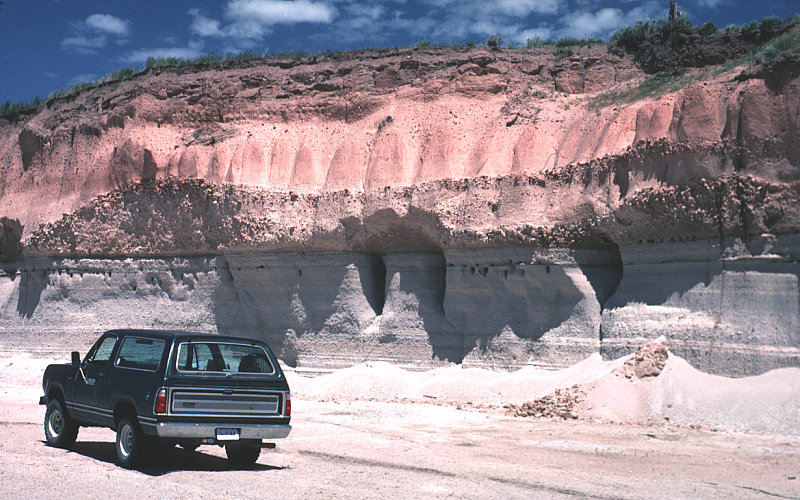
- Mesa Falls Tuff exposed at southern rim of both the Island Park Caldera and the Henry's Fork Caldera near Ashton, Idaho.
- Volcano: Henry's Fork Caldera
- Date: 1.3 million years ago
- Type: Ultra-Plinian
- Location: Idaho, United States; 44.33°N 111.33°W
- Volume: 280 km^{3} (67 cu mi)
- VEI: 7
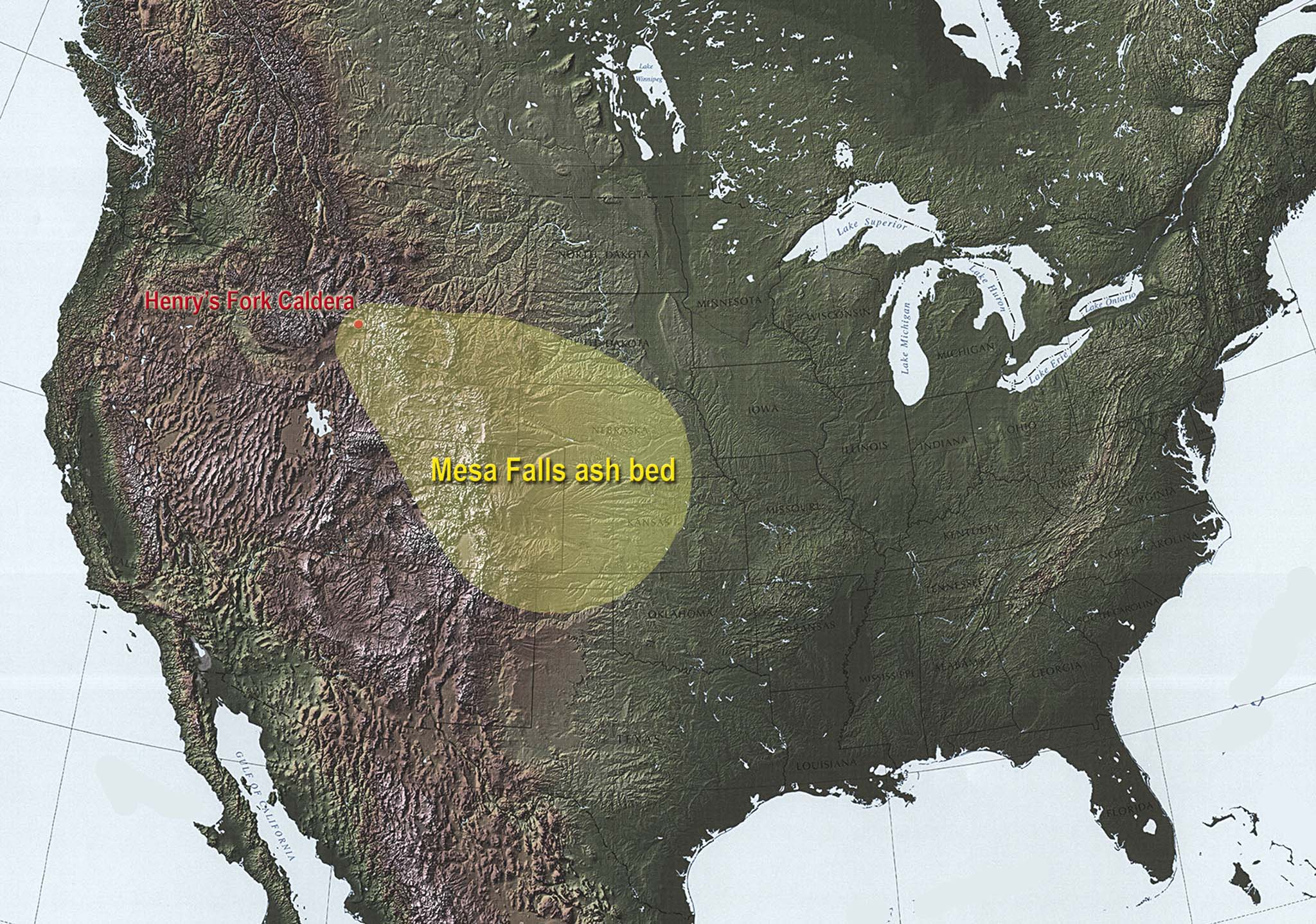
- Extent of the Mesa Falls ash bed

The Mesa Falls Tuff is a tuff formation produced by the Mesa Falls eruption that formed the Henry's Fork Caldera that is located in Idaho west of Yellowstone National Park. It is the second most recent caldera forming eruption from the Yellowstone hotspot and ejected of 280 km^{3} (67 cu mi) of material. This eruption, 1.3 million years BP, was preceded by the Huckleberry Ridge Tuff and succeeded by the Lava Creek Tuff, both of which were also formed by the Yellowstone hotspot.

== See also ==
- Yellowstone Caldera
- Snake River Plain
- Island Park, Idaho
- Upper Mesa Falls
- Lower Mesa Falls
