= Yellowstone hotspot =

Volcanic hotspot in the United States

- Schematic of the hotspot and the Yellowstone Caldera

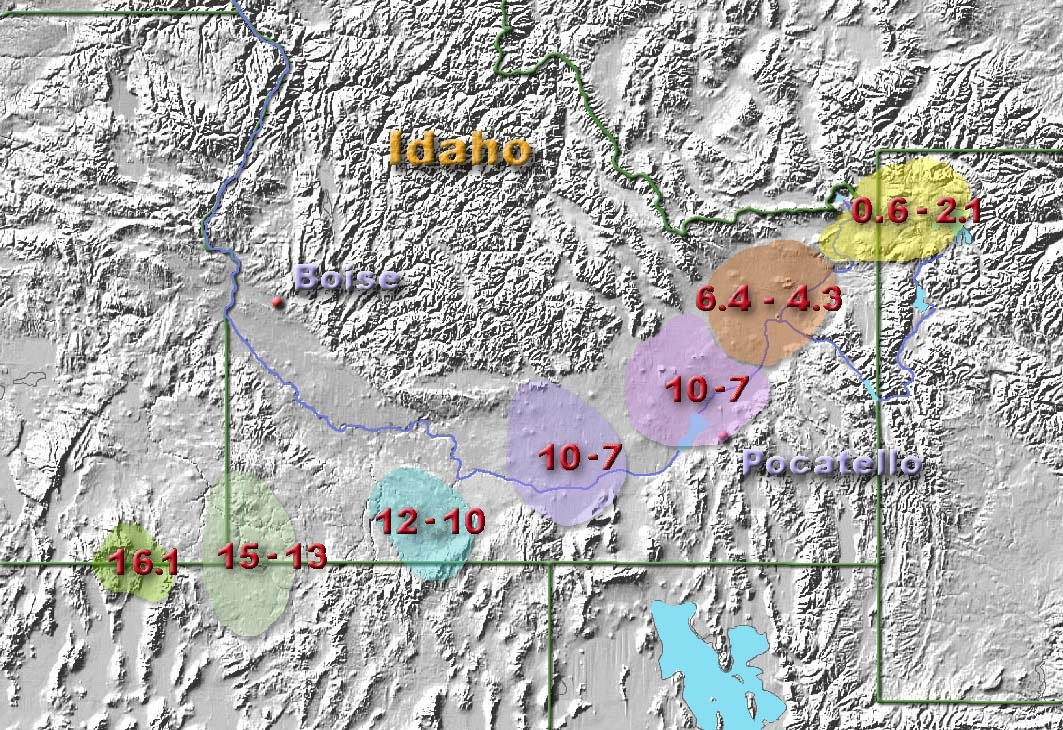
- Past locations of the hotspot in millions of years
- Country: United States
- State: Idaho/Montana/Wyoming
- Region: Rocky Mountains
- Coordinates: 44.43°N 110.67°W

The Yellowstone hotspot is a volcanic hotspot in the United States responsible for large scale volcanism in Idaho, Montana, Nevada, Oregon, and Wyoming, formed as the North American tectonic plate moved over it. It formed the eastern Snake River Plain through a succession of caldera-forming eruptions. The resulting calderas include the Island Park Caldera, Henry's Fork Caldera, and the Bruneau-Jarbidge caldera. The hotspot currently lies under the Yellowstone Caldera. The hotspot's most recent caldera-forming supereruption, known as the Lava Creek Eruption, took place 640,000 years ago and created the Lava Creek Tuff, and the most recent Yellowstone Caldera. The Yellowstone hotspot is one of a few volcanic hotspots underlying the North American tectonic plate; another example is the Anahim hotspot.

== Snake River Plain ==
The eastern Snake River Plain is a topographic depression that cuts across Basin and Range Mountain structures, more or less parallel to North American Plate motion. Beneath more recent basalts are rhyolite lavas and ignimbrites that erupted as the lithosphere passed over the hotspot. Younger volcanoes that erupted after passing over the hotspot covered the plain with young basalt lava flows in places, including Craters of the Moon National Monument and Preserve.

The central Snake River plain is similar to the eastern plain, but differs by having thick sections of interbedded lacustrine (lake) and fluvial (stream) sediments, including the Hagerman Fossil Beds.

== Nevada–Oregon calderas ==
Although the McDermitt volcanic field on the Nevada–Oregon border is frequently shown as the site of the initial impingement of the Yellowstone Hotspot, new geochronology and mapping demonstrates that the area affected by this mid-Miocene volcanism is significantly larger than previously appreciated. Three silicic calderas have been newly identified in northwest Nevada, west of the McDermitt volcanic field as well as the Virgin Valley Caldera. These calderas, along with the Virgin Valley Caldera and McDermitt Caldera, are interpreted to have formed during a short interval 16.5–15.5 million years ago, in the waning stage of the Steens flood basalt volcanism. The northwest Nevada calderas have diameters ranging from 15 to 26 km and deposited high temperature rhyolite ignimbrites over approximately 5000 km^{2}.

As the hotspot drifted beneath what is now Nevada and Oregon, it increased ecological beta diversity locally by fragmenting previously connected habitats and increasing topographic diversity in western North America.

The Bruneau-Jarbidge volcanic field erupted between ten and twelve million years ago, spreading a thick blanket of ash in the Bruneau-Jarbidge event and forming a wide caldera. Animals were suffocated and burned in pyroclastic flows within a hundred miles of the event, and died of slow suffocation and starvation much farther away, notably at Ashfall Fossil Beds, located 1000 miles downwind in northeastern Nebraska, where a foot of ash was deposited. There, two hundred fossilized rhinoceros and many other animals were preserved in two meters of volcanic ash. By its characteristic chemical fingerprint and the distinctive size and shape of its crystals and glass shards, the volcano stands out among dozens of prominent ashfall horizons laid down in the Cretaceous, Paleogene, and Neogene periods of central North America. The event responsible for this fall of volcanic ash was identified as Bruneau-Jarbidge. Prevailing westerlies deposited distal ashfall over a vast area of the Great Plains.

== Volcanic fields ==
=== Twin Falls and Picabo volcanic fields ===
The Twin Falls and Picabo volcanic fields were active about 10 million years ago. The Picabo Caldera was notable for producing the Arbon Valley Tuff 10.2 million years ago.

=== Heise volcanic field ===
The Heise volcanic field of eastern Idaho produced explosive caldera-forming eruptions which began 6.6 million years ago and lasted for more than 2 million years, sequentially producing four large-volume rhyolitic eruptions. The first three caldera-forming rhyolites – Blacktail Tuff, Walcott Tuff and Conant Creek Tuff – totaled at least 2250 km^{3} of erupted magma. The final, extremely voluminous, caldera-forming eruption – the Kilgore Tuff – which erupted 1800 km^{3} of ash, occurred 4.5 million years ago.

== Yellowstone Plateau ==
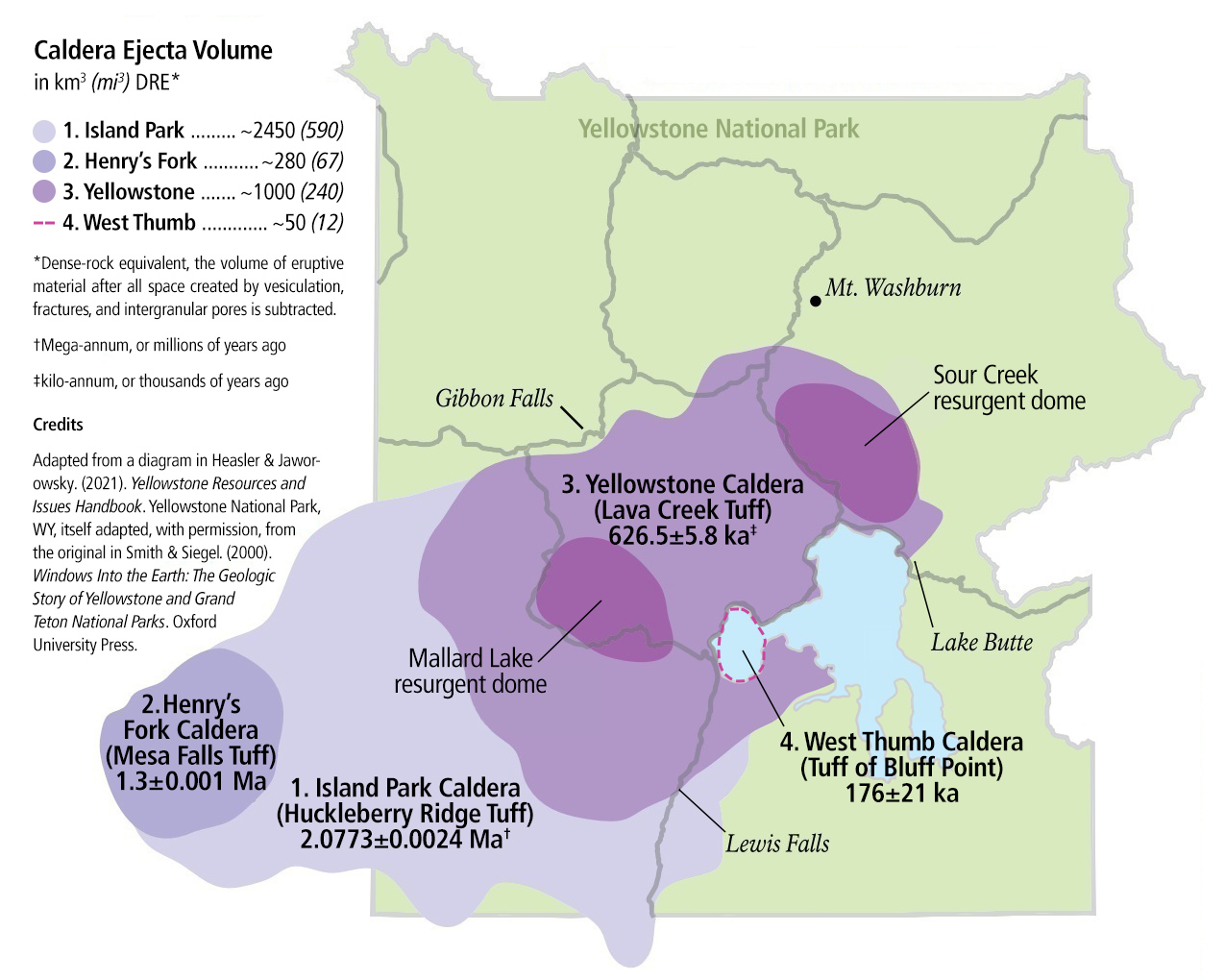
Yellowstone sits on top of four overlapping calderas.

The Yellowstone Plateau volcanic field is composed of four adjacent calderas. West Thumb Lake is itself formed by a smaller caldera (Note: West Thumb Lake is not to be confused with West Thumb Geyser Basin. The caldera created West Thumb Lake and the underlying Yellowstone hotspot keeps West Thumb Geyser Basin active. See Fig. 22.) which erupted 174,000 years ago. (See Yellowstone Caldera map.) The Henry's Fork Caldera in Idaho was formed in an eruption of more than 280 km^{3} (67 cu mi) 1.3 million years ago, and is the source of the Mesa Falls Tuff. The Henry's Fork Caldera is nested inside of the Island Park Caldera and the calderas share a rim on the western side. The earlier Island Park Caldera is much larger and more oval and extends well into Yellowstone Park. Although much smaller than the Island Park Caldera, the Henry's Fork Caldera is still sizeable at 18 miles (29 km) long and 23 miles (37 km) wide and its curved rim is plainly visible from many locations in the Island Park area.

Of the many calderas formed by the Yellowstone Hotspot, including the later Yellowstone Caldera, the Henry's Fork Caldera is the only one that is currently clearly visible. The Henry's Fork of the Snake River flows through the Henry's Fork Caldera and drops out at Upper and Lower Mesa Falls. The caldera is bounded by the Ashton Hill on the south, Big Bend Ridge and Bishop Mountain on the west, by Thurburn Ridge on the North and by Black Mountain and the Madison Plateau on the east. The Henry's Fork caldera is in an area called Island Park. Harriman State Park is situated in the caldera.

The Island Park Caldera is older and much larger than the Henry's Fork Caldera with approximate dimensions of 58 miles (93 km) by 40 miles (64 km). It is the source of the Huckleberry Ridge Tuff that is found from southern California to the Mississippi River near St. Louis. This supereruption occurred 2.1 million years BP and produced 2500 km^{3} (700 mi^{3}) of ash. The Island Park Caldera is sometimes referred to as the First Phase Yellowstone Caldera or the Huckleberry Ridge Caldera. The youngest of the hotspot calderas, the Yellowstone Caldera, formed 640,000 years ago and is about 34 miles (55 km) by 45 miles (72 km) wide. Non-explosive eruptions of lava and less-violent explosive eruptions have occurred in and near the Yellowstone Caldera since the last super eruption. The most recent lava flow occurred about 70,000 years ago, while the largest violent eruption excavated the West Thumb of Lake Yellowstone around 150,000 years ago. Smaller steam explosions occur as well – an explosion 13,800 years ago left a 5 kilometer diameter crater at Mary Bay on the edge of Yellowstone Lake.

Both the Heise and Yellowstone volcanic fields produced a series of caldera-forming eruptions characterised by magmas with so-called "normal" oxygen isotope signatures (with heavy oxygen-18 isotopes) and a series of predominantly post-caldera magmas with so-called "light" oxygen isotope signatures (characterised as low in heavy oxygen-18 isotopes). The final stage of volcanism at Heise was marked by "light" magma eruptions. If Heise is any indication, this could mean that the Yellowstone Caldera has entered its final stage, but the volcano might still exit with a climactic fourth caldera event analogous to the fourth and final caldera-forming eruption of Heise (the Kilgore Tuff) – which was also made up of so-called "light" magmas. The appearance of "light" magmas would seem to indicate that the uppermost portion of the continental crust has largely been consumed by the earlier caldera- forming events, exhausting the melting potential of the crust above the mantle plume. In this case Yellowstone could be expiring. It could be another 1–2 million years (as the North American Plate moves across the Yellowstone hotspot) before a new supervolcano is born to the northeast, and the Yellowstone Plateau volcanic field joins the ranks of its deceased ancestors in the Snake River Plain. A 2020 study suggests that the hotspot may be waning.

== Eruptive history ==
Number of earthquakes in Yellowstone National Park region (1973–2014)

Map of recent Yellowstone eruption fields, in comparison with a recent Long Valley Caldera eruption and Mount St. Helens.

- Wapi Lava field and King's Bowl blowout, northeast of Rupert, Idaho; 2.270 ka ±0.15. (2,270 years ago)
- Hell's Half Acre lava field, west to southwest of Idaho Falls; 3.250 ka ±0.15. (3,250 years ago)
- Shoshone lava field, North of Twin Falls, Idaho; 8.400 ka ±0.3.
- Craters of the Moon National Monument and Preserve; Great Rift of Idaho; the lava field was formed during eight eruptive episodes between about 15 and 2 ka.
  - Kings Bowl and Wapi lava fields formed about 2.250 ka.
- Yellowstone Caldera; between 70 and 150 ka; 1,000 cubic kilometers (239.9 cu mi) intracaldera rhyolitic lava flows.
  - Yellowstone Park
- Yellowstone Caldera (size: 45 x 85 km); 640 ka; VEI 8; more than 1,000 cubic kilometers (240 cu mi) of Lava Creek Tuff.
- Henry's Fork Caldera (size: 16 km wide); 1.3 Ma; VEI 7; 280 cubic kilometers (67.2 cu mi) of Mesa Falls Tuff.
  - Island Park Caldera
  - Harriman State Park
- Island Park Caldera (size: 100 x 50 km); 2.1 Ma; VEI 8; 2,450 cubic kilometers (588 cu mi) of Huckleberry Ridge Tuff.
- Heise volcanic field, Idaho:
  - Kilgore Caldera (size: 80 x 60 km); VEI 8; 1,800 cubic kilometers (432 cu mi) of Kilgore Tuff; 4.45 Ma ±0.05.
  - 4.49 Ma tuff of Heise
  - 5.37 Ma tuff of Elkhorn Springs
  - 5.51 Ma ±0.13 (Conant Creek Tuff) (but Anders (2009): 5.94 Ma)
  - 5.6 Ma; 500 cubic kilometers (120 cu mi) of Blue Creek Tuff.
  - 5.81 Ma tuff of Wolverine Creek
  - 6.27 Ma ±0.04 (Walcott Tuff).
  - 6.57 Ma tuff of Edie School
  - Blacktail Caldera (size: 100 x 60 km); 6.62 Ma ±0.03; 1,500 cubic kilometers (360 cu mi) of Blacktail Tuff.
- 7.48 Ma tuff of America Falls
- 8.72 Ma Grey's landing Ignimbrite; VEI 8. At least 2,800 cubic kilometers (672 cu mi) of volcanic material.
- 8.75 Ma tuff of Lost River Sinks
- 8.99 Ma, McMullen Supereruption; VEI 8. At least 1,700 cubic kilometers (408 cu mi) of volcanic material.
- 9.17 Ma tuff of Kyle Canyon
- 9.34 Ma tuff of Little Chokecherry Canyon
- Twin Falls volcanic field, Twin Falls County, Idaho; 8.6 to 10 Ma.
- Picabo volcanic field, Picabo, Idaho; 10.09 Ma (Arbon Valley Tuff A) and 10.21 Ma ±0.03 (Arbon Valley Tuff B).
- Bruneau-Jarbidge volcanic field, Bruneau River/ Jarbidge River, Idaho; 10.0 to 12.5 Ma; Ashfall Fossil Beds eruption.
- Owyhee-Humboldt volcanic field, Owyhee County, Idaho, Nevada, and Oregon; around 12.8 to 13.9 Ma.
- McDermitt volcanic field, Orevada rift, McDermitt, Nevada/ Oregon (five overlapping and nested calderas; satellitic to these are two additional calderas), 20,000 km^{2} (7,700 sq mi):
  - Trout Creek Mountains, East of the Pueblo Mountains, Whitehorse Caldera (size: 15 km wide), Oregon; 15 Ma; 40 cubic kilometers (10 cu mi) of Whitehorse Creek Tuff.
  - Jordan Meadow Caldera, (size: 10–15 km wide); 15.6 Ma; 350 cubic kilometers (84 cu mi) Longridge Tuff member 2–3.
  - Longridge Caldera, (size: 33 km wide); 15.6 Ma; 400 cubic kilometers (96 cu mi) Longridge Tuff member 5.
  - Calavera Caldera, (size: 17 km wide); 15.7 Ma; 300 cubic kilometers (72 cu mi) of Double H Tuff.
  - Trout Creek Mountains, Pueblo Caldera (size: 20 x 10 km), Oregon; 15.8 Ma; 40 cubic kilometers (10 cu mi) of Trout Creek Mountains Tuff.
  - Hoppin Peaks Caldera, 16 Ma; Hoppin Peaks Tuff.
  - Washburn Caldera, (size: 30 x 25 km wide), Oregon; 16.548 Ma; 250 cubic kilometers (60 cu mi) of Oregon Canyon Tuff.
- Yellowstone hotspot (?), Lake Owyhee volcanic field; 15.0 to 15.5 Ma.
- Yellowstone hotspot (?), Northwest Nevada volcanic field, Virgin Valley, High Rock, Hog Ranch, and unnamed calderas; West of the Pine Forest Range, Nevada; 15.5 to 16.5 Ma; Tuffs: Idaho Canyon, Ashdown, Summit Lake, and Soldier Meadow.
- Columbia River Basalt Province: Yellowstone hotspot sets off a huge pulse of volcanic activity, the first eruptions were near the Oregon-Idaho-Washington border. Columbia River and Steens flood basalts, Pueblo, and Malheur Gorge-region, Pueblo Mountains, Steens Mountain, Washington, Oregon, and Idaho; most vigorous eruptions were from 14 to 17 Ma; 180,000 cubic kilometers (43,184 cu mi) of lava.
  - Columbia River flood basalts, 175,000 cubic kilometers (41,985 cu mi)
  - Steens flood basalts, 65,000 cubic kilometers (15,594 cu mi)

=== Notes ===
- Harney Basin (Devine Canyon Tuff), McDermitt volcanic field, Owyhee-Humboldt volcanic field, Lake Owyhee volcanic field (or Jordan Valley volcanic field, Lake Owyhee), Jordan Craters, Santa Rosa – Calico volcanic field, Hawkes Valley – Lone Mountain volcanic field, Northwest Nevada volcanic field, Juniper Mountain caldera complex, and Silver City – Delamar caldera complex (Silver City, Idaho) are nested in one area. Geologic landmarks of the area: Steens Mountain, Northern Nevada Rift, Midas Trough, Santa Rosa Mountains, Bull Run – Tuscarora Mountains, Owyhee Mountains, Oregon-Idaho Graben, and western Snake River Plain.
- Other manifestations of the Yellowstone hotspot: Rexburg Volcanic Field (4.3 Ma), West of Rexburg, Idaho; Henry's Lake Volcanism (1.3 Ma), Henry's Lake; Blackfoot Volcanic Field (3 Ma), Northwest of Soda Springs, Idaho; Gem Valley Volcanic Field (600 to 50 ka), near Grace, Idaho.
- The initial volcanism is part of the Basin and Range Province and the Oregon-Idaho graben (15.0 to 15.5 Ma).

== See also ==
- Timeline of volcanism on Earth

== Map references ==
- Mark H. Anders. "Yellowstone hotspot track". Columbia University, Lamont–Doherty Earth Observatory (LDEO).
- "Map of Nevada" (PDF). Nevada Bureau of Mines and Geology, University of Nevada (NBMG). Archived from the original (PDF) on 2004-10-21.
- "Shaded relief map of the northwestern United States" (PDF). Nevada Bureau of Mines and Geology, University of Nevada (NBMG). Archived from the original (PDF) on 2011-07-25.
