= Yellowstone Plateau Volcanic Field =

Volcanic field in Southern United States with three major calderas

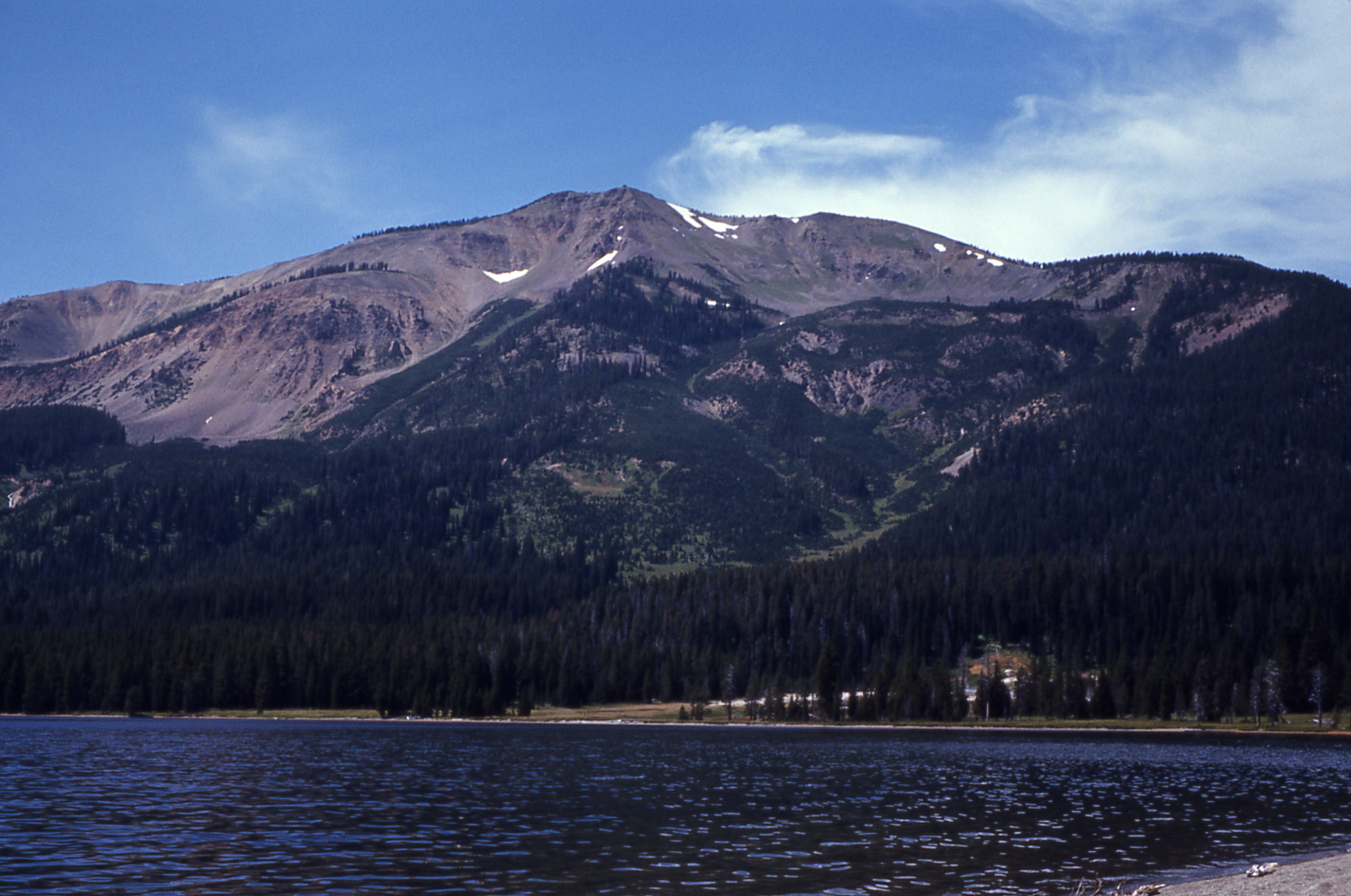
- Mount Sheridan, the highest peak in the Yellowstone Plateau Volcanic Field, from Heart Lake

Highest point
- Elevation: 11,372 ft (3,466 m)
- Coordinates: 44°28′16″N 110°30′07″W

Geography
- Location: United States; Park County, Wyoming; Teton County, Wyoming; Gallatin County, Montana; Park County, Montana; Fremont County, Idaho; Yellowstone National Park
- Parent range: Rocky Mountains
- Topo map: USGS Yellowstone National Park

Geology
- Rock age: ~2,080,000–70,000 years
- Mountain type(s): Complex volcano, volcanic plateau and volcanic field
- Last eruption: approximately 631,000 years ago (caldera-forming); 70,000 years ago (in the caldera)

Climbing
- Easiest route: Hike/auto/bus

The Yellowstone Plateau Volcanic Field, also known as the Yellowstone Supervolcano or the Yellowstone Volcano, is a complex volcano, volcanic plateau and volcanic field located mostly in the western U.S. state of Wyoming, but it also stretches into Idaho and Montana. It is a popular site for tourists.

Map of Yellowstone Volcano ash beds

The Yellowstone Plateau Volcanic Field began forming around 2 Ma (million years ago). It has had over 110 different eruptions and has created mostly rhyolitic plains, with over 6000 km^{3} of rhyolitic material formed. Scientists have discovered three major eruptions that formed calderas. They used methods of geological mapping, with both satellites and field work, and potassium-argon dating, to discover the eruptions. The three major eruptions are:

- The first large eruption was about 2.08 Ma and created the Huckleberry Ridge Caldera. This eruption produced more than 2,500 km2 of magma through at least three volcanic vents that produced large ash sheets across the area. This caldera had three main pulses of activity during its formation.
- The second large eruption was about 1.3 Ma and created the Henrys Fork Caldera. This eruption produced more than 280 km2 of magma and was nested within a portion of a larger caldera, the Huckleberry Ridge Caldera.
- The third large eruption was about 0.6 Ma and created the Yellowstone Caldera. This eruption produced 1,000 km2 of magma through at least two volcanic vents. The Yellowstone Caldera is above a continental hot spot, the Yellowstone mantle plume. After the caldera was formed, there were rhyolitic lava flows between 160,000 and 70,000 years ago.

The Yellowstone Caldera is a resurgent caldera and has experienced resurgent doming. The Yellowstone Caldera has two resurgent domes formed by magma upwelling called Sour Creek and Mallard Lakes. The magma chambers under the Yellowstone Caldera provides heat and energy for large hydrothermal systems. The Yellowstone Caldera has the greatest concentration of hydrothermal features in the world, and is an active system. The magma, geothermal activity, and hydrothermal system can lead to caldera motion, ash clouds, and earthquakes, so the Yellowstone Caldera is labeled as a geohazard. A large amount of the Yellowstone Plateau volcanic field is in the Yellowstone National Park.

== See also ==
- List of volcanic fields
