= Henry's Fork Caldera =

Caldera west of Yellowstone National Park

Coordinates: 44.33°N 111.33°W

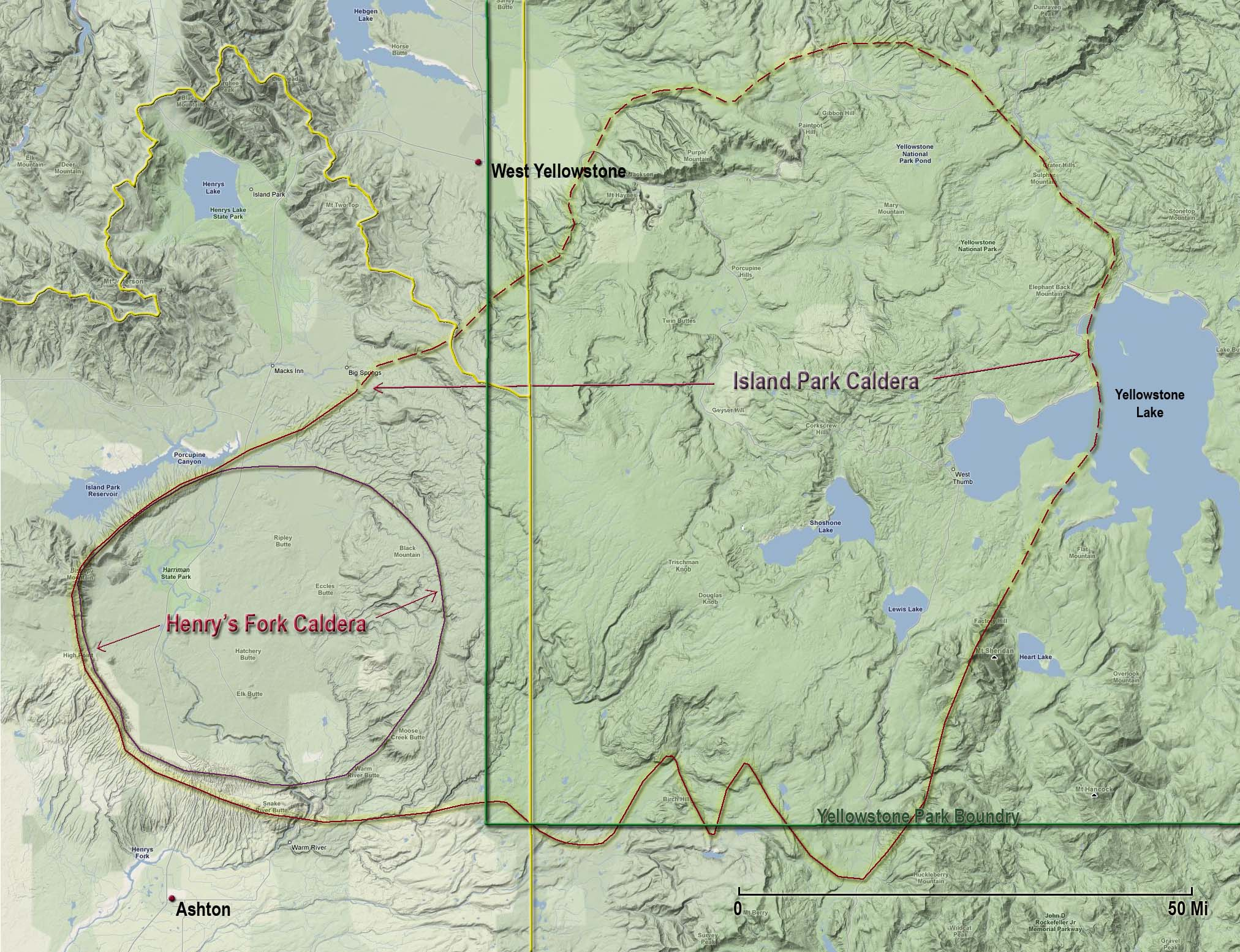
- Diagram of Henry's Fork and Island Park Caldera

Highest point
- Elevation: 2,805 m (9,203 ft)

Geography
- Location: Fremont County, Idaho, United States

Geology
- Mountain type: Caldera
- Volcanic field: Yellowstone Plateau Volcanic Field
- Last eruption: 1.3 myr

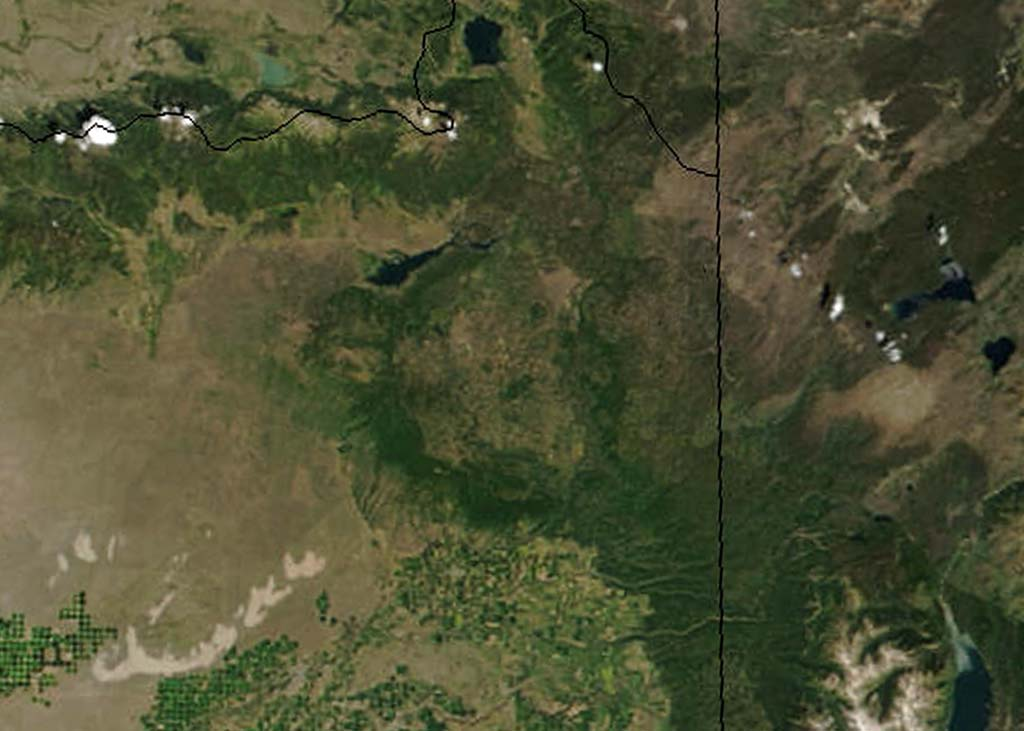
Henry's Fork Caldera is the circular structure in the center of this image, with left part of Island Park Caldera

The Henry's Fork Caldera in eastern Idaho is a caldera located in an area known as Island Park, west of Yellowstone National Park. The caldera was formed by an eruption 1.3 million years ago of the Yellowstone hotspot. The eruption distributed at least 280 cubic kilometers of ash known as the Mesa Falls Tuff, covering a region including all of Wyoming and most of Colorado, Nebraska, and Kansas.

The Henry's Fork Caldera is nested inside of the Island Park Caldera, and the calderas share a rim on the western side. The earlier Island Park Caldera is much larger and more oval and extends well into Yellowstone Park. Although much smaller than the Island Park Caldera, the Henry's Fork Caldera is still sizeable at 18 miles (29 km) long and 23 miles (37 km) wide and its curved rim is plainly visible from many locations in the Island Park area. Of the many calderas formed by the Yellowstone hotspot, including the later Yellowstone Caldera, the Henry's Fork Caldera is the only one that is currently clearly visible. It is one of a succession of volcanoes and calderas that formed the Snake River Plain.

The Henrys Fork of the Snake River flows through the Henry's Fork Caldera and drops out at Upper and Lower Mesa Falls. The caldera is bounded by the Ashton Hill on the south, Big Bend Ridge and Bishop Mountain on the west, by Thurmon Ridge on the North and by Black Mountain and the Madison Plateau on the east.

The Henry's Fork caldera is in an area called Island Park, known for its beautiful forests, large springs, clear streams, waterfalls, lakes, ponds, marshes, wildlife, and fishing. Harriman State Park is situated within the caldera. The peaks of the Teton Range in adjacent Wyoming are visible to the southeast. Snowmobiling, fishing, and Nordic skiing, and wildlife viewing are popular activities in the area.
