= Purple Mountain (Wyoming) =

Mountain in Montana, United States

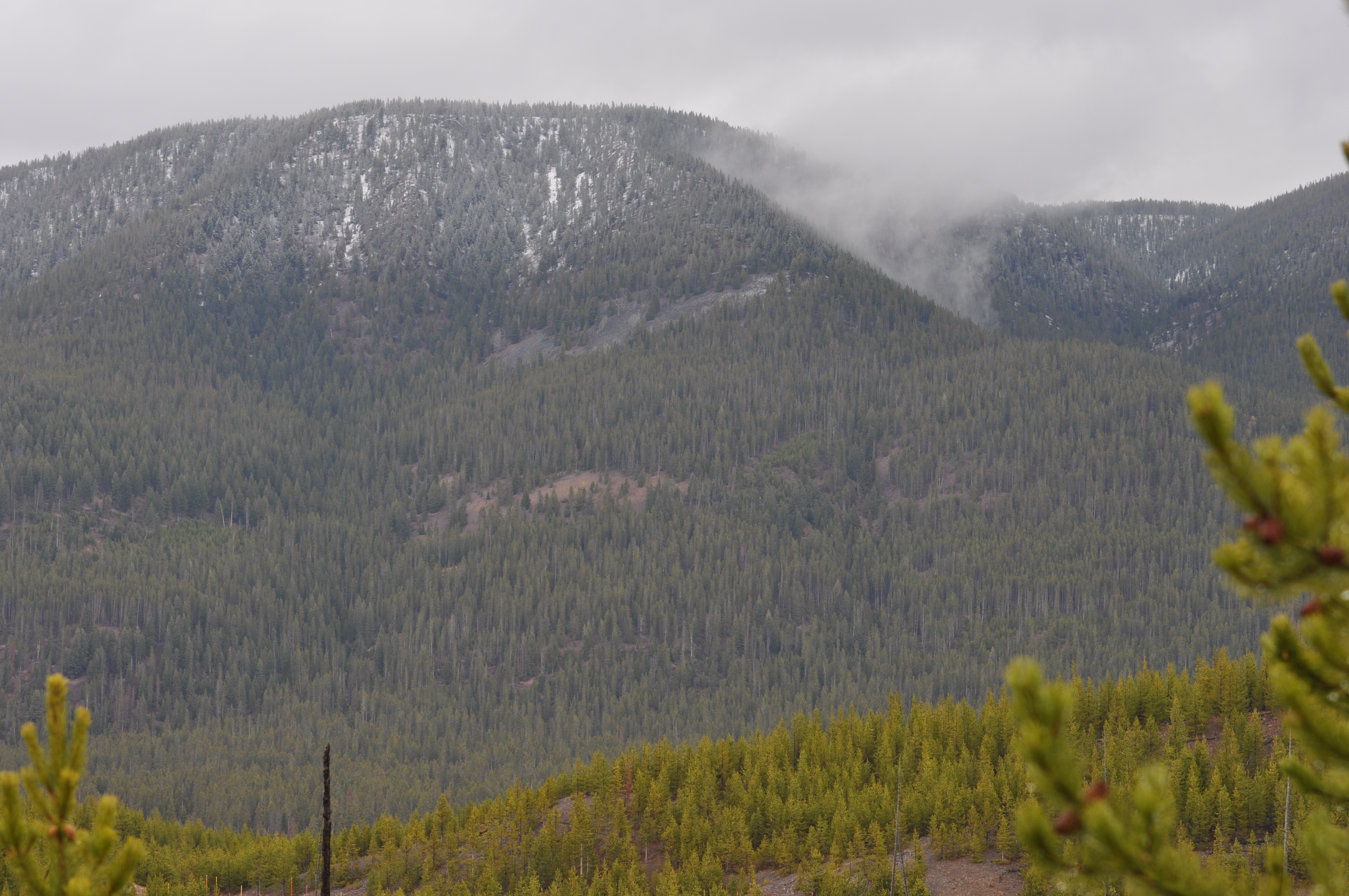
- Purple Mountain, October 2010

Highest point
- Elevation: 8,392 ft (2,558 m)
- Coordinates: 44°40′02″N 110°51′44″W

Geography
- Location within Wyoming
- Location: Yellowstone National Park, Park County, Montana
- Parent range: Gallatin Range

Purple Mountain, elevation 8,392 feet (2,558 m), is a mountain peak in the southern section of the Gallatin Range in Yellowstone National Park, in the U.S. state of Wyoming. The Purple Mountain Trail ascends to the summit from Madison Junction. It is located near the Lava Creek Tuff.

== See also ==
- Mountains and mountain ranges of Yellowstone National Park
