= List of large volcanic eruptions =

Satellite images of the 15 January 2022 eruption of Hunga Tonga-Hunga Haʻapai

This is a sortable list of large eruptions that occurred between 11.7 Ka and 450+ Ma. Uncertainties as to dates and tephra volumes are not restated, and references are not repeated. The inclusion criteria here only covers entries with a Volcanic explosivity index (VEI) of 5 or greater. The given values for events in the Miocene epoch sometimes lack references, and are given as VEI-equivalent, as an estimate of the erupted tephra volume.

== 11.7 to 49KA ==
VEI	Volcano/complex	Volcanic arc/belt, subregion, or hotspot	Material volume (km^{3})	Age in Ka	Tephra or eruption name
6	Lolobau Island	Bismarck Volcanic Arc	50	12	caldera formation
6	Menengai	Great Rift Valley, Kenya	< 25	12.3	Ruplax Tuff
6	Nevado de Toluca	Trans-Mexican Volcanic Belt	20	12.5	Upper Toluca Pumice
6	Sakurajima	Kyūshū	11	12.8	Sakurajima-Satsuma Tuff
6	Laacher See	Eifel hotspot	20	12.9	
6	Nigorigawa	Hokkaidō	10.9	14.6	
6	Phlegraean Fields	Campanian volcanic arc	79	14.9	Neapolitan Yellow Tuff
6	Maly Semyachik	Kamchatka	17.5	15	
6	Towada	Honshū	56	15.6	eruption episode L
7	Phlegraean Fields	Campanian volcanic arc	200 - 300	15.7	
5	Mount Vesuvius	Campanian volcanic arc	1.3	19.3	Green Pumice
7	Long Island, PNG	Bismarck Volcanic Arc	100	19.3	Kiau Ignimbrite
7	Zavaritzki Caldera	Simushir, Kuril Islands	200	20	
6	Mount Batur	Sunda Arc, Bali	19	20.2	Gunungkawi Ignimbrite
6	Rabaul	Bismarck Volcanic Arc	>10	21	Kulau Ignimbrite
6	Menengai	Great Rift Valley, Kenya	26.1	21	Caldera formation 2
6	Cape Riva Caldera, Santorini	South Aegean Volcanic Arc	>20	21.8	Cape Riva
5	Mount Vesuvius	Campanian volcanic arc	1.9	22	Basal Pumice
6	Mount Katmai	SW Alaska, Aleutian Arc	⩾10	22.8	Late Pleistocene rhyodacite pumice fall and ignimbrite
8	Taupō Volcano	Taupō Volcanic Zone	1170	26.5	Oruanui eruption (Note: First documented Supervolcanic eruption, and last known volcanic eruption with a VEI of 8.)
6	Morne Diablotins	Dominica, Lesser Antilles island arc	14	26.6	Grand Savanne Ignimbrite
7?	Laguna Caldera	Luzon Volcanic Arc	Unknown	27-29	
5	Mount Vesuvius	Campanian volcanic arc	2.2	28.6	Codola Pumice
6	Phlegraean Fields	Campanian volcanic arc	≥10	29.1	Y3
6	Emmons Lake caldera	SW Alaska, Aleutian Arc	50	29.3	Dawson Tephra
6	Mount Batur	Sunda Arc, Bali	84	29.3	Ubud Ignimbrite
6	Nemrut	Turkey	65.4	29.7	
6	Krasheninnikov	Kamchatka	13	30	Caldera formation
7-8	Aira Caldera	Kyūshū	940 - 1,040	30	Ito Ignimbrite
6	Nemo Peak	Onekotan, Kuril Islands	10	30.8	Nemo III
6	Shiveluch	Kamchatka	>30	32.2	caldera formation
6	Volcán Los Azufres	Trans-Mexican Volcanic Belt	11	32.8	Cieneguillas Ignimbrite
6	Morne Trois Pitons	Dominica, Lesser Antilles island arc	58	33.3	Roseau Tuff/Ignimbrite
7	Lake Ranau	Sunda Arc, Sumatra	150	33.6	Ranau Tuff
6	Nemo Peak	Onekotan, Kuril Islands	31.3	34	Nemo II
6	Ksudach	Kamchatka	25	35	Caldera II
6	Lake Mashū	Hokkaidō	10	35.3	Nu-p
6	Menengai	Great Rift Valley, Kenya	26.1	35.6	Menengai Tuff
6	Towada	Honshū	46	36	eruption episode N
6	Lake Mashū	Hokkaidō	10	38.3	Nu-r
7	Gorely	Kamchatka	120	39	Southern sea cliffs
7	Kussharo	Hokkaidō	170	39.3	Kp-1, Kutcharo Shoro Ash
7	Phlegraean Fields	Campanian volcanic arc	430 - 680	39.9	Campanian Ignimbrite Eruption
5	Galeras	Andes, Northern Volcanic Zone	Unknown	40	
6	Ksudach	Kamchatka	40	40	Caldera I
6	Ugashik-Peulik	SW Alaska, Aleutian Arc	30	40	Caldera formation
6?	Ulleung	South Korea	10?	40	Ulleungdo-Yamato tephra
6	Irosin Caldera	Bicol-Leyte Volcanic Arc	70	41	Irosin Ignimbrites
6	Qualibou	Saint Lucia, Lesser Antilles island arc	11	42.3	Choiseul Tuff
6	Mount St. Helens	Cascade Volcanic Arc	10.3	42.5	C (Cs, Cy, Cm, Cw, Ct) (Ape Canyon)
6	Kuttara	Hokkaidō	14.4 DRE	43 (Note: The up is covered with Shikotsu caldera formation deposits.)	Kt-1
7	Uzon-Geyzernaya calderas	Kamchatka	150	43.6	Uzon ignimbrite - northern field
6	Golovnin	Kunashir, Kuril Islands	15	43.7	Kn III-5 Tephra
6	Mount Akagi	Honshū	25.9	44	Akagi-Kanuma pumice
6	Mendeleev	Kunashir, Kuril Islands	60	44.5	caldera formation
7	Opala	Kamchatka	225	44.5	caldera formation
5-6	Naruko	Honshū	5 - 10	45	Yanagisawa Tuff
7	Nemo Peak	Onekotan, Kuril Islands	>115	45	Nemo I
6	Smith Island	Izu–Bonin–Mariana Arc	49	45	
7	Shikotsu	Hokkaidō	350 - 390	46	caldera formation

== 50 to 99KA ==
VEI	Volcano/complex	Volcanic arc/belt, subregion, or hotspot	Material volume (km^{3})	Age in Ka	Tephra or eruption name
6	Kuttara	Hokkaidō	10.2 DRE	50	Kt-2
7	Ōkataina Volcanic Complex	Taupō Volcanic Zone	>100 DRE	50	Rotoiti Ignimbrite
6	Phlegraean Fields	Campanian volcanic arc	13.1	51	Santa Lucia Tephra
7	Lake Maninjau	Sunda Arc, Sumatra	235	52	Maninjau paroxysmal welded and unwelded tuffs
6	Mount Kujū	Kyūshū	12	53.5	Kuju-Handa pyroclastic flow (Kj-Hd), Kuju-1 Pumice (Kj-P1)
6	Skaros Caldera, Santorini	South Aegean Volcanic Arc	13.75	54	Upper Scoriae 2
6	Kuttara	Hokkaidō	20.1 DRE	50 - 60	Kt-3
5	Torfajökull	Iceland	4 DRE	55.4	Þórsmörk ignimbrite and Greenland II-RHY-1
6	Ischia	Campanian volcanic arc	≥ 10	56	X2
6	Ischia	Campanian volcanic arc	40	56	Monte Epomeo Green Tuff
6	Daisen	Honshū	40	59.6	Daisen-Kurayoshi Pumice
6	Shikotsu	Hokkaidō	50	60	Shadai eruption
6	Towada	Honshū	10	61	eruption episode Q
6	Newberry Volcano	Cascade Volcanic Arc	> 12.5	62.5	Olema tephra, Paulina tephra
6	Hakone	Honshū	20	66	Hakone-Tokyo Pumice
6	Akademia Nauk	Kamchatka	12.5	69.4	Odnoboky O2 tuffs
6	Los Humeros	Trans-Mexican Volcanic Belt	37	69	Zaragoza Tuff
6	Los Humeros	Trans-Mexican Volcanic Belt	24	70	Faby Tuff
6	Pico do Fogo	Cape Verde	Unknown	73	
5-6	Naruko	Honshū	5 - 10	73	Nisaka Tuff
8	Lake Toba Caldera	Sunda Arc, Sumatra	2,800 - 5,300	74	Youngest Toba Tuff (Note: The eruption of Lake Toba was the biggest volcanic eruption in the Quaternary period.)
6	Barrier Volcano	Great Rift Valley, Kenya	10	74	caldera formation
6	Kuttara	Hokkaidō	> 11 DRE	75	Kt-4
6	Phlegraean Fields	Campanian volcanic arc	12.35	80	CA-1a Tephra
6	Bolshoy Semyachik	Kamchatka	42	80	Bol'shoi Semiachik Caldera II
6	Hakone	Honshū	10	80	Hakone-Obaradai Pumice
7?	Mount Pinatubo	Luzon Volcanic Arc	25	81	Inararo Tuff
6	Etna	Campanian volcanic arc	10	82.8	X4; I-7
8	Lago de Atitlán	Central America Volcanic Arc, Guatemala	1,220	84	Los Chocoyos eruption
6	Kuttara	Hokkaidō	16.8 DRE	84	Kt-6
6	Kussharo	Hokkaidō	25	85	Kp-2/3
6	Kuttara	Hokkaidō	10.8 DRE	84 - 87	Kt-7
7-8	Mount Aso	Kyūshū	930 - 1,860	87	Aso-4 Ignimbrite
6	Kuttara	Hokkaidō	9.9 DRE	87 - 106	Kt-8

== 100 to 299KA ==
VEI	Volcano/complex	Volcanic arc/belt, subregion, or hotspot	Material volume (km^{3})	Age in Ka	Tephra or eruption name
7	Kikai Caldera	Ryukyu Islands	Unknown	100	Tozurahara eruption
6	Sierra la Primavera	Trans-Mexican Volcanic Belt	90	100	Tala Tuff
6	Skaros Caldera, Santorini	South Aegean Volcanic Arc	14	100	Middle Pumice
6	Ontake	Honshū	50	100	Ontake-1 Pumice
6	Rabaul	Bismarck Volcanic Arc	10?	100	Boroi Ignimbrites
6	Rabaul	Bismarck Volcanic Arc	10?	100	Malaguna Pyroclastics
7	Ata Caldera	Kyūshū	350	100	Ata pyroclastic deposits
6	Sanbe	Honshū	20	105	Sanbe-Kisuki pumice
6	Mount Sunda	Sunda Arc, Java	≥ 10	105	Sunda Caldera
7	Lake Tōya	Hokkaidō	230 – 310	106	
6	Santo Antão	Cape Verde	10.33	106	Cão Grande I
6	Phlegraean Fields	Campanian volcanic arc	≥ 10	106.2	X5
6	Phlegraean Fields	Campanian volcanic arc	≥ 10	108.9	X6
7	Kussharo	Hokkaidō	175	117.5	Kp-4, Kutcharo Haboro Ash
7	Emmons Lake caldera	SW Alaska, Aleutian Arc	220	124	Old Craw Tephra
7	Mount Aso	Kyūshū	> 150	130	Aso-3 Ignimbrite
6	Mount Aso	Kyūshū	50	141	Aso-2 Ignimbrite
6	Yellowstone Caldera	Yellowstone hotspot	23?	143	Cold Mountain Creek Tuff
7	Calabozos	Andes, Southern Volcanic Zone	Unknown	150	Loma Seca Tuff-Unit S
5	Galeras	Andes, Northern Volcanic Zone	Unknown	150	
7	Kos-Nisyros Caldera	South Aegean Volcanic Arc	110	161	Kos Plateau Tuff
7	Los Humeros	Trans-Mexican Volcanic Belt	290 DRE	164	Xáltipan Ignimbrite
7	Lake Akan	Hokkaidō	56.8 (DRE)	175	AK-2
6	Yellowstone Caldera	Yellowstone hotspot	50	176	Bluff Point Tuff
≥6	Karymsky (volcano)	Kamchatka	≥49.82	177	Rauchua Tephra
7	Southern Caldera, Santorini	South Aegean Volcanic Arc	Unknown	180	
7	Awasa Caldera	Main Ethiopian Rift	103.5	182.3	
7	Phlegraean Fields	Campanian volcanic arc	Unknown	205	
7	Rotorua Caldera	Taupō Volcanic Zone	Unknown	230	Mamaku Ignimbrite
7	Maroa Caldera	Taupō Volcanic Zone	Unknown	230	Ohakuri Ignimbrite
7	Reporoa Caldera	Taupō Volcanic Zone	Unknown	230	Kaingaroa Ignimbrite
7	Ata Caldera	Kyūshū	> 150	240	Torihama eruption
7	Kapenga Caldera	Taupō Volcanic Zone	Unknown	240	Ohakui Ignimbrite
7	O'a Caldera	Ethiopia	276	240	Qi3 Pumice
8	Maroa Caldera	Taupō Volcanic Zone	Unknown	254	Whakamaru Ignimbrite
6	Mount Aso	Kyūshū	Unknown	266	Aso-1 Ignimbrite
6	Uzon-Geyzernaya calderas	Kamchatka	46	278	Uzon ignimbrite - southern field
7	Haroharo Caldera	Taupō Volcanic Zone	Unknown	280	Matahina Ignimbrite
7	Kapenga Caldera	Taupō Volcanic Zone	Unknown	280	Pakai Ignimbrite
7	Lake Maninjau	Sunda Arc, Sumatra	175	280	

== 300 to 999KA ==
VEI	Volcano/complex	Volcanic arc/belt, subregion, or hotspot	Material volume (km^{3})	Age in Ka	Tephra or eruption name
7	Calabozos	Andes, Southern Volcanic Zone	Unknown	300	Loma Seca Tuff-Unit V
7	Kapenga Caldera	Taupō Volcanic Zone	Unknown	300	Chimpanzee Ignimbrite
7	Vulsini	Campanian volcanic arc	460	300	Bolsena Caldera
7	Phlegraean Fields	Campanian volcanic arc	Unknown	320	
7	Kakutō Caldera	Kyūshū	Unknown	321	Kakuto Ignimbrite
7?	Suiendani	Honshū	Unknown	370	Okuhida Pyroclastics
7	Lake Bracciano	Lazio, Italy	> 200	370	Mophi Tephra
6	Roccamonfina Caldera	Campanian volcanic arc	Unknown	390	
6-7	Medvezhia	Iturup, Kuril Islands	90	410	Medvezhia Ignimbrite
7	Toussidé	Tibesti Mountains	150	430	Yirrigué Ignimbrite
7	Pauzhetka Caldera	Kamchatka	375	440	Golygin Ignimbrite
7	Tumalo	Oregon	Unknown	440	Tumalo tuff
7	Aira Caldera	Kyūshū	Unknown	450	Oda Ignimbrite
7	Diamante Caldera	Andes, Southern Volcanic Zone	Unknown	450	
7	Aira Caldera	Kyūshū	Unknown	500	Yoshino Ignimbrite
7	Toba Caldera	Sunda Arc, Sumatra	138	500	Middle Toba Tuff
7	Kobayashi Caldera	Kyūshū	Unknown	520	Kobayashi Ignimbrite
6	Bolshoy Semyachik	Kamchatka	42	524	
6	Cordillera de Apaneca	El Salvador	63	525	Concepcion de Ataco caldera formation
6	Bolshoy Semyachik	Kamchatka	42	560	
6	Galeras	Andes, Northern Volcanic Zone	Unknown	560	
7	Mount Kirishima	Kyūshū	Unknown	580	Hiwaki Ignimbrite
6?	Hōhi Volcanic Zone	Kyūshū	Unknown	600	Yufugawa Ignimbrite
6	Mount Lassen	Cascade Volcanic Arc	> 75	610	Rockland Caldera formation
8	Yellowstone Plateau Volcanic Field	Yellowstone hotspot	⩾ 1,000	631	Lava Creek Tuff
7	Acatlán Volcanic Field	Trans-Mexican Volcanic Belt	150	650	Acatlán Ignimbrite
7	Hōhi Volcanic Zone	Kyūshū	Unknown	650	Seiganji-Toga Tephra
7	Kamitakara	Honshū	Unknown	650	
7	Kapenga Caldera	Taupō Volcanic Zone	Unknown	680	Matahana A
7	Kapenga Caldera	Taupō Volcanic Zone	Unknown	710	Waiotapu Ignimbrite
5	Aguajito	Baja California	2	760	Caldera formation
7	Long Valley Caldera	Eastern California	790	760	Bishop Tuff
7	Kapenga Caldera	Taupō Volcanic Zone	Unknown	830	Matahana B
7	Calabozos	Andes, Southern Volcanic Zone	Unknown	840	Loma Seca Tuff-Unit L
8	Lake Toba Caldera	Sunda Arc, Sumatra	5,290	840	Toba Tuff
7	Shishimuta Caldera	Kyūshū	Unknown	870	Imaichi Ignimbrite
7	Mangakino Caldera	Taupō Volcanic Zone	Unknown	950	Marshall Ignimbrite
7	Mangakino Caldera	Taupō Volcanic Zone	Unknown	970	Unit E

== 1 to 9.9MA ==
VEI	Volcano/complex	Volcanic arc/belt, subregion, or hotspot	Material volume (km^{3})	Age in Ma	Tephra or eruption name
7	North Vate	Vanuatu	Unknown	1	Efaté Pumice Formation
7	Mangakino Caldera	Taupō Volcanic Zone	Unknown	1	Rocky Hill Ignimbrite
7	Shishimuta Caldera	Kyūshū	Unknown	1	Yabakei Ignimbrite
7	Tamagawa Caldera	Honshū	Unknown	1	
7	Tōnohetsuri Calderas	Honshū	Unknown	1	Saigō Ignimbrite
7	Tokachi-Mitsumata Caldera	Hokkaidō	> 130	1	
8	Mangakino Caldera	Taupō Volcanic Zone	Unknown	1.01	Kidnappers Ignimbrite
8	Awasa Caldera	Main Ethiopian Rift	1000	1.09	
8	Gakkel Ridge Caldera	Gakkel Ridge, Arctic Ocean	3000	1.1	
7	Akademia Nauk	Kamchatka	100	1.13	Stena-Soboliny Ignimbrite
7	Kulshan Caldera	Cascade Volcanic Arc	> 117.5	1.149	Lake Tapps Tephra, Swift Creek Ignimbrite, Kulshan caldera formation
7	Mangakino Caldera	Taupō Volcanic Zone	Unknown	1.18	Ahuroa Ignimbrite
7	Hōhi Volcanic Zone	Kyūshū	Unknown	1.2	Shikido Ignimbrite
6	Toba Caldera	Sunda Arc, Sumatra	Unknown	1.2	Haranggoal Dacite Tuff
7	Tōnohetsuri Calderas	Honshū	Unknown	1.2	Ashino Ignimbrite
7	Mangakino Caldera	Taupō Volcanic Zone	Unknown	1.2	Unit D
8	Mangakino Caldera	Taupō Volcanic Zone	Unknown	1.21	Ongatiti Ignimbrite
7	Valles Caldera	Raton hotspot	690	1.223	Upper Bandelier Tuff
7	Yellowstone Plateau Volcanic Field	Yellowstone hotspot	> 280 (DRE)	1.27	Mesa Falls Tuff
7	Puricó Complex	Andes, Central Volcanic Zone	Unknown	1.3	Puricó Ignimbrite
7	Tōnohetsuri Calderas	Honshū	Unknown	1.4	Kumado Ignimbrite
7	Mount Tokachi	Hokkaidō	Unknown	1.4	Tokachi Ignimbrite
7	Mangakino Caldera	Taupō Volcanic Zone	Unknown	1.4	Unit C
7	Mangakino Caldera	Taupō Volcanic Zone	Unknown	1.53	Unit B
7	Mangakino Caldera	Taupō Volcanic Zone	Unknown	1.55	Unit A
7	Mount Jiigatake	Honshū	Unknown	1.6	Ōmine Ignimbrite
7	Valles Caldera	New Mexico, USA	690	1.61	Lower Bandelier Tuff
7	Mount Jiigatake	Honshū	Unknown	1.65	
6	Cerro Guacha	Altiplano-Puna volcanic complex	Unknown	1.7	Puripica Chico ignimbrite
7	Young Island	Valleny Islands	100	1.7	Eltanin
7	Bolshe-Bannaya	Kamchatka	800	1.7	
7	Mount Hotakadake	Honshū	Unknown	1.75	Ebisutōge-Fukuda tephras
7	Mount Hotakadake	Honshū	Unknown	1.76	Nyūkawa Ignimbrite
7	Valles Caldera	New Mexico, USA	⩾ 100	1.78	San Diego Canyon Ignimbrite
7	Karymshina	Kamchatka	Unknown	1.78	
7	Lago de Atitlán	Central America Volcanic Arc, Guatemala	Unknown	1.8	
7	Mount Jiigatake	Honshū	Unknown	1.88	Kitazawa Ignimbrite
7	Mount Tokachi	Hokkaidō	Unknown	1.9	Biei Ignimbrite
7	Mount Jiigatake	Honshū	Unknown	2	Reishōji Ignimbrite
7	Mount Jiigatake	Honshū	Unknown	2	Ht-3 Ignimbrite
7	Mount Jiigatake	Honshū	Unknown	2	Nyūnomi Ignimbrite
7	Mount Jiigatake	Honshū	Unknown	2	Ichiuda Ignimbrite
7	Mount Hotakadake	Honshū	Unknown	2	Sonehara Ignimbrite
7	Tamagawa Caldera	Honshū	Unknown	2	
6?	Mount Tondano	Sulawesi	~70 (DRE)	2	Domato Tuff
8	Yellowstone Plateau Volcanic Field	Yellowstone hotspot	2160	2.0794	Huckleberry Ridge Tuff A & B
7	Yellowstone Plateau Volcanic Field	Yellowstone hotspot	290	2.113	Huckleberry Ridge Tuff C
7	Mount Jiigatake	Honshū	Unknown	2.18	Taniguchi Ignimbrite
8	Cerro Galán	Andes, Central Volcanic Zone	1030	2.2	Cerro Galán Ignimbrite
7?	Mount Erciyes	Turkey	Unknown	2.52	Valibabatepe Ignimbrite
^^^^Quaternary^^^^
7	Hiwada Caldera	Honshū	Unknown	2.8	Hotokezawa Ignimbrite
8	Pastos Grandes Caldera	Andes, Central Volcanic Zone	1500	2.9	Pastos Grandes Ignimbrite
7	Teragi Cauldron	Honshū	Unknown	3.03	Teragi Group
7	Cerro Guacha	Altiplano-Puna volcanic complex	Unknown	3.5	Tara Ignimbrite
7	Yunosawa Caldera	Honshū	Unknown	3.5	Obirakiyama Tuff
8	Pacana Caldera	Andes, Central Volcanic Zone	2800	4	Atana Ignimbrite
8	Heise volcanic field	Yellowstone hotspot	Unknown	4.45	Kilgore Tuff
?	Heise volcanic field	Yellowstone hotspot	Unknown	5.51	Conant Creek Tuff
8	Cerro Guacha	Altiplano-Puna volcanic complex	1300	5.7	Guacha ignimbrite
7	Cerro Panizos	Andes, Central Volcanic Zone	Unknown	6.1	Panizos Ignimbrite
?	Heise volcanic field	Yellowstone hotspot	Unknown	6.27	Walcott Tuff
8	Heise volcanic field	Yellowstone hotspot	Unknown	6.62	Blacktail Tuff
7	Black Mountain Caldera	Southwest Nevada volcanic field	Unknown	7	Thirsty Canyon Tuff
7	Pastos Grandes Caldera or Vilama Caldera	Andes, Central Volcanic Zone	Unknown	8.3	Sifon Ignimbrite
?	Twin Falls volcanic field	Yellowstone hotspot	Unknown	8.6-10	
8	Grey's Landing Supereruption	Yellowstone hotspot	> 2800	8.72	Grey's Landing Ignimbrite
8	McMullen Supereruption	Yellowstone hotspot	> 1700	8.99	McMullen Ignimbrite

== 10MA and older ==
VEI	Volcano/complex	Volcanic arc/belt, subregion, or hotspot	Material volume (km^{3})	Age in Ma	Tephra or eruption name
?	Picabo volcanic field	Yellowstone hotspot	Unknown	10 – 10.2	Arbon Valley Tuffs
7-8	Bruneau-Jarbidge caldera	Yellowstone hotspot	950	10 – 12.5	Ashfall Fossil Beds eruption
7	Timber Mountain caldera complex	Southwest Nevada volcanic field	Unknown	11.45	Timber Mountain Tuff - Ammonia Tanks member
8	Timber Mountain caldera complex	Southwest Nevada volcanic field	Unknown	11.6	Timber Mountain Tuff - Rainer Mesa member
8	Paintbrush Caldera	Southwest Nevada volcanic field	Unknown	12.7	Paintbrush Tuff - Topopah Spring member
8	Paintbrush Caldera	Southwest Nevada volcanic field	Unknown	12.8	Paintbrush Tuff - Tiva Canyon member
7	Mount Sobo	Kyūshū	Unknown	12.8	
?	Owyhee-Humboldt volcanic field	Yellowstone hotspot	Unknown	13.9-12.8	
7	Mount Katamuki	Kyūshū	Unknown	13	
7	Silent Canyon caldera complex	Southwest Nevada volcanic field	Unknown	13	Belted Range Tuff
7	Crater Flat Group	Southwest Nevada volcanic field	Unknown	13.25	Crater Flat Tuff, Bullfrog member
7	Shitara Caldera	Honshū	Unknown	15.1-13.1	
8	Ōdai Caldera	Honshū	Unknown	13.7	Murō Ignimbrite
8	Mount Ōkue	Kyūshū	Unknown	13.7	Okueyama volcano-plutonic complex
7	Mount Ishizuchi	Shikoku	Unknown	14	
8	Kumano Caldera	Honshū	Unknown	14.4	Kumano Acidic rocks
8	Source unknown	Andes, Central Volcanic Zone	1100	15	Huaylillas Ignimbrite
7	McDermitt volcanic field, North	Yellowstone hotspot	Unknown	15	Whitehorse Creek Tuff
?	Lake Owyhee volcanic field	Yellowstone hotspot?	Unknown	15	
8	Mount Osuzu	Kyūshū	Unknown	15.1	Osuzuyama volcano-plutonic complex
?	Northwest Nevada volcanic field	Yellowstone hotspot?	Unknown	16.5-15.5	
7	McDermitt volcanic field, South	Yellowstone hotspot	Unknown	15.6	Longridge Tuff member 2-3
7	McDermitt volcanic field, South	Yellowstone hotspot	Unknown	15.6	Longridge Tuff member 5
7	McDermitt volcanic field, South	Yellowstone hotspot	Unknown	15.7	Double H Tuff
7	McDermitt volcanic field, North	Yellowstone hotspot	Unknown	15.8	Trout Creek Mountains Tuff
?	McDermitt volcanic field, South	Yellowstone hotspot	Unknown	16	Hoppin Peaks Tuff
7	McDermitt volcanic field, South	Yellowstone hotspot	Unknown	16.5	Oregon Canyon Tuff
8	Oxaya Formation	Andes, Central Volcanic Zone	3000	19	Oxaya Ignimbrite
7	Mount Belknap Caldera	Marysvale volcanic field	Unknown	19	Joe Lott member
7	Semilir	Sunda Arc, Java	480	21	Semilir eruption
^^^^Neogene^^^^
7	Monroe Peak Caldera	Marysvale volcanic field	Unknown	23	Osiris Tuff
8	La Garita Caldera	San Juan volcanic field	5000	27.8	Fish Canyon Tuff (Note: Second biggest explosive eruption in the last 100 million years)
8?	Bachelor	San Juan volcanic field	1000	28	Carpenter Ridge Tuff
8	San Juan	San Juan volcanic field	Unknown	28	Sapinero Mesa Tuff
8?	Uncompahgre	San Juan volcanic field	1000	28.1	Dillon & Sapinero Mesa Tuffs
8?	Platoro	San Juan volcanic field	1000	28.2	Chiquito Peak Tuff
8	Bursum	Southern New Mexico	Unknown	28.5	Apache Springs Tuff
8	White Rock Caldera	Indian Peak-Caliente Caldera Complex	Unknown	29.2	Lund Tuff
8	Sana'a Ignimbrite	Afro-Arabian	Unknown	29.5	Tephra 2W63
8	Iftar Alkalb	Afro-Arabian	Unknown	29.5	Tephra 4 W
8	Sam Ignimbrite	Yemen	Unknown	29.5	Green Tuff
8	Jabal Kura'a Ignimbrite	Yemen	Unknown	29.6	
8	Wah Wah Springs Caldera	Indian Peak-Caliente Caldera Complex	5900	30.06	Wah Wah Springs Tuff (Note: The biggest explosive eruption in the last 100 million years)
8	Windows Butte Tuff	Central Nevada	Unknown	33	Windows Butte Tuff
8	Emory Caldera	Southwestern New Mexico	Unknown	34.9	Kneeling Nun Tuff, City of Rocks State Park
8	Mount Princeton	Thirtynine Mile volcanic area, Colorado	Unknown	35.3	Wall Mountain Tuff
7	Bennett Lake Volcanic Complex	Skukum Group	Unknown	50	
^^^^Paleogene^^^^
8	Deccan Traps	West-central India	Unknown	66	This volcanic episode occurred about 300,000 years after the Chicxulub meteor impact, and may have been another contributing factor towards the extinction of the dinosaurs
8	Source unknown	Honshū	Unknown	70	Noi Rhyolite
8	Ontong-Java-Manihiki-Hikurangi Plateau	Southwestern Pacific Ocean, north of the Solomon Islands	Unknown	121	Existence as a single volcano is controversial. Possibly a volcanic chain.
8	Guarapuava-Tamarana-Sarusas	Paraná and Etendeka traps	Unknown	132	Existence as a single volcano is controversial. Possibly a volcanic chain.
8	Santa Maria Fria	Paraná and Etendeka traps	Unknown	132	Existence as a single volcano is controversial. Possibly a volcanic chain.
8	Guarapuava-Ventura	Paraná and Etendeka traps	Unknown	132	Existence as a single volcano is controversial. Possibly a volcanic chain.
8	High Island Caldera	Hong Kong	Unknown	140	
^^^^Cretaceous^^^^
8	Ora Caldera	Southern Alps, Italy	Unknown	277–274	Ora Formation
7	Altenberg–Teplice Caldera	The Altenberg-Teplice Volcanic Complex	Unknown	325-317	Teplice Rhyolite intra-caldera deposits
8	Cerberean Caldera	Rubicon Valley	Unknown	374	Cerberean Caldera now forms the northern part of the Marysville Igneous Complex in central Victoria at Lake Eildon National Park.
8	Glen Coe	Scotland	Unknown	420	
8	Scafells	Lake District	Unknown	450+	

== See also ==
- Geologic time scale
- Timeline of volcanism on Earth
- List of large-volume volcanic eruptions in the Basin and Range Province
