= Sobo-Katamuki Quasi-National Park =

Quasi-national park in Japan

- 祖母傾国定公園
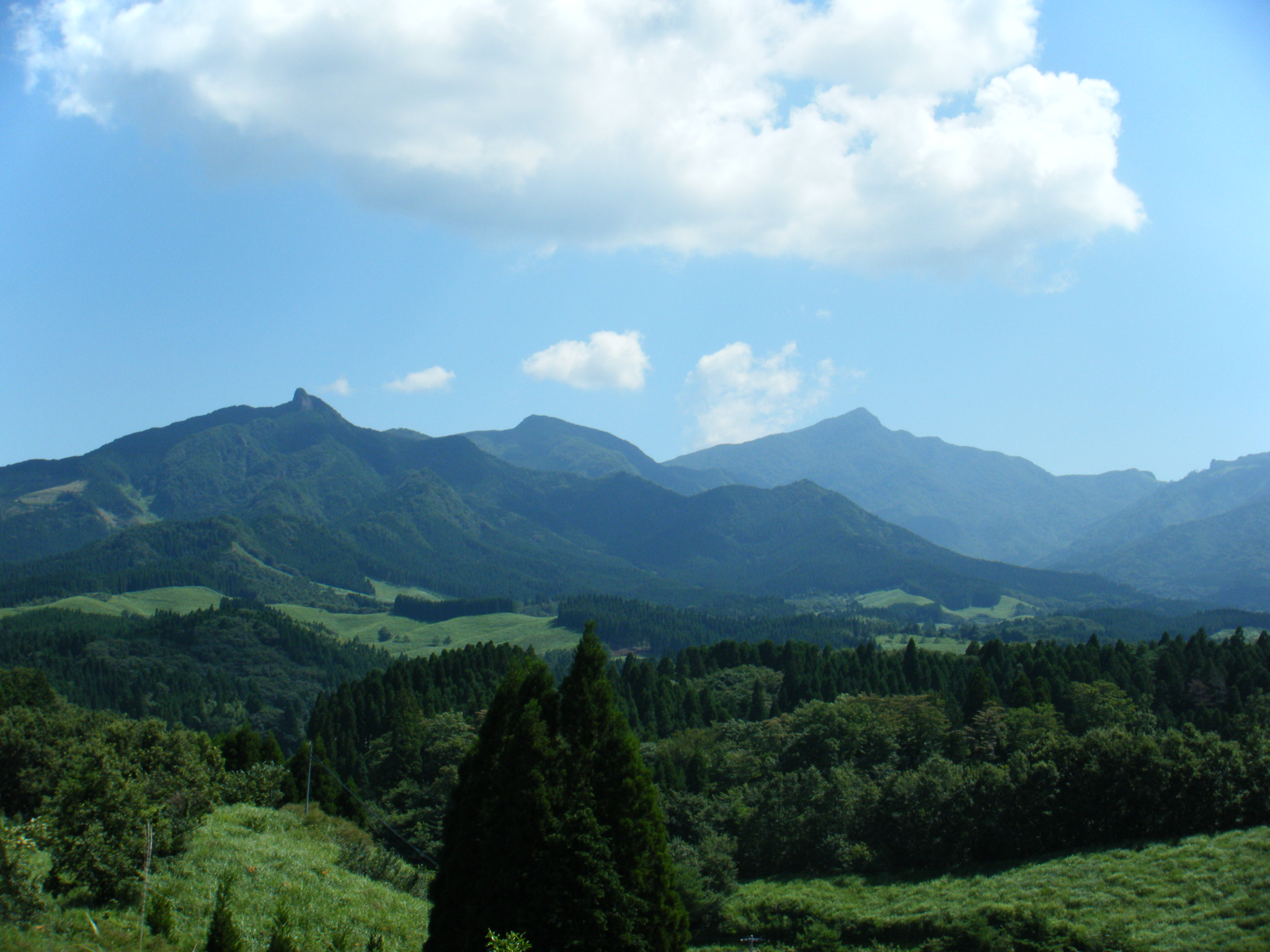
- Mount Sobo

- Location within Japan
- Location: Ōita/Miyazaki Prefectures, Japan
- Coordinates: 32°43′41″N 131°24′36″E
- Area: 220 km^{2} (85 sq mi)
- Established: 25 March 1965

Sobo-Katamuki Quasi-National Park (祖母傾国定公園, Sobo-Katamuki Kokutei Kōen) was a Quasi-National Park in Ōita and Miyazaki Prefectures, Japan. It was in 2017 incorporated in to the Sobo, Katamuki and Okue Biosphere Reserve.

Established in 1965, the park derived its name from Mount Sobo (1,756 m (5,761 ft)) and Mount Katamuki (傾山) (1,602 m (5,256 ft)). The Quasi-National Park borders two homonymous Prefectural Parks, namely the Sobo Katamuki Prefectural Natural Park (Ōita) and Sobo Katamuki Prefectural Natural Park (Miyazaki).

== Related municipalities ==
- Miyazaki: Gokase, Hinokage, Nobeoka, Takachiho
- Ōita: Bungo-ōno, Saiki, Taketa

== See also ==
- List of national parks of Japan
