= Sobo Katamuki Prefectural Natural Park (Miyazaki) =

Natural park in Miyazaki prefecture, Japan

- 祖母傾県立自然公園
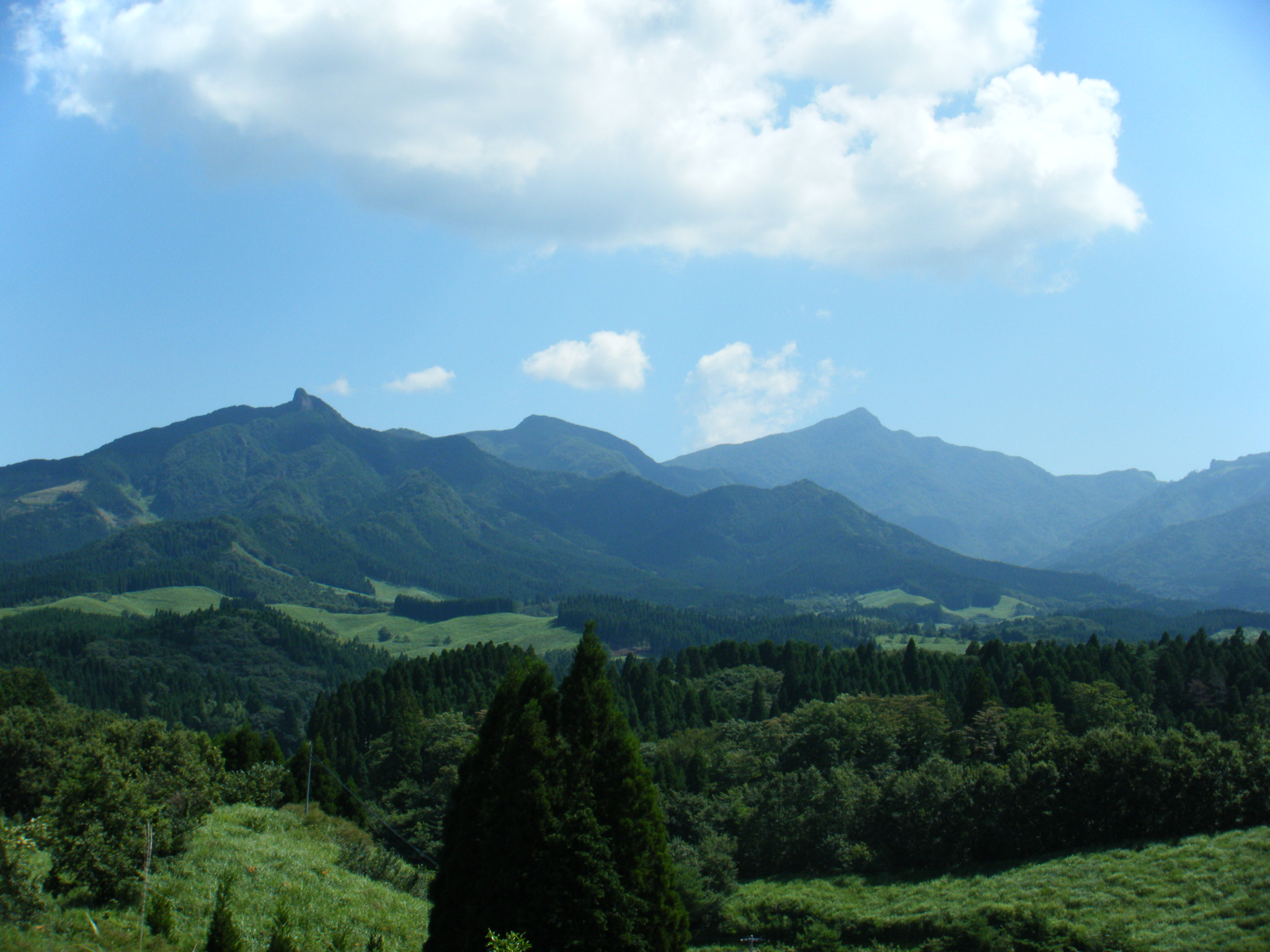
- Mount Sobo
- Interactive map of Sobo Katamuki Prefectural Natural Park
- Location: Miyazaki Prefecture, Japan
- Area: 269.70 km^{2} (104.13 sq mi)
- Established: 1 September 1958

Sobo Katamuki Prefectural Natural Park (祖母傾県立自然公園, Sobo Katamuki kenritsu shizen kōen) was a Prefectural Natural Park in northern Miyazaki Prefecture, Japan. In 2017 it was incorporated into the Sobo, Katamuki and Okue Biosphere Reserve.

Established in 1958, the park spanned the municipalities of Hinokage, Nobeoka, and Takachiho. The park encompasses the Gokasho plateau, stretches of the Hinokage and Mōnose rivers, and Mount Mukabaki (行縢山).

== See also ==
- National Parks of Japan
- Sobo-Katamuki Quasi-National Park
- Sobo Katamuki Prefectural Natural Park (Ōita)
