= Sobo, Katamuki and Okue Biosphere Reserve =

Biosphere Reserve in Japan

- 祖母傾大崩ユネスコエコパーク
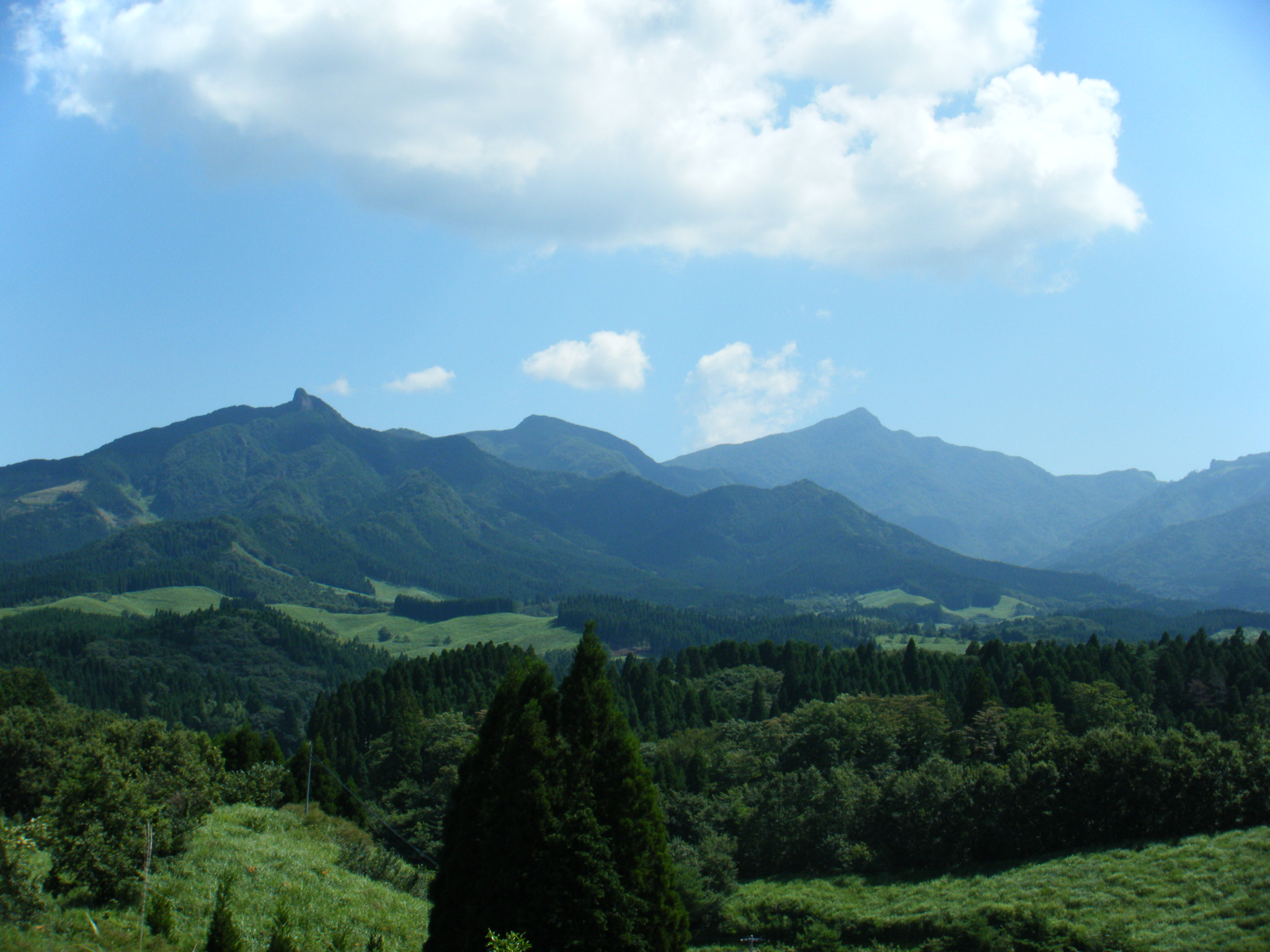
- Mount Sobo
- Interactive map of Sobo, Katamuki and Okue Biosphere Reserve
- Location: Ōita Prefecture and Miyazaki Prefecture, Japan
- Area: 1,580 ha (3,900 acres) core, 17,748 ha (43,860 acres) buffer, 224,344 ha (554,370 acres) transition
- Established: 2017

The Sobo, Katamuki and Okue Biosphere Reserve also known as Sobokatakue Unesco Eco Park (祖母傾大崩ユネスコエコパーク, Sobokatamuki Okuzure yunesukoekopāku) was created in 2017. It incorporates the 1965 quasi national parks of Sobo Katamuki Prefectural Natural Park (Ōita) (also previously known as the Sobo-Katamuki Quasi-National Park, Sobo Katamuki Prefectural Natural Park (祖母傾県立自然公園, Sobo Katamuki kenritsu shizen kōen)) and Sobo Katamuki Prefectural Natural Park (Miyazaki).

== Geography ==
The reserve derives its name from Mount Sobo (1,756 m (5,761 ft)), Mount Katamuki (傾山) (1,602 m (5,256 ft)) and Mount Ōkueyama (大崩山), also known as Mount Ōkue (1,643 m (5,390 ft)). The Quasi-National Park borders two homonymous Prefectural Parks, namely the Sobo Katamuki Prefectural Natural Park (Ōita) and Sobo Katamuki Prefectural Natural Park (Miyazaki).

=== Geology ===
The landforms of the Biosphere Reserve are the heavily modified result of volcanic activity over the last 14 million years. A massive eruption about 13.7 million years ago involved the Okueyama Volcano-plutonic Complex, and measured 8.0 on the Volcanic Explosivity Index. This formed the almost rectangular Okueyama Caldera with the eruption of an estimated dense rock equivalent (DRE) volume of 1,029 km^{3} (247 cu mi) leaving a caldera orientated to NW to SE that was 33 km (21 mi) by 23 km (14 mi) in size. Further eruptions over only a few million years formed the smaller more elliptical Sobo Caldera which was 18 km (11 mi) by 13 km (8.1 mi) in size on a NNE to SSW axis with a DRE erupted volume of 177 km^{3} (42 cu mi) and the Katamukiyama Caldera again on a NW to SE axis which was 11 km (6.8 mi) by 6 km (3.7 mi) in size with a DRE erupted volume of 50 km^{3} (12 cu mi). Later, most recently about 90,000 years ago, mainly the lower lying land was modified by pyroclastic deposits from the Aso Caldera to the west whose eruption was 384 km^{3} (92 cu mi).

== Biosphere ==
There is a large amount of farmland in the large transition zone but the more rugged buffer and core areas are important flora and fauna habitats.

=== Flora ===
In the lower core and buffer areas the cover is by old-growth forest including Japanese beech and Tsuga. Rhododendron kiusianum, Japanese gentian and the Japanese maple grow in great numbers. At higher levels, the vegetation changes from evergreen (glossy-leaved) forest to conifer forest and then to Suzu-take and beech closer to mountain summits. A rare plant Angelica ubatakensis is found in the Sobo mountain range.

=== Fauna ===
The southern range limit of the Special Natural monument (特別天然記念物, tokubetsu tennen kinen-butsu), the Japanese serow lies in the Sobo mountain range. The Sobo salamander, a new species, was found here in 2014. The Japanese national butterfly, the great purple emperor, an endangered species, has been seen. Rare sightings have been made of the Asian black bear. Japanese dormice and sika deer are much more commonly seen.
