= Sobo Katamuki Prefectural Natural Park (Ōita) =

Natural park in Japan

Coordinates: 32°53′54.6″N 131°36′24.5″E

- 祖母傾県立自然公園
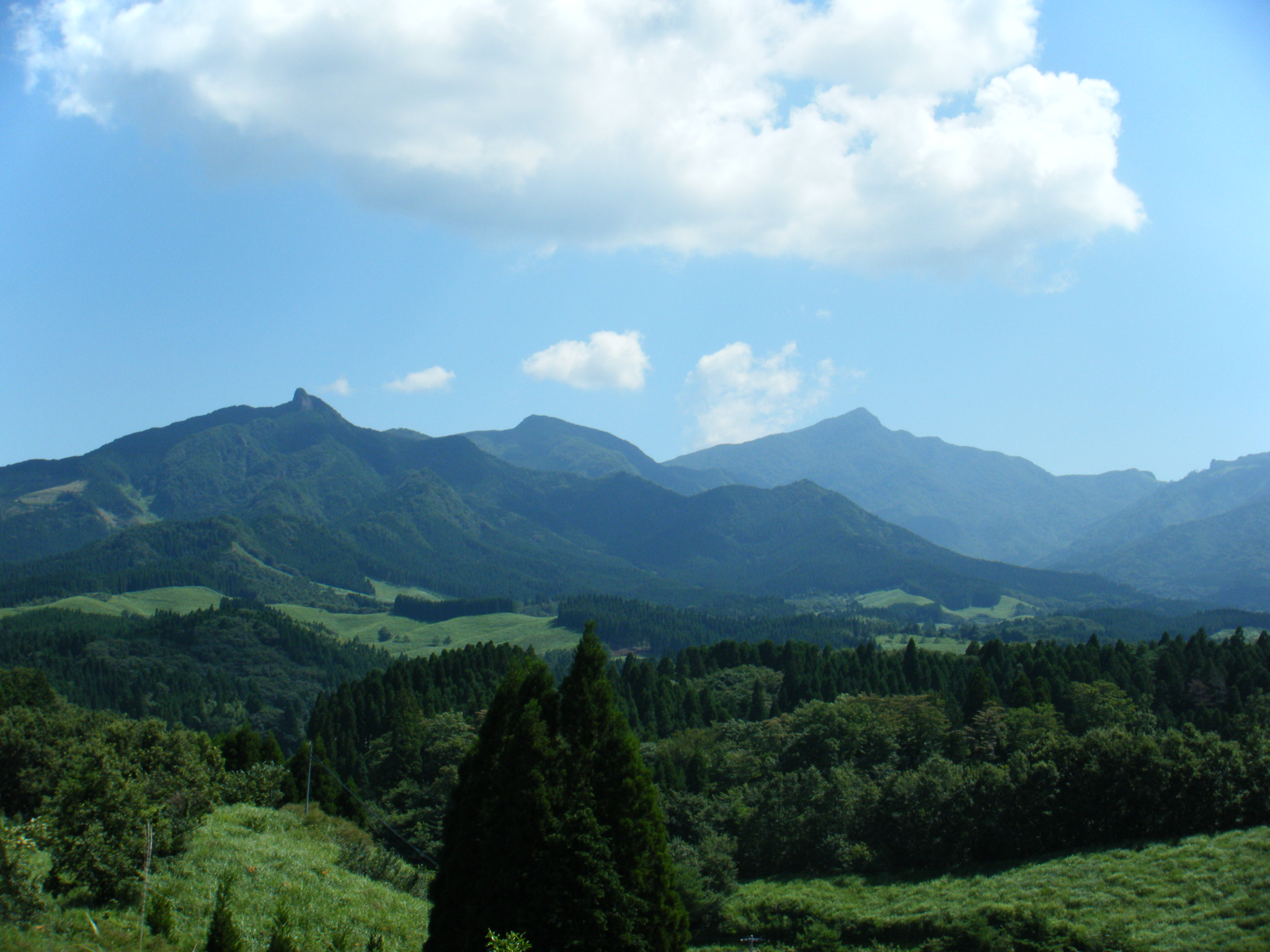
- Mount Sobo
- Interactive map of Sobo Katamuki Prefectural Natural Park
- Location: Ōita Prefecture, Japan
- Area: 141.24 km^{2} (54.53 sq mi)
- Established: 30 March 1951

Sobo Katamuki Prefectural Natural Park (祖母傾県立自然公園, Sobo Katamuki kenritsu shizen kōen) was a Prefectural Natural Park in southern Ōita Prefecture, Japan. Established in 1951, the park spanned the municipalities of Bungo-ōno, Saiki, and Taketa. In 2017 it was incorporated into the Sobo, Katamuki and Okue Biosphere Reserve.

== See also ==
- National Parks of Japan
- Sobo-Katamuki Quasi-National Park
- Sobo Katamuki Prefectural Natural Park (Miyazaki)
