= Mount Katamuki =

Mountain in Kyushu, Japan

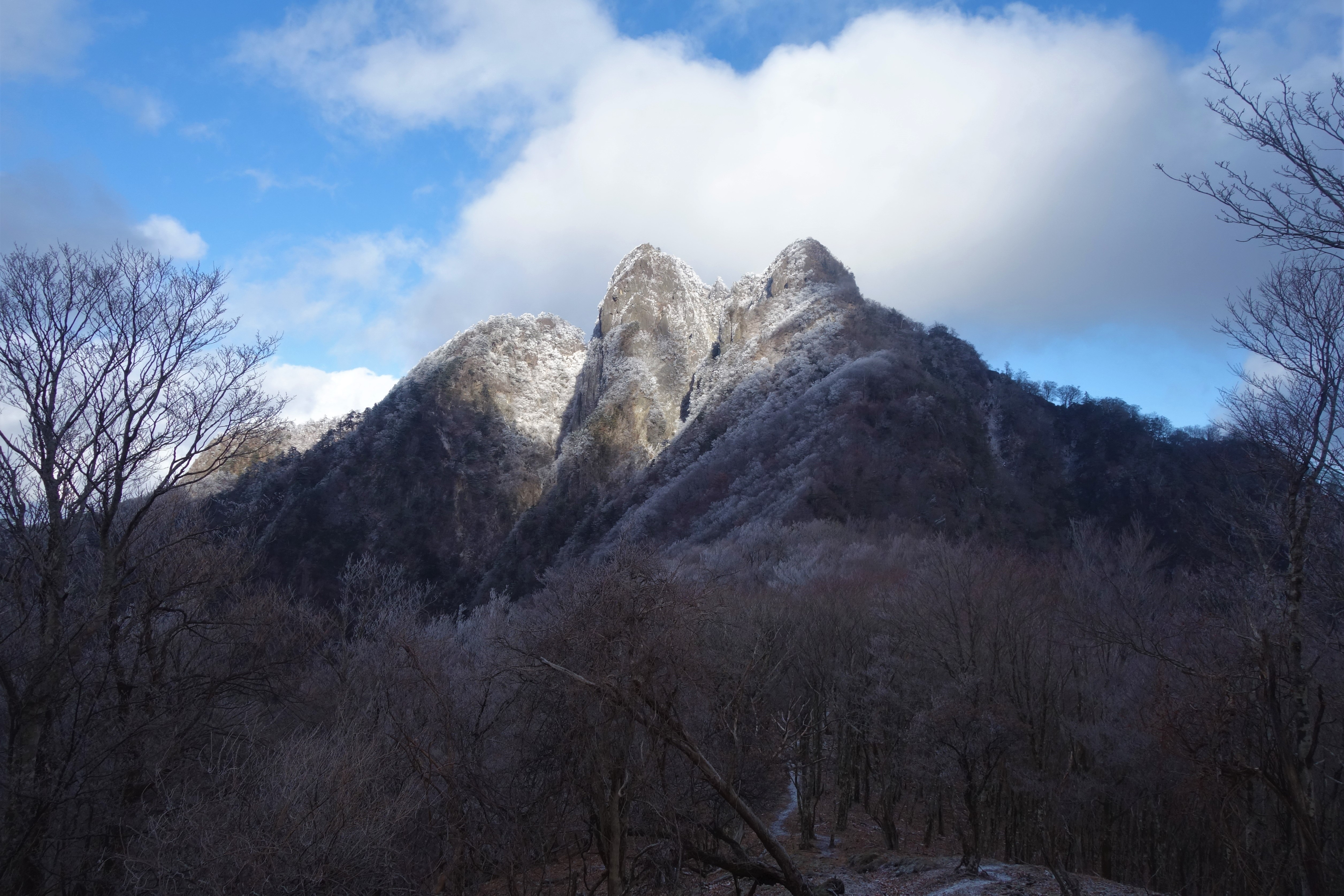
- Mount Katamuki in winter

Highest point
- Elevation: 1,602 m (5,256 ft)
- Coordinates: 32°50′21″N 131°28′33″E

Naming
- Native name: 傾山 (Japanese)
- English translation: "tilting", and was given to this mountain because it tilts toward Mount Sobo

Geography
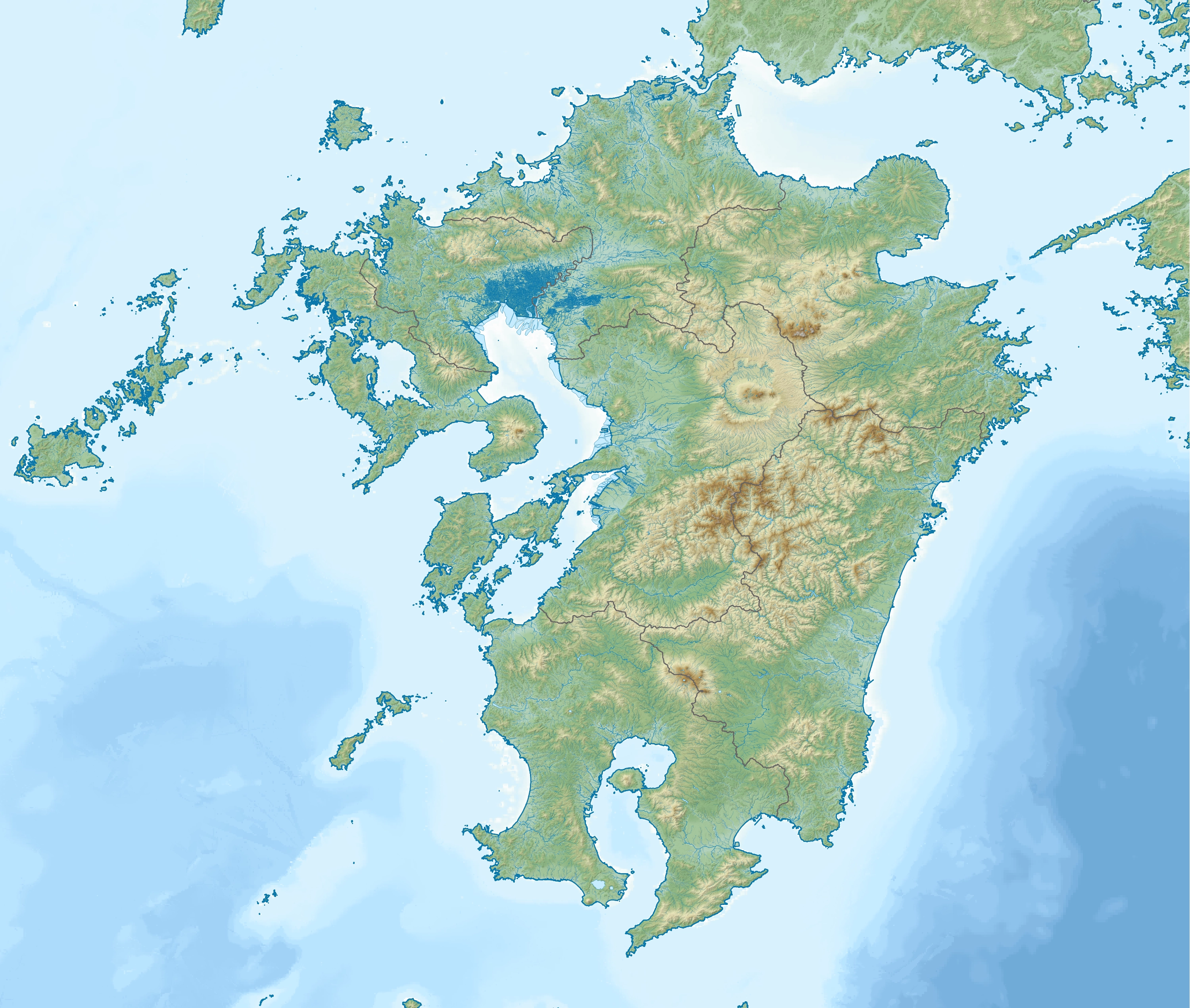
- Location within Kyushu
- Location: Kyūshū, Japan

Climbing
- Easiest route: from Kuori trailhead (all routes are not for inexperienced)

Mount Katamuki (傾山) (1,602 m (5,256 ft)) is at the western end of the Sobo Mountain range in Ōita Prefecture. It is now part of the Sobo, Katamuki and Okue Biosphere Reserve.

== Formation ==
It is believed that the foundation of the Sobo mountain range occurred in two periods of volcanic activity. The first, around 13 million years ago, was buried in the second period of volcanic activity ending about 10 million years ago leaving the landscape seen today. The extinct Katamukiyama Caldera is aligned on a NW to SE axis and was 11 km (6.8 mi) by 6 km (3.7 mi) in size with a DRE erupted volume of 50 km^{3} (12 cu mi). From about 3 million years ago the activity of the Aso volcano caused nearby pyroclastic flow deposition.

== Environment ==
The slopes of the mountain is covered by old-growth forest. Typical species include Japanese beech and hemlock. Going up from the lowland, the vegetation changes from evergreen (glossy-leaved) forest over conifer forest halfway up the mountain, to Suzu-take and beech close to the summit.
