= Semilir eruption =

Major volcanic event

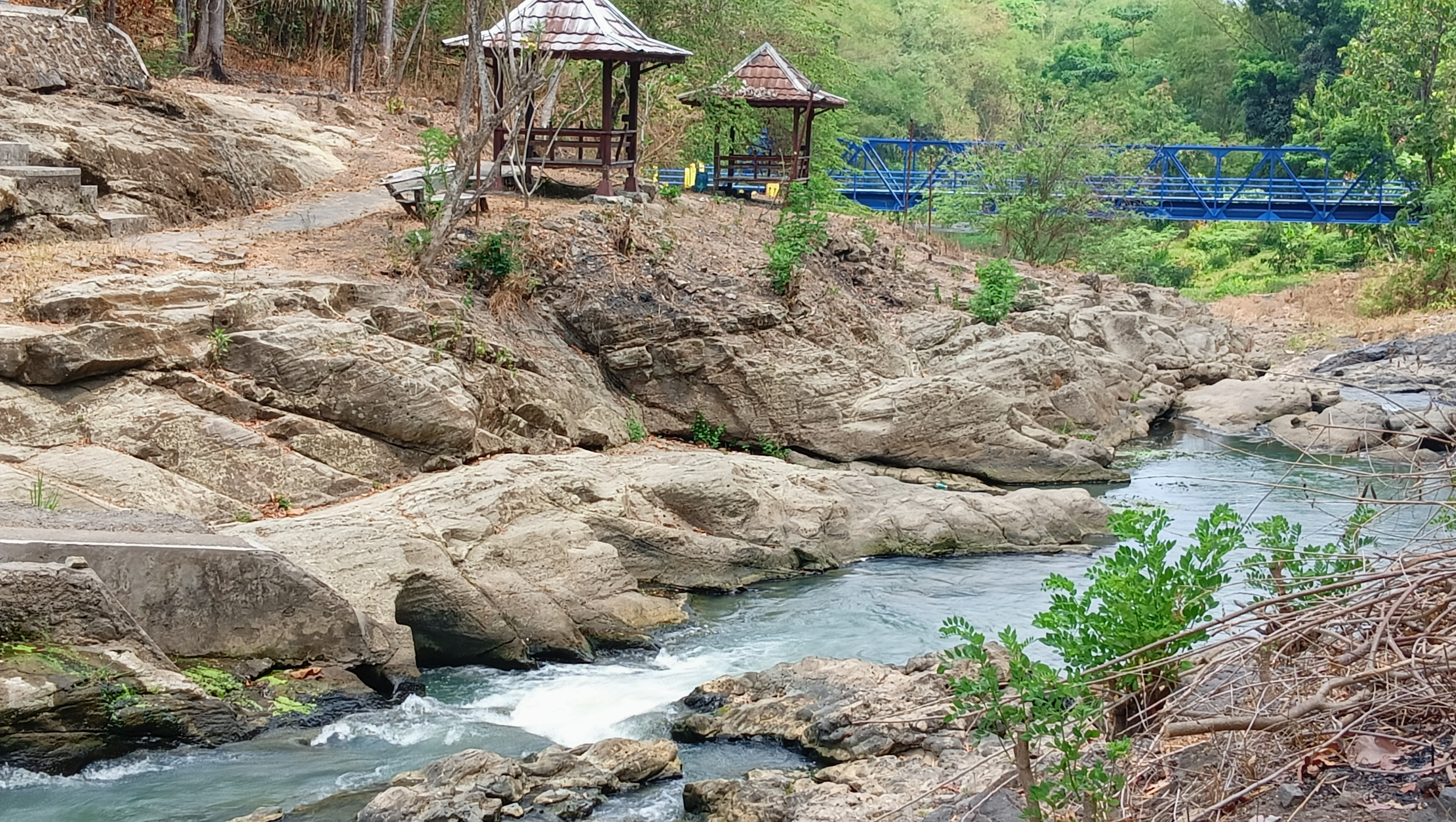
- Semilir Formation by the Opak River, Sleman Regency, Special Region of Yogyakarta
- Date: c. 21 million years ago
- Type: Ultra-Plinian
- Location: Special Region of Yogyakarta, Central Java and East Java, Indonesia
- VEI: 7

The Semilir eruption was a major volcanic event which took place in Indonesia during the Early Miocene. This eruption formed the Semilir Formation and Nglanngran Formation. These two geological formations are in the Southern Mountains of Special Region of Yogyakarta, Central Java and East Java. (Note: Nglanngran Formation rarely exposed on Central and East Java.) The eruption created two formations which consist of mostly pyroclastic rock (minor lava flows). It has an exceptional thickness (at least 1,200 m [3,900 ft]). In contrast, The Toba supereruption only formed 600 m (2,000 ft) of ignimbrite. The estimated Semilir eruption date by isotope method is around 21 million years ago.

== Geology background ==
Java is an island between Asia and Australia at the centre of the Indonesian archipelago where the Indo-Australian plate subducts beneath the Eurasian Plate. There has been subduction at the Java Trench since the Early Cenozoic. An Eocene to Early Miocene volcanic arc in East Java, the Southern Mountains Arc, is parallel to and south of the modern arc. Thick volcanic and volcaniclastic deposits related to this arc are well preserved in East Java and identified volcanic centres are separated by similar distances to volcanoes of the modern arc. New field investigations and stratigraphic studies in East Java have identified the most important features of arc activity in the Southern Mountains. The oldest sedimentary rocks are conglomerates and sandstones that lack volcanic material and were deposited unconformably on a basement that included ophiolitic and continental rocks. In the overlying sedimentary rocks volcanic debris and detrital zircons indicate initiation of the arc, and subduction beneath Java, by the Middle Eocene (42 Ma). The arc was active until the Early Miocene (18 Ma) and volcanic activity was most abundant during the Oligocene to Early Miocene. Volcanic activity was commonly explosive and of Plinian type. The erupted products range from andesite to rhyolite and formed lava flows, lava domes, volcanic breccias and extensive pyroclastic deposits including flow, air-fall and pyroclastic surge deposits. Volcanic activity along the Southern Mountains Arc culminated in the Early Miocene in a climactic phase of eruptions preserved in the Batu Agung Escarpment, near Yogyakarta. It was during this climactic phase that the Semilir Eruption occurred.

== Eruption product ==
The volcanic deposits are fresh and dip uniformly towards the south at approximately 30 degrees. The sequence is divided into three formations which are, from base to top, the Kebobutak, Semilir and Nglanggran Formations (note that Kebobutak Formation is not a same eruption event with Semilir and Nglanggran). The top part of Kebobutak Formation are intensely bioturbated by a Cruziana-type assemblage. The formation is interpreted to be air-fall deposits reworked in a shallow marine sublittoral setting. Above the Kebobutak Formation lies at least 600 m (2,000 ft) of dacitic pumice, volcanic lithic and crystal-rich tuffs and breccias assigned to the Semilir Formation.

=== Facies of Semilir Formation ===
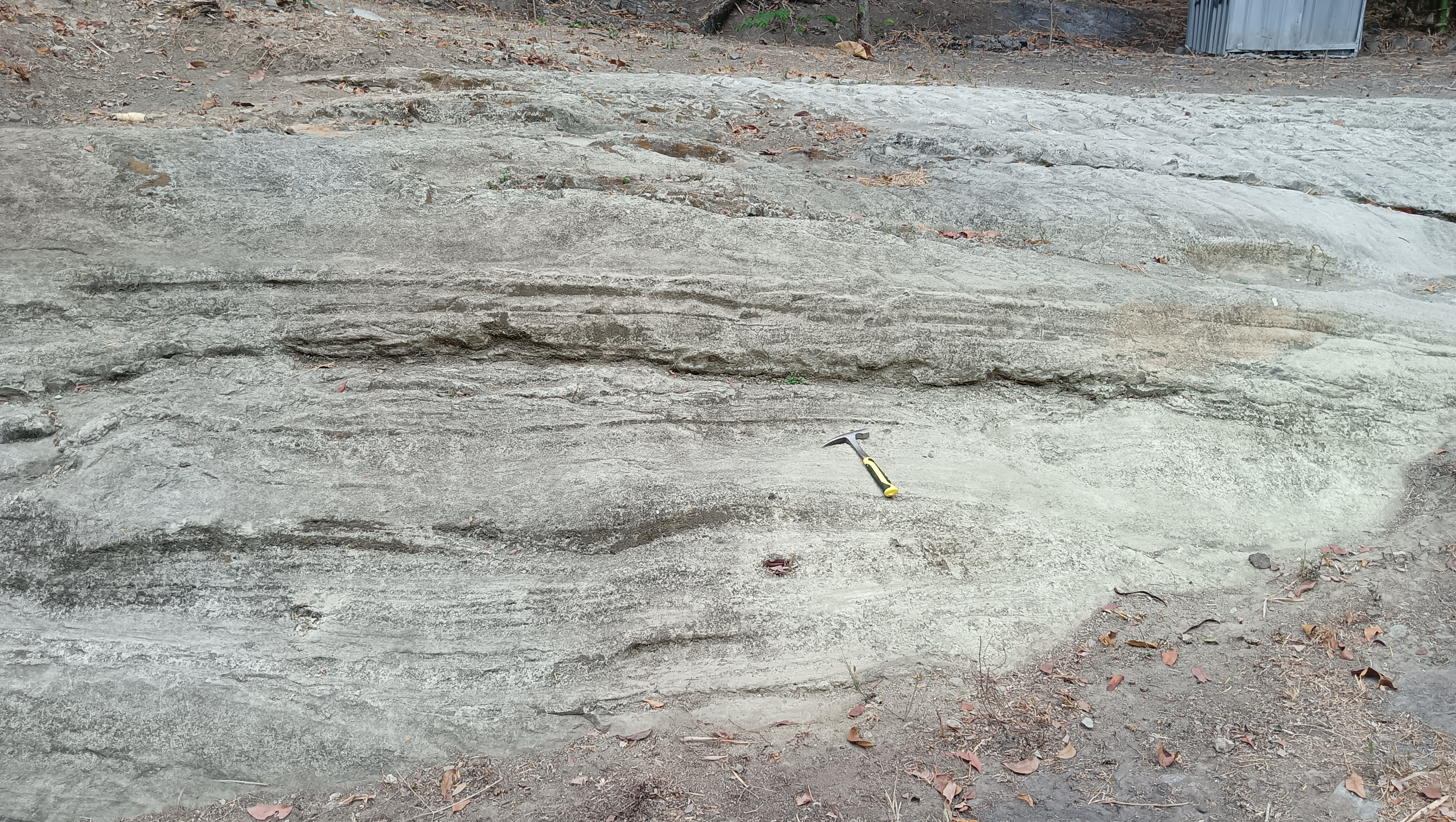
Semilir Formation

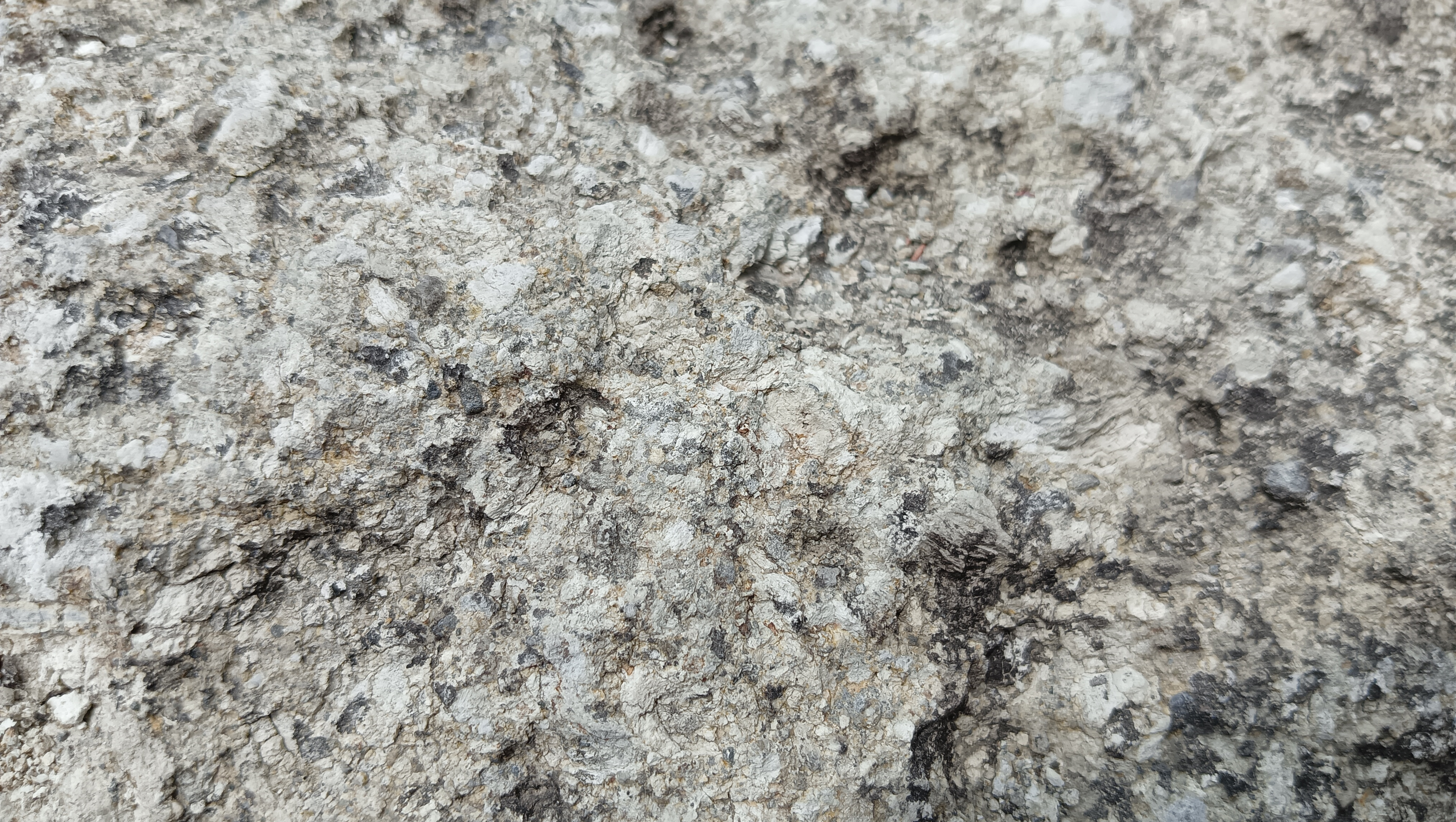
A pyroclastic breccia composed of dacitic pumice and lignite (from decomposed plant material) is exposed in the Semilir Formation.

In East Java the base of the Semilir Formation can be identified by the abrupt termination of bioturbated reworked deposits characteristic of the Kebobutak Formation. The volcanic rocks of the Semilir Formation are characterised by features typical of terrestrial air-fall, pyroclastic surge and flow deposits including dune and antidune structures, crystal layering, well-sorted granular laminations, diffuse bedding, breccias (with metre-scale pumice blocks), thick mantling ashes, and abundant fragments of charcoal. Locally there are water-laid deposits, with scoured irregular bases, flame, traction and suspension structures, and large slump folds indicating an unstable marine slope. Smyth et al. (2011) interpret these observations to indicate the Semilir Formation was erupted in a subaerial setting in which pyroclastic flows travelled across vegetated slopes picking up and baking plant fragments, with some of these flows entering the sea. Some of the primary material would have been redeposited as lahars in distal settings.

=== Facies of Nglanggran Formation ===
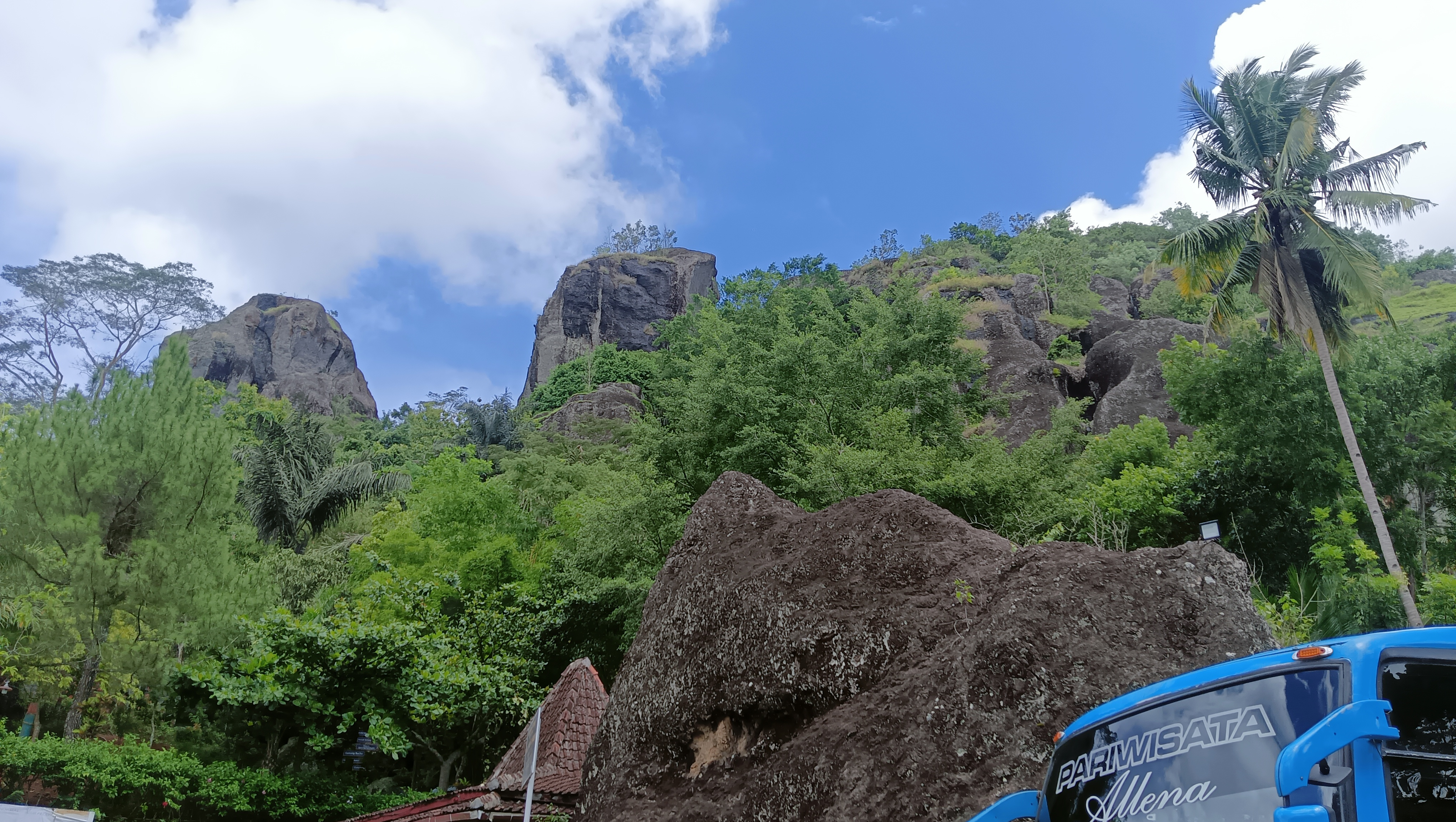
Nglanggran Formation

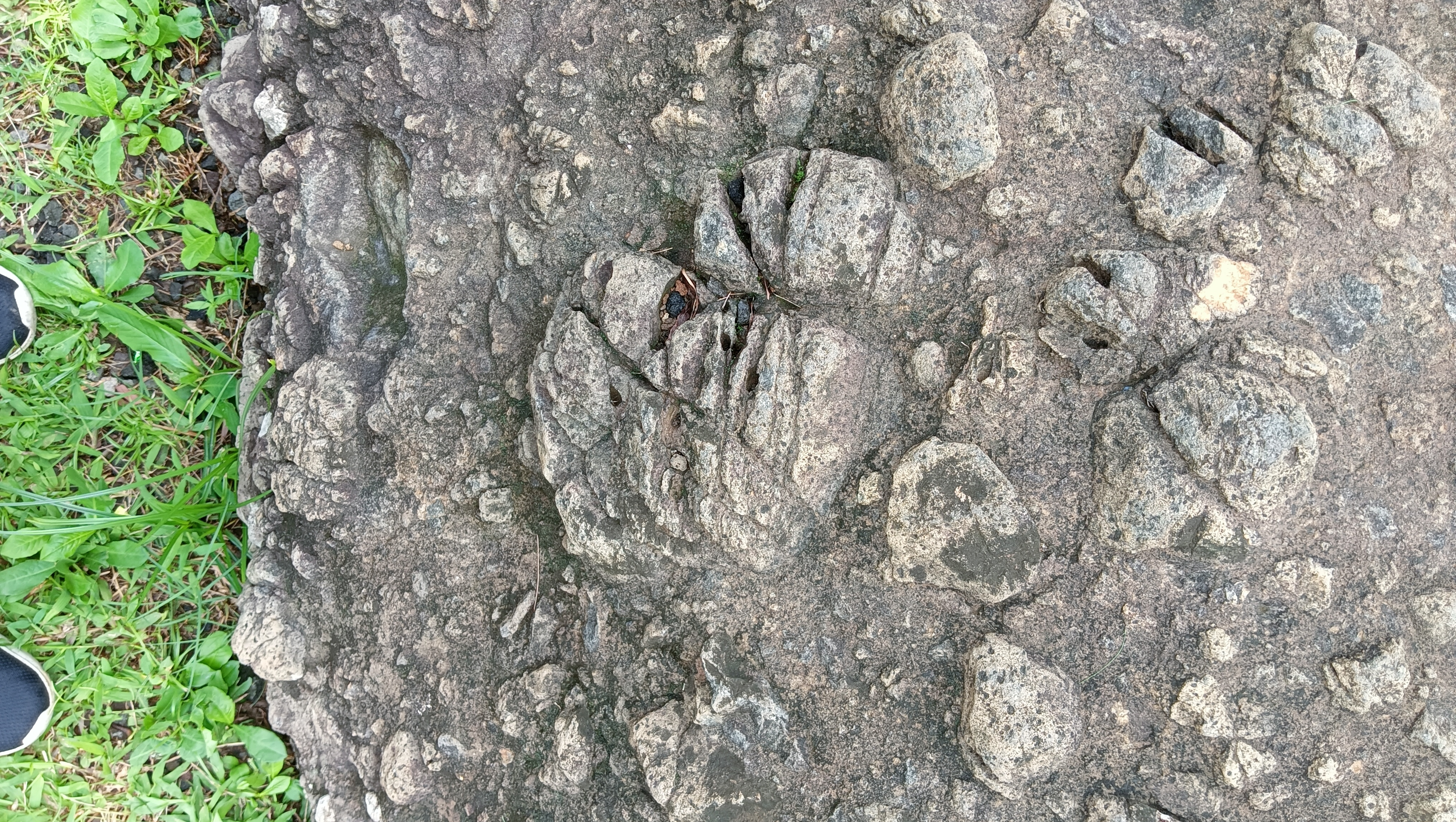
A weathered agglomerate from the Nglanggran Formation exhibiting a bread-crust texture

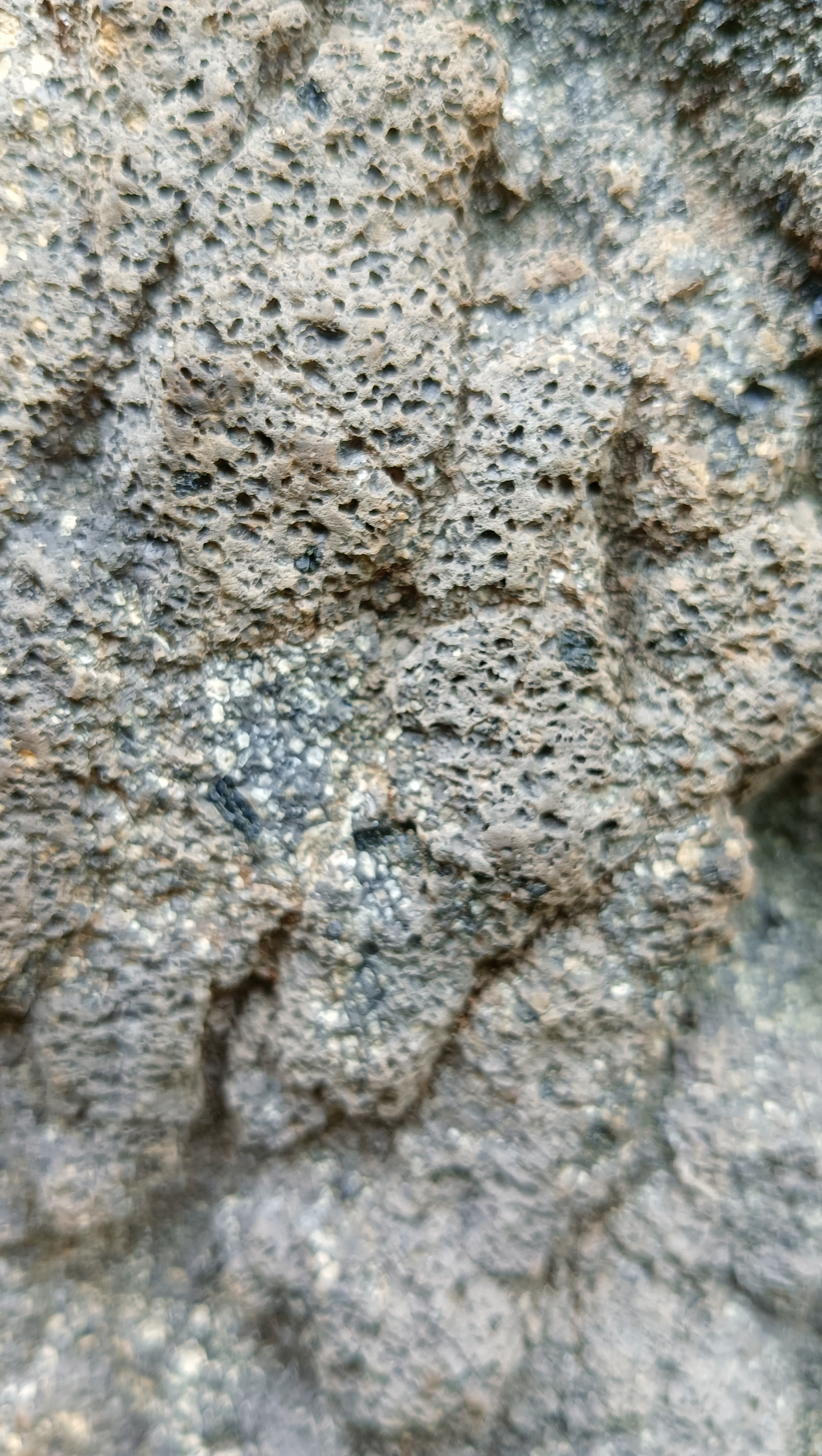
Weathered vesicular andesite of the Nglanggran Formation

Overlying the Semilir Formation is a 200-to-500-metre-thick (660 to 1,640 ft) sequence of massive, resistant, monomict andesitic volcanic breccias, crystal-rich sandstones and minor lava flows of the Nglanggran Formation. The breccia beds are 1 to 10 m (3.3 to 32.8 ft) thick and can be mapped for several kilometres. Interbedded crystal-rich sandstones are much thinner. The breccias are both clast- and matrix-supported with angular fragments commonly 2 to 75 cm (0.79 to 29.53 in) across with some blocks up to 3 m (9.8 ft). Fragment imbrication within the breccias records diverging west and southwest flow from a source in the northeast part of the Batu Agung Escarpment. There is no evidence of any marine influence, and we interpret the Nglanggran Formation as terrestrial deposits formed by sector or repeated dome collapse, marking the end of arc activity in the Southern Mountains. The top and base of the Nglanggran Formation forms topographic breaks in slope, because the andesitic breccias are much more resistant than the underlying and overlying units, and the feature and the formation can be easily mapped across the area over a distance of 46 km (29 mi).

== Thickness and distribution ==
Based on examined exposures, measured sections and published geological maps, the combined thickness of the Semilir and Nglanggran Formations is between 250 and 1,200 m (820 and 3,940 ft), exposed over 800 km^{2} (310 sq mi), and the total volume of volcanic material at least 480 km^{3} (120 cu mi) (DRE). Widely distributed volcanic quartz-rich sandstones of Early Miocene age exposed in East Java that may be Semilir products but have not been precisely dated. One such sandstone is the Jaten Formation, exposed near Pacitan, 80 km (50 mi) east of the Batu Agung Escarpment. The location and character of this formation are described in detail in Smyth et al. (2008). Zircons from the Jaten Formation have a weighted mean SIMS age of 19.6 ± 0.5 Ma and this is consistent with them being reworked products of the Semilir eruption.

== See also ==
- List of large volcanic eruptions
