= Ora Caldera =

Extinct Permian-aged supervolcano in southern Italian Alps

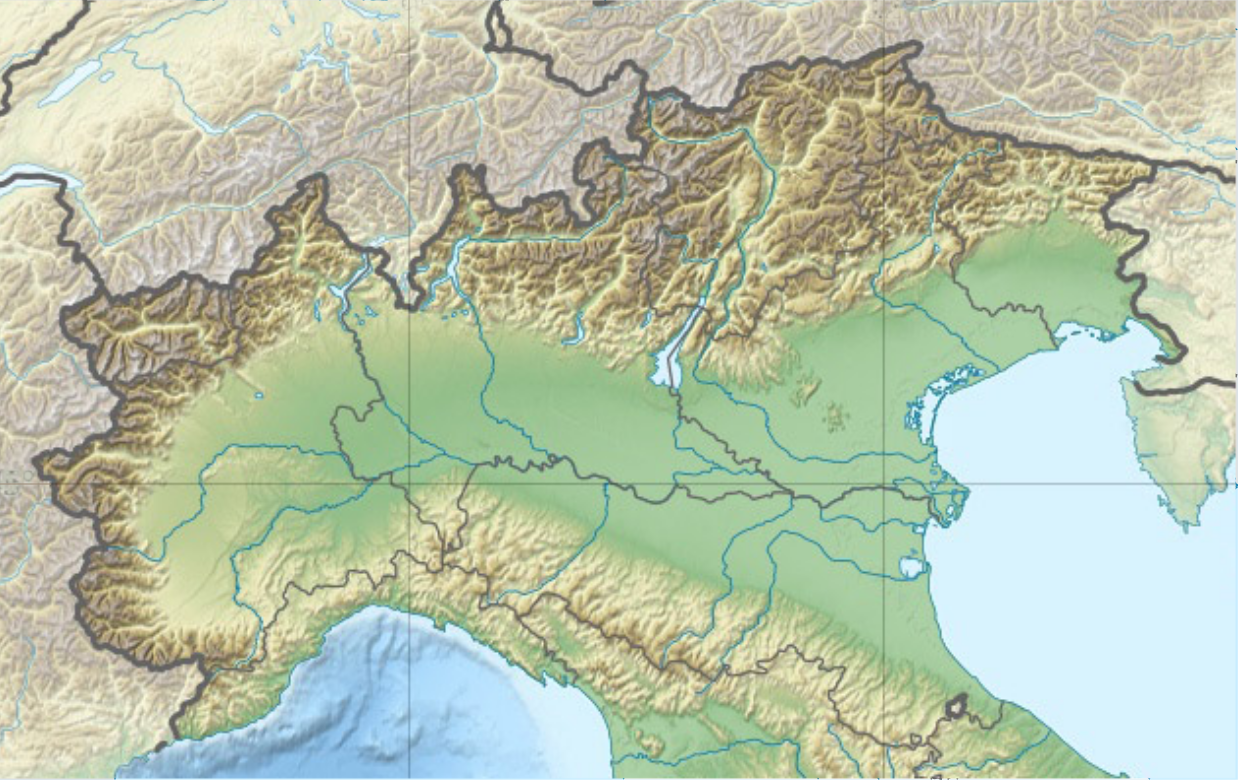
- Location within Northern Italy

Highest point
- Elevation: 234 m (768 ft)
- Coordinates: 46.34687°N 11.29747°E

Dimensions
- Length: 40 km (25 mi)
- Width: 42 km (26 mi)
- Area: 1,680 km^{2} (650 mi^{2})

Geography
- Country: Italy

Geology
- Formed by: Trans-tensional
- Orogeny: Alps
- Rock age: 274 Ma
- Mountain type: Caldera
- Rock type: Rhyolite
- Volcanic belt: Athesian Volcanic Group
- Last eruption: 274 Ma

The Ora Caldera is an extinct Permian supervolcano in the Southern Alps of northern Italy. This 42-kilometre-wide (26 mi) and 40-kilometre-long (25 mi) caldera was formed by a supereruption 277–274 million years ago that produced more than 1,300 km^{3} (310 mi^{3}) of rhyodacitic-rhyolitic ignimbrite. The ignimbrite from this eruption forms the 10-to-1,350-metre-thick (33 to 4,429 ft) Ora Formation, which represents the youngest eruptive unit of the Athesian Volcanic Group.

== Geology ==
Even though Ora erupted between 277 and 274 Ma (also known as The Permian Ora Formation), the preservation of erupted rhyolite is exceptionally good. This is because the southern Alps region has been remarkably stable. This means erosion exposed the Ora formation is largely undeformed and unmetamorphosed, with sub-horizontal dips and essentially no post-emplacement disruption.

=== Eruption ===
The eruptions of the Ora Formation between 277-274 Ma were characterized by crystal-rich (~25 to 55%) and ubiquitously welded. This means the eruption was highly explosive and high volume ignimbrite.

Ora is the youngest eruption of the larger Athesian Volcanic Group (AVG) during the Carboniferous. Volcanism here is tied to the closing of the Paleo-Tethys Ocean, large scale extensional and strike-slip tectonics, and the collapse of the Variscan Orogenic Belt. This belt covers over 2,000 square kilometres (770 mi^{2}) in northern Italy. Pre eruption strata includes two unconformities'. The lowest is made up of a Variscan South-Alpine metamorphic basement, while the upper layer is continental red beds (Val Gardena Sandstone).

Evidence shows the eruption started in the south portion of the caldera and progressed to the north, forming the two different caldera depressions. There is also evidence of multiple magma chambers in the Ora system. This also might show that there were multiple vents erupting at once, incremental caldera filling of subtly compositionally different pyroclastic flow pulses, and an eruption of lower intensity.

=== Volcanic rock characteristics ===
The Andriano Formation is one of the best and most well preserved formations in the Ora complex. It is a massive, rhyolitic lava of red-orange to brick red or red-purple color, with diffuse flow bands of variable thickness (5 to 20 cm). The shape of flow bands range from flat-parallel or slightly wavy to strongly wavy and some flow bands even intersect each other with variable angles.

Volcanic rocks show a porphyric structure with idiomorphic phenocrysts (1-4 mm) of feldspar and quartz that appears to have completely recrystallized under a microscope. It is also crystal-rich, poorly sorted, and has common fiamme and pumice.

== Eruption comparison ==
Below is a comparison of the Ora Caldera eruption to other explosive volcanic eruptions:

Name	Location	VEI	Rock Type	Eruptive Volume (km3)	Eruption Date	Ref
Ora caldera	Italy	8	Rhyolite	1290	~277-274 Ma	
Cottonwood Wash Tuff	Utah (United States)	8	Dacite	2000	31.1 Ma	
Wah Wah Springs Caldera	Utah (United States)	8	Dacite	5900	30 Ma	
Lake Toba	Indonesia	8	Rhyolite	2800	~74,000	
Yellowstone (Huckleberry ridge)	Wyoming (United States)	8	Rhyolite	2450	~2.1 Ma	
La Garita	Colorado (United States)	8	Dacite	3000+	~27.8 Ma	
Mount Tambora	Indonesia	7	Trachyandesite	130	1815 AD	
Lund Caldera	Utah	8	Dacite	4400	29 Ma	
Yellowstone (Lava Creek)	Wyoming (United States)	8	Rhyolite	1000	630,000 BC	
Long Valley Caldera (Bishop Tuff)	California (United States)	7	Rhyolite	650	~764,800 ± 600	
Krakatoa	Indonesia	6	Dacite to Rhyodacite	18-21	1883 AD	
Mount Vesuvius	Italy	5	Tephra, Phonolite	6.4	79 AD	
Mount Saint Helens	Washington (United States)	5	Dacite	2.5	1980 AD	
Lake Taupō	New Zealand	8	Rhyolite	1100	25,500 BC	
Mount Pinatubo	Philippines	6	Dacite	10	1991 AD	
Santorini	Greece	6-7	Dacite	78-86	1610 BC	
Novarupta	Alaska (United States)	6	Rhyolite	17	1912 AD	
Mount Mazama	Oregon (United States)	7	Dacite	176	7700 BC	
Valles Caldera (Bandelier Tuff)	New Mexico (United States)	7	Rhyolite	300	1.2 Ma	
Campi Flegrei	Italy	6	Trachyte, Trachydacite	40	12,800 BC	

== See also ==
- List of volcanoes in Italy
