= Mount Ōkueyama =

Stratovolcano on the island of Kyushu, Japan

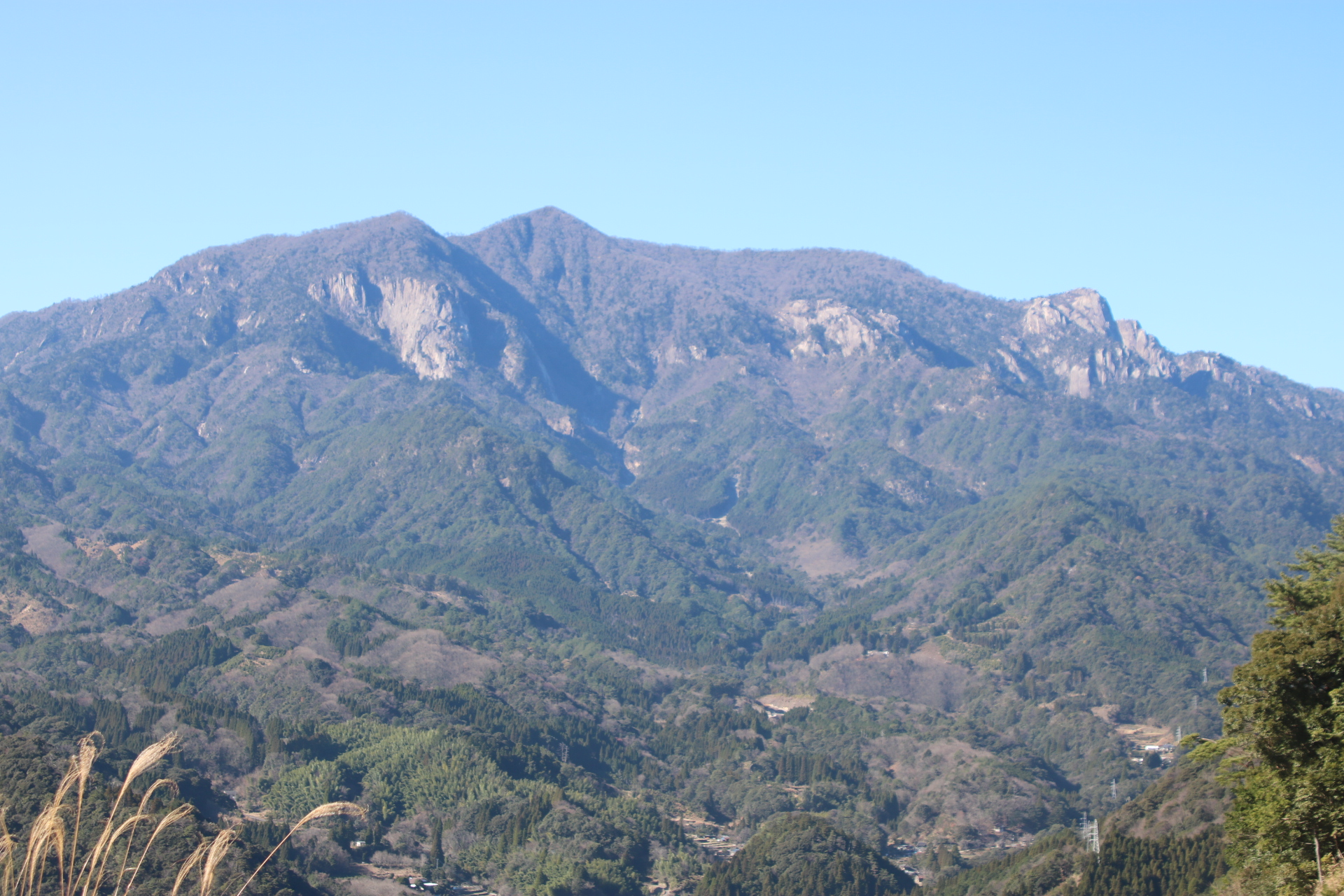

Highest point
- Elevation: 1,643 m (5,390 ft)
- Coordinates: 32°44′16″N 131°30′47″E

Geography
- Location: Kyushu, Japan

Geology
- Mountain type: stratovolcano
- Last eruption: ~13.7 Ma

Mount Ōkueyama (大崩山), also known as Mount Ōkue, is a volcanic mountain on the Japanese island of Kyushu. Part of an ancient volcanic formation known as the Okueyama Volcano-plutonic Complex, Mount Ōkueyama (and possibly several nearby volcanoes) experienced a massive eruption ~13.7 million years before present (13.7 Ma); it has been postulated that this eruption measured 8 on the Volcanic Explosivity Index, making the Ōkueyama eruption larger than any eruption in recorded history. The volcano is now considered to be extinct.

In 1990, the area around the mountain was designated a Forest Ecosystem Reserve, and In 2017 Mount Ōkueyama was declared part of a UNESCO biosphere reserve, the Sobo, Katamuki and Okue Biosphere Reserve.

The area is managed by the Forestry Agency of Japan.

== See also ==
- List of mountains in Japan
- List of volcanoes in Japan
