= Bolshoy Semyachik =

Volcano on the eastern part of the Kamchatka peninsula, Russia

- Location within Kamchatka Krai

Highest point
- Elevation: 1,720 m (5,640 ft)
- Coordinates: 54.32°N 160.02°E

Geography
- Location: Kamchatka, Russia
- Parent range: Eastern Range

Geology
- Mountain type: Stratovolcanoes
- Last eruption: 4450 BCE (?)

Bolshoy Semyachik (Russian: Большой Семячик) is a volcano located in the eastern part of the Kamchatka Peninsula, Russia. It consists of a group of a few stratovolcanoes and lava domes.

== See also ==
- List of volcanoes in Russia
