= Nigorigawa Caldera =

Caldera in Japan

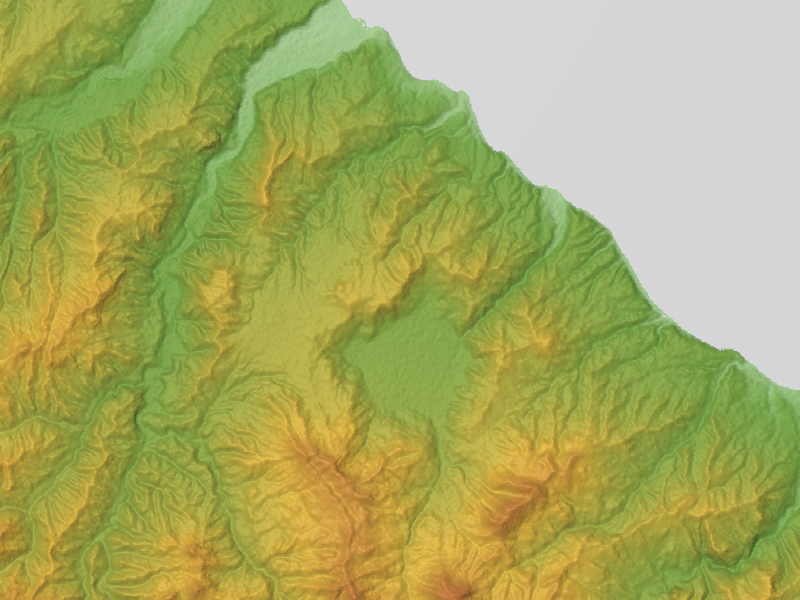
- Nigorigawa Caldera (relief map)

Highest point
- Elevation: 1,168 ft (356 m)
- Coordinates: 42°07′12″N 140°27′00″E

Naming
- Native name: 濁川カルデラ (Japanese)

Geography
- Location within Japan
- Location: Hokkaido Prefecture, Japan

Geology
- Mountain type: Volcanic crater
- Last eruption: 12,000 years ago

Nigorigawa Caldera (Japanese: 濁川カルデラ, Nigorigawa karudera) is a volcanic crater in Oshima, Hokkaido, Japan. It has an elevation of 1,168 ft (356m) and it last erupted 12,000 years ago. The caldera has a diameter of 3km.

A town of the same name is located at the caldera. East of Nigorigawa is the town of Mori and an active volcano known as Koma-ga-take.
