= Akita-Yakeyama =

Small stratovolcano on the island of Honshu, Japan

Akita-Yake-Yama
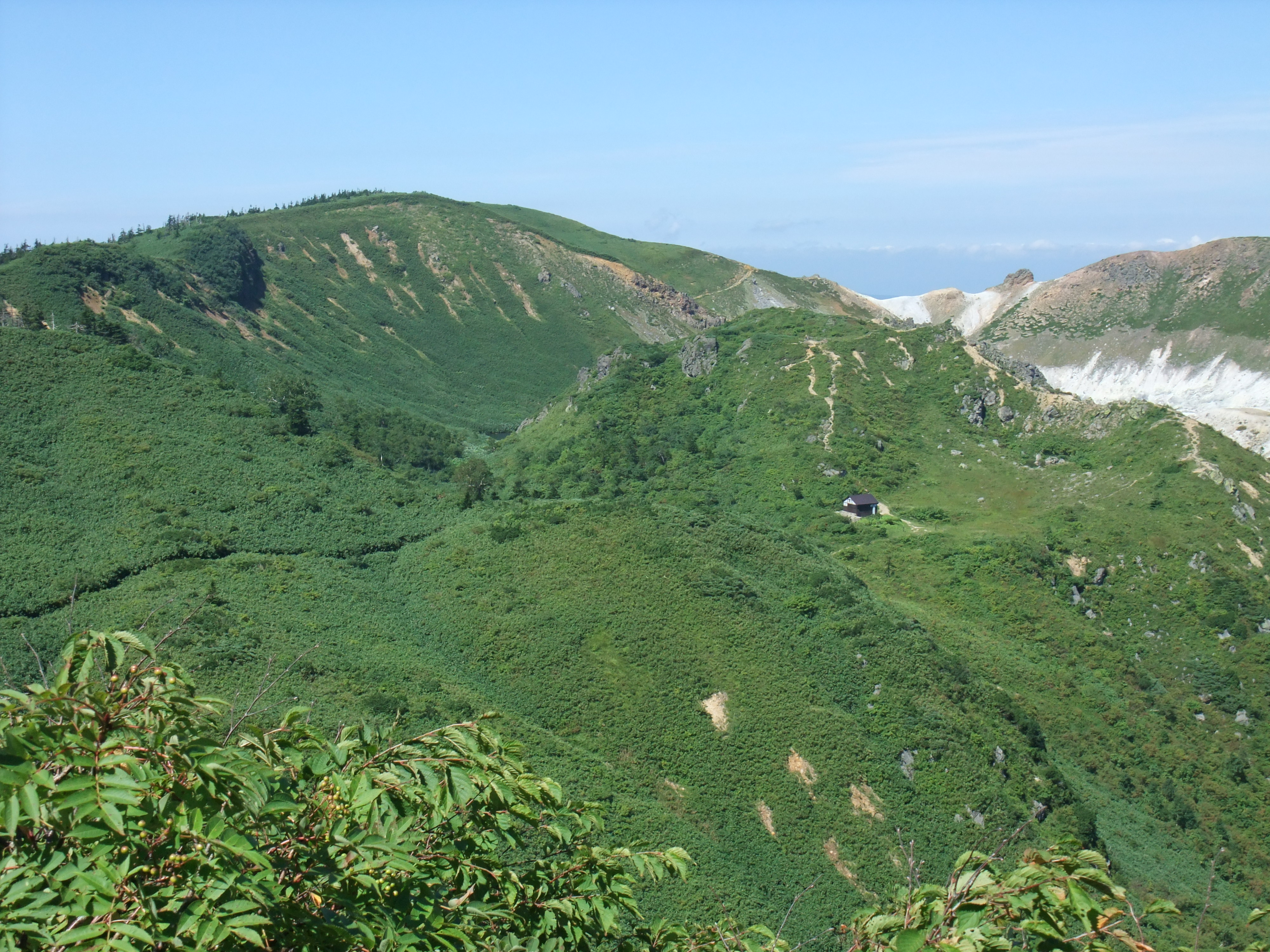
- Mountaintop

Highest point
- Elevation: 1,366 m (4,482 ft)
- Coordinates: 39°57′40″N 140°45′38″E

Naming
- Native name: 秋田焼山 (Japanese)

Geography
- Location within Japan
- Location: Akita Prefecture, Japan

Geology
- Mountain type: Stratovolcano
- Volcanic arc: Northeastern Japan Arc
- Last eruption: August 1997

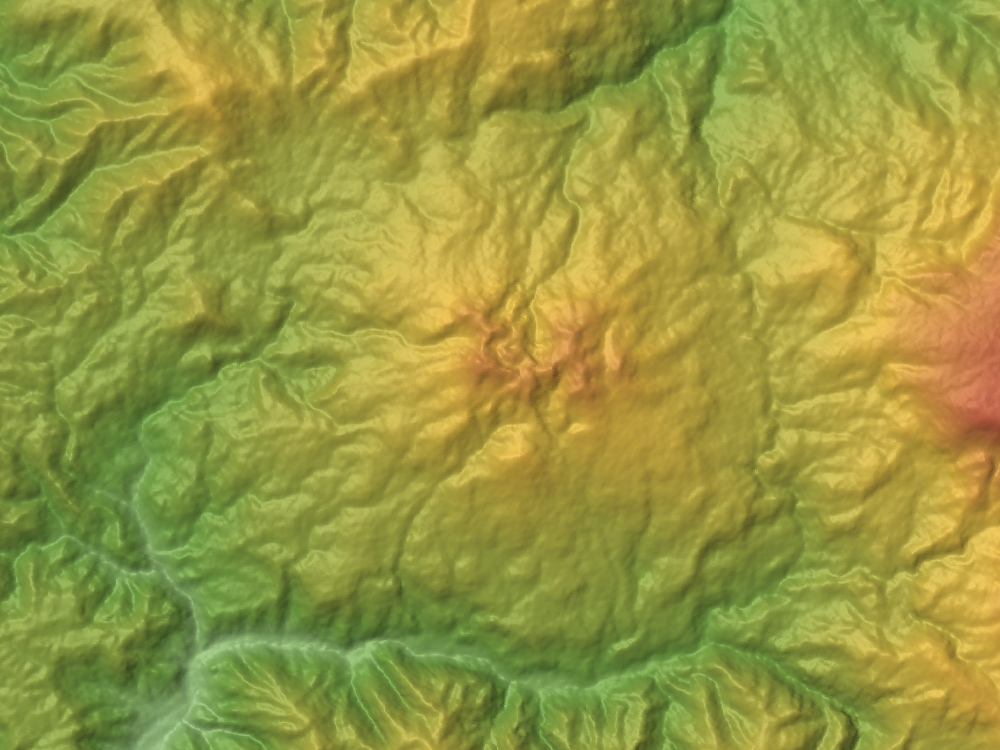
Relief Map

Akita-Yake-Yama is a small stratovolcano in Akita Prefecture, Japan, that is known for its radioactive waters. A small parasitic lava dome is located four kilometers from the volcano.

== Historical eruptions ==
Eruptions during historical times are limited to moderate phreatic eruptions, which have been recorded since 1678.

=== May 1997 eruption ===
On 11 May 1997, after a landslide a few days later, an eruption began. The eruption took place at a hot spring in a resort called Sumikawa-Onsen. On 10 May, tremors were reported at the hot spring up until midnight. On 11 May, a party saw a fast moving landslide moving down the slope of the volcano 20 minutes before the explosion. The eruption started around 08:00 am and was witnessed by a pilot who was flying over the area. He reported that he saw a water and steam ejection, like a giant geyser, followed by an eruption of black smoke. The explosion triggered a mudflow, that travelled down a nearby river valley. The field party then noticed tephra deposits in the mudflow, concluding that they were from the eruption site. The mudflow destroyed two hotels at the foot of the volcano, there were no fatalities.

=== August 1997 eruption ===
On 16 August 1997, a tourist reported that a small eruption had taken place at the Karanuma crater (a crater near the summit). It occurred after a few days of volcanic tremors. The eruption formed a 20 m diameter crater on the SE rim of the Karanuma crater. The eruption lasted for 70 minutes.

== See also ==
- List of volcanoes in Japan
- List of mountains in Japan
