= Mount Osuzu =

Mountain in Kyushu, Japan

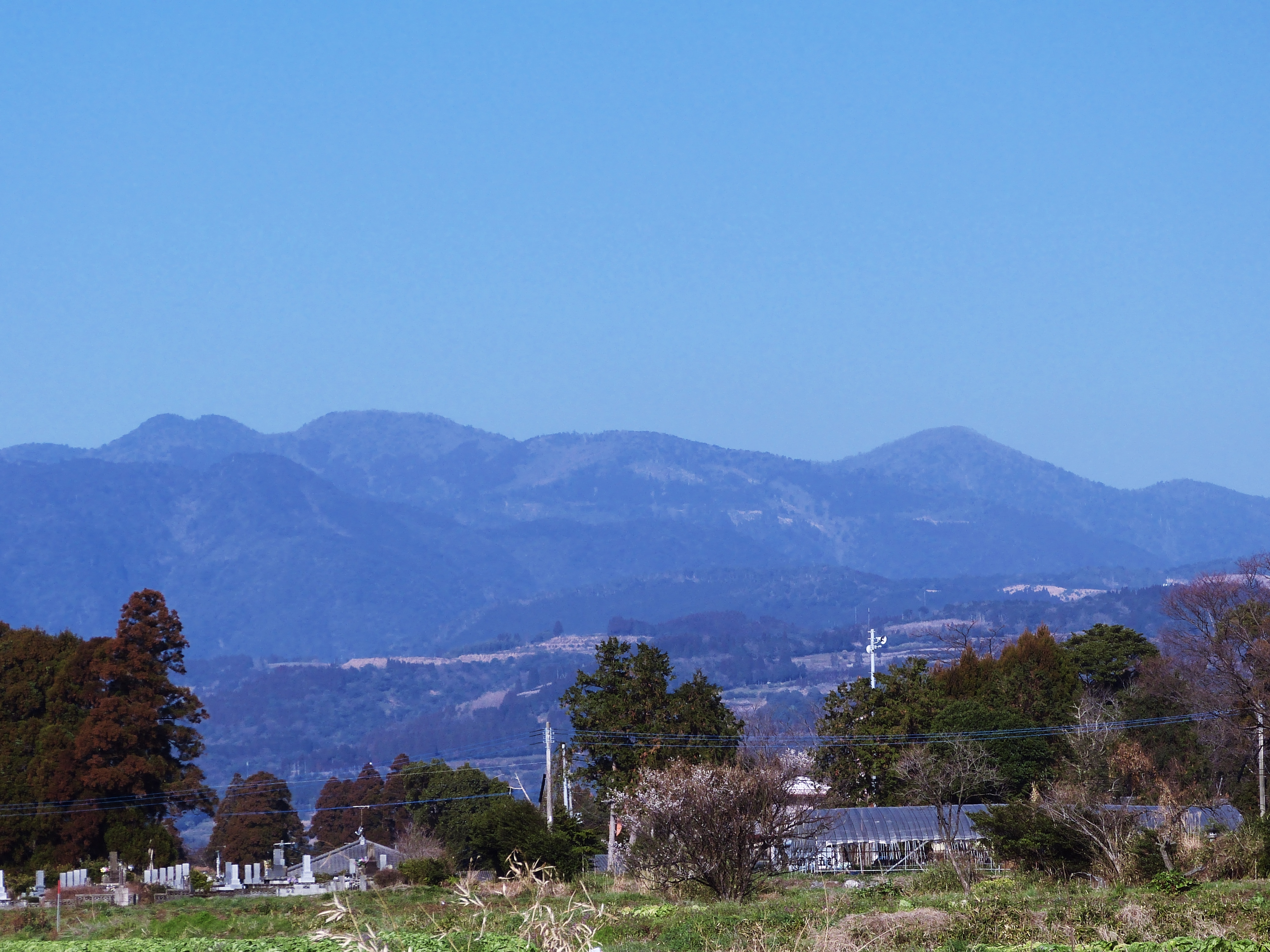

Highest point
- Elevation: 1,405 m (4,610 ft)
- Coordinates: 32°17′57″N 131°25′36″E

Geography
- Location within Japan
- Location: Kyushu, Japan

Mount Osuzu is a mountain on the Japanese island of Kyushu. Part of an ancient volcanic formation known as the Osuzuyama volcano-plutonic complex, the mountain experienced a massive eruption in ~15.1 Ma. The mountain currently falls in the boundaries of Osuzu Prefectural Natural Park.

== See also ==
- List of mountains in Japan
- List of volcanoes in Japan
