= Lava Creek Tuff =

Rock formation in Wyoming, Montana, and Idaho

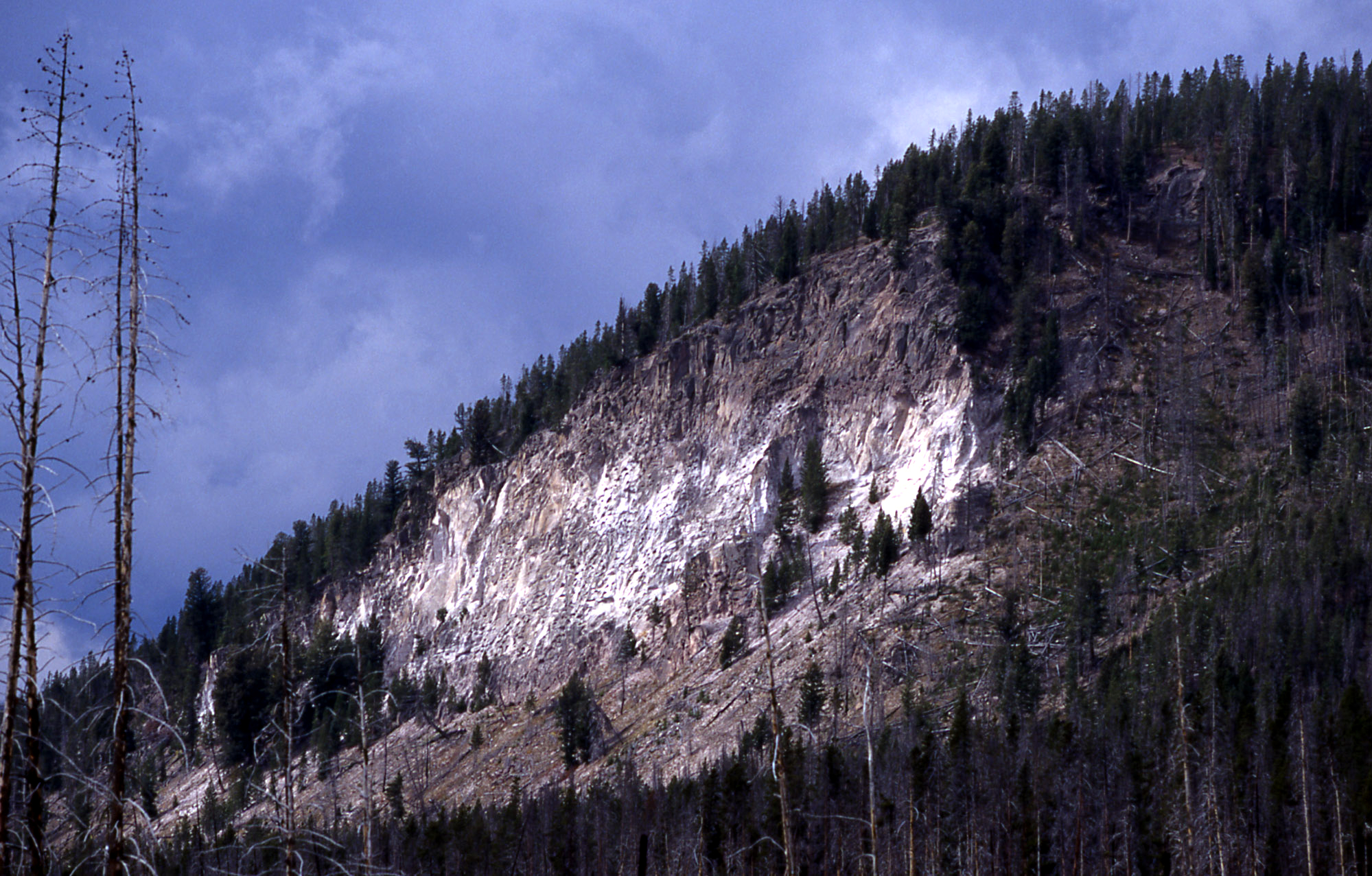
- Tuff Cliff showing the Lava Creek Tuff formation
- Volcano: Yellowstone Caldera
- Date: Around 640,000 years ago
- Type: Ignimbrite-forming
- Location: Wyoming, United States; 44°24′N 110°42′W
- Volume: >1,000 km^{3} (240 cu mi)
- VEI: 8

Maps
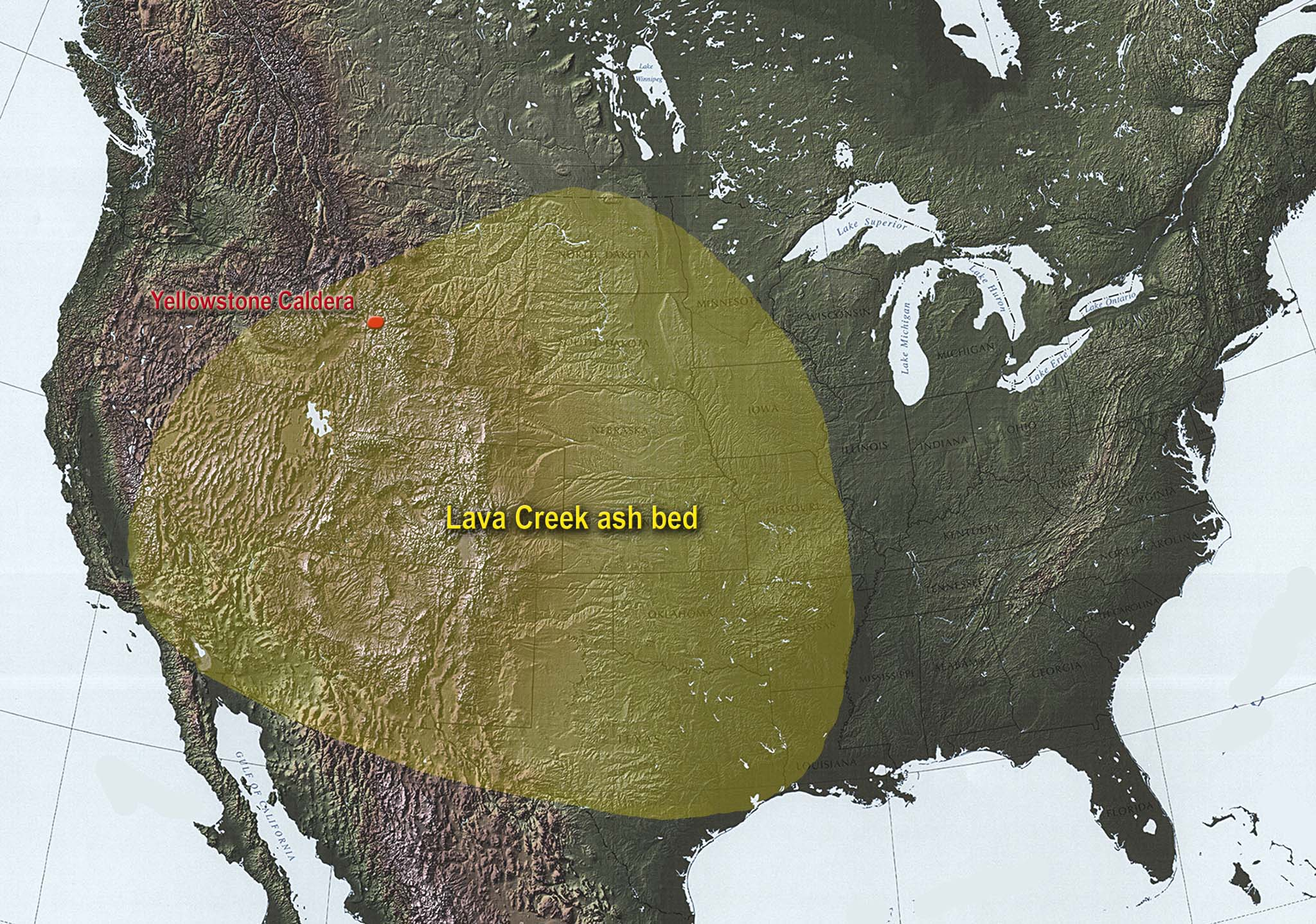
- Extent of the Lava Creek ash bed

The Lava Creek Tuff is a voluminous sheet of ash-flow tuff located in Wyoming, Montana and Idaho, United States. It was created during the Lava Creek eruption around 640,000 years ago, which led to the formation of the Yellowstone Caldera. This eruption is considered the climactic event of Yellowstone's third volcanic cycle. The Lava Creek Tuff covers an area of more than 7,500 km^{2} (2,900 mi^{2}) centered around the caldera and has an estimated magma volume of 1,000 km^{3} (240 cu mi).

The fallout from the eruption blanketed much of North America, depositing as one of the most widespread air-fall pyroclastic layers, formerly known as the Pearlette type O ash bed in the United States and Wascana Creek ash in Canada.

The thick tuff formation resulting from this eruption is well-exposed at various locations within Yellowstone National Park, including Tuff Cliff along the Gibbon River, Virginia Cascade, and along U.S. Highway 20.

Lava Creek Tuff ranges in color from light gray to pale red in some locales. Rock texture of the tuff ranges from fine-grained to aphanitic and is densely welded. The maximum thickness of the tuff layer is approximately 180–200 m (590–660 ft).

== Chronology of tuff ==
Ash flows of the Lava Creek Tuff are divided among six members, informally named unit 1, unit 2, member A, and member B from bottom to top, with units 3 and 4 having unspecified stratigraphic positions. The emplacement of the Lava Creek Tuff was not instantaneous and continuous, but rather, there were multiple pauses, and the members were erupted at different times.

To date the timings of their eruptions, two common methods of radiometric dating are employed: ^{40}Ar/^{39}Ar on sanidine and U–Pb on zircon. The interpretation of the two techniques differs in that zircon crystallization occurs early and progressively during magma evolution; therefore, U–Pb ages must predate the instantaneous age of volcanic eruption as recorded by sanidine.

Two samples from ignimbrite visually closely similar to unit 1 or 2, the oldest ignimbrite units of the Lava Creek Tuff, have ^{40}Ar/^{39}Ar ages of 634.5±6.8 kyr and 630.9±4.1 kyr. ^{40}Ar/^{39}Ar dating experiments on sanidine from member B have yielded eruption ages of 627.0±1.7 kyr, 631.3±4.3 kyr, and 630.9±2.7.

U–Pb dating for zircon crystals from both the member A and B yields an age of 626.5±5.8 kyr, which is indistinguishable from the ^{40}Ar/^{39}Ar date of sanidine. Another team reported U–Pb ages of 626.0±2.6 kyr and 629.2±4.3 kyr for zircon from member A and member B, respectively.

== Petrography ==
The ignimbrite sheet was formed from rhyolite magma and contains phenocrysts of quartz, sanidine, and subordinate sodic plagioclase, along with minor proportions of magnetite, ilmenite, ferroaugite, fayalite, iron-rich hornblende, zircon, chevkinite, and allanite. However, the abundance of phenocrysts differs between the members. Hornblende is relatively abundant in member A but rare in other members. Unit 3 is distinguished from unit 1 and 2 by higher crystal content and more plagioclase. Member A is distinguished from member B primarily by the presence of the mineral amphibole in the former.

The zircon and phenocrysts rims recorded that the magma of the Lava Creek Tuff was generated from a mix of mantle, Archean crust, and shallow hydrothermally altered intra-caldera rocks. Member A and B were sourced from separate magma reservoirs prior to eruption, at a depth range of 3–6 km (1.9–3.7 mi) and a temperature of 790–815 °C (1,454–1,499 °F). The eruption of member B was probably triggered by a combination of an injection of new silicic magma into the reservoir and volatile exsolution from crystallizing magma.

== Eruption ==
The eruption of the Lava Creek Tuff has been reconstructed through geological analysis of the deposits. Proximal ignimbrite units of member A and B have been studied in detail and correlated with distal air-fall. Meanwhile, the newly identified units 1, 2, 3, and 4 are only known at a few locales; nonetheless, they indicate that the Lava Creek eruption was much more complex than previously thought.

=== Unit 1 and 2 ===
These ignimbrite units represent the earliest known eruptive events of the Lava Creek episode.

== See also ==
- Snake River Plain
- Island Park Caldera
- Henry's Fork Caldera
