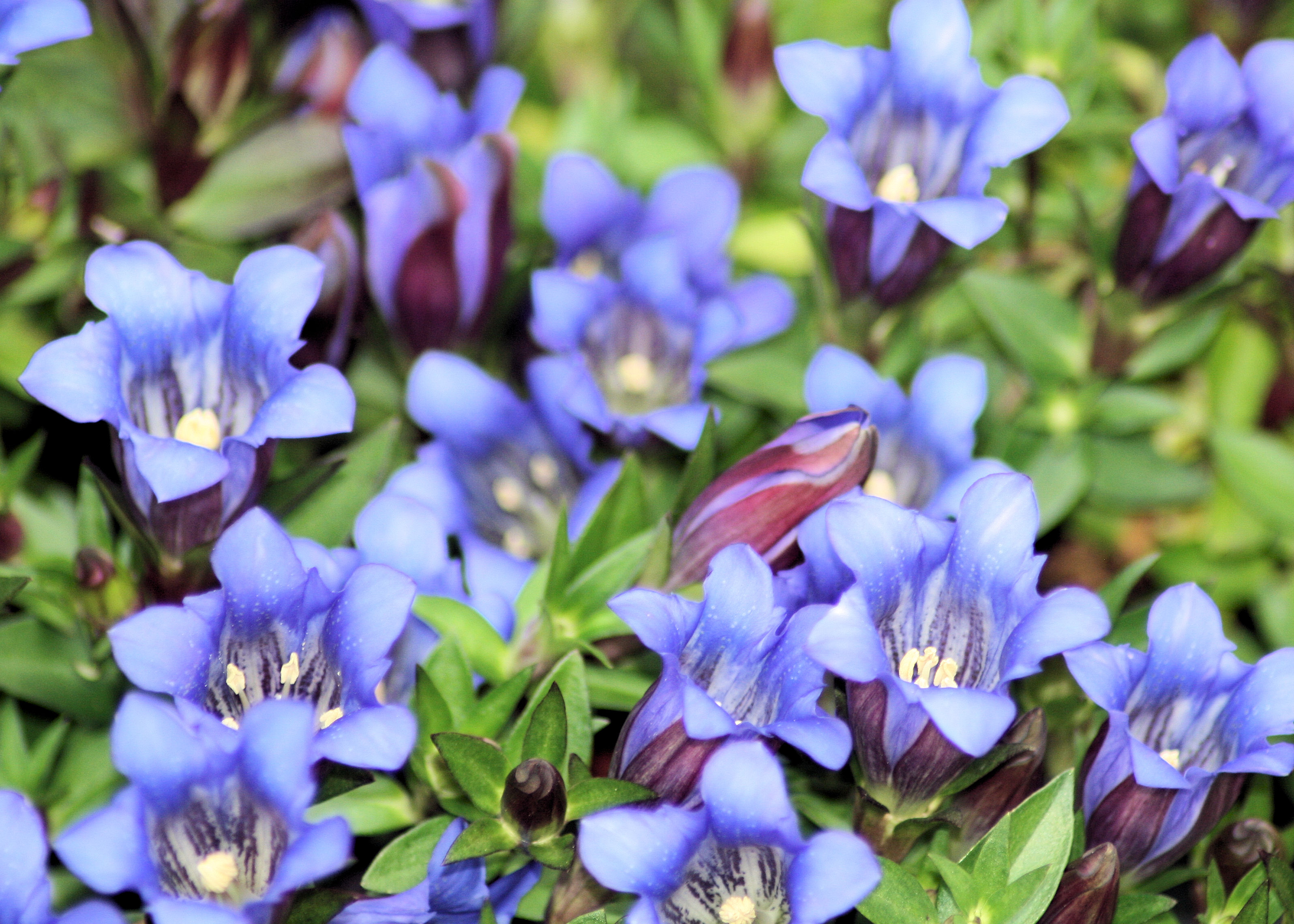

Scientific classification
- Kingdom: Plantae
- Clade: Tracheophytes
- Clade: Angiosperms
- Clade: Eudicots
- Clade: Asterids
- Order: Gentianales
- Family: Gentianaceae
- Genus: Gentiana
- Species: G. scabra

Binomial name
- Gentiana scabra Bunge

= Gentiana scabra =

Species of plant

Gentiana scabra, also known as the Japanese gentian or the Rindō Flower, is a species of flowering plant in the Gentian family (Gentianaceae), found in much of East Asia. The flowers bloom in mid-summer, autumn and are blue or dark blue in color.

== Medicinal use ==
Gentiana scabra roots are used as a bitter tonic in traditional Chinese medicine where it is said to promote digestive secretions and treats a range of illnesses associated with the liver. It is also used in traditional Tibetan medicine.
