= Mount Sobo =

Mountain in Kyushu, Japan

- 祖母山
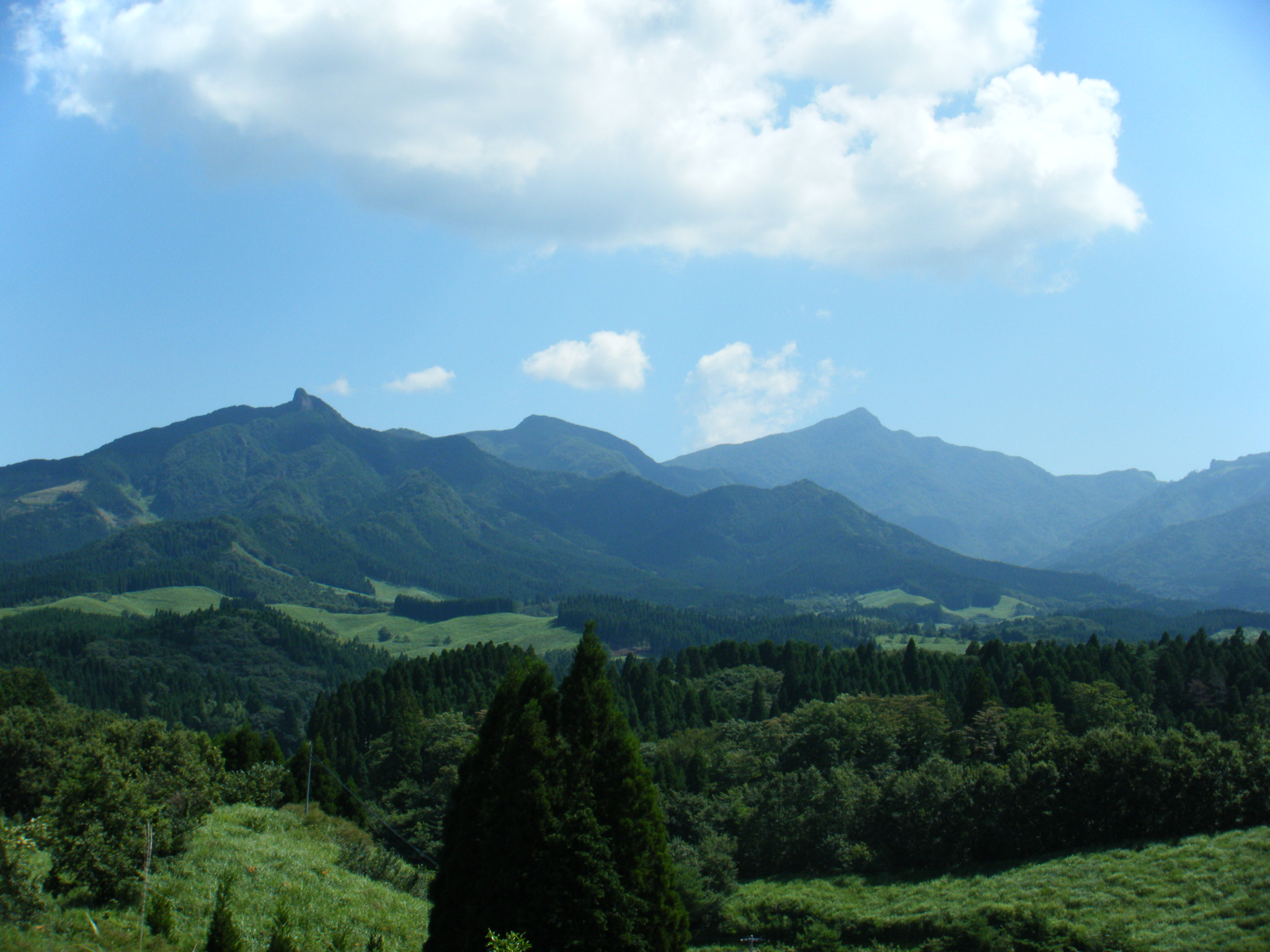
- Mt. Sobo in August

Highest point
- Elevation: 1,756 m (5,761 ft)
- Listing: 100 Famous Japanese Mountains
- Coordinates: 32°49′41″N 131°20′49″E

Naming
- English translation: grandmother mountain
- Language of name: Japanese
- Pronunciation: [sobosaɴ]

Geography
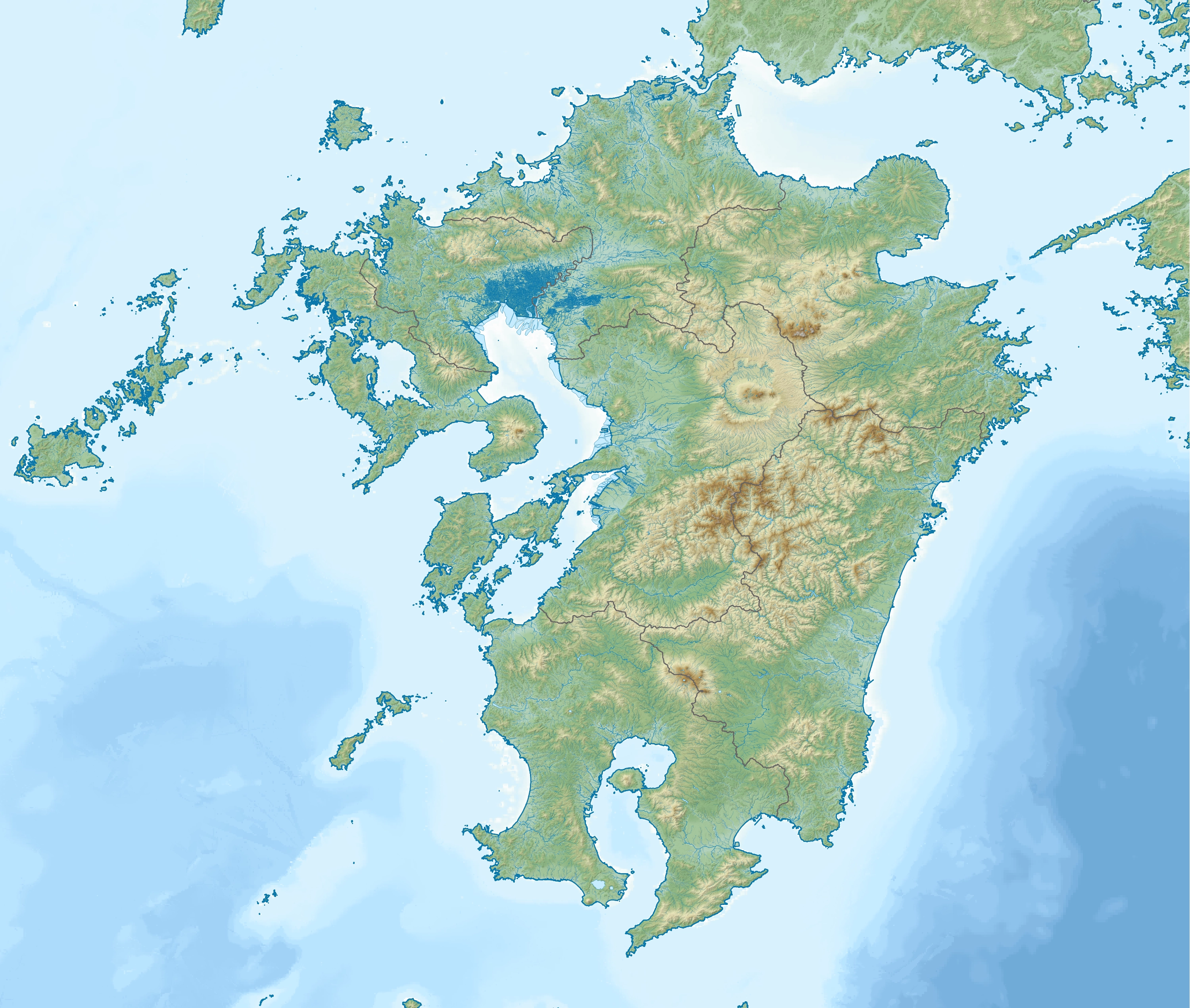
- Location within Kyushu
- Location: Kyūshū, Japan

Climbing
- Easiest route: Hike

Mount Sobo (祖母山, Sobo-san) is one of the 100 Famous Japanese Mountains. The 1,756-metre-high (5,761 ft) mountain lies on the border of Taketa and Bungo-ōno in Ōita Prefecture and Takachiho, Nishiusuki District in Miyazaki Prefecture. It is within the Sobo, Katamuki and Okue Biosphere Reserve. Mount Sobo is the highest peak in Miyazaki Prefecture and in Ōita Prefecture only the 1,791 m (5,876 ft) middle peak of Mount Kujū is higher.

The Sobo Mountain range extends into three prefectures: Ōita, Miyazaki and Kumamoto. Because of the volcanic activity which formed the mountain, huge rocks can be found everywhere around the mountain. There is a great variety of mountain climbing routes, ranging from animal trails to well maintained paths. Courses ae available from relaxed hiking for enjoyment to cliff climbing routes aimed at advanced climbers. Steep rock climbing routes can be seen from all trails in the neighbourhood of the summit. The surroundings of Mount Sobo abound in mineral resources which were mined from the Edo period to the mid-Shōwa period.

== Formation ==
It is believed that the foundation of the Sobo mountain range occurred in two periods of volcanic activity. In the first period, around 13 million years ago, two cauldrons, the Sobo caldera and the Katamuki caldera (傾カルデラ), were formed in an eruption accompanied by pyroclastic flow. The two cauldrons formed at this time, were buried in the second period of volcanic activity leaving the caldera which can be seen today.

About 12.5 million years ago, a cauldron opened up once more. During this time ore was formed. Around 10 million years ago the volcanic activity ceased. Erosion levelled off the mountain until 3 million years ago when the large scale activity of the rising Mount Aso system caused a pyroclastic flow which gave Mount Sobo its present shape.

== Environment ==
Thanks to volcanic activity, granite is ubiquitous. In the valleys at the bottom of the mountain and at medium and high altitude rock-climbing fans are fascinated by the cliffs which can be found everywhere.

Miyama Kirishima (Rhododendron kiusianum), Japanese gentian and the Japanese maple grow in great numbers and are visited by mountain climbers in all seasons.

=== Flora ===
The mountain is covered by old-growth forest. Typical species include Japanese beech and Tsuga. Going up from the lowland, the vegetation changes from evergreen (glossy-leaved) forest over conifer forest halfway up the mountain, to Suzu-take and beech close to the summit. Angelica ubatakensis is only found on parts of Shikoku and in the Sobo mountain range is a precious plant. The pseudonym of Mount Sobo, Mount Uba (姥岳, Uba-take) (uba meaning "elderly woman" in Japanese), goes back to the discoverer of the plant, Tomitaro Makino, who called it that.

=== Fauna ===
It is thought that the southern range limit of the Special Natural monument (特別天然記念物, tokubetsu tennen kinen-butsu), the Japanese serow lies in the mountain range. Even though sightings have been rare in recent years, the Asian black bear is believed to be living here as well. In addition Japanese dormice and sika deer can be seen.

=== Mining ===
At the foot of Mount Sobo lie the remains of the Obira mine. From its opening in 1617 until its closing in 1954, it had been flourishing as the leading Japanese mine. Apart from Obira, there are the Kyūsetsu mine (九折鉱山, kyūsetsu-kōzan) and the Kiura mine (木浦鉱山, kiura-kōzan) on the side of Ōita Prefecture as well as the Mitate mine (見立鉱山, mitate-kōzan) and Toroku mine (土呂久鉱山, toroku-kōzan) on the side of Miyazaki Prefecture. The mines produce scarce minerals like copper, tin, lead, manganese and quartz.

== History ==
On August 30, 1945, a B-29 Superfortress of the United States Air Force on a supply flight crashed in bad weather in the neighbourhood of Mount Oyaji (親父岳, Oyaji-take) located south of Mount Sobo. All twelve crew members died in the incident. Part of the fuselage and the Stars and Stripes still lie among the mountains. A Prayer for Peace monument was erected on August 26, 1995 to commemorate this event.

== See also ==
- 100 Famous Japanese Mountains
