= Muskox intrusion =

Layered volcanic intrusion in Nunavut, Canada

Coordinates: 67°12′30″N 114°53′00″W

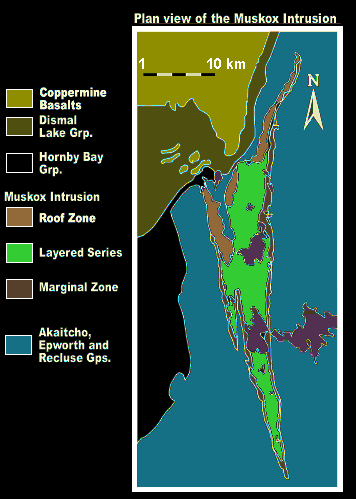
Geologic map of the Muskox intrusion and adjacent geologic groups

The Muskox intrusion is a layered intrusion in Nunavut, Canada. It is located 144 km (89 mi) northeast of Great Bear Lake and 90 km (56 mi) south of Kugluktuk on Coronation Gulf. It was formed during a large magmatic event during the Proterozoic by hotspot or mantle plume volcanism that emplaced the widespread Coppermine River Group flood basalts.

The intrusion is a tilted trough shaped body with an exposed length of 120 km (75 mi) and a thickness or original vertical dimension of over 6 km (3.7 mi). Rock types include picrite, peridotite, dunite, pyroxenite, gabbro and granophyre. A feeder dike of olivine gabbro is exposed "below" the now tilted sequence.

Potassium argon dating in the region provides an age of 1095 - 1155 Ma for the Muskox intrusion, 1100 - 1200 Ma for the Mackenzie dike swarm and 740 - 1200 Ma for the Coppermine basalt flows (younger dates are interpreted as having been reset by later intrusion of gabbro sills at 604 - 718 Ma). Further stratigraphic and structural evidence provides further support that the Muskox, the MacKenzie dikes and the Coppermine flows are of the same magmatic event that formed the Mackenzie Large Igneous Province and the Muskox is interpreted as occupying the magma chamber which fed the volcanism.

== See also ==
- Volcanism of Northern Canada
- Mackenzie hotspot
