= Nauyat Formation =

Geologic formation in Nunavut, Canada

Coordinates: 73°16′N 083°20′W

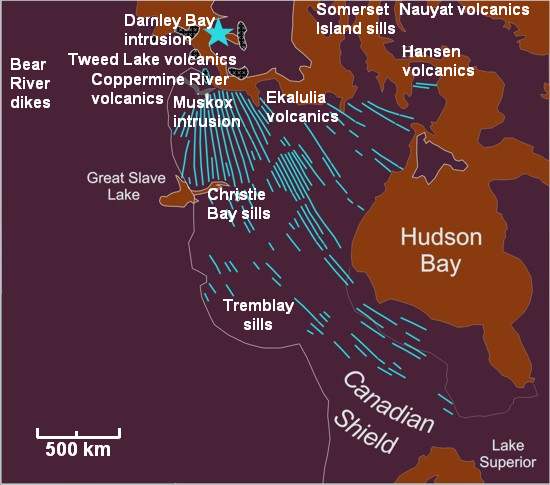
Map of the Mackenzie Large Igneous Province and its sub-features. The Nauyat Formation is shown as "Nauyat volcanics".

The Nauyat Formation is a Neoproterozoic-Mesoproterozoic geologic formation located on northwestern Baffin Island, Nunavut, Canada. It consists of a series of continental flood basalt lava flows of the Mackenzie Large Igneous Province with a thickness of at least 360 m (1,180 ft). These volcanic rocks range in age from 762 to 1,221 million years old.

== See also ==
- Volcanology of Canada
- Volcanology of Eastern Canada
- Volcanology of Northern Canada
- Volcanology of Western Canada
