= Ekalulia Formation =

Geologic formation in Nunavut

Coordinates: 68°26′N 106°45′W

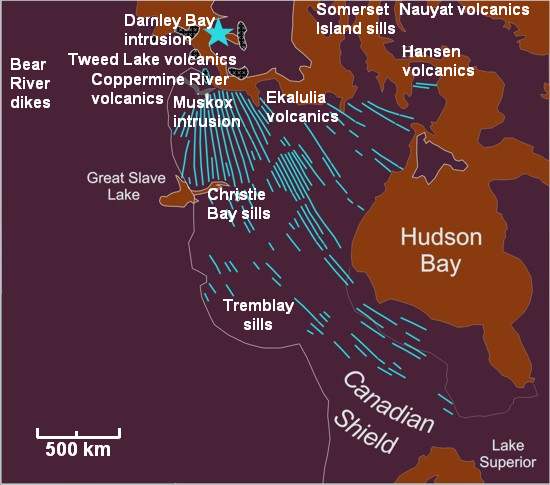
Map of the Mackenzie Large Igneous Province and its sub-features. The Ekalulia Formation is shown as "Ekalulia volcanics".

The Ekalulia Formation is a Neoproterozoic geologic formation found in Nunavut, Canada. It consists of a series of massive continental flood basalt lava flows of the Mackenzie Large Igneous Province with a thickness of 300–500 m. The flood basalts are green, composed of olivine and contain minor pillows.

== See also ==
- Volcanism of Northern Canada
