= Coppermine River Group =

Geologic formation in Northwest Territories and Nunavut, Canada

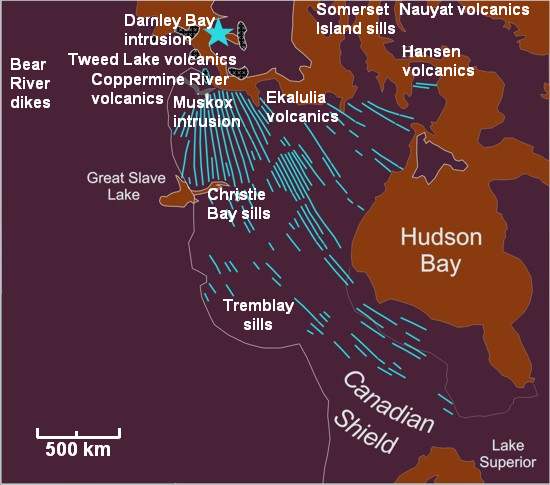
Map of the Mackenzie Large Igneous Province and its sub-features. The Coppermine River Group are shown as "Coppermine River volcanics".

The Coppermine River Group is a sequence of Mesoproterozoic continental flood basalts forming part of the Mackenzie Large Igneous Province in the Northwest Territories and Nunavut, Canada. It is among the largest flood basalt provinces on Earth, covering the area with a volume of approximately 650,000 km^{3} (155,943 cu mi).

== Eruptive history ==
The Coppermine River Group was formed when vast volumes of basaltic lava paved over a large area of the northwestern Canadian Shield about 1,267 million years ago. These basalts form flood basalts that reach thicknesses ranging from 2,000 m (6,562 ft) to 3,500 m (11,483 ft) and consists of about 150 lava flows, each about 10–25 m thick. Except for the lowermost flows, which contain evidence of interaction with water, the entire sequence was erupted subaerially. Eruption of plateau lavas near the Coppermine River, built an extensive volcanic plateau about 1,200 million years ago with an area of about 170,000 km^{2} (65,637 sq mi) representing a volume of lavas of at least 500,000 km^{3} (119,956 cu mi). These flood basalts have been interpreted as contemporaneous with the giant Mackenzie dike swarm and with the Muskox intrusion.

== See also ==
- Natkusiak flood basalts
- Volcanology of Northern Canada
