= Greenstone Flow =

Lava flow in North America

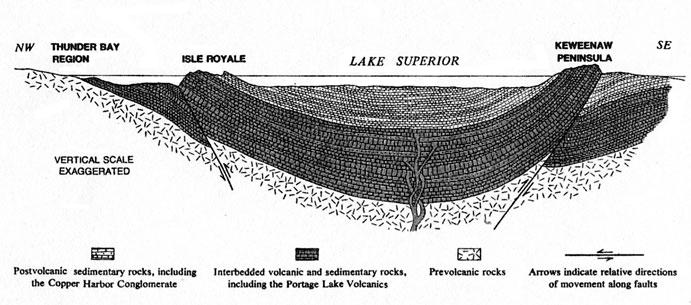
Cross-section of the Lake Superior basin showing the tilted strata of volcanic rock that form Isle Royale. The Greenstone Flow forms the main ridge at Isle Royal.

The Greenstone Flow is one of the world's largest known lava flows, estimated at a volume of around 1,650 to 6,000 cubic kilometers (400 to 1,440 cu mi) of mafic lava. In places, the lava pooled to depth of 487 meters (1,598 ft). The flow was generated by a flood basalt eruption during the formation of the Midcontinental Rift, which occurred 1.1 billion years ago. Where the solidified lava is exposed, it forms much of the Keweenaw Peninsula and Isle Royale in Lake Superior. At Isle Royale, the flow forms the backbone of the island and the Greenstone Ridge trail runs along its length. The flow is the typical source for the semiprecious Isle Royale greenstone.
