= Poseidon Ocean =

Supposed ocean that existed in the Mesoproterozoic period

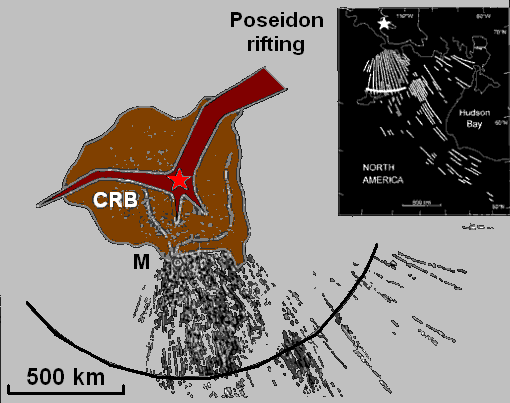
Tectonic and magmatic features associated with the Mackenzie Large Igneous Province, including the rifting that created the Poseidon Ocean. Red star shows the initial Mackenzie plume zone relative to the lithosphere.

The Poseidon Ocean was an ocean that existed during the Mesoproterozoic period (from 1.6 to 1.0 billion years ago) of the geologic timescale. It began to form when a hotspot collided with lithosphere that was already in an extensional regime that allowed rifting to occur at the onset of hotspot volcanism that created the Mackenzie Large Igneous Province. This hotspot, known as the Mackenzie hotspot, produced passive rifting to form a triple junction. As two of the rift arms continued to grow, they created the Poseidon Ocean basin. The third rift arm failed to open fully, creating an aulacogen.
