= Mackenzie Large Igneous Province =

Large igneous province in Canada

Mackenzie Large Igneous Province MLIP
- Large igneous province
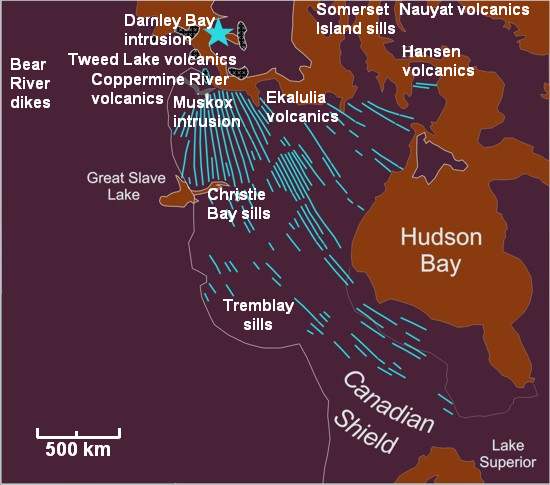
- Map of the Mackenzie Large Igneous Province and its sub-features. Blue star marks the approximate focal point for the 1,270 million year old magmatic activity.
- Location: Northwest Territories, Canada
- Age: Mesoproterozoic

Area
  - Total: 2,700,000 km^{2} (1,000,000 sq mi)

The Mackenzie Large Igneous Province (MLIP) is a major Mesoproterozoic large igneous province of the southwestern, western and northwestern Canadian Shield in Canada. It consists of a group of related igneous rocks that were formed during a massive igneous event starting about 1,270 million years ago. The large igneous province extends from the Arctic in Nunavut to near the Great Lakes in Northwestern Ontario where it meets with the smaller Matachewan dike swarm. Included in the Mackenzie Large Igneous Province are the large Muskox layered intrusion, the Coppermine River flood basalt sequence and the massive northwesterly trending Mackenzie dike swarm.

As a large igneous province, it is an extremely large area of related igneous rocks that were emplaced over an extremely short geological time span. The igneous rocks comprising the Mackenzie Large Igneous Province originated from processes not associated with normal plate tectonics and seafloor spreading. It is one of the several large igneous provinces scattered throughout the Canadian landscape, which can be thousands of kilometres in volume and area. The Mackenzie Large Igneous Province is one of the world's largest Proterozoic magmatic provinces, as well as one of the most well-preserved continental flood basalt terrains on Earth. Igneous rocks of the Mackenzie Large Igneous Province are generally mafic in composition, including basalt and gabbro.

Even though the Mackenzie Large Igneous Province is classified as a large igneous province like other extremely large accumulations of igneous rocks on Earth, it is much larger than large igneous province standards. The standard size classification for large igneous provinces is a minimum areal extent of 100,000 km^{2} (39,000 mi^{2}). However, the Mackenzie dike swarm itself occupies an area of at least 2,700,000 km^{2} (1,000,000 mi^{2}), making the Mackenzie Large Igneous Province larger than the Ontong Java Plateau (in the southwestern Pacific Ocean) and the U.S. state of Alaska.

== Geology ==
=== Origins ===
Like most large igneous provinces, the Mackenzie Large Igneous Province has its origins in a mantle plume—an upwelling zone of abnormally hot rock within the Earth's mantle. As the head of the Mackenzie plume encountered the Earth's lithosphere, it spread out and melted catastrophically to form large volumes of basaltic magma. This resulted in the creation of a stationary volcanic zone west of Victoria Island that experienced considerable volcanism known as the Mackenzie hotspot. Evidence for the Mackenzie hotspot include the existence of the giant mafic Mackenzie dike swarm because of its fanning pattern adjacent to the Muskox intrusion.

The size of the Mackenzie hotspot is considered to have been about 1,000 km (620 miles) in diameter. This calculation is based on the analysis of magmatic fabric in the Mackenzie dike swarm, which shows that magma flow was only vertical close to the middle of the Mackenzie plume and only subhorizontal away from the plume. However, if subhorizontal flow is a result of dike ascent to a level of impartial lightness in the Earth's crust, it would not be related to the size of the Mackenzie plume. Instead, the analysis of dike swarm geometry could possibly maintain evidence for the smallest diameter of the Mackenzie plume. The outer limit separating the zone of fanning dike geometry and subparallel dikes might be suggestive of the smallest diameter for the Mackenzie plume because it is not probable that the stress related to a magmatic zone has consequence over a region that is lesser than the Mackenzie plume, which created the feature. From this analysis, the smallest diameter of the Mackenzie plume would have been about 2,000 km (1,200 mi). Uranium-lead dating of certain Mackenzie dikes from an array of distances from an assigned focal point give an age of 1267 ± 2 million years. This indicates that the Mackenzie hotspot essentially emplaced the Mackenzie Large Igneous Province as a whole throughout the associated landscape. The associated Mackenzie plume is consistent with mantle plumes that have deep origins within the Earth's mantle.

The Mackenzie hotspot is interpreted to have been similar to the early volcanism of the Yellowstone hotspot. Both hotspots produced massive qualities of basaltic lava flows that were identical with the formation of dike swarms during a short period of time at the beginning of mantle plume volcanism. It is estimated that the majority of volcanism that formed the Mackenzie Large Igneous Province took place for no more than two million years, and subsequent volcanism is unknown. However, the younger and smaller Franklin Large Igneous Province just to the northeast is considered to have been formed by a similar mantle plume between 727 and 721 million years ago. The short time span of two million years for magma emplacement in the Mackenzie Large Igneous Province is also present for the Yellowstone hotspot.

=== Extensional forces ===
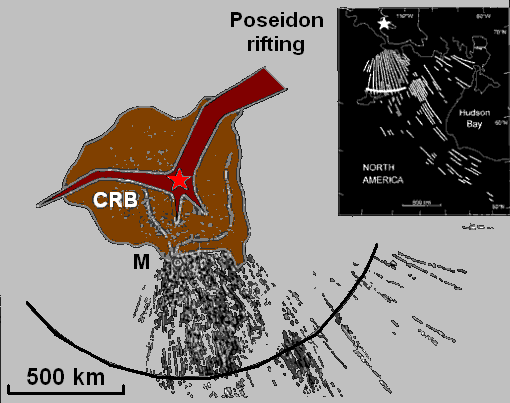
Tectonic and magmatic features associated with the Mackenzie Large Igneous Province. Red star shows the initial Mackenzie plume zone relative to the lithosphere; partial black circle is the estimate of the zone of plume influence on stress-field orientation; dark lines are dikes of the Mackenzie swarm; CRB indicates the Coppermine River basalts; M indicates the Muskox intrusion.

At the beginning of the Mackenzie magmatic event, the Mackenzie hotspot collided with lithosphere that was already in an extensional regime that allowed rifting to occur. Passive rifting has been interpreted as the mechanism that produced the opening of the former Poseidon Ocean, the geometry of which would have been partly controlled by dike swarm geometry. Fahrig (1987) proposed that the Mackenzie plume impact resulted in the emplacement of a triple junction that had a large mafic dike swarm on every rift arm. Two of the first arms formed the Poseidon Ocean basin and the third arm failed thus forming an aulacogen. This tectonic setting suggestion can be comparable with the early volcano-tectonic evolution of the Yellowstone hotspot, which developed two arms instead of three, followed by failure of both arms. At the Mackenzie hotspot, rifting is considered to have been passive and to have taken place in the crust above the hotspot that should have been weakened by the Mackenzie plume. Crustal uplift may have also provided stresses contributing to rifting.

A slightly younger but possibly related geologic feature is the 2,000 km (1,200 mi) long Midcontinent Rift System adjacent to the southern end of the Mackenzie Large Igneous Province. The Lake Superior portion of the Midcontinent Rift System is bounded on the south by pre-existing continental faults that had substantial right-lateral movement before the formation of the Midcontinent Rift System. This period of rifting was a large event for copper mineralization, and the rifting event later deceased when the Grenville orogeny collision occurred.

=== Magmatic history ===
The massive extent of the Mackenzie Large Igneous Province contains a number of magmatic features that were formed during the extensive Mackenzie magmatic event. This includes flood basalts, layered intrusions, sills and dikes, which are widespread throughout the large igneous province. With an area of 2,700,000 km^{2} (1,000,000 mi^{2}), the Mackenzie event is the largest magmatic event ever to occur on the Canadian landscape. At least two magmatic formations can be considered large igneous provinces in their own advantage, both of which cover an area of more than 150,000 km^{2} (58,000 mi^{2}).

==== Placement of the Muskox intrusion ====
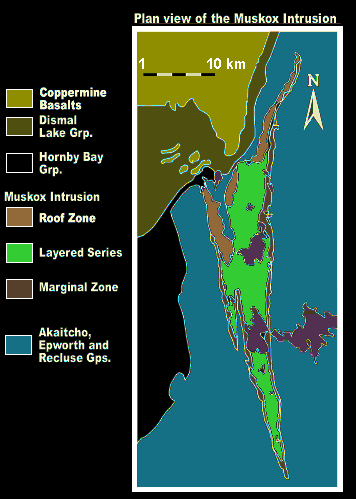
Geologic map of the Muskox intrusion and adjacent geologic groups

Adjacent to McGregor Lake in western Nunavut lies the massive Muskox intrusion. It remains as one of the largest and most studied layered intrusions on Earth, as well as one of the most valuable from an economic perspective. The intrusion represents the oldest igneous formation of the Mackenzie magmatic event, having formed between 1,905 and 1,155 million years ago. It maintains a triangular trough-shaped magma chamber that extends 1.8 km (1.1 mi) below the surface. With a width of 20 km (12 mi) and a length of over 470 km (290 mi), the Muskox intrusion is overlain by a sequence of Coppermine flood basalts that remains 3 km (1.9 mi) thick.

The Muskox intrusion can be separated into three sections, including an olivine gabbro feeder dike to the intrusion, another contact margin zone, and an upper layered series. Because of different levels of erosion and outcroppings of the Muskox intrusion at higher structural levels, north of the Coppermine River the overlying margin zone and layered series covers the feeder dike section. The layering series dips gently north as do the overlying Coppermine flood basalts. Weathering of the Muskox dipping sequence has exposed a cross-section through the entire dipping sequence, starting with the Coppermine flood basalts in the north above the roof of the magma chamber, down through the igneous layering of the Muskox intrusion and into the keel region of the intrusion and its intersection with the olivine gabbro feeder dike that forms the southernmost sector. The margin zone characterizes the western and eastern outer limits of the intrusion.

==== Construction of the Mackenzie dike swarm ====
Widespread throughout the Mackenzie Large Igneous Province is the 2,700,000 km^{2} (1,000,000 mi^{2}) Mackenzie dike swarm. This extensive group of radially oriented dikes is more than 500 km (310 mi) wide and 3,000 km (1,900 mi) long, extending from Northwestern Ontario through northern Manitoba and northern Saskatchewan to Nunavut and the Northwest Territories. The Mackenzie dike swarm was emplaced into older metamorphic and igneous rocks of the Canadian Shield about 1,200 million years ago. Individual dikes of the Mackenzie swarm are respectively 1,500 km (930 mi) to 2,000 km (1,200 mi) long and 30 m (98 ft) thick. This indicates that the Mackenzie dikes are larger than those associated with the Columbia River Basalt Group in the United States, which are respectively 400 km (250 mi) to 500 km (310 mi) long and 10 km (6.2 mi) to 30 km (19 mi) thick. The size differentiation of the Columbia River and Mackenzie dikes suggests that the crude estimates for both dike length and thickness ratio are within the ranges 5-6.7 × 10^{4} for the Mackenzie hotspot and 1.3-5 × 10^{4} for the early stage of the Yellowstone hotspot.

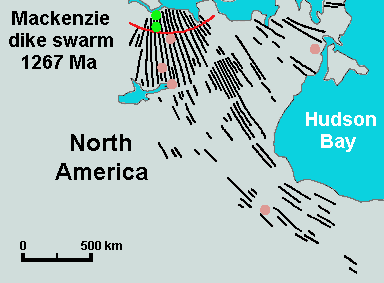
Map of the 1,267 million year old northwest trending Mackenzie dike swarm (black lines). Dots indicate areas where flow direction was determined. Red arcuate line indicates boundary between vertical flow and horizontal flow.

The Mackenzie dike swarm is the largest dike swarm known on Earth and is one of the several dike swarms found throughout the Canadian Shield. Mafic dikes cut Archean and Proterozoic rocks of the Canadian Shield, including those in the Athabasca Basin in Saskatchewan, the Thelon Basin in Nunavut and the Baker Lake Basin in the Northwest Territories. The mafic dikes display evidence that the unmetamorphosed basin-fill sequence was deposited before the Mackenzie dikes were intruded into the associated basins. When the giant Mackenzie dike swarm intruded into the Canadian Shield, it partly uplifted and intruded the Slave craton in the Northwest Territories and Nunavut. This was the last major event to affect the core of the Slave craton, although later on some younger mafic magmatism registered along its boundaries. This includes the magmatic events that formed the 723 million year old Franklin Large Igneous Province and the 780 million year old Hottah gabbro sheets. Since the Mackenzie dike swarm intruded the Slave craton, the craton has been repeatedly submerged under seas.

In northern Yukon, the 1,265 to 1,269 million year old Bear River dikes are interpreted to represent the western extension of the Mackenzie dike swarm. They display geologic similarities with the Mackenzie dike swarm and the Coppermine River flood basalts, and are therefore regarded as products of the Mackenzie plume. The dikes intrude through Early Proterozoic sedimentary strata of the Wernecke Supergroup, some of which exist as separate intrusions while others occur in swarms of up to eight dikes. Individual dikes range from 5 m (16 ft) to 15 m (49 ft) thick and up to 5 km (3.1 mi) long. Medium to fine grained diorite and gabbro comprise the Bear River dikes and are occasionally altered by metamorphism to form greenschist. Apart from two dikes that display differentiation, such as containing weak penetrative foliation of unknown age and origin and being cross-cut by undated hematitic veins, the Bear River dikes are interpreted to have formed during a single magmatic phase.

==== Flood basalts ====
Between 1,200 and 740 million years ago, a series of flood basalt eruptions took place. At the northern portion of the Mackenzie Large Igneous Province, vast volumes of basaltic lava paved over a large area of the northwestern Canadian Shield. This extensive volcanism constructed a large lava plateau with an area of 170,000 km^{2} (66,000 mi^{2}), representing a volume of lavas of at least 500,000 km^{3} (120,000 mi^{3}). This extensive area of flood basalt lava flows has been termed the Coppermine River flood basalts hence given the location of the flood basalt sequence. With an area of 170,000 km^{2} (66,000 mi^{2}) and a volume of 650,000 km^{3} (160,000 mi^{3}), the Coppermine River flood basalt sequence is larger than the Columbia River Basalt Group in the United States and comparable in size to the Deccan Traps in west-central India. This makes the Coppermine River flood basalts one of the largest flood basalt events ever to appear on the North American continent, as well as on Earth. The maximum thickness of the Coppermine River flood basalts is 4.7 km (2.9 mi) and consist of 150 lava flows, each 4 m (13 ft) to 100 m (330 ft) thick.

The Coppermine River flood basalts were extruded shortly after a period of crustal uplift that later resulted in a short period of collapse in the associated landscape. This sudden uplift was likely caused by rising magma of the Mackenzie plume, which later resulted in the appearance of the Mackenzie hotspot. The early Muskox intrusion is considered to have originally been a sill-shaped magma reservoir for the overlying Coppermine River flood basalts during their formation. With the Coppermine River basalts comprising more than 100 individual lava flows, the potential volumes of silicate magma that moved through the Muskox conduit were in the order of 10,000 km^{3} (2,400 mi^{3}).

Further to the northeast, the Nauyat Formation flood basalts on northwestern Baffin Island of Nunavut were erupted on a smaller scale about 900 million years ago. These flood basalts reach a thickness of 360 m (1,180 ft). Just southeast of the Queen Maud Gulf, the Ekalulia Formation flood basalts remain 300 m (980 ft) to 500 m (1,600 ft) thick. They appear green in colour and contain the magnesium iron silicate mineral olivine. Minor pillow lavas also exist in the Ekalulia flood basalts.

=== Mineralization ===
Heavy platinum group elements and copper mineralization exists in the basal margin of the Muskox intrusion. Research operated by Muskox Minerals Corp. proclaims that this extensive layered intrusion has the possibility to evolve into a massive expected source of copper, nickel and platinum group metals. The expected mineralization potential for the Muskox intrusion is supported as a result of its strong similarities to the Noril'sk-Talnakh intrusions in Siberia where the richest orebodies exist on Earth. Because the Muskox intrusion has strong similarities to the Noril'sk-Talnakh area in Siberia, a number of mineral explorations have taken place. The first mineral exploration of the Muskox intrusion occurred during the 1950s when surface prospecting began by the International Nickel Company of Canada, which is now known as Vale Inco. In the 1980s, many small companies with little financing and fragmented claim blocks attended sampling and a number of drilling operations on outcroppings of the Muskox intrusion that contained platinum group elements.

Exposed portions of the feeder dike south of the Coppermine River comprise bodies of large semi-massive and disseminated copper-nickel sulfides rich in platinum group metals. At the margins of the Muskox intrusion, sulfide bearing zones more than 10 km (6.2 mi) long contain palladium, platinum, gold, copper and nickel. This is the location where casual mineral exploration companies searched the Muskox intrusion in the past.

== See also ==
- Timeline of volcanism on Earth
- Volcanology of Eastern Canada
- Volcanology of Northern Canada
- Volcanology of Western Canada
