= Bear River dikes =

The Bear River dikes are a 1,265 to 1,269 million year old group of dikes in northern Yukon, Canada. They represent a feature related to magmatism of the extensive Mackenzie Large Igneous Province and are considered to be the western extension of the northwest–southeast trending Mackenzie dike swarm.
