= Mackenzie dike swarm =

Large igneous province in the western Canadian Shield of Canada

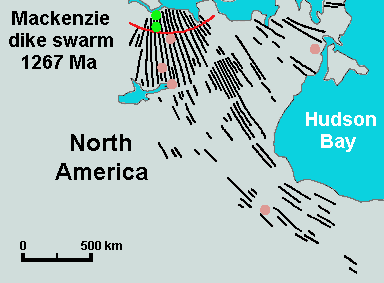
Map of the Mackenzie dike swarm

The Mackenzie dike swarm, also called the Mackenzie dikes, forms a large igneous province in the western Canadian Shield of Canada. It is part of the larger Mackenzie Large Igneous Province and is one of more than three dozen dike swarms in various parts of the Canadian Shield.

The Mackenzie dike swarm is the largest known on Earth. It is more than 500 km (310 mi) wide and 3,000 km (1,900 mi) long, extending in a northwesterly direction across the whole of Canada from the Arctic to the Great Lakes. The mafic dikes cut Archean and Proterozoic rocks, including those in the Athabasca Basin in Saskatchewan, Thelon Basin in Nunavut and the Baker Lake Basin in the Northwest Territories.

The source for the Mackenzie dike swarm is considered to have been a mantle plume center called the Mackenzie hotspot. About 1,268 million years ago, the Slave craton was partly uplifted and intruded by the giant Mackenzie dike swarm. This was the last major event to affect the core of the Slave craton, although later on some younger mafic magmatism registered along its edges.

== See also ==
- Bear River dikes
- Coppermine River Group
