= Mackenzie hotspot =

Former volcanic hotspot

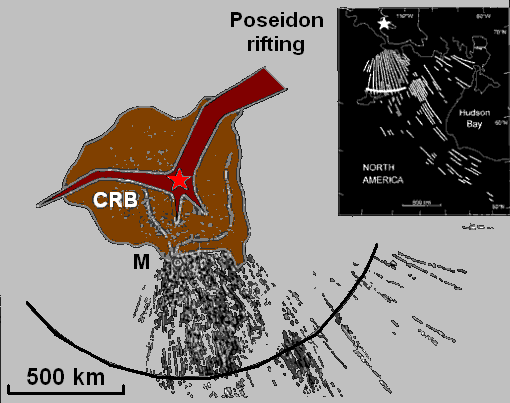
Tectonic and magmatic features associated with the Mackenzie Large Igneous Province, including the rifting that created the Poseidon Ocean. Red star shows the initial Mackenzie plume zone relative to the lithosphere.

The Mackenzie hotspot was a volcanic hotspot that existed about 1.3 billion years ago across Canada from the Northwest Territories and Nunavut. It was centred on what is now Darnley Bay on southwestern Victoria Island.

== Extent ==
The Mackenzie hotspot is responsible for the creation of the Mackenzie Large Igneous Province, which contains the largest dike swarm on Earth. During its formation, eruption of plateau lavas near the Coppermine River, built an extensive volcanic plateau about 1,200 million years ago with an area of about 170,000 km^{2} (66,000 sq mi) representing a volume of lavas of at least 500,000 km^{3} (120,000 cu mi).

The Mackenzie hotspot also resulted in the opening of the Mesoproterozoic Poseidon Ocean.

== See also ==
- Volcanism of Canada
- Volcanism of Northern Canada
