= Supervolcano =

Volcano that has erupted with a volcanic explosivity index of 8

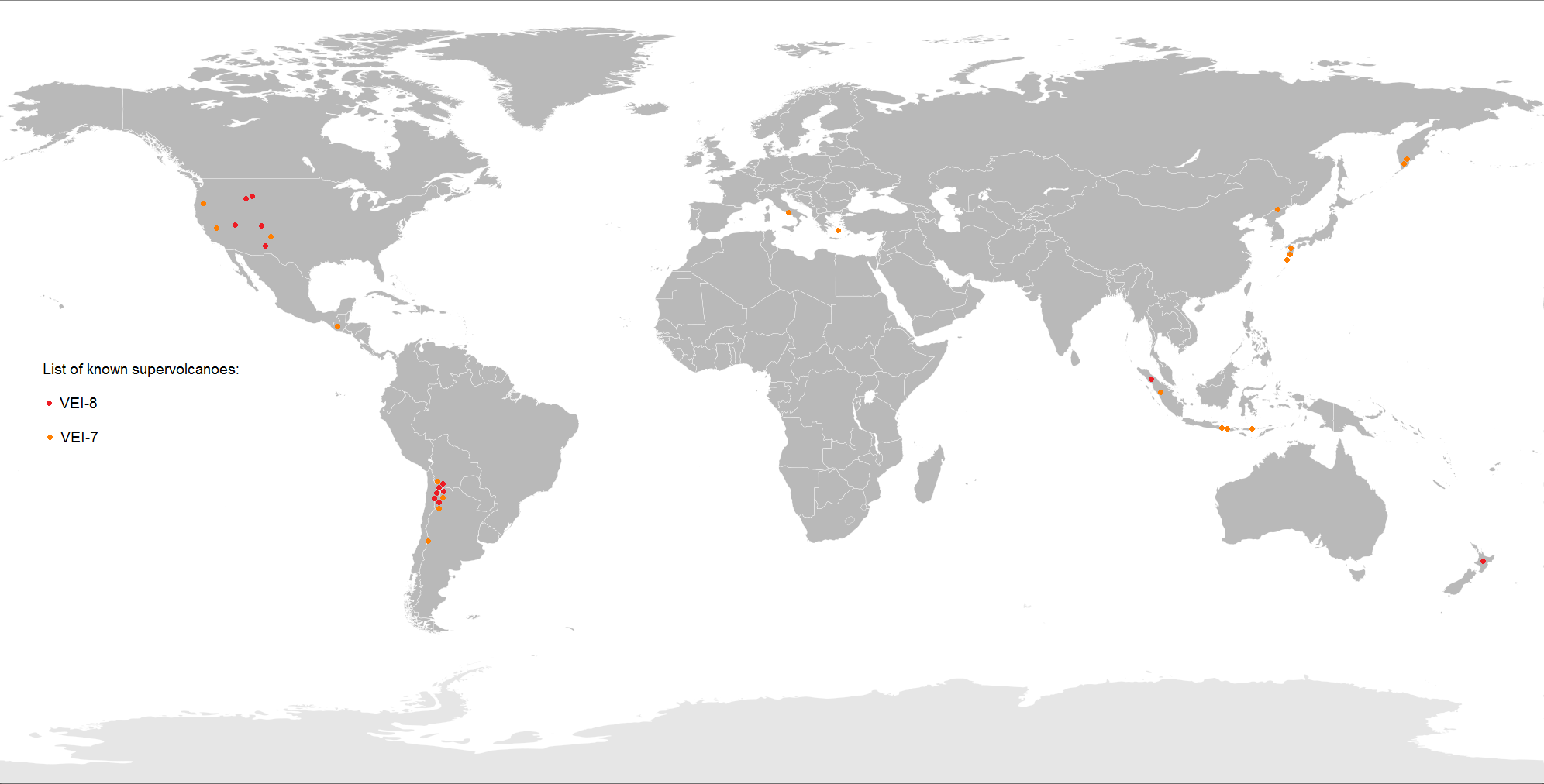
World map of known VEI 7 and VEI 8 volcanoes VEI 8 (supervolcanoes) VEI 7

A supervolcano is a volcano that has had an eruption with a volcanic explosivity index (VEI) of 8, the largest recorded value on the index. This means the volume of deposits for such an eruption is greater than 1,000 cubic kilometers (240 cubic miles).

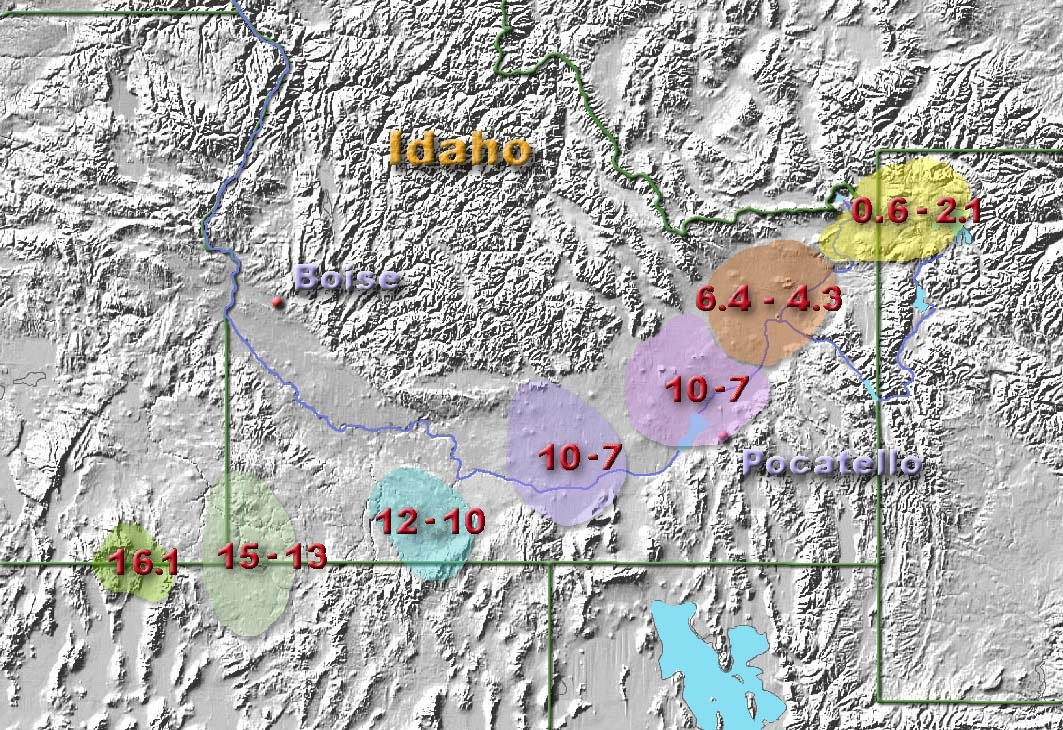
Location of Yellowstone hotspot over time. Numbers indicate millions of years before the present day.

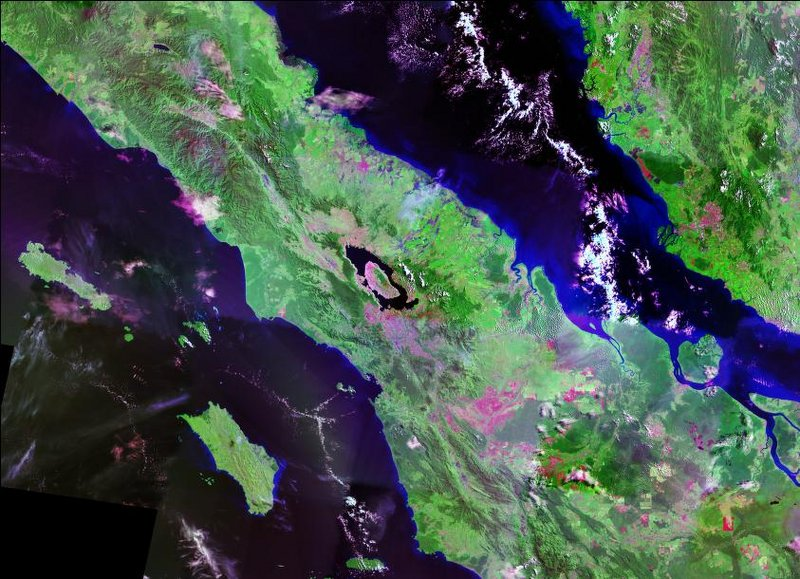
Satellite image of Lake Toba, the site of a VEI 8 eruption c. 75,000 years ago

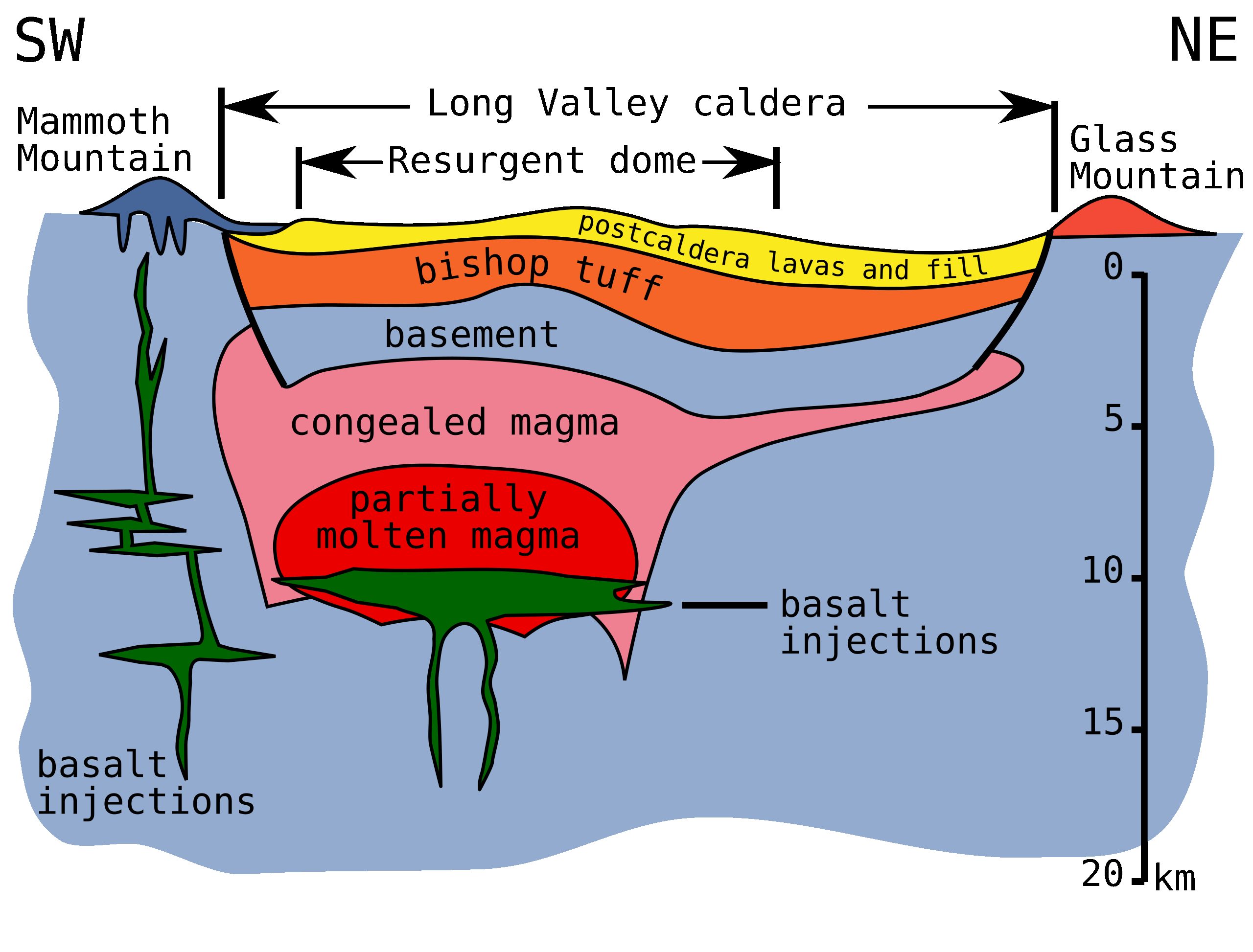
Cross-section through Long Valley Caldera

Supervolcanoes occur when magma in the mantle rises into the crust but is unable to break through it. Pressure builds in a large and growing magma pool until the crust is unable to contain the pressure and ruptures. This can occur at hotspots (for example, Yellowstone Caldera) or at subduction zones (for example, Toba).

Large-volume supervolcanic eruptions are also often associated with large igneous provinces, which can cover huge areas with lava and volcanic ash. These can cause long-lasting climate change (such as the triggering of a small ice age) and threaten species with extinction. The Oruanui eruption of New Zealand's Taupō Volcano (about 25,600 years ago) was the world's most recent VEI-8 eruption.

== Terminology ==
The term "supervolcano" was first used in a volcanic context in 1949. (Note: The term was first used in Conquering the World, a 1925 travelogue by Helen Bridgeman, referring to an Indian Ocean sunset in Indonesia as an upside down "super-volcano".) Its origins lie in an early 20th-century scientific debate about the geological history and features of the Three Sisters volcanic region of Oregon in the United States. In 1925, Edwin T. Hodge suggested that a very large volcano, which he named Mount Multnomah, had existed in that region. (Note: Subsequent research proved that each peak of the Three Sisters was formed independently, and that Mount Multnomah never existed.) He believed that several peaks in the Three Sisters area were remnants of Mount Multnomah after it had been largely destroyed by violent volcanic explosions, similarly to Mount Mazama. In his 1948 book The Ancient Volcanoes of Oregon, volcanologist Howel Williams ignored the possible existence of Mount Multnomah, but in 1949 another volcanologist, F. M. Byers Jr., reviewed the book, and in the review, Byers refers to Mount Multnomah as a "supervolcano".

More than fifty years after Byers' review was published, the term supervolcano was popularised by the BBC popular science television program Horizon in 2000, referring to eruptions that produce extremely large amounts of ejecta.

The term megacaldera is sometimes used for caldera supervolcanoes, such as the Blake River Megacaldera Complex in the Abitibi greenstone belt of Ontario and Quebec, Canada.

Though there is no well-defined minimum explosive size for a "supervolcano", there are at least two types of volcanic eruptions that have been identified as supervolcanoes: large igneous provinces and massive eruptions.

== Large igneous provinces ==
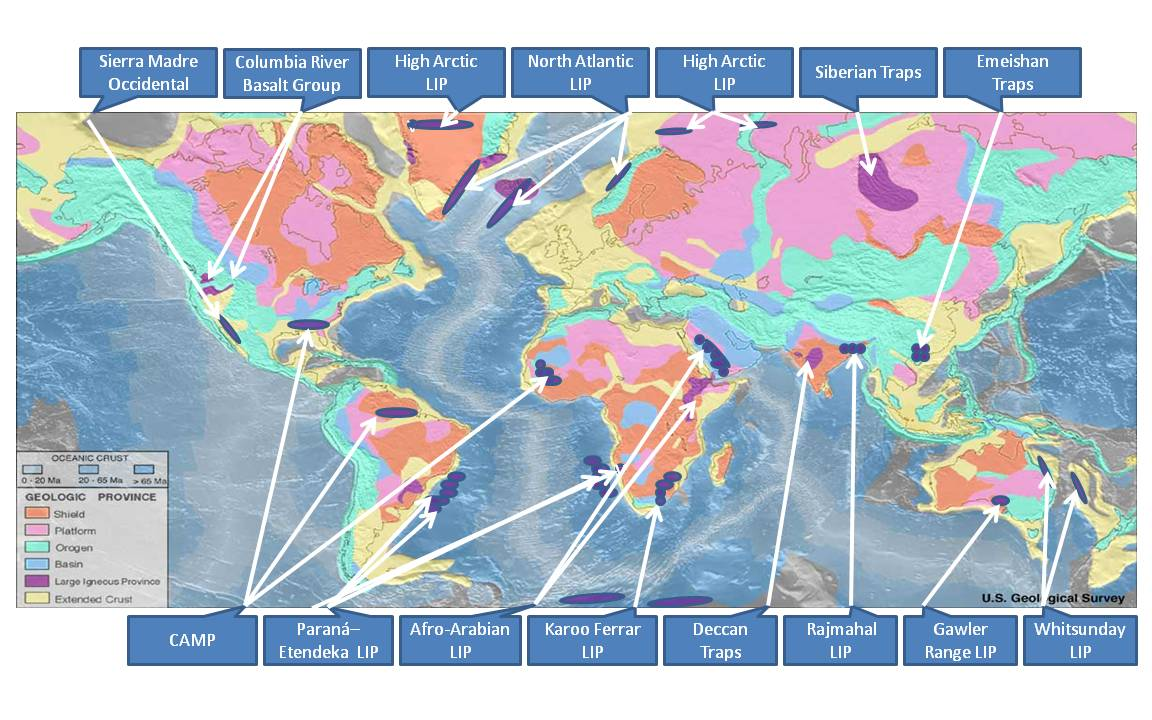
Map of large flood basalt igneous provinces worldwide

Large igneous provinces, such as Iceland, the Siberian Traps, Deccan Traps, and the Ontong Java Plateau, are extensive regions of basalts on a continental scale resulting from flood basalt eruptions. When created, these regions often occupy several thousand square kilometres and have volumes on the order of millions of cubic kilometers. In most cases, the lavas are normally laid down over several million years. They release large amounts of gases.

The Réunion hotspot produced the Deccan Traps about 66 million years ago, coincident with the Cretaceous–Paleogene extinction event. The scientific consensus is that an asteroid impact was the cause of the extinction event, but the volcanic activity may have caused environmental stresses on extant species up to the Cretaceous–Paleogene boundary. Some scientists have hypothesised that the volcanism around the Deccan Traps could have been intensified by the Chicxulub impact, which would have been close to the antipodal point of the Traps at that time.

Additionally, the largest flood basalt event (the Siberian Traps) occurred around 250 million years ago and was coincident with the largest mass extinction in history, the Permian–Triassic extinction event, although it is unknown whether it was solely responsible for the extinction event.

Such outpourings are not explosive, though lava fountains may occur. Many volcanologists consider Iceland to be a large igneous province that is currently being formed. The last major outpouring occurred in 1783–84 from the Laki fissure, which is approximately 40 km (25 mi) long. An estimated 14 km^{3} (3.4 cu mi) of basaltic lava was poured out during the eruption (VEI 4).

The Ontong Java Plateau has an area of about 2,000,000 km^{2} (770,000 sq mi), and the province was at least 50% larger before the Manihiki and Hikurangi Plateaus broke away.

== Massive explosive eruptions ==
Volcanic eruptions are classified using the volcanic explosivity index. It is a logarithmic scale, and an increase of one in VEI number is equivalent to a tenfold increase in volume of erupted material. VEI 7 or VEI 8 eruptions are so powerful that they often form circular calderas rather than cones because the downward withdrawal of magma causes the overlying rock mass to collapse into the empty magma chamber beneath it.

=== Known super eruptions ===
Based on incomplete statistics, at least 60 VEI 8 eruptions have been identified.

Well-known VEI 8 eruptions
| Name | Zone | Location | Notes | Years ago (approx.) | Ejecta bulk volume (approx.) | Reference |
|---|---|---|---|---|---|---|
| Los Chocoyos eruption | Atitlán Caldera, Sololá | Guatemala | | 75,000–98,000 | 1,220 km^{3} | |
| Youngest Toba eruption | Toba Caldera, North Sumatra | Sumatra, Indonesia | Produced 439–631 million tons of sulfuric acid. Largest eruption in the last 25 million years. | 74,000 | 2,800–13,200 km^{3} | |
| Flat Landing Brook Formation | Tetagouche Group | New Brunswick, Canada | Possibly the largest known supereruption. Existence as a single eruption is controversial, and it could have been a multiple 2,000+ km^{3} event that spanned less than a million years | 466,000,000 | 2,000–12,000 km^{3} | |
| Wah Wah Springs Caldera | Indian Peak–Caliente Caldera Complex | Utah, United States | The largest of the Indian Peak-Caliente Caldera Complex eruptions, preserved as the Wah Wah Springs Tuff; includes pyroclastic flows more than 500 meters (1,600 ft) thick | 30,600,000 | 5,500–5,900 km^{3} | |
| La Garita Caldera | San Juan volcanic field | Colorado, United States | Fish Canyon eruption | 27,800,000 | 5,000 km^{3} | |
| Grey's Landing Supereruption | Yellowstone hotspot | United States | Deposited the Grey's Landing Ignimbrite | 8,720,000 | 2,800 km^{3} | |
| La Pacana | Andes Central Volcanic Zone | Chile | Responsible for the Antana Ignimbrite | 4,000,000 | 2,500 km^{3} | |
| Huckleberry Ridge eruption | Yellowstone hotspot | Idaho, United States | Huckleberry Ridge Tuff; consisted of three distinct eruptions separated by years to decades | 2,100,000 | 2,450–2,500 km^{3} | |
| Whakamaru Caldera | Taupō Volcanic Zone | North Island, New Zealand | Whakamaru Ignimbrite/Mount Curl Tephra | 340,000 | 2,000 km^{3} | |
| Heise Volcanic Field | Yellowstone hotspot | Idaho, United States | Kilgore Tuff | 4,500,000 | 1,800 km^{3} | |
| McMullen Supereruption | Yellowstone hotspot | Southern Idaho, United States | McMullen Ignimbrite | 8,990,000 | 1,700 km^{3} | |
| Heise Volcanic Field | Yellowstone hotspot | Idaho, United States | Blacktail Tuff | 6,000,000 | 1,500 km^{3} | |
| Cerro Guacha | Altiplano–Puna volcanic complex | Sur Lípez, Bolivia | Guacha ignimbrite, two smaller eruptions identified | 5,700,000 | 1,300 km^{3} | |
| Mangakino Caldera | Taupō Volcanic Zone | North Island, New Zealand | Kidnappers eruption | 1,080,000 | 1,200 km^{3} | |
| Oruanui eruption | Taupō Volcanic Zone | North Island, New Zealand | Taupō Volcano (Lake Taupō) | 26,500 | 1,170 km^{3} | |
| Galán | Andes Central Volcanic Zone | Catamarca, Argentina | Consisted of three distinct eruptions, separated by 30-40 thousand years | 2,500,000 | 1,050 km^{3} | |
| Lava Creek eruption | Yellowstone hotspot | Idaho, Montana, and Wyoming, United States | Lava Creek Tuff; consisted of two distinct eruptions separated by years | 640,000 | 1,000 km^{3} | |
| Wash Igneous Complex | The Wash | Lincolnshire and Norfolk, United Kingdom | One of the largest recorded eruptions in history, and the only supervolcano located in Europe. | 454,000,000 | Estimated 1,000 km^{3} | |

== Media portrayal ==
- Nova featured an episode "Mystery of the Megavolcano" in September 2006 examining such eruptions in the last 100,000 years.
- Supervolcano is the title of a British-Canadian television disaster film, first released in 2005. It tells a fictional story of a supereruption at Yellowstone.
- In the 2009 disaster film 2012, a supereruption of Yellowstone is one of the events that contributes to a global cataclysm.
- The 2025 political thriller Paradise takes place after an eruption of a fictional Antarctic supervolcano and subsequent megatsunami, causing the United States federal government and other prominent individuals to relocate to an underground city in Colorado.

== Gallery ==
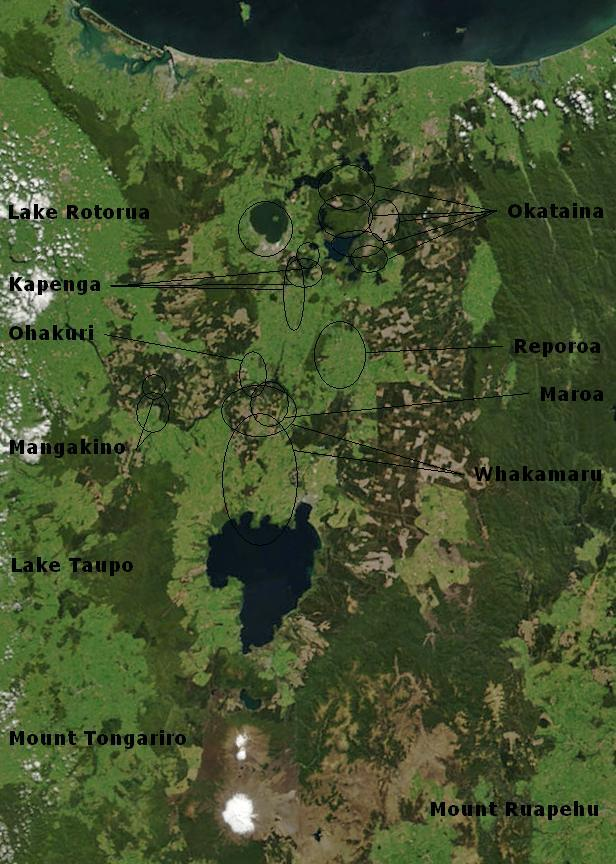
Volcano, lake, and caldera locations in the Taupō Volcanic Zone

== See also ==
- Global catastrophic risk – Hypothetical global-scale disaster risk
- Timeline of volcanism on Earth
- Toba catastrophe theory – Volcanic supereruption 74,000 years ago in Indonesia
- Volcanic winter – Temperature anomaly event caused by a volcanic eruption
