= Eugene Glacier =

Glacier in Oregon, United States

- Location within Oregon
- Type: Mountain glacier
- Location: Cascade Range, Lane County, Oregon, U.S.
- Coordinates: 44°06′37″N 121°46′50″W
- Length: 1,000 ft (300 m)
- Terminus: Barren rock/Talus
- Status: Retreating

Eugene Glacier is located in the US state of Oregon. The glacier is situated in the Cascade Range at an elevation generally above 9,000 feet (2,700 m) and is east of Lost Creek Glacier. Eugene Glacier is on the northwest slopes of South Sister, a dormant stratovolcano.

== See also ==
- List of glaciers in the United States
