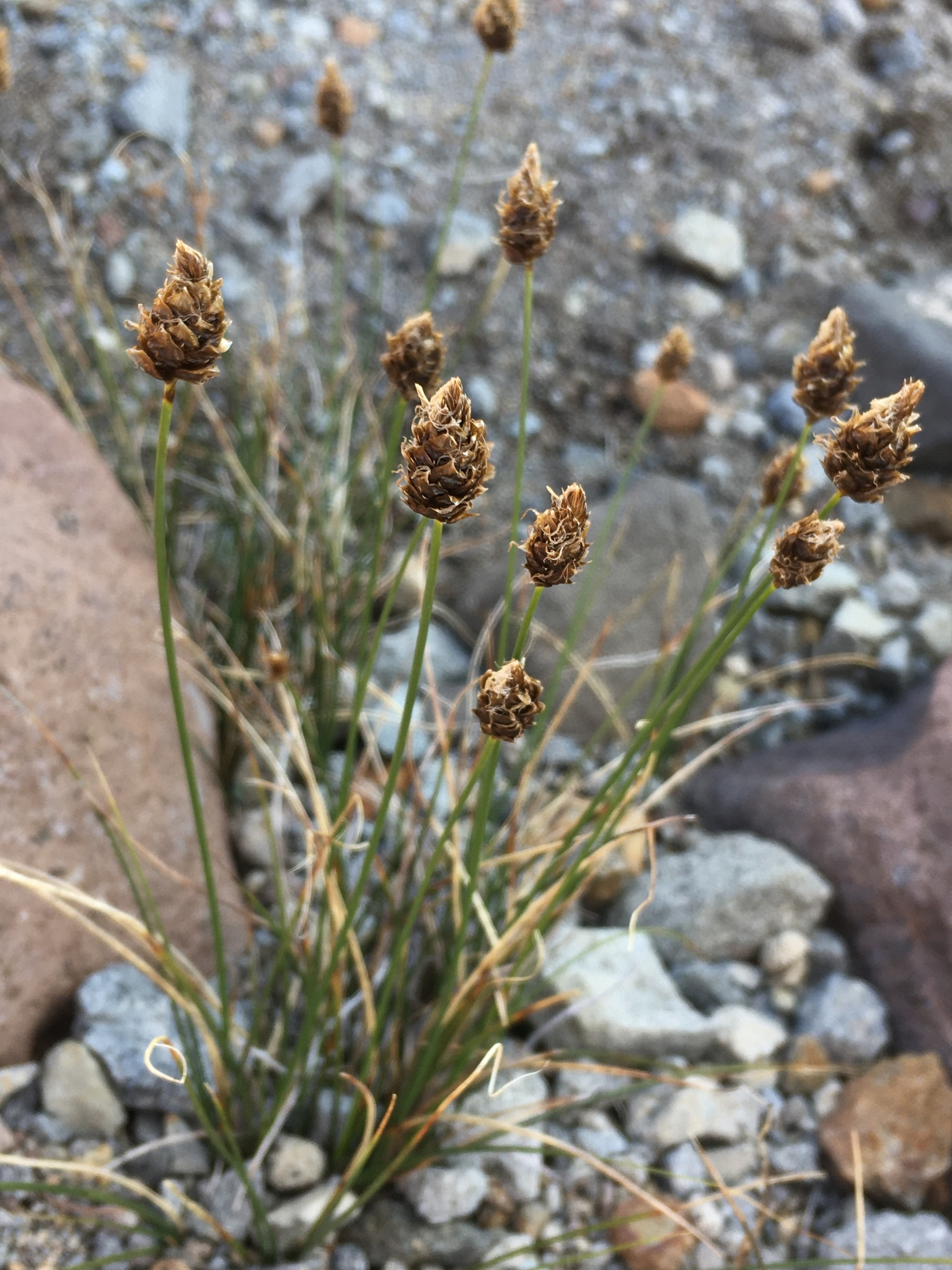

Scientific classification
- Kingdom: Plantae
- Clade: Tracheophytes
- Clade: Angiosperms
- Clade: Monocots
- Clade: Commelinids
- Order: Poales
- Family: Cyperaceae
- Genus: Carex
- Subgenus: Carex subg. Euthyceras
- Section: Carex sect. Inflatae
- Species: C. breweri

Binomial name
- Carex breweri Boott

= Carex breweri =

Species of grass-like plant

Carex breweri, known as Brewer's sedge, is a species of sedge that grows on dry rocky or gravel slopes in the Sierra Nevada and Cascade Mountains of the western United States, as far north as Mount Hood. It is classified in Carex sect. Inflatae, alongside Carex engelmannii and Carex subnigricans.
