= Three Sisters (Oregon) =

Three volcanic peaks in Oregon, U.S.

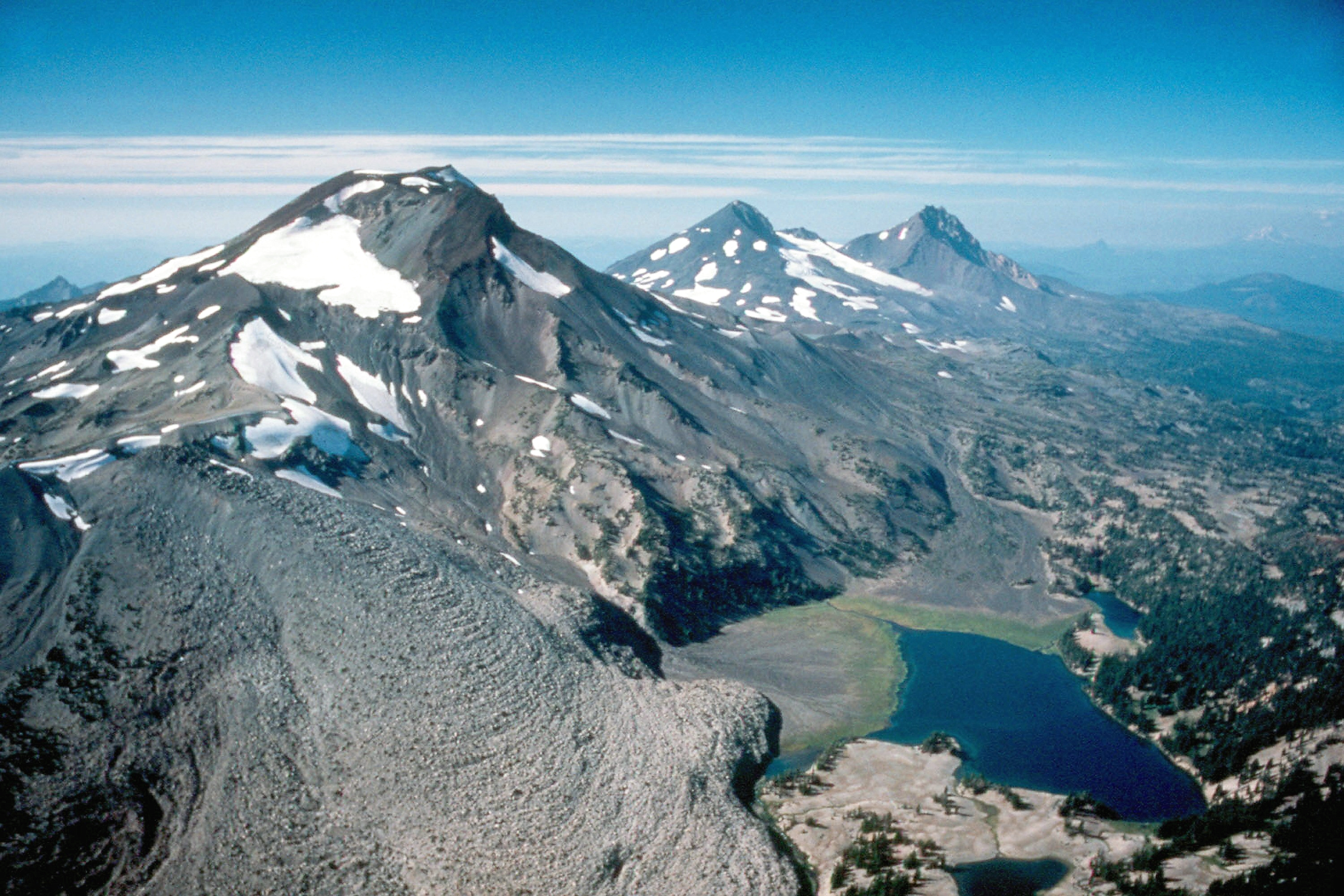
- The Three Sisters, looking north

Highest point
- Elevation: South 10,363 ft (3,158.5 m) NAVD 88; Middle 10,052 ft (3,063.7 m) NAVD 88; North 10,090 ft (3,075.3 m) NAVD 88
- Prominence: 5,588 feet (1,703 m) (South Sister)
- Listing: US most prominent peaks, 85th (South Sister)
- Coordinates: 44°06′12″N 121°46′09″W

Geography
- Location within Oregon Location within the United States
- Location: Lane and Deschutes counties, Oregon, U.S.
- Parent range: Cascade Range
- Topo map(s): USGS South Sister and North Sister

Geology
- Formed by: Subduction zone volcanism
- Rock age: Quaternary
- Mountain type(s): Two stratovolcanoes (South, Middle) and one shield volcano (North)
- Volcanic arc: Cascade Volcanic Arc
- Last eruption: 440 CE

Climbing
- Easiest route: Hiking or scrambling, plus glacier travel on some routes

The Three Sisters are a trio of closely spaced volcanic peaks in the U.S. state of Oregon. Named North, Middle, and South, they are part of the Cascade Volcanic Arc, a segment of the Cascade Range in western North America extending from southern British Columbia through Washington and Oregon to Northern California. Each over 10,000 feet (3,000 meters) in elevation, they are the third-, fourth- and fifth-highest peaks in Oregon.

Located in the Three Sisters Wilderness at the boundary of Lane and Deschutes counties and the Willamette and Deschutes national forests, they are about 10 miles (16 kilometers) south of the nearest town, Sisters. Diverse species of flora and fauna inhabit the area, which is subject to frequent snowfall, occasional rain, and extreme temperature variation between seasons. The mountains, particularly South Sister, are popular destinations for climbing and scrambling.

Although they are often grouped together as one unit, the three mountains have their own individual geology and eruptive history. Neither North Sister nor Middle Sister have erupted in the last 14,000 years, and it is considered unlikely that either will ever erupt again. South Sister last erupted about 2,000 years ago and could erupt in the future, threatening life within the region. After satellite imagery detected ground inflation near South Sister in 2001, the United States Geological Survey improved monitoring in the immediate area.

== Geography ==
The Three Sisters are at the boundary of Lane and Deschutes counties and the Willamette and Deschutes national forests in the U.S. state of Oregon, about 10 miles (16 kilometers) south of the nearest town of Sisters. The three peaks are the third-, fourth-, and fifth-highest in Oregon, and contain 16 named glaciers. Their ice volume totals 5.6 billion cubic feet (160 million cubic metres). The Sisters were named Faith, Hope and Charity by early settlers, but are now known as North Sister, Middle Sister and South Sister, respectively.

=== Wilderness ===
The Three Sisters Wilderness covers an area of 281,190 acres (1,137.9 km^{2}), making it the second-largest wilderness area in Oregon. Designated by the United States Congress in 1964, it borders the Mount Washington Wilderness to the north and shares its southern edge with the Waldo Lake Wilderness. The area includes 260 mi (420 km) of trails and many forests, lakes, waterfalls, and streams, including the source of Whychus Creek. The Three Sisters and nearby Broken Top account for about a third of the Three Sisters Wilderness, and this area is known as the Alpine Crest Region. Rising from about 5,200 ft (1,600 m) to 10,358 ft (3,157 m) in elevation, the Alpine Crest Region features the wilderness area's most-frequented glaciers, lakes, and meadows.

=== Physical geography ===
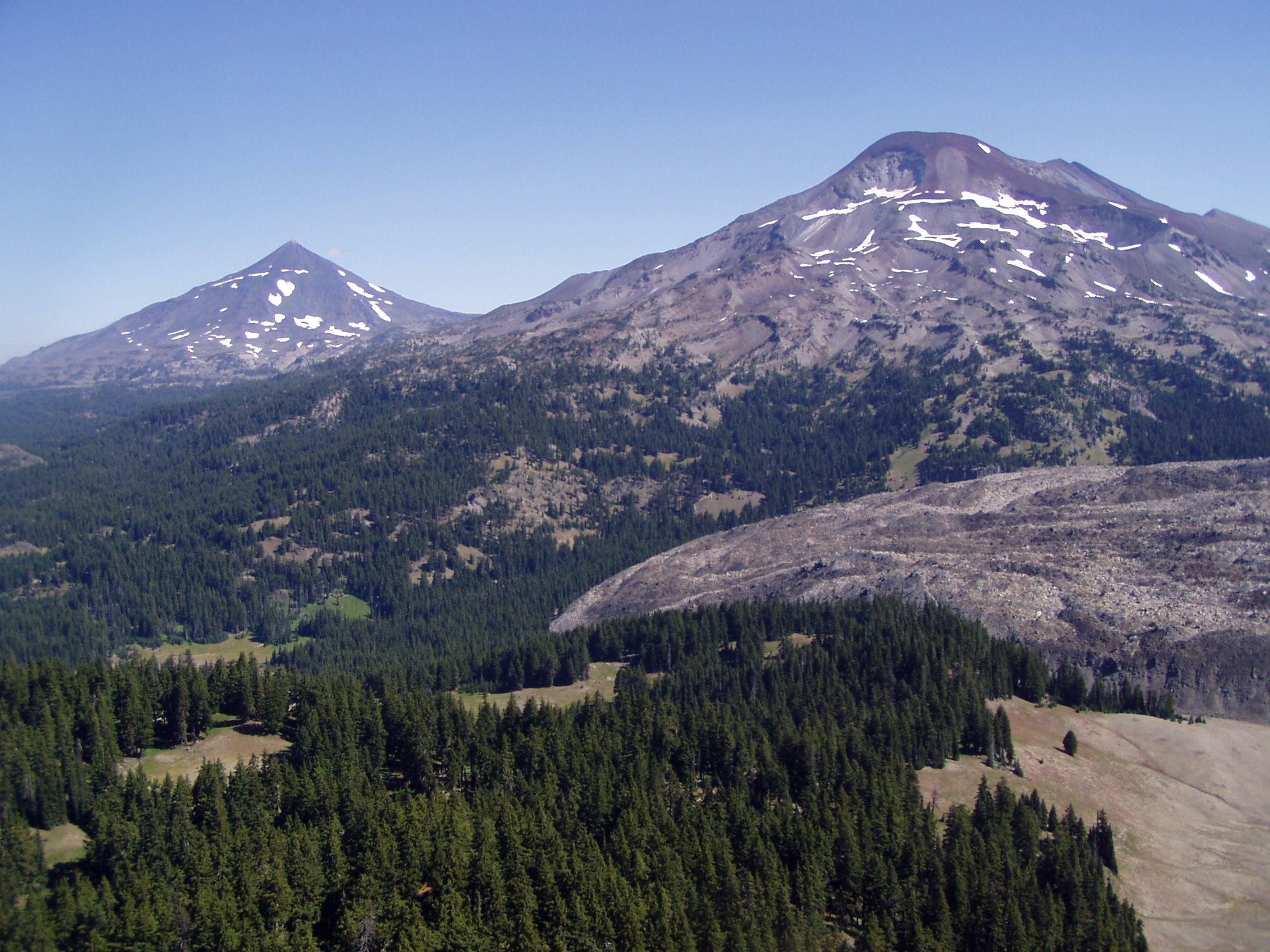
Aerial view over the Three Sisters Wilderness, showing Middle Sister (left) and South Sister

Weather varies greatly in the area due to the rain shadow caused by the Cascade Range. Air from the Pacific Ocean rises over the western slopes, which causes it to cool and dump its moisture as rain (or snow in the winter). Precipitation increases with elevation. Once the moisture is wrung from the air, the air descends on the eastern side of the crest, which causes it to become warmer and drier. On the western slopes, precipitation ranges from 80 to 125 in (200 to 320 centimeters) annually, while precipitation over the eastern slopes varies from 40 to 80 in (100 to 200 cm) in the east. Temperature extremes reach 80 to 90 degrees Fahrenheit (27 to 32 degrees Celsius) in summers and −20 to −30 °F (−29 to −34 °C) during the winters.

The Three Sisters have about 130 snowfields and glaciers ranging in altitude from 6,742 to 10,308 ft (2,055 to 3,142 m) with a cumulative surface area of about 2,500 acres (10 km^{2}). The Linn and Villard Glaciers are north of the North Sister summit, while the Thayer Glacier is on its eastern slope. The Collier Glacier is nestled between North Sister and Middle Sister and flows to the northwest. The Renfrew and Hayden Glaciers are on the northwestern and northeastern slopes of Middle Sister, respectively, while the Diller Glacier is on its southeastern slope. The Irving, Carver and Skinner Glaciers lie between Middle Sister and South Sister. Finally, around the summit of South Sister, in a clockwise direction, are the Prouty, Lewis, Clark, Lost Creek, and Eugene Glaciers. The Collier Glacier, despite a 4,900 ft (1,500 m) retreat and a 64% loss of its surface area between 1910 and 1994, is generally considered to be the largest glacier of the Three Sisters at 160 acres (0.65 km^{2}). Eliot Glacier on Mount Hood is now two-and-a-half times larger than the Collier Glacier. According to sources, the Prouty Glacier is sometimes considered to be larger than the Collier glacier.

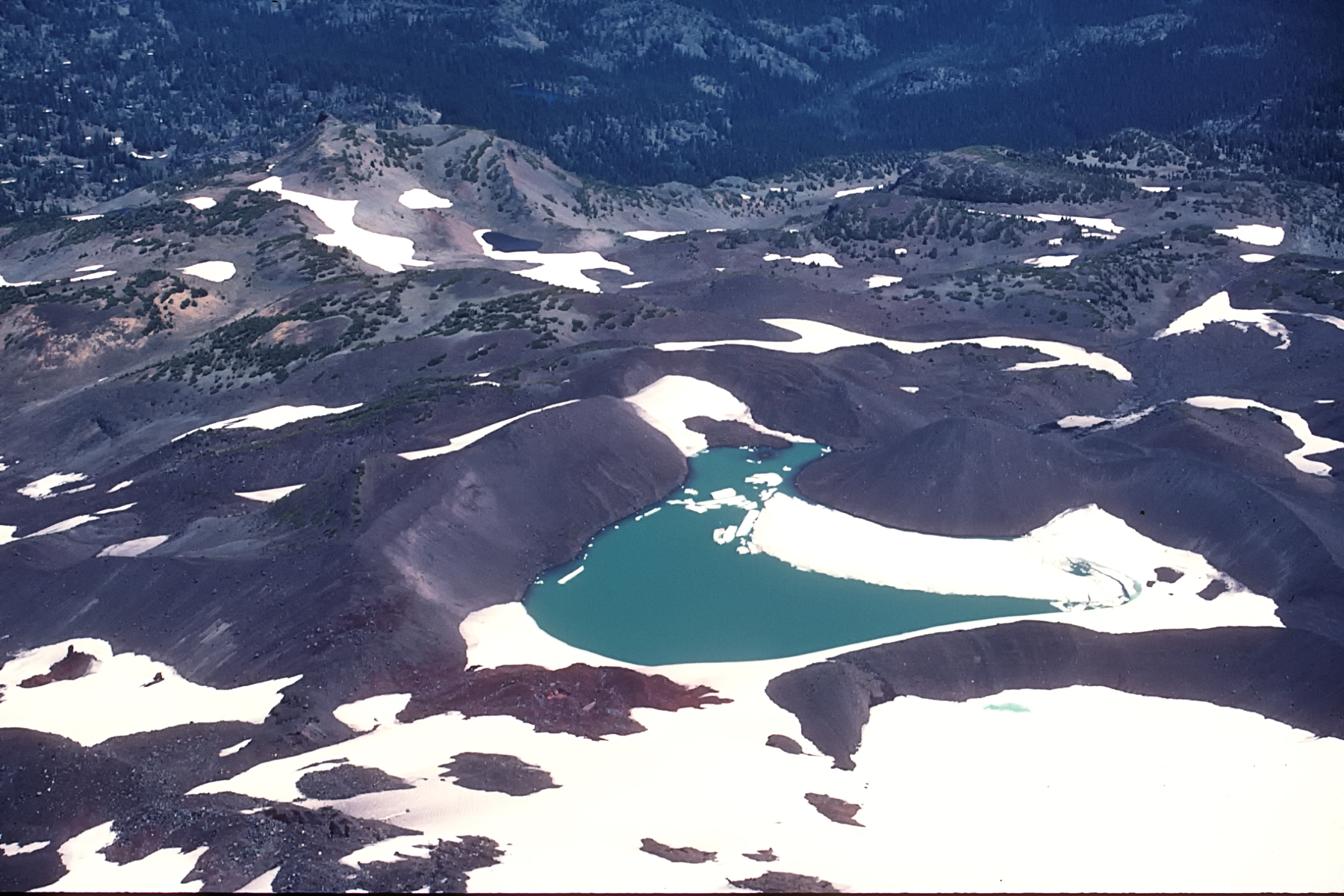
Carver Lake is dammed by a glacial moraine and could produce a dangerous lahar in a volcanic eruption.

When Little Ice Age glaciers retreated during the 20th century, water filled in the spaces left behind, forming moraine-dammed lakes, which are more common in the Three Sisters Wilderness than anywhere else in the contiguous U.S. The local area has a history of flash floods, including an event on October 7, 1966, caused by a sudden avalanche; this flash flood reached the Cascade Lakes Scenic Byway. Concerned about the hazard of similar flooding events, scientists in the 1980s from the U.S. Geological Survey (USGS) identified that Carver Lake on South Sister could flood and breach its natural dam, producing a large mudflow that could endanger wilderness visitors and the town of Sisters. Studies at Collier Lake and Diller Lake suggested that both had breached their dams in the early 1940s and in 1970, respectively. Other moraine-dammed lakes within the wilderness area include Thayer Lake on North Sister's east flank and four members of the Chambers Lakes group between Middle and South Sister.

Before settlement of the area at the end of the 19th century, wildfires frequently burned through the local forests, especially the ponderosa pine forests on the eastern slopes. Due to fire suppression over the past century, the forests have become overgrown, and at higher elevations, they are further susceptible to summertime fires, which threaten surrounding life and property. In the 21st century, wildfires have been larger and more common in the Deschutes National Forest. In September 2012, a lightning strike caused a fire that burned 41 square miles (110 km^{2}) in the Pole Creek area within the Three Sisters Wilderness, leaving the area closed until May 2013. In August 2017, officials closed 417 mi^{2} (1,080 km^{2}) in the western half of the Three Sisters Wilderness, including 24 mi (39 km) of the Pacific Crest Trail, to the public because of 11 lightning-caused fires, including the Milli Fire. As a result of the increasing incidence of fires, public officials have factored the role of wildfire into planning, including organizing prescribed fires with scientists to protect habitats at risk while minimizing adverse effects on air quality and environmental health.

== Geology ==
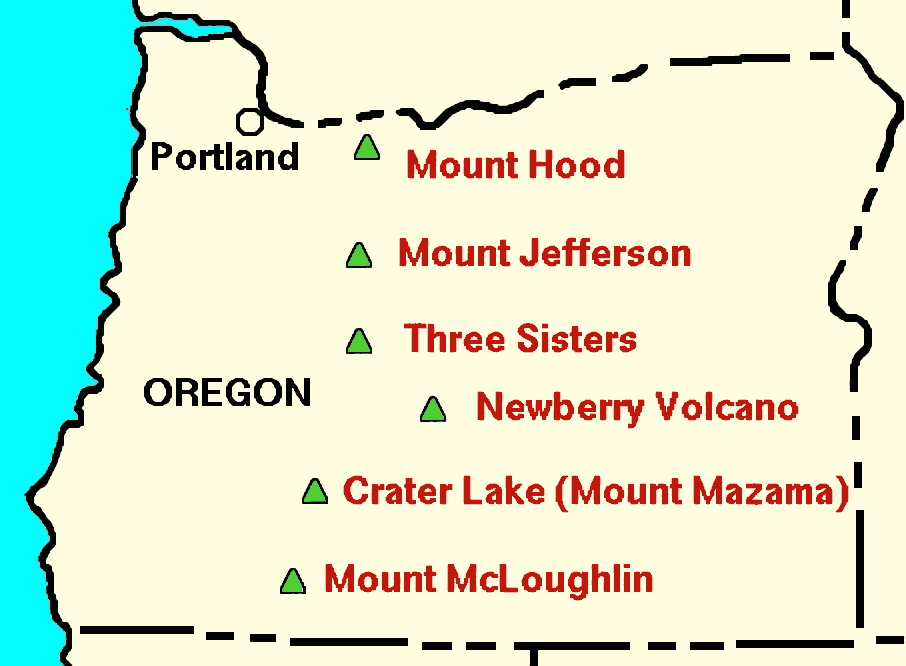
Location of the Three Sisters relative to other major volcanoes in the Cascade Range of Oregon

The Three Sisters join several other volcanoes in the eastern segment of the Cascade Range known as the High Cascades, which trends north–south. The High Cascades are the most recent volcanic arc in the Pacific Northwest, which forms the Cascade Volcanoes. These volcanoes, including the Three Sisters, were fed by magma chambers resulting from the subduction of the Juan de Fuca tectonic plate under the western edge of the North American tectonic plate.

Each of the three volcanoes formed at different times from several variable magmatic sources. The amount of rhyolite present in the lavas of the younger two mountains is unusual relative to nearby peaks. The Three Sisters form the leading edge of a rhyolitic crustal-melting anomaly, which might be explained by a combination of mantle flow (movement of Earth's solid silicate mantle layer caused by convection currents) and decompression that has generated similar melting and rhyolitic volcanism nearby for the past 16 million years.

The three mountains were also shaped by the changing climate of the Pleistocene epoch, during which multiple glacial periods occurred and glaciers eroded the mountains.

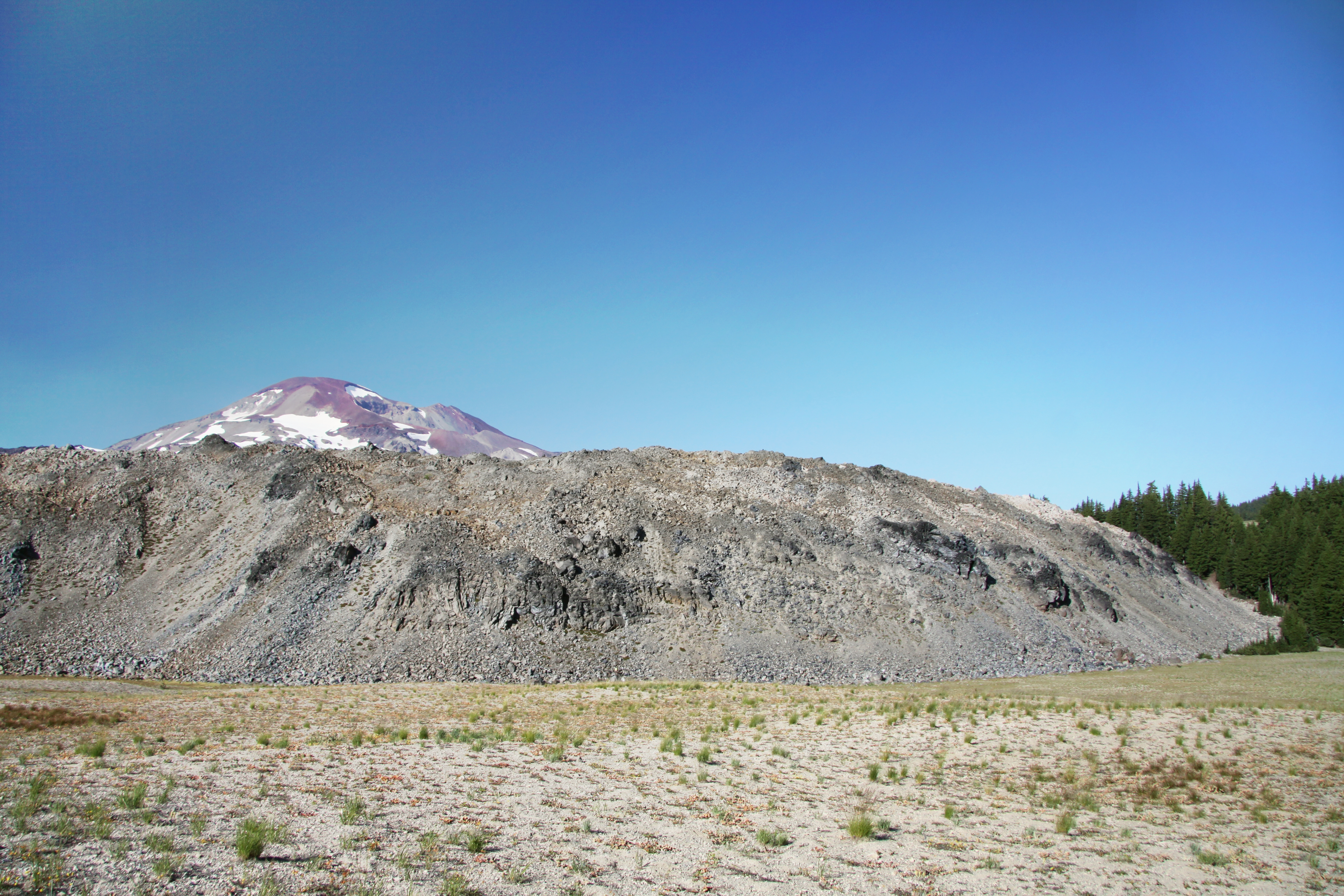
Rock Mesa is an example of a rhyolite dome near the Three Sisters. South Sister rises in the background.

The Three Sisters form the center of a region of closely grouped volcanic peaks. This is in contrast to the typical 40-to-60 mi (64-to-97 km) spacing between volcanoes elsewhere in the Cascades. Among the most active volcanic areas in the Cascades and one of the most densely populated volcanic centers in the world, the Three Sisters region includes nearby peaks such as Belknap Crater, Mount Washington, Black Butte, and Three Fingered Jack to the north, and Broken Top and Mount Bachelor to the south. Most of the surrounding volcanoes consist of mafic (basaltic) lavas; only South and Middle Sister have an abundance of silicic rocks such as andesite, dacite, and rhyodacite. Mafic magma is less viscous; it produces lava flows and is less prone to explosive eruptions than silicic magma.

The region was active in the Pleistocene, with eruptions between about 650,000 and about 250,000 years ago from an explosively active complex known as the Tumalo volcanic center. This area features andesitic and mafic cinder cones such as Lava Butte, as well as rhyolite domes. Cinder cones accumulate from the airfall of many pyroclastic rock fragments of various sizes, while the viscous rhyolite domes extrude onto the surface like toothpaste.

The Tumalo volcano spread ignimbrites and plinian deposits in ground eruptions across the area, similar to the eruption of Vesuvius that destroyed Pompeii. These deposits spread from Tumalo to the town of Bend. Basaltic lava flows from North Sister overlay the youngest Tumalo pyroclastic deposits, indicating that North Sister was active more recently than 260,000 years ago.

=== North Sister ===
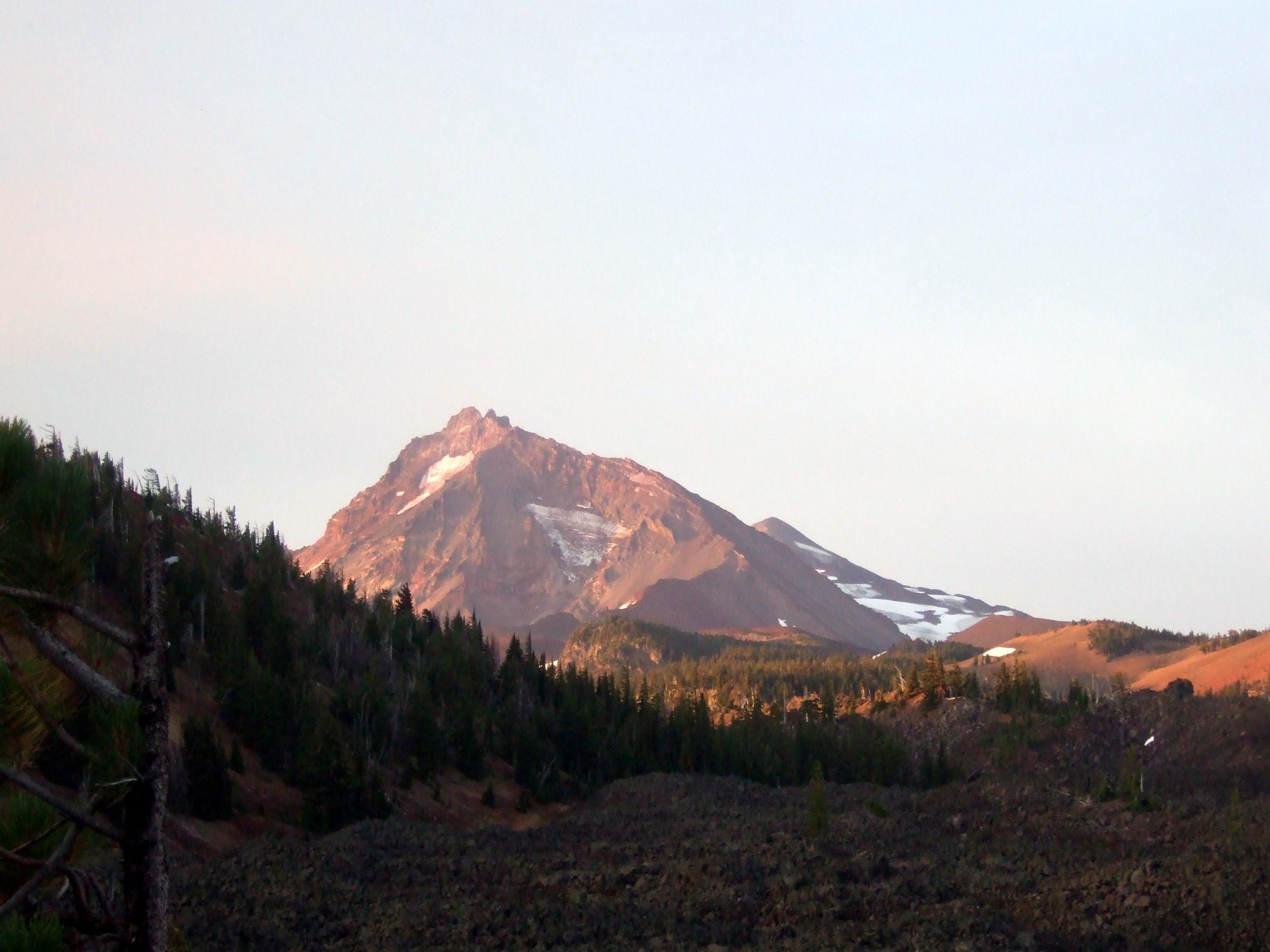
North Sister

North Sister, also known as "Faith", is the oldest and most highly eroded of the three, with zigzagging rock pinnacles between glaciers. It is a shield volcano that overlays a more ancient shield volcano named Little Brother. North Sister is 5 mi (8 km) wide, and its summit elevation is 10,090 ft (3,075 m). Consisting primarily of basaltic andesite, it has a more mafic composition than the other two volcanoes. Its deposits are rich in palagonite and red and black cinders, and they are progressively more iron-rich the younger they are. North Sister's lava flows demonstrate similar compositions throughout the mountain's long eruptive history. The oldest lava flows on North Sister have been dated to roughly 311,000 years ago, though the oldest reliably dated deposits are approximately 119,000 years old. Estimates place the volcano's last eruption at 46,000 years ago, in the Late Pleistocene.

North Sister possesses more dikes than any similar Cascade peak, caused by lava intruding into pre-existing rocks. Many of these dikes were pushed aside by the intrusion of a 980 ft (300 m)-wide volcanic plug. The dikes and plug were exposed by centuries of erosion. At one point, the volcano stood more than 11,000 ft (3,400 m) high, but erosion reduced this volume by a quarter to a third. The plug is now exposed and forms North Sister's summits at Prouty Peak and the South Horn.

=== Middle Sister ===
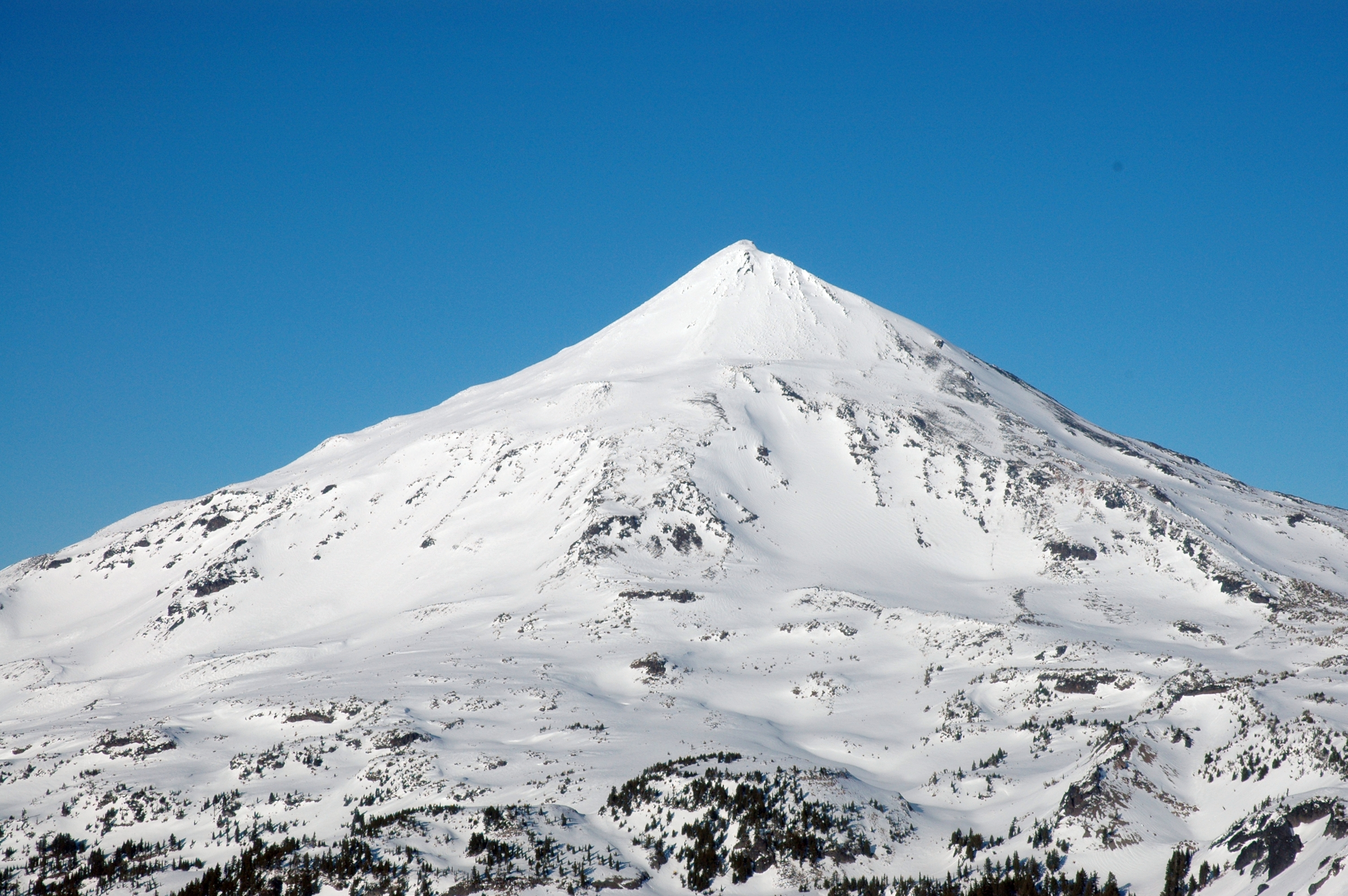
Middle Sister is cone-shaped.

Middle Sister, also known as "Hope", is a basaltic stratovolcano that has also erupted more-viscous andesite, dacite, and rhyodacite. The smallest and least studied of the three, Middle Sister began eruptive activity 48,000 years ago, and it was primarily built by eruptions occurring between 25,000 and 18,000 years ago. One of the earliest major eruptive events (about 38,000 years ago) produced the rhyolite of Obsidian Cliffs on the mountain's northwestern flank. Thick and rich in dacite, the flows extended from the northern and southern sides. They stand in contrast to older, andesitic lava remains that reach as far as 4.3 mi (7 km) from its base.

With an elevation of 10,052 ft (3,064 m), the mountain is cone-shaped. The eastern side has been heavily eroded by glaciation, while the western face is mostly intact. Of the Three Sisters, Middle Sister has the largest ice cover. The Hayden and Diller glaciers continue to cut into the east face, while the Renfrew Glacier sits on the northwestern slope. The large but retreating Collier Glacier, which contains 700 million cubic feet (20×10^{6} m^{3}) of ice and is the thickest and largest glacier in the region, descends along the north side of Middle Sister, cutting into the west side of North Sister. Erosion from Pleistocene and Holocene glaciation exposed a plug near the center of Middle Sister.

=== South Sister ===
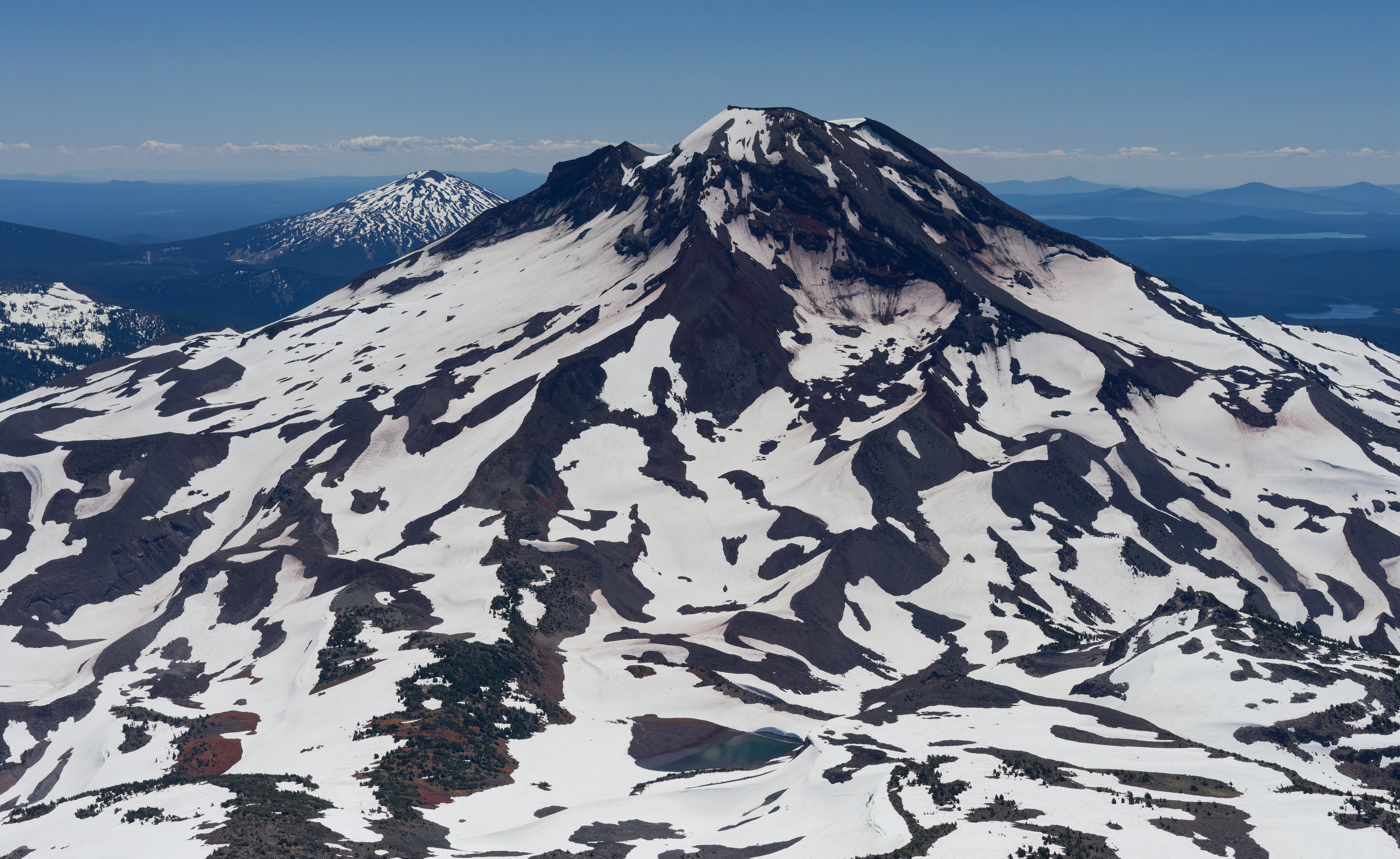
South Sister

South Sister, also known as "Charity", is the tallest volcano of the trio, standing at 10,363 ft (3,159 m). The eruptive products range from basaltic andesite to rhyolite and rhyodacite. It is a predominantly rhyolitic stratovolcano overlying an older shield structure. Its modern structure is no more than 50,000 years old, and it last erupted about 2,000 years ago. Although its first eruptive events from 50,000 to 30,000 years ago were predominantly rhyolitic, between 38,000 and 32,000 years ago the volcano began to alternate between dacitic/rhyodacitic and rhyolitic eruptions. The volcano built a broad andesitic cone, forming a steep summit cone of andesite about 27,000 years ago. South Sister remained dormant for 15,000 years, after which its composition shifted from dacitic to more rhyolitic lava. An eruptive episode about 2,200 years ago, termed the Rock Mesa eruptive cycle, first spread volcanic ash from flank vents from the south and southwest flanks, followed by a thick rhyolite lava flow. Next, the Devils Hill eruptive cycle consisted of explosive ash eruptions followed by viscous rhyolitic lava flows. Unlike the previous eruptive period, it was caused by the intrusion of a dike of new silicic magma that erupted from 20 vents on the southeast side and from a smaller line on the north side. These eruptions generated pyroclastic flows and lava domes from vents on the northern, southern, eastern, and southeastern sides of the volcano. These relatively recent, postglacial eruptions suggest the presence of a silicic magma reservoir under South Sister, one that could perhaps lead to future eruptions.

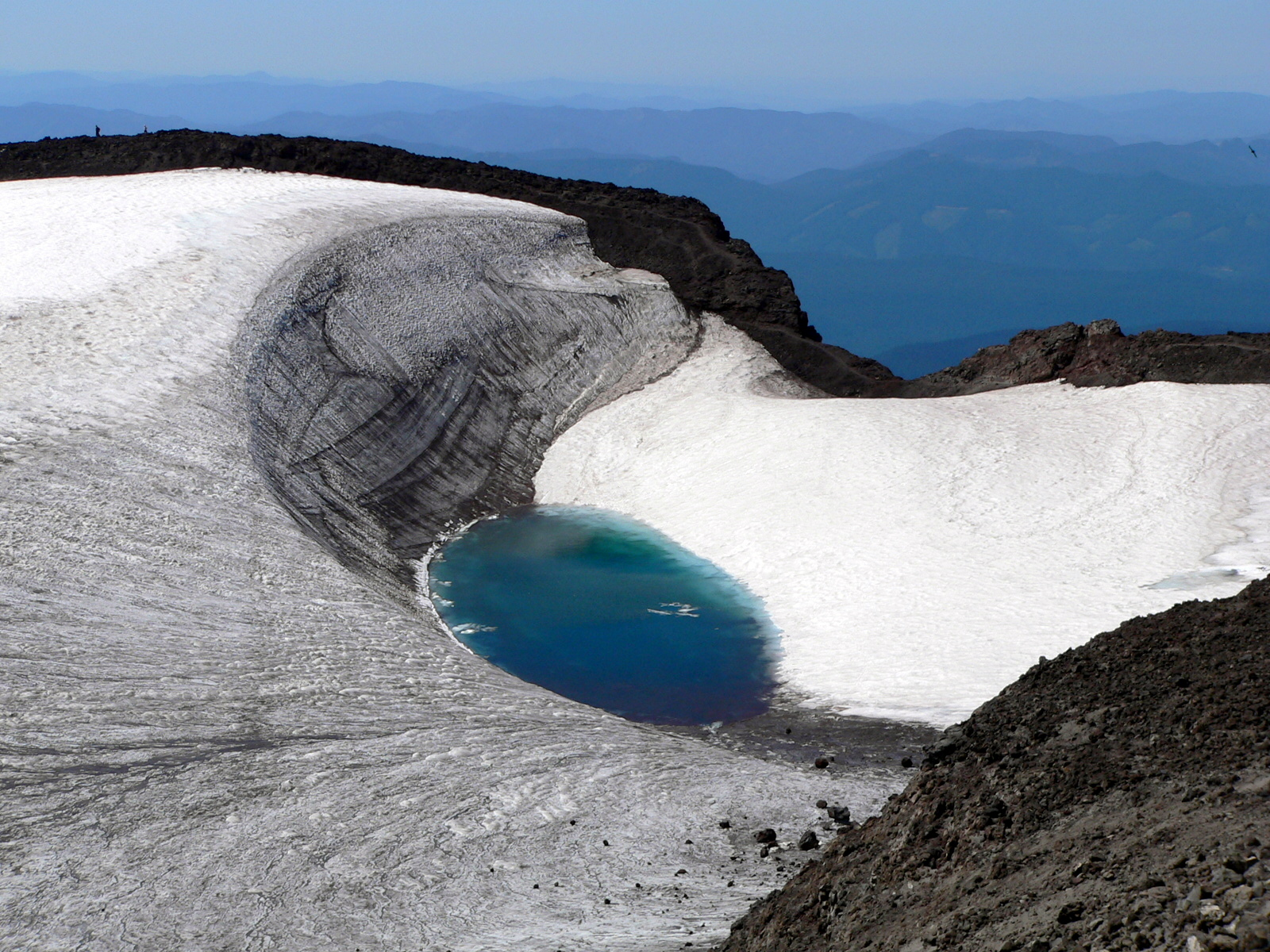
Teardrop Pool on South Sister is the highest lake in Oregon.

Unlike its sister peaks, South Sister has an uneroded summit crater about 0.25 mi (0.40 km) in diameter that holds a small crater lake known as Teardrop Pool, the highest lake in Oregon. Teardrop Pool varies in shape, size and elevation, but averages about 150 feet long and 50 feet wide at an elevation of nearly 10,200 feet. The pool is formed from melting ice in the nearly 200-foot thick summit icecap each summer. Though it often doesn't form until well into summer, it sometimes starts forming in late June and early July. The pool usually displays light shades of blue (darkening in deeper spots) and is nestled in a deep snowy grotto in the summit's icecap. In recent years, the pool has begun to display green coloration late in the summer season, presumably from algae growth. Teardrop Pool has been sinking in elevation in recent years due to the decreasing ice volume of the crater icecap. The pool gained its name with the publication of the 7.5 minute South Sister topographic map by the United States Geological Survey in 1988. The cone of the volcano consists of basaltic andesite along with red scoria and tephra, with exposed black and red inner walls made of scoria. Hodge Crest, a false peak, formed between 28,000 and 24,000 years ago, roughly around the same time as the main cone.

Despite its relatively young age, every part of South Sister other than its peak has undergone significant erosion due to Pleistocene and Holocene glaciation. Between 30,000 and 15,000 years ago, South Sister's southern flanks were covered with ice streams, and a small amount of ice extended below 3,600 ft (1,100 m). On the volcano's northern flank, erosion from these glaciers exposed a headwall about 1,200 ft (370 m) high. During the Holocene, smaller glaciers formed, alternating between advance and retreat, depositing moraines and till between 7,000 and 9,000 ft (2,100 and 2,700 m) on the mountain. The Lewis and Clark glaciers have cirques, or glacial valleys, that made the outer walls of the crater rim significantly steeper. The slopes of South Sister contain small glaciers, including the Lost Creek and Prouty glaciers.

=== Recent history and potential hazards ===
When the first geological reconnaissance of the Three Sisters region was published in 1925, its author, Edwin T. Hodge, suggested that the Three Sisters and five smaller mountains in the present-day wilderness area were the remains of an enormous collapsed volcano that had been active during the Miocene or early Pliocene epochs. Naming this ancient volcano Mount Multnomah, Hodge theorized that it had collapsed to form a caldera just as Mount Mazama collapsed to form Crater Lake. In the 1940s, Howel Williams completed an analysis of the Three Sisters vicinity and concluded that Multnomah had never existed, instead demonstrating that each volcano in the area possessed its own individual eruptive history. Williams' 1944 paper defined the basic outline of the Three Sisters vicinity, though he lacked access to chemical techniques and radiometric dating. Over the past 70 years, scientists have published several reconnaissance maps and petrographic studies of the Three Sisters, including a detailed geological map published in 2012.

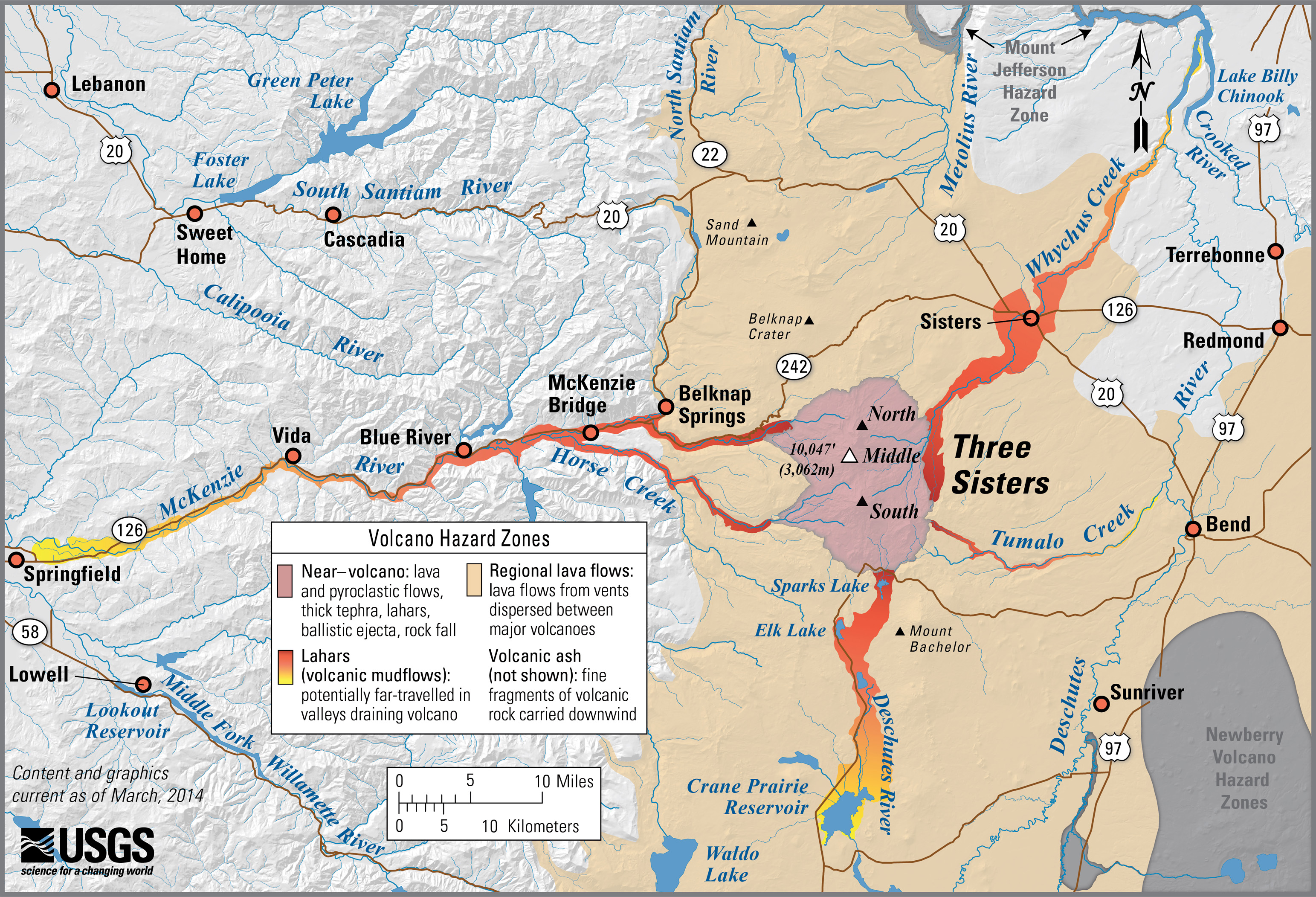
Map of hazards from the Three Sisters showing risk of lava flows and lahars in the immediate area

Neither North nor Middle Sister is likely to resume volcanic activity. An eruption from South Sister would pose a threat to nearby life, as the proximal danger zone extends 1.2 to 6.2 mi (2 to 10 km) from the volcano's summits. During an eruption, tephra could accumulate to 1 to 2 in (25 to 51 millimetres) in the city of Bend, and mudflows and pyroclastic flows could run down the sides of the mountain, threatening any life in their paths. Eruptions from South Sister could be either explosive or effusive, though an eruption of ash with local volcanic rock accumulation and slow lava flows is considered most likely. The Three Sisters area does not have fumarole activity, although there are hot springs west of South Sister.

From 1986 to 1987, the USGS surveyed the Three Sisters vicinity with tilt-leveling networks and electro-optical distance meters, but South Sister was not the subject of close geodetic analysis until the early 2000s. In 2001, scientists inferred magmatic activity near South Sister from InSAR satellite data that showed uplift of the ground surface in an area centered approximately 3 mi (4.8 km) west of the mountain. The data showed a maximum of approximately 130 mm (5.1 in) of uplift from 1995 to 2001. The inflation episode was probably caused by the accumulation of magma or hot water and gases about 6 to 7 km (3.7 to 4.3 mi) underground. A 2002 study inferred that the inflation was due to intruding magma, likely of basaltic to rhyolitic composition, into an existing magma reservoir. A 2011 study described the cumulative magma intrusion as 50 to 70 million cubic metres (1.8×10^{9} to 2.5×10^{9} ft^{3}) in volume.

Beginning in 2001, the Cascades Volcano Observatory conducted field surveys and installed two new monitoring stations near the Three Sisters, including a GPS station and seismometer at The Husband, a peak west of the Three Sisters. In 2004, this seismometer detected an earthquake swarm in the area of uplift. The hundreds of small earthquakes subsided after several days. According to a 2011 study, this swarm may have initiated a significant decrease in the peak uplift rate. GPS and satellite observations showed that the rate of uplift west of South Sister gradually decreased from 2001 to 2020. A small increase in the uplift rate began in the same area between 2020 and 2021, and small earthquake swarms were recorded in 2021 and 2022.

== Ecology ==
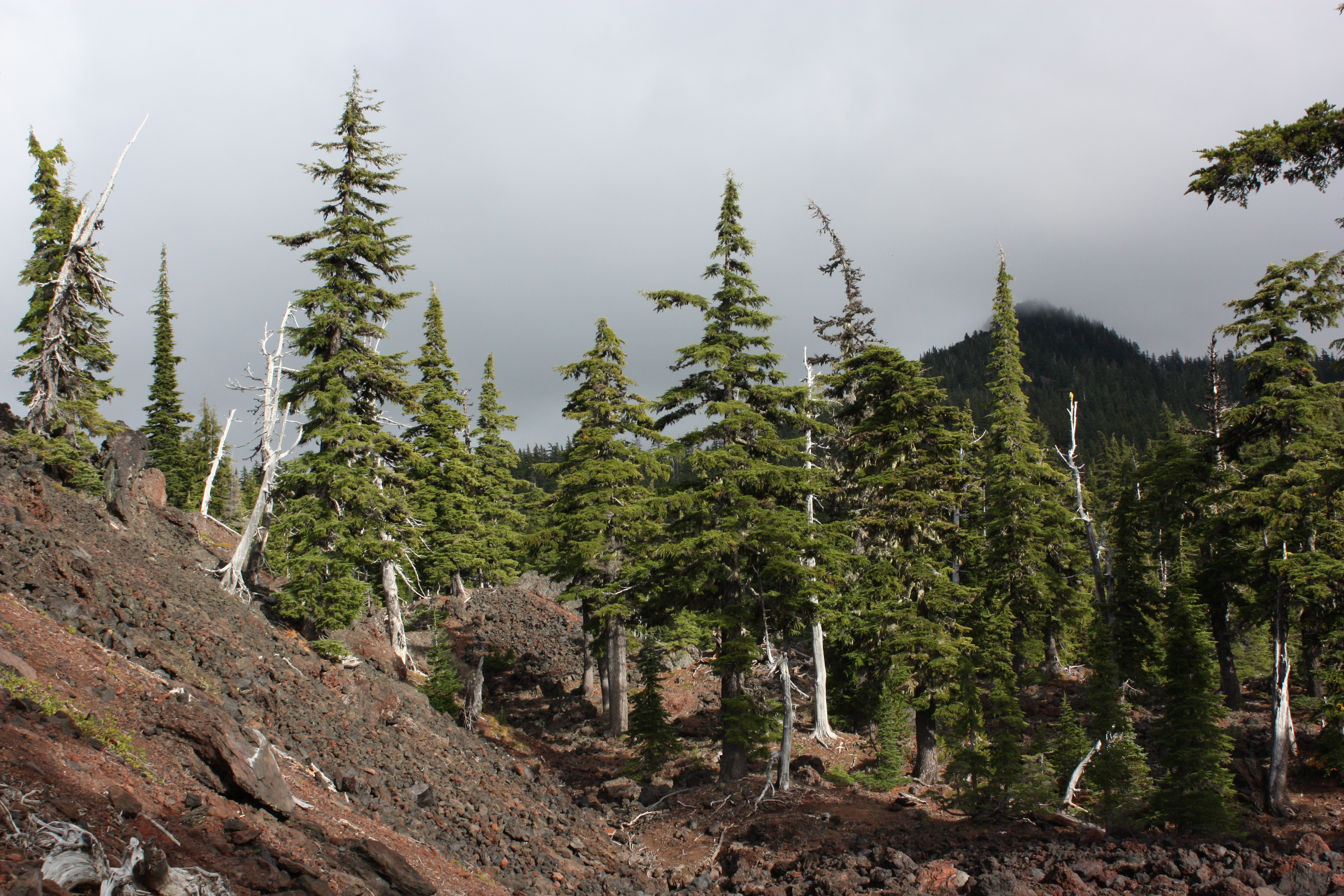
Mountain hemlock growing on andesitic lava

The ecology of the Three Sisters reflect their location in central Oregon's Cascade Range. The westside slopes from 3,000 to 6,500 ft (910 to 2,000 m) lie in the Western Cascade Montane Highlands ecoregion, where precipitation is abundant. Forests here consist predominantly of Douglas-fir and western hemlock, with minor components of mountain hemlock, noble fir, subalpine fir, grand fir, Pacific silver fir, red alder, and Pacific yew. Vine maples, rhododendron, Oregon grape, huckleberry, and thimbleberry grow beneath the trees. Douglas-fir is dominant below 3,500 ft (1,100 m), while western hemlock dominates above.

Timberline at the Three Sisters occurs at 6,500 ft (2,000 m), where the forest canopy opens and the subalpine zone begins. These forests lie in the Cascade Crest montane forest ecoregion. Mountain hemlock trees dominate the forest in this area, while meadows sustain sedges, dwarf willows, tufted hairgrass, lupine, red paintbrush, and Newberry knotweed.

Tree line occurs at 7,500 feet (2,300 m). The vegetation in this harsh alpine zone consists of herbaceous and shrubby subalpine meadows. This zone has a large winter snowpack, with low temperatures for much of the year. There are patches of mountain hemlock, subalpine fir, and whitebark pine near the treeline, as well as wet meadows supporting Brewer's sedge, Holm's sedge, black alpine sedge, tufted hairgrass, and alpine aster. Near the peaks of the Three Sisters, there are extensive areas of bare rock.

The lower eastern slopes of the Three Sisters below 5,200 ft (1,600 m) lie in the Ponderosa Pine/Bitterbrush Woodland ecoregion. This ecoregion has less precipitation than the western slopes and has soil derived from Mazama Ash (ash erupted from Mount Mazama). Stream flow changes little throughout the year due to the region's volcanic hydrogeology. These slopes support nearly pure stands of ponderosa pine. Understory vegetation includes greenleaf manzanita and snowberry at higher elevations and antelope bitterbrush at lower elevations. Mountain alder, stream dogwood, willows, and sedges grow along streams.

Local fauna includes birds such as blue and ruffed grouse, small mammals like pikas, chipmunks, and golden-mantled ground squirrels, and larger species like the Columbian black-tailed deer, mule deer, Roosevelt elk, and American black bear. Bobcats, cougars, coyotes, wolverines, martens, badgers, weasels, bald eagles, and several hawk species are many of the predators throughout the Three Sisters area.

== Human history ==
The Three Sisters area was occupied by Amerindians since the end of the last glaciation, mainly the Northern Paiute to the east and Molala to the west. They harvested berries, made baskets, hunted, and made obsidian arrowheads and spears. Traces of rock art can be seen at Devils Hill, south of South Sister.

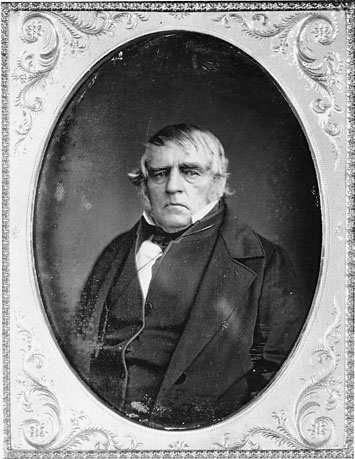
Portrait of Peter Skene Ogden, Western re-discoverer of the Three Sisters, circa 1854

The first Westerner to discover the Three Sisters was the explorer Peter Skene Ogden of the Hudson's Bay Company in 1825. He describes "a number of high mountains" south of Mount Hood. Ten months later in 1826, the botanist David Douglas reported snow-covered peaks visible from the Willamette Valley. As the Willamette Valley was gradually colonized in the 1840s, Euro-Americans approached the summits from the west and probably named them individually at that time. Explorers, such as Nathaniel Jarvis Wyeth in 1839 and John Frémont in 1843, used the Three Sisters as a landmark from the east. The area was further explored by John Strong Newberry in 1855 as part of the Pacific Railroad Surveys.

In 1862, to connect the Willamette Valley to the ranches of Central Oregon and the gold mines of eastern Oregon and Idaho, Felix and Marion Scott traced a route over Scott Pass. This route was known as the Scott Trail, but was superseded in the early 20th century by the McKenzie Pass Road further north. In February 1866, the Seattle Weekly Gazette reported that one of the Three Sisters emitted some fire and smoke.

In the late 19th century, there was extensive wool production in eastern Oregon. Shepherds led their herds of 1,500 to 2,500 sheep to the Three Sisters. They arrived in eastern foothills near Whychus Creek by May or June, and then climbed to higher pastures in August and September. By the 1890s, the area was getting overgrazed. Despite regulatory measures, sheep grazing peaked in 1910 before being banned in the 1930s at North and Middle Sister, and in 1940 at South Sister.

In 1892, President Grover Cleveland decided to create the Cascades Forest Reserve, based on the authority of the Forest Reserve Act of 1891. Cascades Reserve was a strip of land from 20 to 60 mi (30 to 100 km) wide around the main crest of the Cascade Range, stretching from the Columbia River almost to the border with California. In 1905, administration of the Reserve was moved from the United States General Land Office to the United States Forest Service. The Reserve was renamed the Cascade National Forest in 1907. In 1908, the forest was split: the eastern half became the Deschutes National Forest, while the western half merged in 1934 to form the Willamette National Forest.

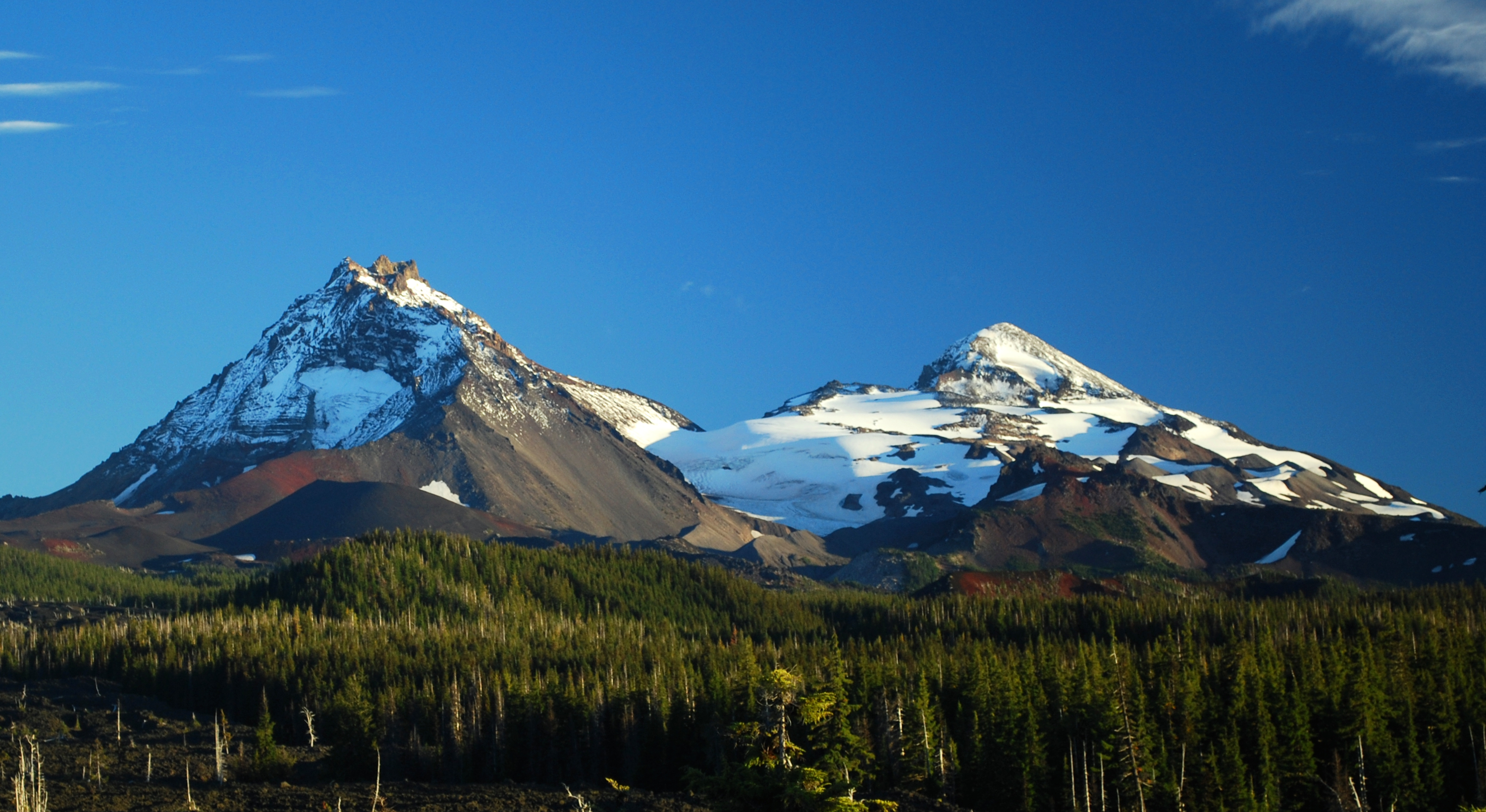
North and Middle Sister, with Collier Glacier between the two peaks

Most of the Three Sisters glaciers were described for the first time by Ira A. Williams in 1916. Collier Glacier, between North and Middle Sister, was first studied and mapped by Edwin Hodge. Ruth Hopsen Keen took a forty-year photographic record of Collier Glacier, documenting part of the 0.93 mi (1,500 m) retreat of the glacier from 1910 to 1994.

In the 1930s, the Three Sisters were part of a proposed National Monument. To maintain its authority over the region, the Forest Service decided to create a 191,108-acre (773 km^{2}) primitive area in 1937. The following year, at the instigation of Forest Service employee Bob Marshall, it was expanded by 55,620 acres (225 km^{2}) in the French Pete Creek basin. In 1957, the Forest Service decided to reclassify the area as a wilderness area and removed the old-growth forest of the French Pete Creek basin, despite protests of local environmental activists. The area became part of the National Wilderness Preservation System when the Wilderness Act of 1964 was passed, but the area still excluded the French Pete Creek basin. Responding to environmental mobilization throughout the state of Oregon, Congress passed the Endangered American Wilderness Act of 1978, which led to the reinstatement of French Pete Creek and its surroundings in the Three Sisters Wilderness Area. The Oregon Wilderness Act of 1984 further expanded the wilderness with the addition of 38,100 acres (154 km^{2}) around Erma Bell Lakes.

== Recreation ==
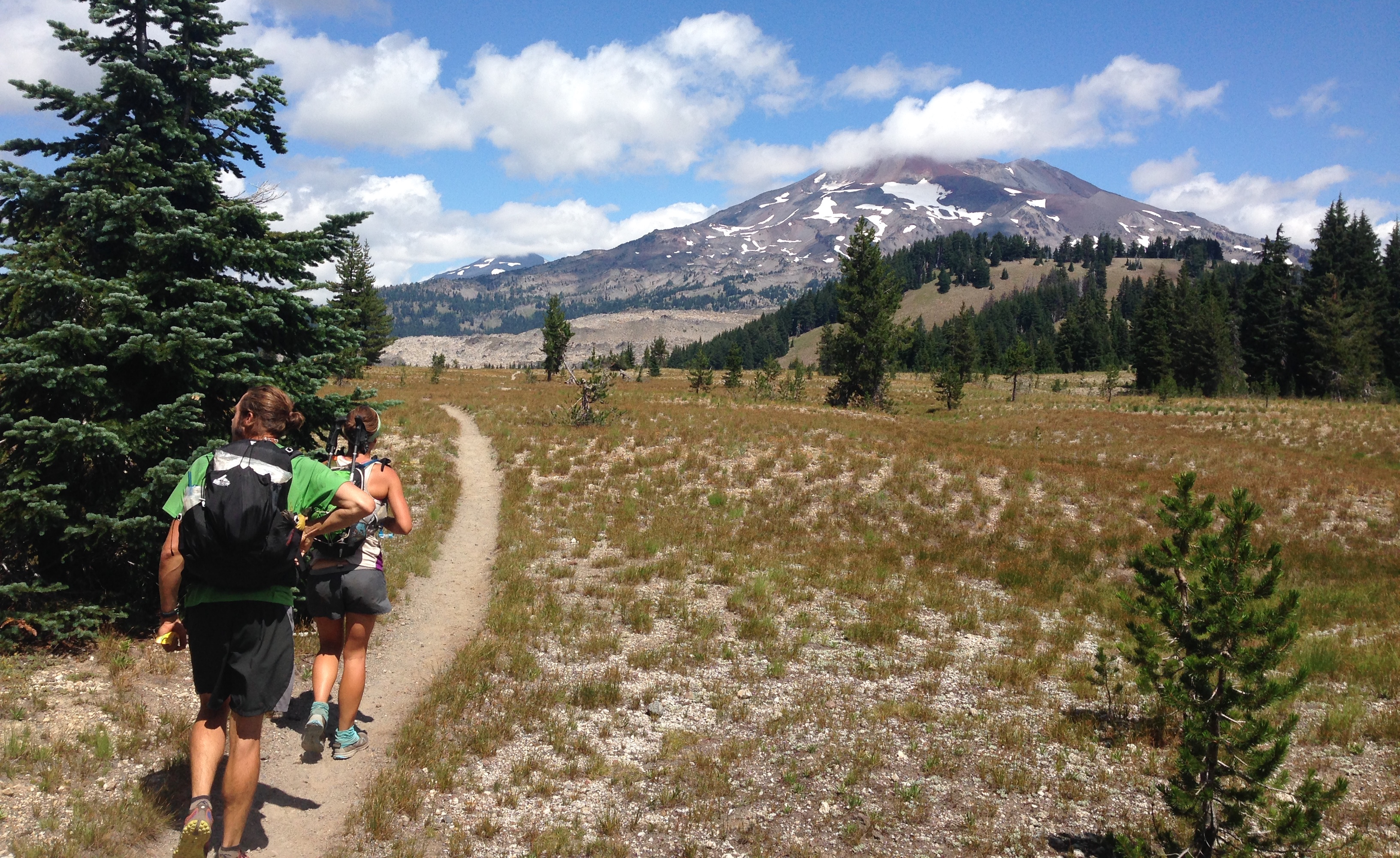
Two hikers on the Pacific Crest Trail in the Three Sisters Wilderness

The Three Sisters are a popular climbing destination for hikers and mountaineers. Due to extensive erosion and rockfall, North Sister is the most dangerous climb of the three peaks, and is often informally called the "Beast of the Cascades". One of its peaks, Little Brother, can be safely scrambled. The first recorded ascent of North Sister was made in 1857 by six people, including Oregon politicians George Lemuel Woods and James McBride, according to a story published in Overland Monthly in 1870. Today, the common trail covers 11 mi (18 km) round-trip, gaining 3,165 ft (965 m) in elevation.

Middle Sister can also be scrambled, for a round trip of 16.4 mi (26.4 km) and an elevation gain of 4,757 ft (1,450 m).

South Sister is the easiest of the three to climb, and has a trail all the way to the summit. The standard route up the south ridge runs for 12.6 mi (20.3 km) round trip, rising from 5,446 ft (1,660 m) at the trailhead to 10,363 ft (3,159 m) at its summit. It is a popular climb during August and September, with up to 400 people each day.

== See also ==
- List of Ultras of the United States
- List of volcanoes in the United States
