= Irving Glacier =

Irving Glacier may refer to:

- Irving Glacier (Antarctica)
- Irving Glacier (Oregon), in Cascade Range, Oregon, United States
