= Thayer Glacier =

Glacier in the state of Oregon

- Location within Oregon
- Type: Mountain glacier
- Location: Cascade Range, Deschutes County, Oregon, U.S.
- Coordinates: 44°09′49″N 121°45′50″W
- Length: 1,200 ft (370 m)
- Terminus: Glacial Lake
- Status: Retreating

Thayer Glacier is in the U.S. state of Oregon. The glacier is situated in the Cascade Range at an elevation of over 8,000 feet (2,400 m). It is on the east slopes of North Sister, an extinct shield volcano.

In August 2020 the Oregon Glaciers Institute reported that Thayer Glacier no longer has active, moving ice.

== See also ==
- List of glaciers in the United States
