= Lewis Glacier (Oregon) =

Glacier in the state of Oregon

- Location within Oregon
- Type: Mountain glacier
- Location: Cascade Range, Deschutes County, Oregon, U.S.
- Coordinates: 44°05′42″N 121°46′00″W
- Length: 3,000 ft (910 m)
- Terminus: Barren rock
- Status: Retreating

Lewis Glacier is in the U.S. state of Oregon. The glacier is situated in the Cascade Range at an elevation generally above 9,000 feet (2,700 m). Lewis Glacier is on the southeast slopes of South Sister, an inactive stratovolcano. Its last Last Glacial Maximum limit is marked by a prominent moraine at an elevation of 1965m (6445 ft) and its Little Ice Age (1350-1850) limit is marked by a moraine at an elevation of 2375m (7790 ft). The glacier has been in a general state of retreat and the terminus of the glacier was reported in 2005 to be at approximately 2680m (8790 ft). More recent imagery posted in 2024 by the Deschutes National Forest appear to show that the glacier is no longer active.

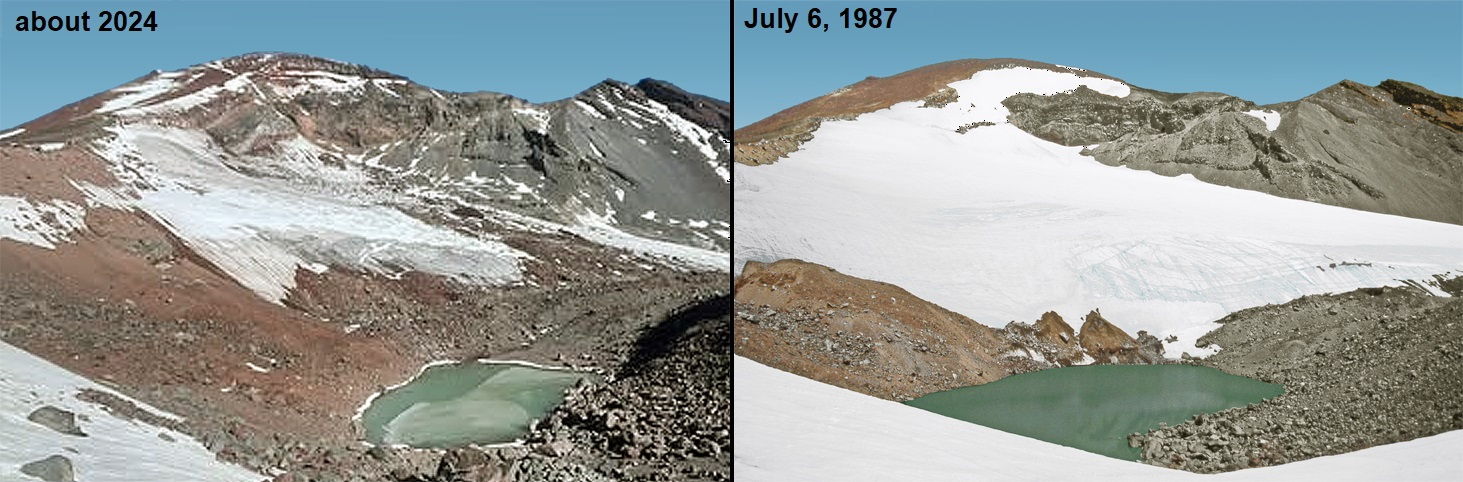
Retreat of the Lewis Glacier 1987 to 2024.

== See also ==
- List of glaciers in the United States
