= Los Chocoyos eruption =

Supervolcano eruption in Central America

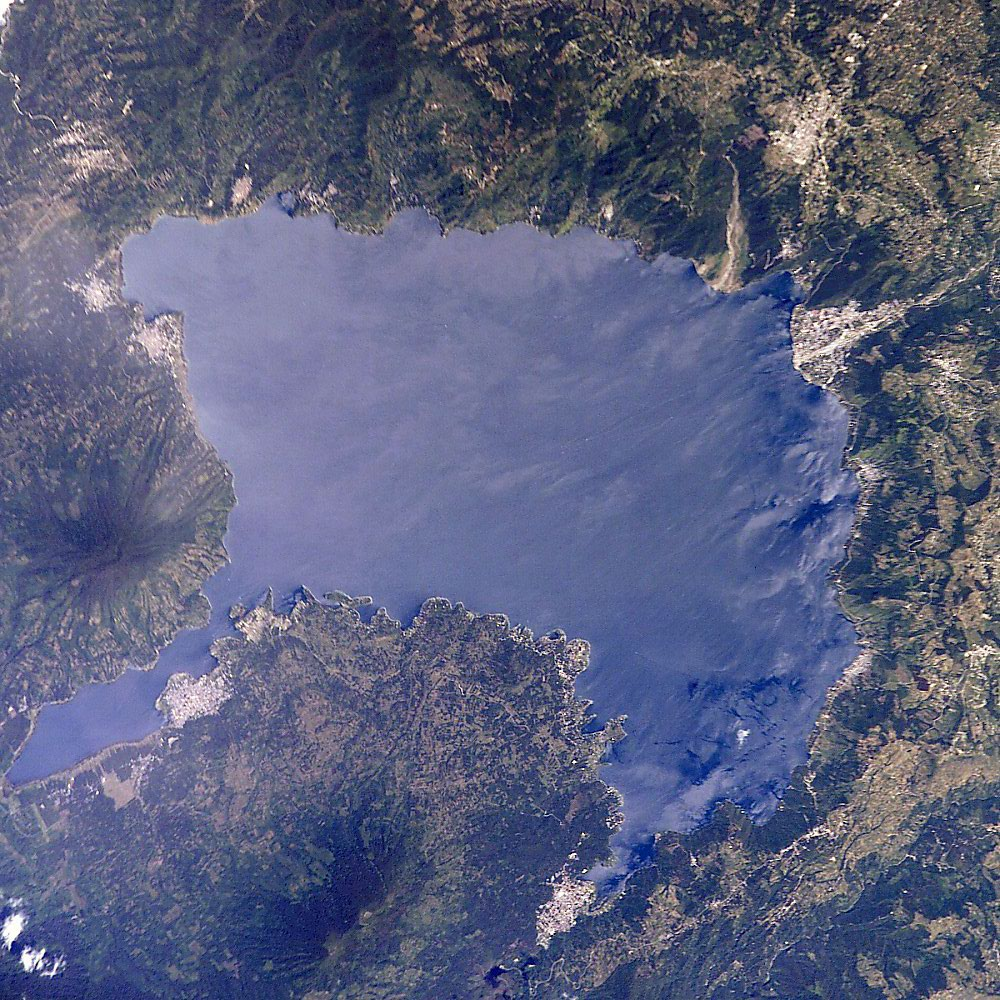
- Lake Atitlan as seen from orbit.
- Volcano: Volcán Atitlán
- Date: 98 – 75 kya
- Type: Ignimbrite-forming
- Location: Guatemala
- VEI: 8
- Impact: Climate disruption (disputed)

The Los Chocoyos eruption was a supervolcanic eruption that occurred sometime between 98,000 and 75,000 years ago, with the younger estimate placing the age close to the Youngest Toba eruption. The eruption consisted of approximately 1,220 cubic kilometres (290 mi^{3}) of rhyolitic ash, with a dense-rock equivalent (DRE) of about 730 cubic kilometres (180 mi^{3}). The eruption is the largest known eruption in Central America and the third, and most recent, caldera forming eruption at Atitlan, with two others known at around 11 mya and 8 mya.

The eruption resulted in voluminous pyroclastic density currents, leaving deposits 6–10 metres (20–33 ft) thick in Chiapas, over 130 kilometres (81 mi) from the source. Ash deposits were found over an area of 6,000,000 km^{2} (2,300,000 mi^{2}). It has been previously postulated that the eruption caused a millennial-scale volcanic winter, although new evidence suggests that is not the case.
