= Mount Multnomah =

Hypothetical ancient volcano in central Oregon, United States

Mount Multnomah is an invalidated hypothetical ancient volcano postulated in a 1925 publication by geologist Edwin T. Hodge. It was proposed to exist in central Oregon at the present day location of the Three Sisters region. It was estimated to have been around 16,000-foot (4,900 m) tall, and was believed destroyed in a fashion similar to Mount Mazama's eruption resulting in what is now Crater Lake in southern Oregon.

In 1924, Hodge performed fieldwork around the area and concluded that the three adjacent volcanoes and their foothills were once part of a single giant volcano. His conclusion was bolstered by oral history from the local Warm Springs tribe, which recounted the massive eruption and collapse of the ancient peak:

Klah Klahnee, the Three Sisters, was once the biggest and highest mountain of all; it could be seen for many miles. One time the earth shook for days, and the mountain boiled inside. It boiled over, and hot rocks came out of the top of it. Flames and smoke rose high in the air. Red hot stones were thrown out in every direction. Many villages and many Indians were buried by the rocks. When the mountain became quiet again, most of it was gone. Only three points were left.

The date of eruption that Hodge calculated using the potassium-argon method was 25 million to 27 million years ago. This predates the earliest estimates of human presence in North America (see Settlement of the Americas) and even the earliest known humans (see Archaic Homo sapiens) by millions of years.

Years later, Howel Williams, then dean of Cascade volcanologists, concluded that each of the Three Sisters and their surrounding mountains were unique and did not represent remains of a single collapsed structure.

== See also ==
- Supervolcano
