= Prouty Glacier =

Glacier in Oregon, United States

- Location within Oregon
- Type: Mountain glacier
- Location: Cascade Range, Deschutes County, Oregon, U.S.
- Coordinates: 44°06′24″N 121°45′33″W
- Length: 2,300 ft (700 m)
- Terminus: Barren rock/Talus
- Status: Retreating

Prouty Glacier is located in the U.S. state of Oregon. The glacier is situated in the Cascade Range at an elevation generally between 9,500 and 8,500 feet (2,900 and 2,600 m). Prouty Glacier is on the northeast slopes of South Sister, a dormant stratovolcano. Beyond the current range of the glacier, glacially formed Carver Lake lies to the immediate northeast of Prouty Glacier and is impounded by the old terminal moraine of the glacier.

== See also ==
- List of glaciers in the United States
