= Linn Glacier =

Glacier in Oregon, United States

- Location within Oregon
- Type: Mountain glacier
- Location: Cascade Range, Deschutes County, Oregon, U.S.
- Coordinates: 44°10′30″N 121°46′29″W
- Length: 800 ft (240 m)
- Terminus: Rockfall
- Status: Retreating

Linn Glacier is in the U.S. state of Oregon. The glacier is situated in the Cascade Range at an elevation between 9,000 and 8,000 feet (2,700 and 2,400 m), on the north slope of North Sister, an extinct shield volcano.

== See also ==
- List of glaciers in the United States
