= Carver Glacier =

Glacier in Oregon, United States

- Location within Oregon
- Type: Mountain glacier
- Location: Cascade Range, Deschutes County, Oregon, U.S.
- Coordinates: 44°07′25″N 121°46′01″W
- Length: 1,000 ft (300 m)
- Terminus: Barren rock/Talus
- Status: Retreating

Carver Glacier is in the U.S. state of Oregon. The glacier is situated in the Cascade Range at an elevation near 7,500 feet (2,300 m), just east of Skinner Glacier. Carver Glacier is on the north slopes of South Sister, a dormant stratovolcano.

== See also ==
- List of glaciers in the United States
