= Clark Glacier (Oregon) =

Glacier in Oregon, United States

- Location within Oregon
- Type: Mountain glacier
- Location: Cascade Range, Lane County, Oregon, U.S.
- Coordinates: 44°05′43″N 121°46′39″W
- Terminus: Barren rock
- Status: Retreating

Clark Glacier is in the U.S. state of Oregon. The glacier is situated in the Cascade Range at an elevation around 9,000 feet (2,700 m). Clark Glacier is just to the southwest of South Sister, a dormant stratovolcano.

In 2020, the Oregon Glaciers Institute declared Clark Glacier dead.

== See also ==
- List of glaciers in the United States
