= Flat Landing Brook Formation =

Geological formation in Northern New Brunswick, Canada

- Stratigraphic range: Darriwilian, 466–465 Ma
- Type: Geological formation
- Unit of: Tetagouche Group
- Sub-units: Reids Brook Member, Forty Mile Brook Member, Roger Brook Member, Moody Brook Member
- Underlies: Little River Formation
- Overlies: Nepisiguit Falls Formation
- Thickness: Unknown

Lithology
- Primary: Rhyolite flows, hyaloclastics, breccias, hyalotuffs
- Other: Shale, greywacke, siltstone, iron formation, tholeiitic basalt, alkali basalt

Location
- Region: New Brunswick
- Country: Canada

Type section
- Named for: Flat Landing Brook
- Named by: R.W. Sullivan, 1990; C.R. van Staal et al., 1990

The Flat Landing Brook Formation is a geological formation in Gloucester County of northern New Brunswick, Canada. It consists mostly of volcanic rocks that were deposited 466 to 465 million years ago during the Darriwilian stage of the Middle Ordovician epoch.

== Lithology ==
Rhyolite flows, breccias and hyaloclastics are the primary rocks comprising the Flat Landing Brook Formation. Locally abundant rocks include tholeiitic to transitional mafic fragmental rocks and massive flows, as well as felsic tuffs, tholeiitic pillow basalts and minor porphyritic felsic flows. Siltstone, greywacke, iron formation, ferromanganiferous shale and chert represent minor rocks.

== Stratigraphy ==
=== Relationship to other units ===
The Flat Landing Brook Formation is the middle member of the Tetagouche Group. Exposures between Route 490 and the headwaters of Flat Landing Brook are the type locality. It is conformably overlain by massive pillowed alkali basalt of the Little River Formation and conformably underlain by crystal tuff as well as quartz-feldspar augen schist of the Nepisiguit Falls Formation. The contact of the Flat Landing Brook and Little River formations is exposed in the Brunswick Mines area and near California Lake whereas the contact of the Flat Landing Brook and Nepisiguit Falls formations is exposed along The Narrows of the Nepisiguit River.

=== Subdivisions ===
The Flat Landing Brook Formation contains four named subdivisions:

Member	Age	Lithology	Reference
Reids Brook Member	Middle Ordovician	Rhyolite flows, hyaloclastites, breccias	
Forty Mile Brook Member	Middle Ordovician	Tholeiitic pillow basalt	
Roger Brook Member	Middle Ordovician	Tuff and minor porphyritic felsic flows	
Moody Brook Member	Middle Ordovician	Tholeiitic to transitional mafic fragmental rocks and massive flows	

== Volcanology ==
With an estimated original volume of approximately 12,000 km^{3} (2,900 cu mi), the Flat Landing Brook Formation incorporates the eruptive products of a supervolcano similar in size and eruption rates to the Taupō and Yellowstone calderas. It may also represent the largest supervolcanic eruption of the Paleozoic era. Most of the volcanic rocks were laid down during a timespan of possibly less than two million years. A region of coarse co-ignimbritic breccias in the Flat Landing Brook Formation (Grants Lake pyroclastics) is interpreted to represent the infill of a large caldera with a radius of about 80 km (50 mi). The only rocks that do not seem to be related to the caldera are scattered dikes and small effusive flows of the Taylor Brook rhyolites, the latter of which probably issued from parasitic vents on the outer margins of the caldera.

== See also ==
- List of volcanoes in Canada
- Volcanism of Eastern Canada
