= Hayden Glacier =

Glacier in the state of Oregon

- Location within Oregon
- Type: Mountain glacier
- Location: Cascade Range, Deschutes County, Oregon, U.S.
- Coordinates: 44°09′01″N 121°46′34″W
- Length: 4,400 ft (1,300 m)
- Terminus: Barren rock/Talus
- Status: Retreating

Hayden Glacier is located in the US state of Oregon. The glacier is situated in the Cascade Range at an elevation between 8,800 and 7,800 feet (2,700 and 2,400 m). It is to the northeast of Middle Sister and south of North Sister, both of which are extinct volcanoes.

== See also ==
- List of glaciers in the United States
