= Skinner Glacier (Oregon) =

Glacier in the state of Oregon

- Location within Oregon
- Type: Mountain glacier
- Location: Cascade Range, Lane County, Oregon, U.S.
- Coordinates: 44°06′59″N 121°46′23″W
- Length: 1,000 ft (300 m)
- Terminus: Barren rock/Talus
- Status: Retreating

Skinner Glacier is in the U.S. state of Oregon. The glacier is situated in the Cascade Range at an elevation near 8,000 feet (2,400 m), just west of Carver Glacier. Skinner Glacier is on the north slopes of South Sister, a dormant stratovolcano.

== See also ==
- List of glaciers in the United States
