= Renfrew Glacier =

Glacier in the state of Oregon

- Location within Oregon
- Type: Mountain glacier
- Location: Cascade Range, Lane County, Oregon, U.S.
- Coordinates: 44°09′18″N 121°47′32″W
- Length: 2,800 ft (850 m)
- Terminus: Moraines
- Status: Retreating

Renfrew Glacier is in the U.S. state of Oregon. The glacier is situated in the Cascade Range at an elevation generally above 8,000 feet (2,400 m). Renfrew Glacier is on the northwest slopes of Middle Sister, an extinct stratovolcano.

== See also ==
- List of glaciers in the United States
