= Diller Glacier =

Glacier in Oregon, United States

- Location within Oregon
- Type: Mountain glacier
- Location: Cascade Range, Deschutes County, Oregon, U.S.
- Coordinates: 44°08′35″N 121°46′26″W
- Length: 4,300 ft (1,300 m)
- Terminus: Barren rock/Talus
- Status: Retreating

Diller Glacier is located in the U.S. state of Oregon. The glacier is situated in the Cascade Range at an elevation average of 9,000 feet (2,700 m) and is on the southeast slopes of Middle Sister, an extinct stratovolcano.

== See also ==
- List of glaciers in the United States
