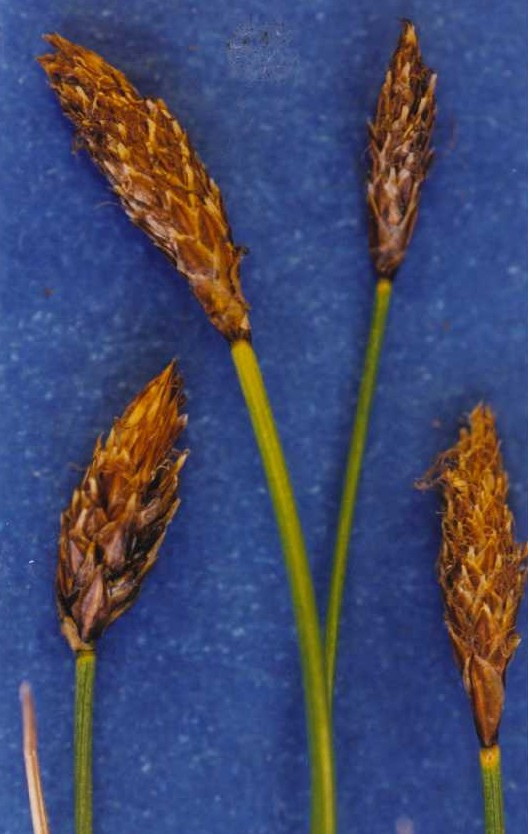

Scientific classification
- Kingdom: Plantae
- Clade: Tracheophytes
- Clade: Angiosperms
- Clade: Monocots
- Clade: Commelinids
- Order: Poales
- Family: Cyperaceae
- Genus: Carex
- Species: C. subnigricans

Binomial name
- Carex subnigricans Stacey

Synonyms
- Carex rachillis

= Carex subnigricans =

Species of grass-like plant

Carex subnigricans is a species of sedge known by the common name nearlyblack sedge.

== Distribution ==
This sedge is native to the western United States from California to Wyoming, where it grows in moist and dry mountain habitat above 2,500 metres (8,200 ft) in elevation in sub-alpine and alpine flora zones, such as in the High Sierra Nevada.

== Description ==
Carex subnigricans produces stems no taller than about 20 centimeters from a network of thin rhizomes. The thin leaves are rolled tightly and resemble quills. The inflorescence is generally oval and pointed in shape and one or two centimeters long.
