= Irving Glacier (Oregon) =

Glacier in the state of Oregon

- Location within Oregon
- Type: Mountain glacier
- Location: Cascade Range, Lane County, Oregon, US
- Coordinates: 44°08′02″N 121°46′40″W
- Length: 1,000 ft (300 m)
- Terminus: Barren rock/Talus
- Status: Retreating

Irving Glacier is located in the US state of Oregon. The glacier is situated in the Cascade Range at an elevation near 7,500 feet (2,300 m) and is on the south slopes of Middle Sister, an extinct stratovolcano.

== See also ==
- List of glaciers in the United States
