= Lost Creek Glacier =

Glacier in Oregon, United States

- Location within Oregon
- Type: Mountain glacier
- Location: Cascade Range, Lane County, Oregon, U.S.
- Coordinates: 44°06′27″N 121°47′01″W
- Length: 2,500 ft (760 m)
- Terminus: Barren rock
- Status: Retreating

Lost Creek Glacier is in the U.S. state of Oregon. The glacier is situated in the Cascade Range at an elevation generally above 9,000 feet (2,700 m). Lost Creek Glacier is on the northwest slopes of South Sister, a dormant stratovolcano.

== See also ==
- List of glaciers in the United States
