= Howel Williams =

American volcanologist (1898–1980)

- Born: October 12, 1898; Liverpool, England
- Died: January 12, 1980 (aged 81); Berkeley, California, United States
- Education: Liverpool University
- Scientific career
- Workplaces: University of California

Howel Williams (October 12, 1898 – January 12, 1980) was a British and American geologist and volcanologist.

== Early life ==
He was born of Welsh parents in Liverpool, England, on October 12, 1898. He received a BA in geography in 1923 and an MA in archaeology in 1924 from Liverpool University. He studied geology at the Imperial College of Science and Technology in London. Howel Williams moved to the University of California at Berkeley in 1926. In 1928 he was awarded the degree of D.Sc. from the University of Liverpool and published his first papers on the geology of various California volcanic regions. Williams was a member of the National Academy of Sciences.

== Career ==
He published many studies on the volcanoes of California, but is most noted for his "The Geology of Crater Lake National Park" in which he recognized the nature of the collapse of the crater and extended the work to develop the principles of volcanic caldera formation. He did extensive early work on the geology of Central America (often sketch-mapping from the windows of second-class buses), and of the Galapagos Islands. In Latin America, Williams put to good use his early background in archeology. For instance, he used petrographic techniques to trace the origin of stone used in the giant Olmec sculptures of La Venta, Tabasco Mexico.

Williams was a master of the art of field sketching, formerly practiced by many naturalists. Many of his papers were illustrated with his meticulously done pen and ink drawings. His drawings of the microscopic features of rocks of all types were used exclusively in the very successful textbook, Petrography, by Williams, Turner, and Gilbert.

=== Selected works ===
- GEOLOGY OF THE MARYSVILLE BUTTES CALIFORNIA, California (1929)
- Geology of Tahiti, Moorea, and Maiao, (Bernice P. Bishop museum. Bulletin 105) (1933) 83pp
- Calderas and their origin, University of California Press (1941), 346pp.
- Volcanoes of the Paricutín region, México: U.S. Geological Survey Bulletín 965-B, p. 165–269.
- LANDSCAPES OF ALASKA: THEIR GEOLOGIC EVOLUTION, University of California Press Berkeley (1958)
- Petrography: An introduction to the study of rocks in thin sections, W.H. Freeman (1958), 406pp
- GEOLOGIC RECONNAISSANCE OF SOUTHEASTERN GUATEMALA, University Of California Press (1964)
- Crater Lake: The story of its origin, University of California Press (1963)
- The history and character of volcanic domes, Johnson Reprint (1966)
- The Sutter Buttes of California: A Study of Plio-Pleistocene Volcanism, University of California Press; New Ed edition (March 7, 1979), 80pp

== Family ==
His twin brother David Williams also became a geologist.

== References and sources ==
Sources

- Alexander R. McBirney, Rock Stars: The Father of Modern Volcanology: Howel Williams (1898–1980), GSA TODAY, August 2000
- Howel Williams (1898-1980), In Memoriam written by A. Pabst, I. S. E. Carmichael, L. Constance, and G. H. Curtis, Earth & Planetary Science, University of California, Berkeley
