= Tasman Abyssal Plain =

Ocean depression southeast of Australia

Tasman Abyssal Plain Eastern Australian Abyss
- Bathymetric depression
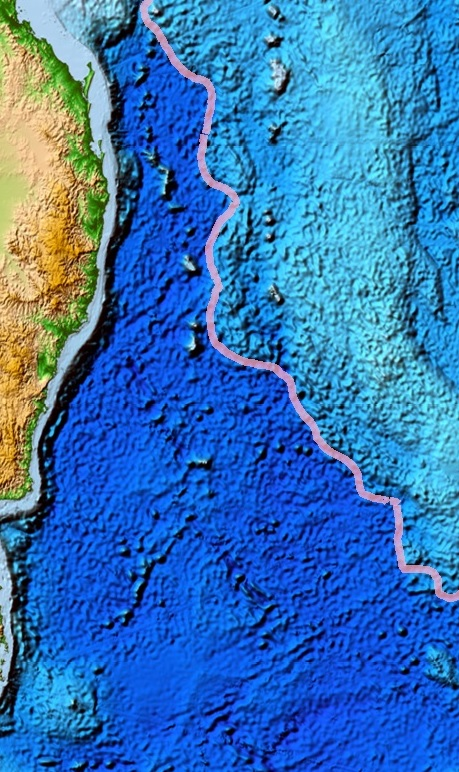
- The Tasman Abyssal Plain sits between Australia and Zealandia
- Interactive map of Tasman Abyssal Plain
- Location: Off the coast of southeast Australia
- Part of: Tasman Sea
- Age: 90–52 million years ago
- Formed by: Tectonic breaking of Australian and Zealandia

Area
  - Total: 1,101,881.18 km^{2} (425,438.70 sq mi)

Dimensions
  - Length: 2,079 km^{2} (803 sq mi)
  - Width: 1,065 km^{2} (411 sq mi)
  - Depth: 5,943 m (19,498 ft)

The Tasman Abyssal Plain, or the Eastern Australian Abyss, is an abyssal plain located off the coast of southeast Australia in the Tasman Sea. Extending from southern Queensland to Tasmania, the large submarine plain is distinguished by its delicately sloping terrain and abundant marine biodiversity. The plain's deep sea floor is notable for its important sedimentary deposits and exceptional geological formations, whereby showcasing the earth's physical history. Also known as the East Australian Basin and Tasman Basin, it is characterized by an average depth between 4,000 m (13,000 ft) and 5,000 m (16,000 ft), with a diverse, though scarcely-explored, ecosystem.

A world-first observation of the largely-unexplored abyssal plain took place in 2017, where it created high quality seafloor mapping of Australia's continental edge from southern Queensland to Tasmania. The sonar observation revealed that the continental slope to the eastern Australian abyss was more convoluted and craggy than expected, with the edge being engraved by multiple canyons, sediment slumps, precipices and many areas of exposed rock. The majority of abyssal species discovered have extensive geographic and bathymetric distributions. Polychaetes, which are marine worms, were the leading members of the deep-sea macrobenthos, and therefore were valuable organisms for zoogeographical studies.

== Geology ==
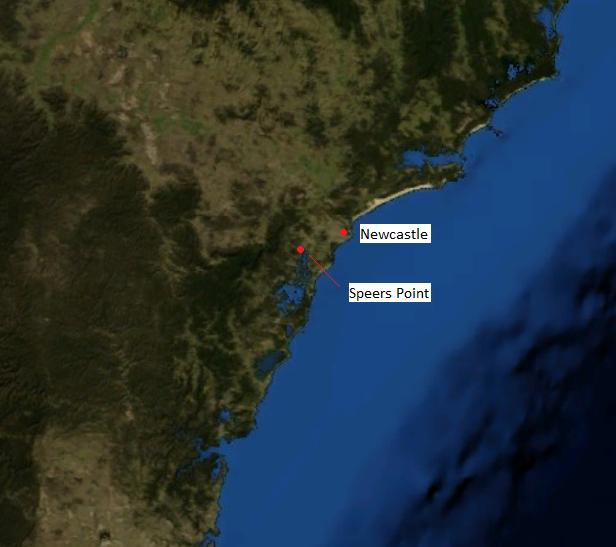
The continental shelf of southeastern Australia, descending to the Tasman Abyssal Plain (dark blue)

The eastern Australian abyss was formed around 90–52 million years ago during the tectonic breaking of Australian and New Zealand continental masses. A south-north expanding ridge previously existed at the plain's centre. Thereafter, the north–south string of Tasmantid seamounts were formed along the Lord Howe Rise by the Australian plate shifting over a crustal centre from 33.5 to 6.4 million years ago. The current basement depths and the sediment thickness hint a Cretaceous age. Today, the abyssal plain stretches from the Chesterfield and Marion plateaus near Queensland's coastal areas, in the north, (at 24°S), to Tasmania's south (48°S), before heading into the Southern Ocean.

The upper continental slope off eastern Australia is largely arched from the shelf break down to 1,500 m (4,900 ft). At mid slope depths, around 3,000 m (9,800 ft), it is more indented, with the higher section occasionally forming an escarpment. Finally, on the lower slope, a series of tread-like rocky racks can be found down to the abyssal plain 4,500 m (14,800 ft) to 5,000 m (16,000 ft). The periphery is repeatedly divided by canyons, some of which begin at shelf depths and depressions due to failing of the incline. The International Ocean Discovery Program had a site located 945 km (587 mi) east of Australia, a site that was on an oceanic crust of Late Cretaceous that was formed 74–83 million years ago. Local seismic reflection data indicate a thick series of sediments, around 800 m (2,600 ft), that are deformed by reverse faults and folds.

The basin has an average maximum depth of approximately 5,000 m (16,000 ft), although several smaller depressions extend deeper, with the greatest recorded depth of 5,943 m (19,498 ft) located just northwest of Sydney. At the southern end of the eastern Australian abyss, the basin is bounded by the Indo-Antarctic Ridge, where depths are generally less than 3,500 m (11,500 ft), limiting the northward movement of deep Antarctic waters. To the north, the eastern Australian abyss is connected to the Coral Sea by a ridge with depths generally shallower than 3,000 m (9,800 ft). The eastern Australian continental shelf is comparatively narrow compared with the rest of the continent, since the shelf breaks just 15 km (9.3 mi) away from the coast, where the beginning of the abyssal plain may be as proximate as 60 km (37 mi) from the coast. Geomorphological features in the eastern margin include plateaus, basins, terraces, holes, and submarine canyons, with one prominent example being Bass Canyon.

== Oceanography ==
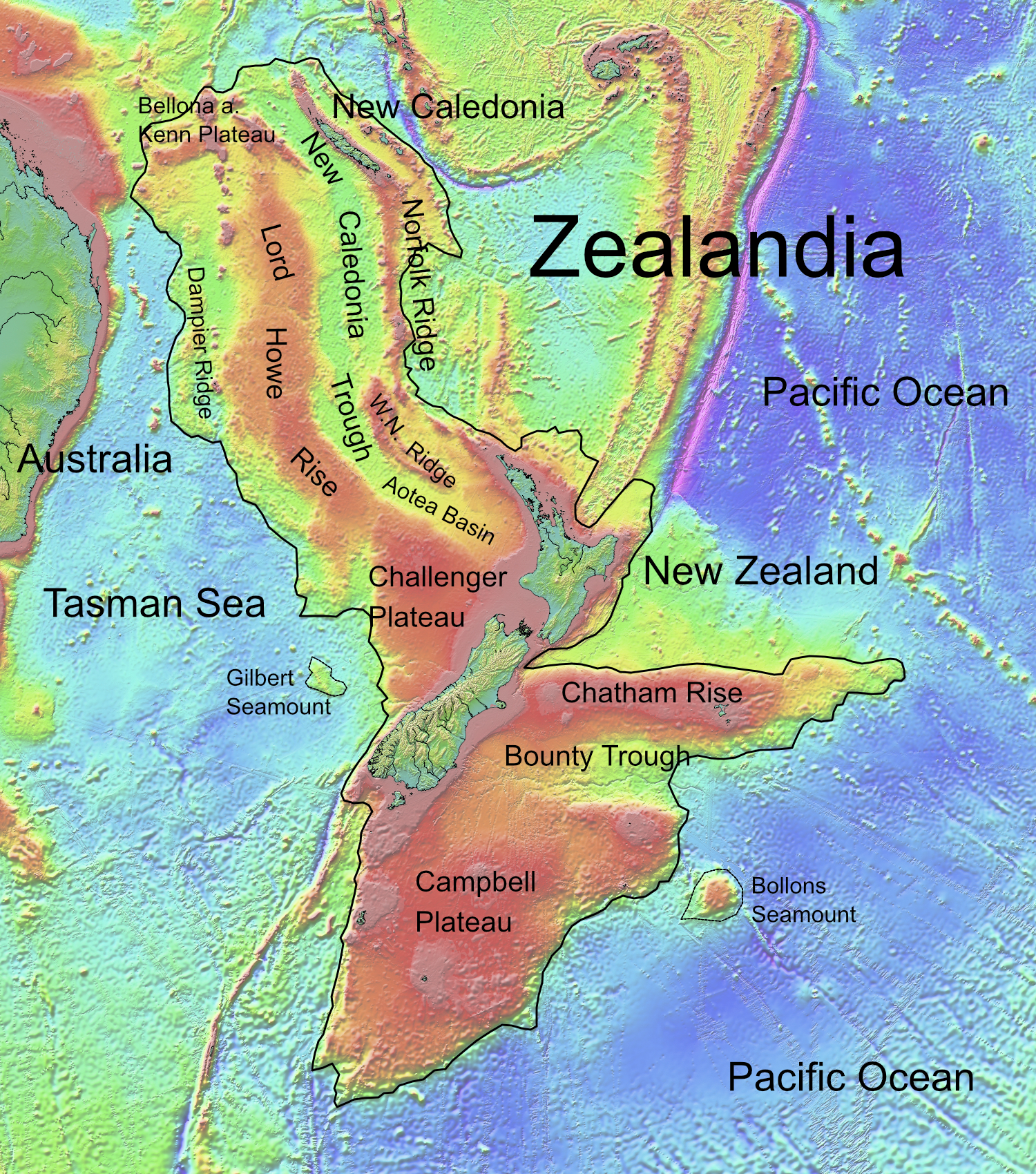
The Tasman Abyssal Plain (centre-left) being bounded by Lord Howe Rise, Challenger Plateau and Australia.

There is poor knowledge about the benthic fauna at the lower bathyal to abyssal depths, around 2,000 m (6,600 ft), despite the Tasman plain's large size. The North Atlantic Deep Water (NADW) at 2,500 m (8,200 ft) and Antarctic Bottom Water (ABW), around 5,000 m (16,000 ft), flow in from the southwest near the Australian perimeter, where they form clockwise eddies at the northern part of the Tasman basin, with a southern flow to the Lord Howe Rise. This northward flow of the deep currents is powerful enough to eradicate sediment from the lower slope of Australia's continental shelf, thereby leaving a rocky surface. At 4,000 m (13,000 ft), the plain is relatively cold at 1.1 °C (34 °F), salty (34.72%) and oxygenized (4.49 ml/l). At 1,000 m (3,300 ft), it gets warmer at 5.0 °C (41 °F), and is somewhat less salty (34.47) and less oxygenated (4.06). The sea itself lacks hypoxic (O₂ < 1.7 ml/L) or anoxic (O₂ < 0.02 ml/L) oxygen minimum zones.

Sediments amass on the upper slope, which are well oxygenated, and at times on even surfaces at the intermediate and lower slope depths where ocean floor currents light, with the composition of the sediments being dependent on depth. Biogenic carbonate and siliceous land deposits are found on the shelf and upper slope. Pelagic-derived sediments (primarily coccolith and foraminifera remnants) are found on the lower gradient and abyssal plain. Beneath the lysocline at 3,600 m (11,800 ft), carbonate particles begin to disintegrate and sediments start to form a fine ooze.

Vertical electric field wavering occur naturally in the plain off the coast of eastern Australia, on the floor of the Tasman Abyssal Plain at depths of 4,836 m (15,866 ft), with record returned being 107 days in duration. The data acquired is clarified in conditions of east–west fluid current motion past the wire, which causes electromagnetic initiation with the horizontal north portion of the earth's stable magnetic field. Irregular motions on day time scales are credited to mesoscale activity in the East Australian Current method.

Current and temperature measurements on the Tasman Sea Plain are equated with near-surface observations of the East Australian Current (EAC) System to determine the degree to which the deep and near-surface flows are related. Strong flow is primarily restricted to regions of sharp potential vorticity gradients such as the continental rise, while flow over the abyssal plain is usually much weaker. Moreover, eddies over the continental rise are more productive at producing longer waves which can promulgate large distance along geostrophic contours.

== Fauna ==
In 1874, the H.M.S. Challenger (UK) brought one biological dredge specimen at a depth of 4,754 m (15,597 ft). The Galathea voyage (from Denmark) then collected from eight abyssal stations through the Tasman Sea in 1951–2. The RV Dmitry Mendeleev (U.S.S.R.) towed two abyssal samples from the Plain as it was crossing Southern Australia and Norfolk Island in 1975–1976. Lastly, in 1982, the RV Tangaroa (New Zealand) collected biological matter at the abyssal plain whilst looking for manganese nodules on a cross section between New Zealand and the city of Sydney, Australia. Just three of those samples eventuated within the Exclusive economic zone of Australia (EEZ). In 2017, on studying how marine life spread along the Australian east coast, the RV Investigator collected over 200 annelids of the family Serpulidae, in addition to 42,747 fish and invertebrate specimens from depths of up to 4,800 m (15,700 ft), 10% being new records for Australia and 5% new to science. Furthermore, a total of 2357 polychaete specimens from 33 families and 114 species were reported. The abyssal fauna assembled was very similar to those from the Antarctic and deep tropical waters, demonstrating a clear relationship through the deep chilly waters.

Widespread latitudinal faunal belts have been recognized in both shallow water and bathyal species from Australia to the eastern Antarctica, where wildlife along the eastern Australian coast is split into tropical and temperate species.Scarce fauna samples were collected from lower bathyal and abyssal ocean floor within the last 150 years. The areas included were the benthic communities at depths of 2,500 m (8,200 ft) and 4,000 m (13,000 ft) by the lower gradient and pit of Australia's eastern perimeter from Tasmania's northeast (42°S) to the Coral Sea (23°S). Sampling included beam trawls, Brenke sleds, box cores, surface meso-zooplankton tows, and seep-rowed camera transects. As a result, 25,710 specimens have been designated to 1084 taxonomic units, including 847 species. Though only 457 were given species names, indicating that upwards to 58% of the assembled fauna is not yet identified. Half of the species collected were abyssal and the other half were limited to the lower areas of the continental slope. Out of more than 100 fish species brought up, over two-thirds were bottom-affiliated benthic species, with the remaining third being pelagic types. Incidentally, during the 2017 expedition, scientists also found a perturbing amount of trash at the depths of 4 km (2.5 mi), which included old bottles, cables, ropes, plastic and charred coal residue.

=== Taxonomy and species diversity ===
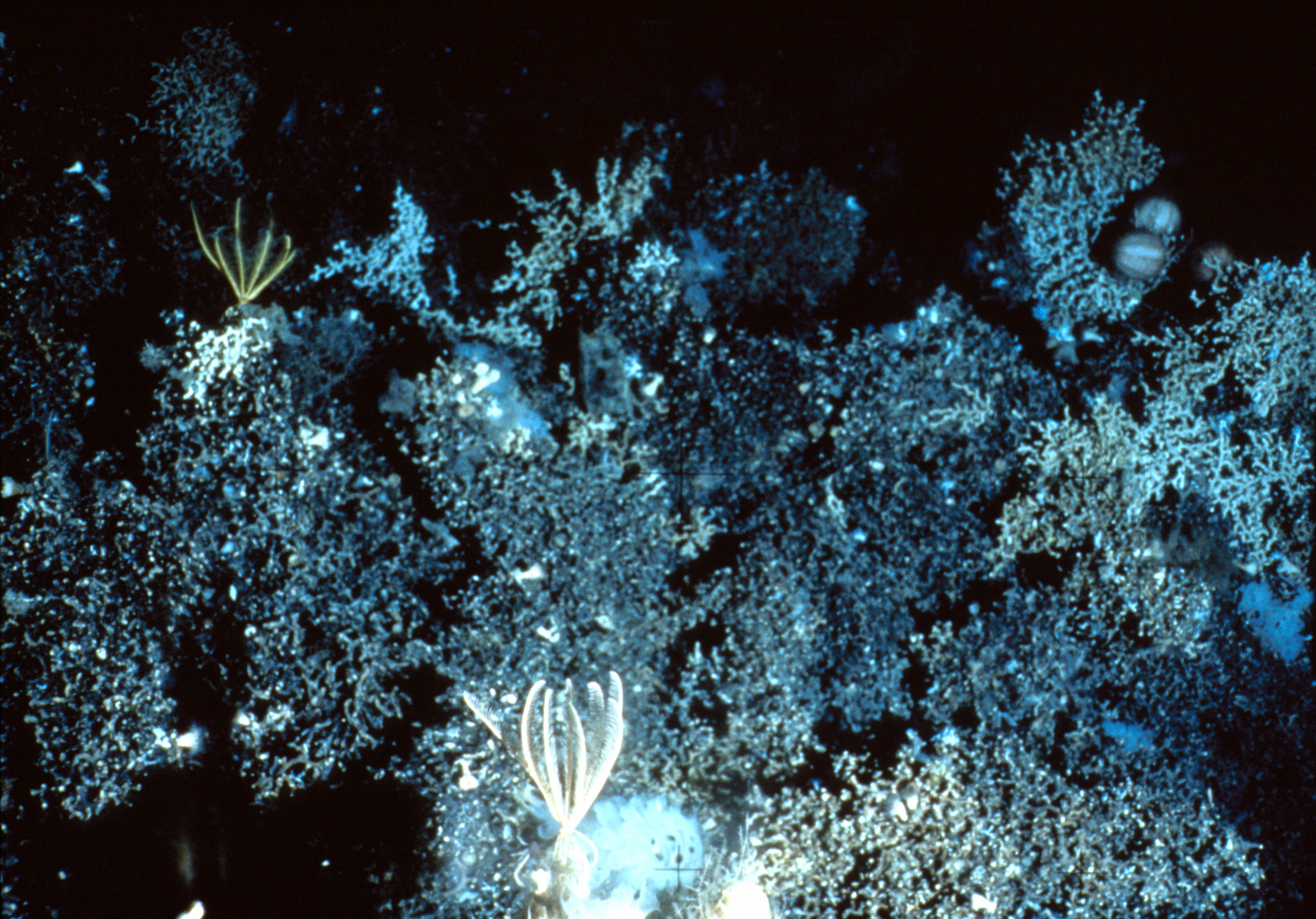
A seamount reef at 1,000 m (3,300 ft) on the continental slope south of Tasmania showing corals, sea urchins and a brittle star.

The abyssal fauna consisted of Nematocarcinidae (25%), Crangonidae (20%), Benthesicymidae (17%), Munidopsidae (16%), Acanthephyridae (10%) and Aristeidae (4%). Considerably small amounts of polychelids and sergestids were registered at abyssal depths (as they were all predominant in the bathyal zone). Having a cosmopolitan spread, the most common abyssal sea pen was Umbellula, which represented about a third of the aggregation, whereas Asajirus and Culeolus were the most frequently collected ascidians. Over 120 Porifera specimens have been collected, a half being the Demospongiae class and the other half being Hexactinellida. Of the Demospongiae, there were four orders that represented the four families of Cladorhizidae, Polymastiidae, Ancorinidae and Niphatidae. The Cladorhizidae, which are carnivorous sponges, were the most frequently collected family with over 40 samples. A new species in the Oweniidae family was recorded from the deep waters, which was found off the coast of New South Wales.

About 50 new species of marine worm were found in the eastern Australian abyss, which include those in the families of Maldanidae and Nothria. Snailfishes and Eelpouts inhabited the slopes of seamounts just over the abyssal plain. Histiobranchus australis and deep sea fishes such as bathysaurus ferox, zombie worms, red coffinfish, faceless fish, shortarse feelerfish, blobfish, spiderfish and tripodfish were found at the abyssal depths. Spectrunculus grandis in such depths were rather small in size. Moreover, some classes like the brachyurans and pagurids were not documented in any of the abyssal specimens. The abyssal creatures 3,500 m (11,500 ft) were very similar to those in the North Atlantic Ocean, which included Ophiura, and Amphiura sp., among others. Acrocirridae and Ampharetidae were recorded in the abyssal depths.

Most noteworthy was the discovery of 17 new species of the carnivorous sponges: Abyssocladia, Asbestopluma, Euchelipluma, Lycopodina, Chondrocladia and Cladorhiza, indicating the high range of sponges on abyssal plains and continental slopes that are still to be completely reported. Abyssal hydroids reported from Challenger Station 160 at the depths of 4,755 m (15,600 ft) were formerly the only published records of the abyssal hydroid wildlife in Australia. Cryptolarella abyssicola was most bountiful species with 12 records. Zygophylax concinna was found from the only known observing found near Sydney and to depths that range from 100 m (330 ft) to 3,754 m (12,316 ft), and as well as the prevalent abyssal brittlestar Amphiophiura bullata. A few Hormathiidae specimens from the abyssal depths were not able to be designated into a genus at the time.

== See also ==
- List of submarine topographical features
- South Tasman Rise
- Joseph Gilbert Seamount
- East Tasman Plateau
