= East Tasman Plateau =

Submerged microcontinent south east of Tasmania

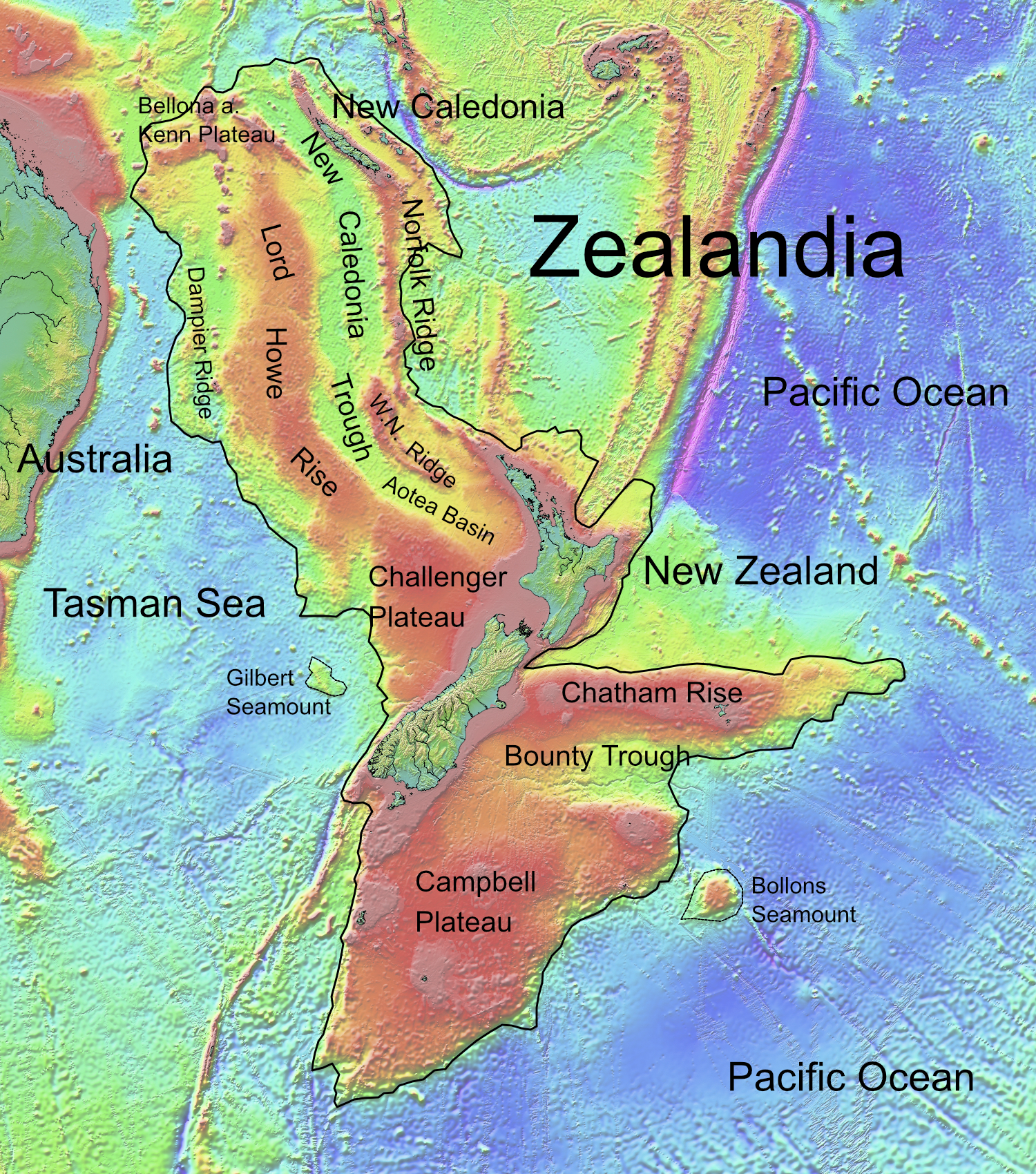
Topographic map of Zealandia that includes the East Tasman Plateau and Cascade Seamount southeast of Tasmania at the far left on the map, just south of the latitude of the Gilbert Seamount which is labelled on the map

The East Tasman Plateau is a submerged microcontinent south east of Tasmania. Its area is 50,000 square kilometres (19,000 sq mi), and it is mostly from 2,500 to 3,000 metres (8,200 to 9,800 ft) deep. It is a circular piece of continental rocks surrounded by oceanic crust. Volcanism occurred there 36 million years ago. The East Tasman Plateau is separated from the island of Tasmania by 100 kilometres (62 mi) of deeper water, and the East Tasman Saddle is a higher ridge connecting the plateau to the Freycinet Peninsula region of the Tasmanian East Coast. This ridge runs north west from the plateau. South-west of the plateau is the L'Atalante Depression. The East Tasman Plateau represents a continental fragment.

== Tectonics ==
Prior to tectonic rifting, the East Tasman Plateau microcontinent was attached to the southeast of Tasmania and the north east of the South Tasman Rise. To the northeast, east and south east of the plateau was the Lord Howe Rise. In the Cretaceous period, the continental breakup of Gondwana started near Tasmania. About 83 million years ago a rift entered the east coast of Tasmania from the south and split off the Lord Howe Rise from the South Tasman Rise to the west. Sea floor spreading continued to move this continental sliver away to the east from Tasmania and Australia, and the rift jumped into the Lord Howe Rise and separated off the East Tasman Plateau. The detachment of the East Tasman Plateau from the Lord Howe Rise has left a large gulf on the west side of the Lord Howe Rise around 38°S 162°E where it used to be.

In the late Cretaceous the East Tasman Plateau was at 65°S and it moved north to 60°S in early Oligocene.

== Geology ==
The geology of the East Tasman Plateau includes early hard continental type rocks, volcanic rocks which are part of sea mounts, and marine sediments deposited since it was below sea level.

The earliest continental East Tasman Plateau rocks that have been brought to the surface of the sea are of Neoproterozoic age, and include gneiss, rhyolite, quartzite, sandstone, ferricrete, and metamorphosed sediments.

The eastern edge of the plateau facing the Tasman Basin is steep, dropping more than 1,000 metres (3,300 ft) and composed of granite.

Sediments on the East Tasman Plateau start with silty clay from Maastrichtian to Eocene. These were deposited in shallow sea water. The microfossils found in these layers include spores, pollen from coniferous forests, and dinocysts. The pollen showed that the climate was humid, with cool winters. From early to mid Eocene, 55 to 37 Ma, the climate on nearby land was uniform, wet and cool and supported angiosperm forests. During the mid Eocene microfossils include diatoms. Above this in the stratigraphic record is glauconite containing siltstone deposited at the end of the Eocene. This material was due to condensed sedimentation due to the added water from the current. During this period around 36 million years ago the plateau started sinking to a depth of 300 metres (980 ft). After this there was a gap in the deposition, due to the opening of the Southern Ocean between the Australian Continent and Antarctica. A seaway carrying the strong Antarctic Circumpolar Current developed. The current eroded part of the surface, and stopped the sediments from the land masses from reaching it. During Oligocene to mid Miocene there were oceanic deposits of clay and calcareous ooze. Microfossils from this time include foraminifers. After this the circumpolar current strengthened and only ooze deposited. The current rate of buildup of ooze on the seabed on the plateau is about 0.01 millimetres (0.00039 in) per year which is quite slow. The sinking has been at the rate of 1 kilometre (0.62 mi) in 10 million years (0.1 mm/year), so the buildup of sediments is not keeping pace with submergence.

After the deposition of sediments, the sediment has been modified by phosphatisation and the formation of ferromanganese crusts.

=== Paleoclimate ===
Carbonate-clumped isotope thermometry uses the carbon-13 and oxygen-18 isotope levels in carbonates to determine the sea temperature. This is in addition to the microfossils, which give a temperature clue as different organisms live in different water temperatures. The sediment cores from the East Tasman Plateau give a history of the temperature of the Southern Ocean and are valuable in seeing the limits of climate change in the future. Water temperature on the Plateau has been as high as 22 °C (72 °F).

== Cascade Seamount ==
The Cascade Seamount is an undersea mountain which has a height from its base higher than those on Tasmania. The peak of Cascade Seamount is currently 598 metres (1,962 ft) deep. The top of the seamount is fairly flat and domed, but once down to 900 m (3,000 ft) deep the sides slope off very steeply. The Cascade Seamount is a volcano formed during the Late Eocene period as a result of the Balleny mantle plume. This volcano has produced volcanic breccia, hyaloclastite and alkali olivine basalt. The extra weight of the seamount isostatically depressed the adjacent plateau to form a basin. The basin filled with up to 1,000 m (3,300 ft) of sediment during Late Eocene, and early Oligocene, and another 500 m (1,600 ft) of calcareous ooze and chalk during late Oligocene. Originally the volcano was more than 400 m (1,300 ft) above sea level. The age is confirmed by foraminifera microfossils Chiloguembelina cubensis, Globigerapsis index, Globigerapsis rubriformis, Subbotina angiporoides and Subbotina linaperta found in the sediment on the volcano. This sediment settled in shallow water.

The Cascade Seamount is part of a chain of volcanic seamounts that extend south to the Balleny Islands near Antarctica.

High frequency echograms show that the top of the seamount is covered in sediment, but that the steep slopes are rocky. There is possibly a debris flow on the east flank.

The name for Cascade Seamount has also been called Cascade Guyot. The feature was discovered in 1944, and appeared on chart BA214 in 1954. It was named after the Cascade Brewery.

== Fauna ==
Above the sea at this location typical Southern Ocean animals are found such as several kinds of whales, albatross and petrels. Species detected include Diomedea exulans, Diomedea royal, Diomedea sanfordi, Euphausia frigida, Fregetta tropica, Limacina retroversa, Oceanites oceanicus, Oithona similis, Pachyptila belcheri, Pachyptila crassirostris, Pachyptila turtur, Pachyptila vittata, Pelagodroma marina, Phoebetria fusca, Phoebetria palpebrata, Procellaria aequinoctialis, Pterodroma cookilaria, Pterodroma lessonii, Pterodroma leucoptera, Pterodroma macroptera, Pterodroma macroptera, Pterodroma mollis, Pterodroma neglecta, Puffinus assimilis, Puffinus tenuirostris, Thalassarche bulleri, Thalassarche cauta, Thalassarche melanophrys, and Thysanoessa macrura.

Molluscs found on the Cascade Seamount include Cuspidaria brazieri (Brazier’s spoon-shell), Cuspidaria erma (noble spoon-shell), Veprichlamys perillustris (shining scallop), Fusitriton magellanicus retiolus (Magellanic rock-whelk), and Sassia kampyla (curved rock-whelk). The deep water sea star Novodinia australis has been found on the Cascade Seamount.

== Extra reading ==
- Fuller, Mike; Yannick Touchard (2004). On the magnetostratigraphy of the East Tasman Plateau Timing of the opening of the Tasmanian Gateway and paleoenvironmental changes. Vol. 151. pp. 63–78. Bibcode:2004GMS...151...63F. doi:10.1029/151GM05. ISBN 978-0-87590-416-0. ISSN 0065-8448.
- Schellenberg, Stephen A.; Henk Brinkhuis; Catherine E. Stickley; Michael Fuller; Frank T. Kyte; Graham L. Williams (2004). The Cretaceous/Paleogene transition on the East Tasman Plateau, southwestern Pacific. Vol. 151. pp. 93–112. Bibcode:2004GMS...151...93S. doi:10.1029/151GM07. ISBN 978-0-87590-416-0. ISSN 0065-8448.
- Dietmar Müller, R.; Carmen Gaina; Walter R. Roest; David Lundbek Hansen (2001). "A recipe for microcontinent formation". Geology. 29 (3): 203. Bibcode:2001Geo....29..203D. doi:10.1130/0091-7613(2001)029<0203:ARFMF>2.0.CO;2. ISSN 0091-7613. explanation of formation
