= New Caledonia Trough =

Oceanic trough between New Caledonia and New Zealand

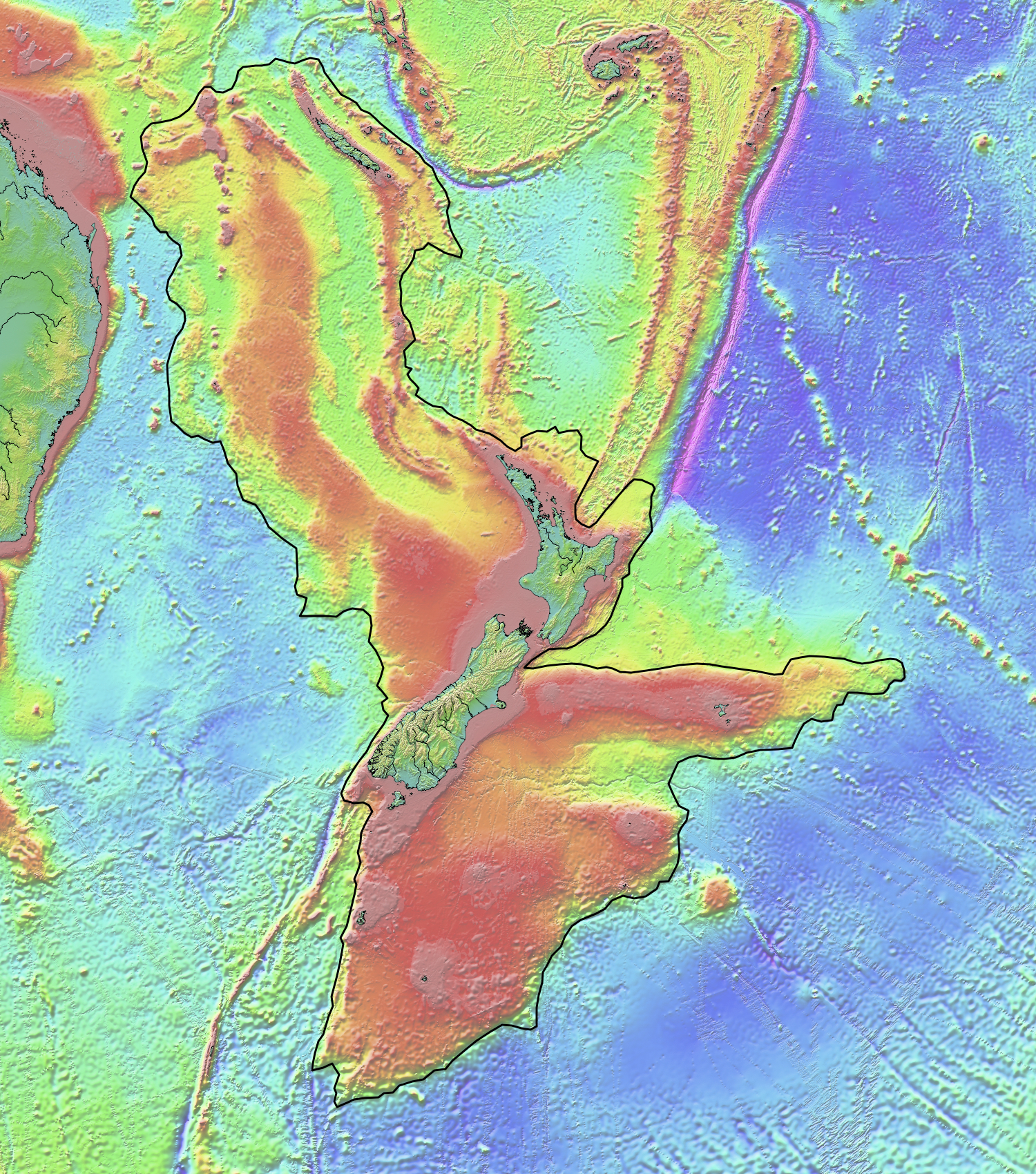
The New Caledonia Trough in relation to other South Pacific Ocean, Coral Sea and Tasman Sea seafloor features. The Zealandia continental margin is shown in black.

The New Caledonia Trough is an ocean floor feature that extends 2,300 km (1,400 mi) from the north of the island of Grande Terre of New Caledonia, to the coast off the Taranaki region of the North Island of New Zealand. Its southern portion includes the Taranaki Basin which has demonstrated oil reserves.

== Geography ==
The trough is 2,300 km (1,400 mi) long and at ocean depths between 1.0 and 3.5 km (0.62 and 2.17 mi) orientated initially under the southern Coral Sea northeast to southwest similar to the alignment of Grande Terre but at the southern end of Grande Terre strikes north–south. At about 33°S the strike turns south-west towards northern Taranaki. These have been termed the northern (18–23°S), central (23–33°S) and southern (33–37°S) sectors. The northern and central portions are often termed the New Caledonia Basin. It extends from 20°0′0″S 162°30′0″E to 37°27′0″S 172°4′59.9″E

A clear distinction between the trough and its constituent basins was only defined in 2012. The eastern boundary of the northern sector is the Fairway Ridge which contain seamounts that start at depths just below sea level at the Lansdowne Bank, but towards the south the ridge structures are 2.9 km (1.8 mi) deep where the adjacent Fairway Basin to the ridges east joins the New Caledonia Basin at its widest. The western margin of the northern sector is initially the northeastern ridge that projects under the Coral Sea from Grande Terre towards the north d'Entrecasteaux Ridge, then the island of Grande Terre, followed by the northern portion of the Norfolk Ridge. The eastern margin of the central sector is the Lord Howe Rise, and the distal southern sector the Challenger Plateau. The western margin of the central sector continues to be the Norfolk Ridge until the West Norfolk Ridge strikes off it at about 31°S. The Fairway Basin opens at its south into the trough and this section has been called the Fairway-Aotea Basin. The southern sector contains the Aotea Basin and then the Taranaki Basin.

=== Names ===
The New Caledonia Trough has also been called the Norfolk Island Trough and the Norfolk Trough.

== Geology ==
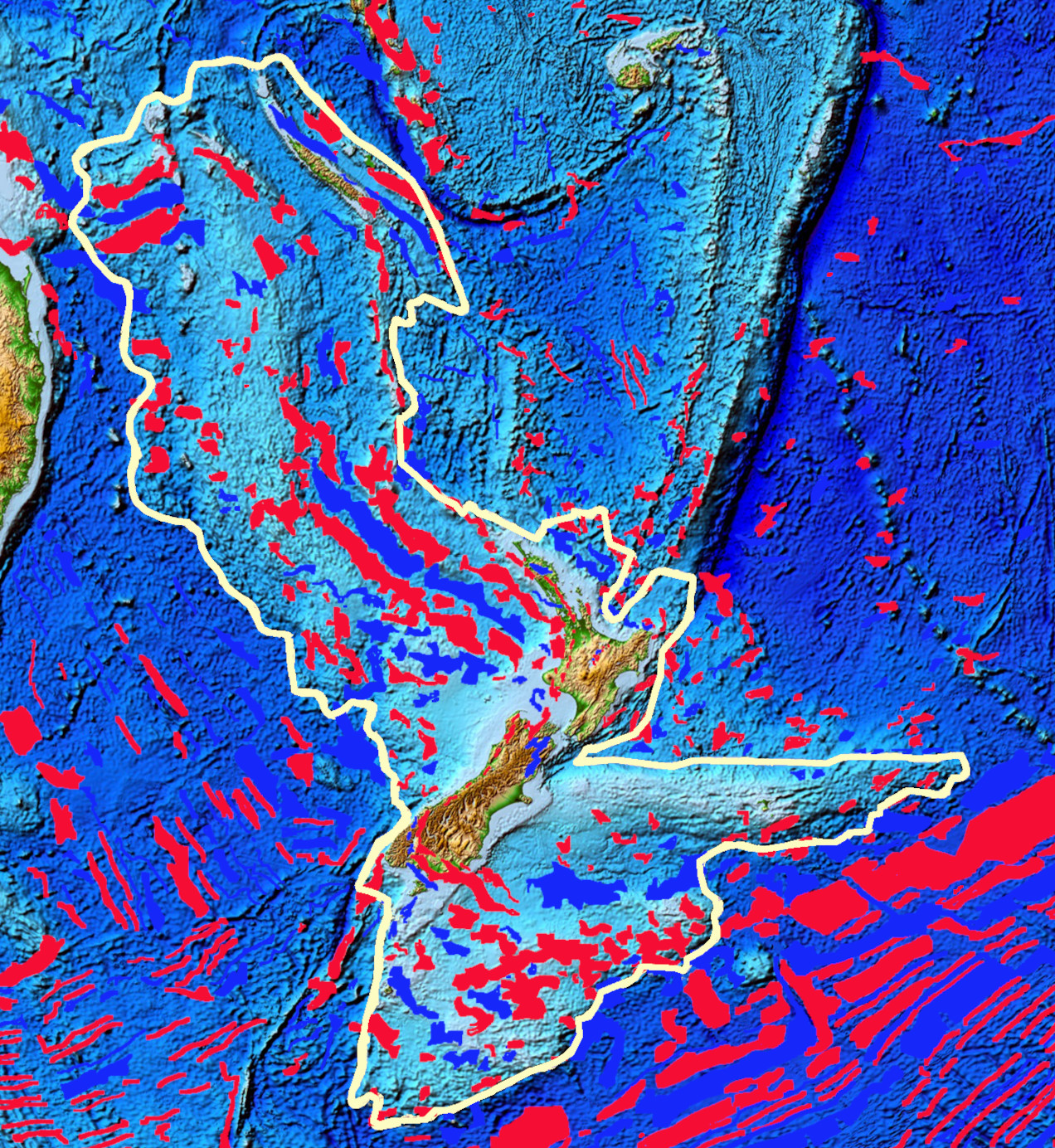
White outline Zealandia. Red more than 100nT magnetic anomaly, Blue less than -100nT magnetic anomaly

The trough is between 200 and 300 km (120 and 190 mi) wide, and traverses a number of sedimentary basins within the submerged continent of Zealandia. This is a geological concept that did not exist before 1995 when the subducted slab capture hypothesis was first applied to the breakup of east Gondwana. The full submergence had taken place by 63.5 – 56 million years ago. The timings and drivers of the formation of the trough have accordingly become the subject of research orientated to test this hypothesis and the Zealandia concept but the more recent tectonics could be explained in more than one way. The New Caledonia Trough is now usually thought to have been initiated by the Late Cretaceous but it still may be Jurassic in initial rifting. There is evidence from studies of its northern aspects that it may have had a two-stage process with more recent Eocene to Oligocene formation timings. Its basement rock is now assumed to have continental characteristics with a thin continental crust of about 10 km (6.2 mi) thickness along its whole length. In the region southwest of New Caledonia, the New Caledonia Trough has a crustal thickness of between 6 and 8 km (3.7 and 5.0 mi). and a total depth from sea floor bottom to Moho of 15–17 km (9.3–10.6 mi). There is generally along the full trough up to 10 km (6.2 mi) of sediments above the basement, but post-Eocene layers are more typically about 1.5 km (0.93 mi) thick. Current understanding of the geology of the trough relies on studies of adjacent structures and the basins adjacent and within the trough. The recent tectonics have been modelled at both the New Caledonian and New Zealand ends of the trough and will be commented on first, before consideration of the geology known of the relevant basins and the consensus stratigraphy.

=== Tectonics ===
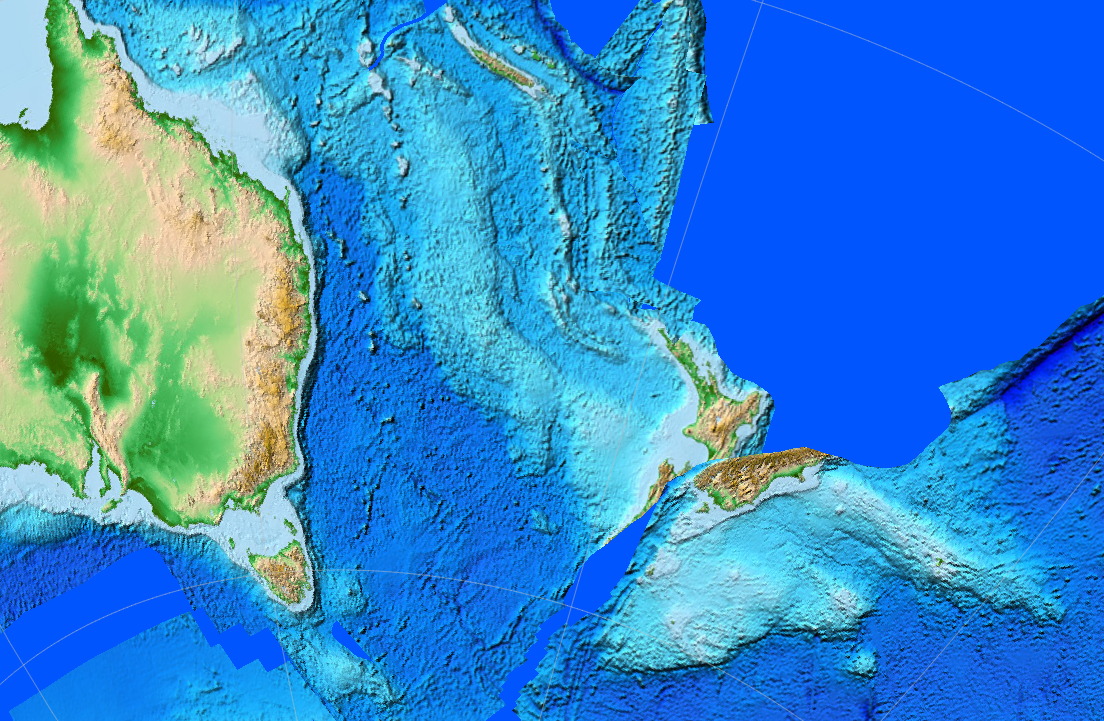
New Caledonia Trough about 30 million years ago showing little change from present.

There is general agreement on the main tectonic phases, but not on finer details. Pacific basin subducting slab dipped southwest beneath the eastern margin of Gondwana in the period from 260 to 110 million years ago. From about 110 to 100 million years ago this convergent regime changed to being extensional and intracontinental rifting became established along much of the eastern Gondwana margin, at which time Zealandia began to separate from Gondwana. By the Late Cretaceous (83.5 million years ago) the New Caledonia Trough was established as an extension basin but can be regarded as a failed rift compared to the eastern opening of the Tasman Sea from the Australian plate that started about this time. Plate modelling in a New Zealand reference frame is currently consistent with North Zealandia containing the proto-New Caledonia Trough rotating from an initial southeast to northeast orientation near New Zealand 43.79 million years ago to an east–west orientation by 26.55 million years ago with the present northwest to southeast orientation established by 10 million years ago continuing to today's orientation. During this period the evidence is that the trough was contained on no more than two blocks with any block rotation occurring in the region of the central sector and southern sectors mentioned above. The tectonic component of the subsidence of the trough has been estimated to vary between more than 1.1 km (0.68 mi) in the north to 2.2 km (1.4 mi) in the south since the Eocene (33.9 million years ago).

=== New Caledonia Basin ===
This basins stratigraphy west of New Caledonia is consistent with foreland loading and tilting associated with Eocene and younger southwest verging thrusts along its eastern margin. Its deepest portion is 3.5 km (2.2 mi) off Grande Terre. A core sample at a depth of 3.196 km (1.986 mi) from the southern central New Caledonia Trough (Note: Ocean Bottom Core DSDP Site 206) had the RU1 regional Eocene-Oligocene hiatus layer at 0.389 km (0.242 mi) deep in the sediments. Another core sample to 0.85 km (0.53 mi) Eocene sediments exists from the middle central New Caledonia Trough. (Note: Ocean Bottom Core Site U1507)

=== Fairway Basin ===
The Fairway Basin which is separated from the New Caledonia Basin by the Fairway Ridge for its full length, is up to 2 km (1.2 mi) deep and joins up at its southern end with the extension of the trough towards the Aotea Basin. A common consensus stratigraphy exists as first defined here. The findings are related to a 0.594 km (0.369 mi) core. (Note: Ocean Bottom Core DSDP Site 208) It is based on the three regional tectonic phases of Zealandia and is:

1. U1 Zealandia Unit-1 – Late Eocene to Recent compressive and passive regimes following the onset and roll-back of the Kermadec–Tonga subduction zone
  - RU1 unconformable surface as recent as 35 million years ago between Units 1 and 2 which is a regional Eocene-Oligocene hiatus.
  - sediment depth between 0.488–0.577 km (0.303–0.359 mi)
2. U2 Zealandia Unit-2 – Late Cretaceous to Eocene extensional accompanying Gondwana breakup
  - RU2 unconformable surface between Units 2 and 3 possibly of Late Cretaceous age (about 105-65 million years ago)
3. U3 Zealandia Unit 3 – Permian to Early Cretaceous eastern Gondwana active subduction margin

=== Aotea Basin ===
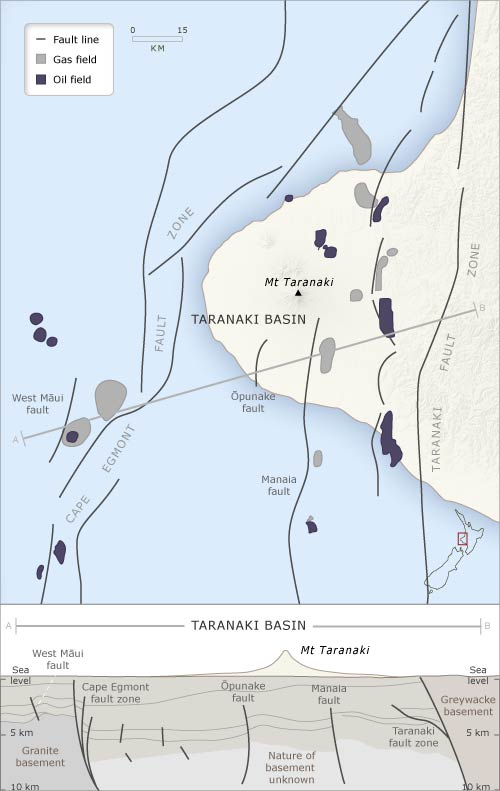
Map and General Cross Section of the Taranaki Basin

Aotea Basin (deepwater Taranaki Basin) sampling has shown a transition at 68 – 66 million years ago (Late Cretaceous) from sediments from land plants to a Paleocene fully oceanic environment by 63.5 – 56 million years ago. Water depths vary from 3 to 1.8 km (1.9 to 1.1 mi).

1. U1a subduction roll-back with back-arc basin opening influenced by Kermadec–Tonga subduction
2. U1b Eocene contraction of Kermadec–Tonga subduction zone
  - RU1
3. U2a Late Cretaceous and Paleocene Tasman Sea opening
4. U2b Cretaceous eastern Gondwana extension
  - RU2
5. U3 Older eastern Gondwana subduction

An area studied in detail of the Lord Howe raise western edge has volcanic seamounts and a canynon entering the basin.

=== Taranaki Basin ===
The Taranaki Basin southern termination of the New Caledonia Trough is in shallow water. Its eastern limit has long been defined by the Taranaki boundary fault system. Due to oil exploration studies the geological history of the Taranaki Basin out to the deep water Taranaki Basin has been well mapped from 98 million years ago to 57 million years ago.
