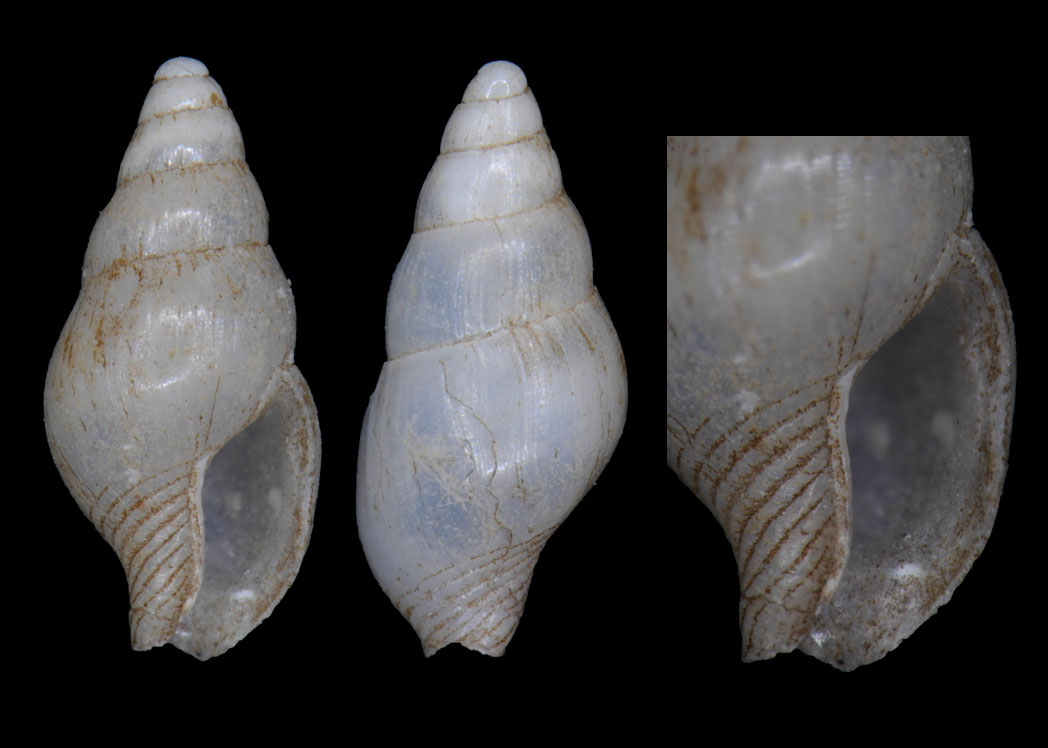
- Shells of Mitrella subtilicostata (holotype in MNHN, Paris)

Scientific classification
- Kingdom: Animalia
- Phylum: Mollusca
- Class: Gastropoda
- Subclass: Caenogastropoda
- Order: Neogastropoda
- Superfamily: Buccinoidea
- Family: Columbellidae
- Genus: Mitrella
- Species: M. subtilicostata

Binomial name
- Mitrella subtilicostata K. Monsecour & D. Monsecour, 2016

= Mitrella subtilicostata =

Species of gastropod

Mitrella subtilicostata is a species of sea snail, a marine gastropod mollusk in the family Columbellidae, the dove snails.

== Description ==
The length of the shell attains 4.8 mm with a narrow coil like shape.

== Distribution ==
This marine species occurs off the Norfolk Ridge, New Caledonia.
