= Melanella maui =

Scientific classification
- Kingdom: Animalia
- Phylum: Mollusca
- Class: Gastropoda
- Subclass: Caenogastropoda
- Order: Littorinimorpha
- Family: Eulimidae
- Genus: Melanella
- Species: M. maui

Binomial name
- Melanella maui (Dell, 1952)

Species of gastropod

Melanella maui is a species of sea snail, a marine gastropod mollusk in the family Eulimidae. The species is one of many species known to exist within the genus, Melanella.

== Description ==
The length of the shell attains 2.5 mm.

== Distribution ==
This species is endemic to New Zealand and occurs on the Challenger Plateau, west of North Island at depths between 536 m and 785 m.
