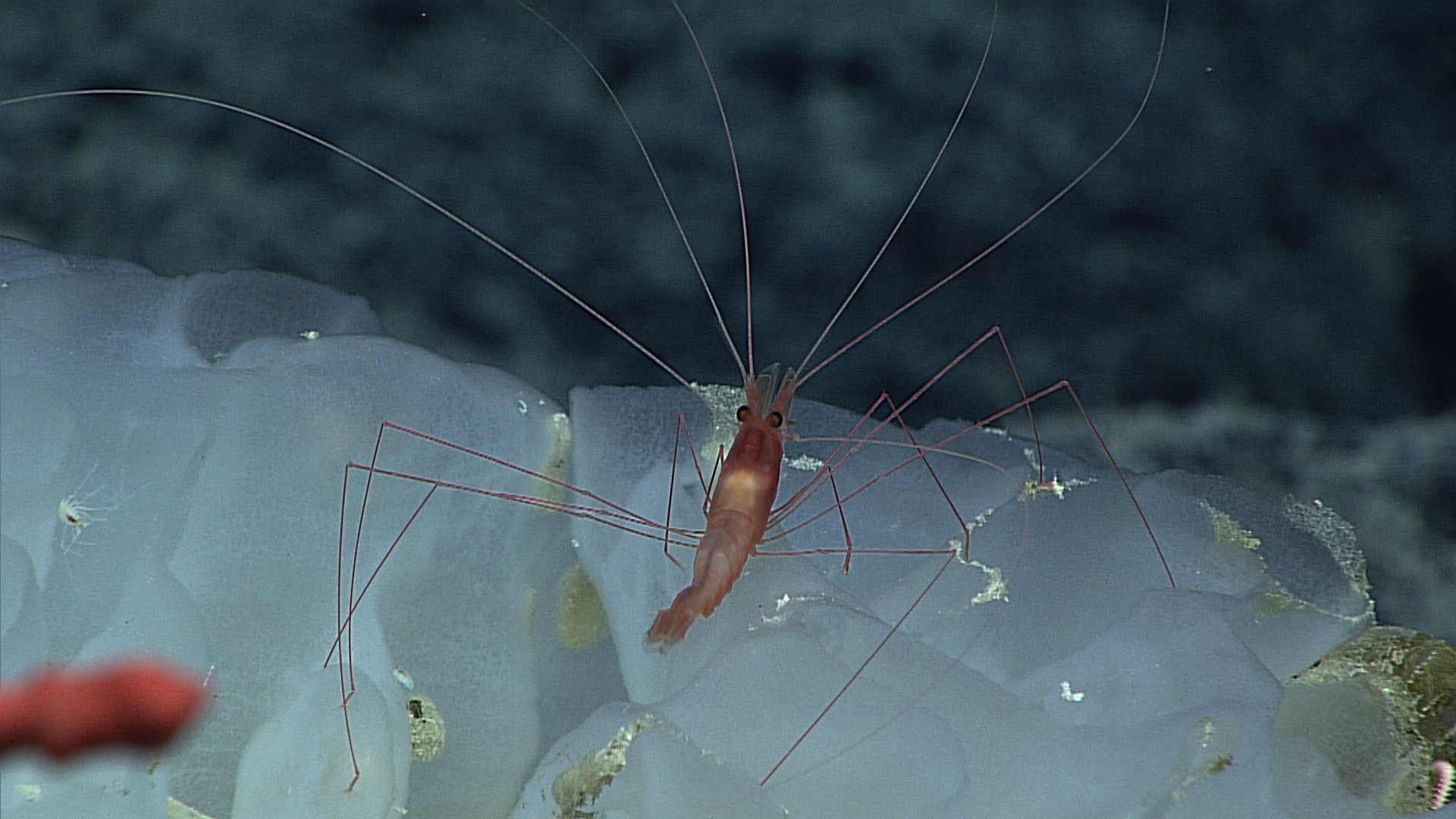

Scientific classification
- Kingdom: Animalia
- Phylum: Arthropoda
- Class: Malacostraca
- Order: Decapoda
- Suborder: Pleocyemata
- Infraorder: Caridea
- Family: Nematocarcinidae
- Genus: Nematocarcinus
- Species: N. tenuirostris

Binomial name
- Nematocarcinus tenuirostris Spence Bate, 1888

= Nematocarcinus tenuirostris =

Species of crustacean

Nematocarcinus tenuirostris, the long-legged shrimp, is a species of shrimp known from the Indian and Pacific Oceans.
