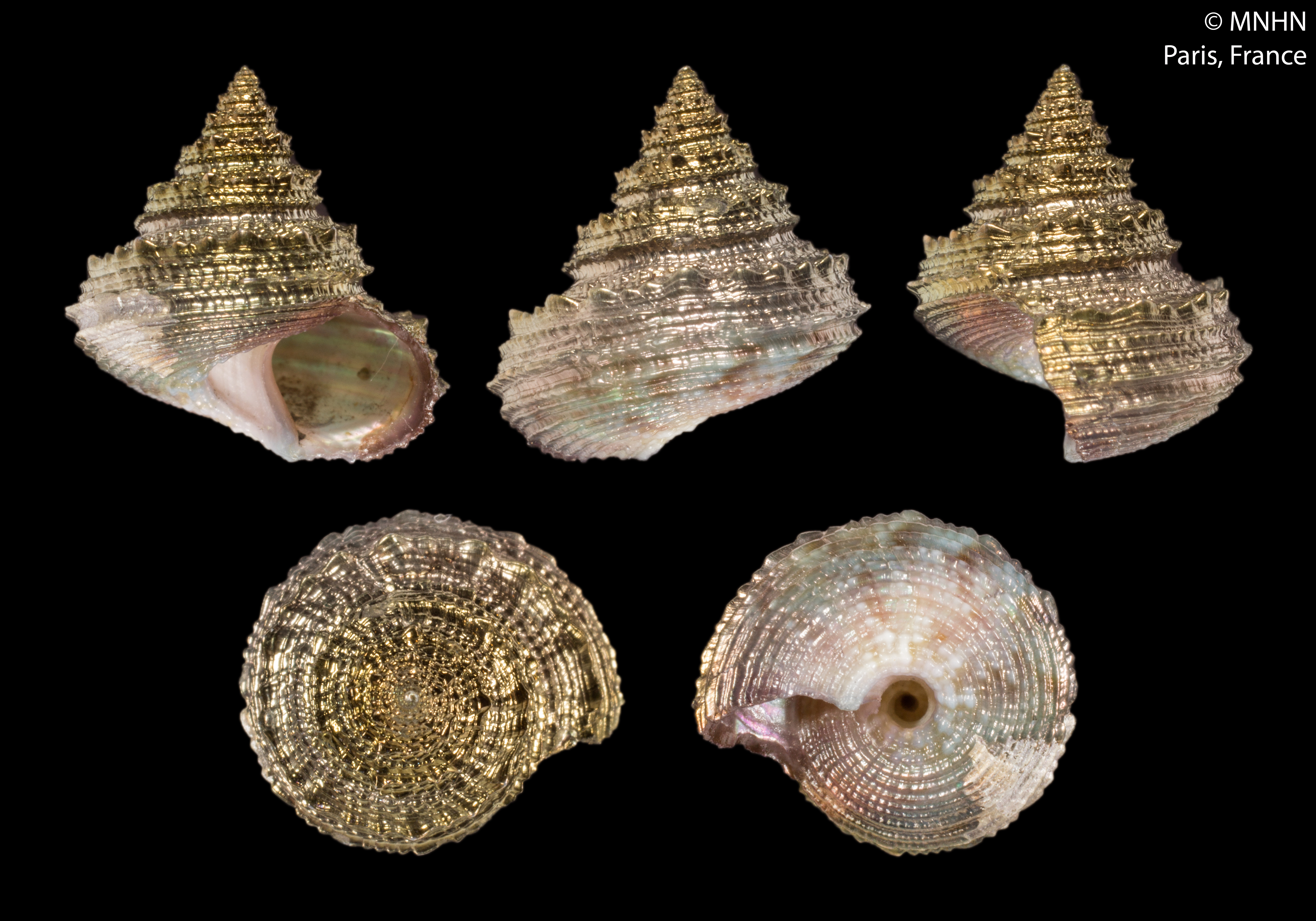
- Shell of Benthastelena diademata (holotype at MNHN, Paris)

Scientific classification
- Kingdom: Animalia
- Phylum: Mollusca
- Class: Gastropoda
- Subclass: Vetigastropoda
- Order: Trochida
- Superfamily: Trochoidea
- Family: Calliostomatidae
- Genus: Benthastelena
- Species: B. diademata

Binomial name
- Benthastelena diademata (B. A. Marshall, 1995)

Synonyms
- Calliostoma diadematum B. A. Marshall, 1995

= Benthastelena diademata =

Species of gastropod

Benthastelena diademata is a species of sea snail, a marine gastropod mollusk, in the family Calliostomatidae within the superfamily Trochoidea, the top snails, turban snails and their allies.

== Distribution ==
This marine species occurs on the Lord Howe Rise in the Coral Sea.
