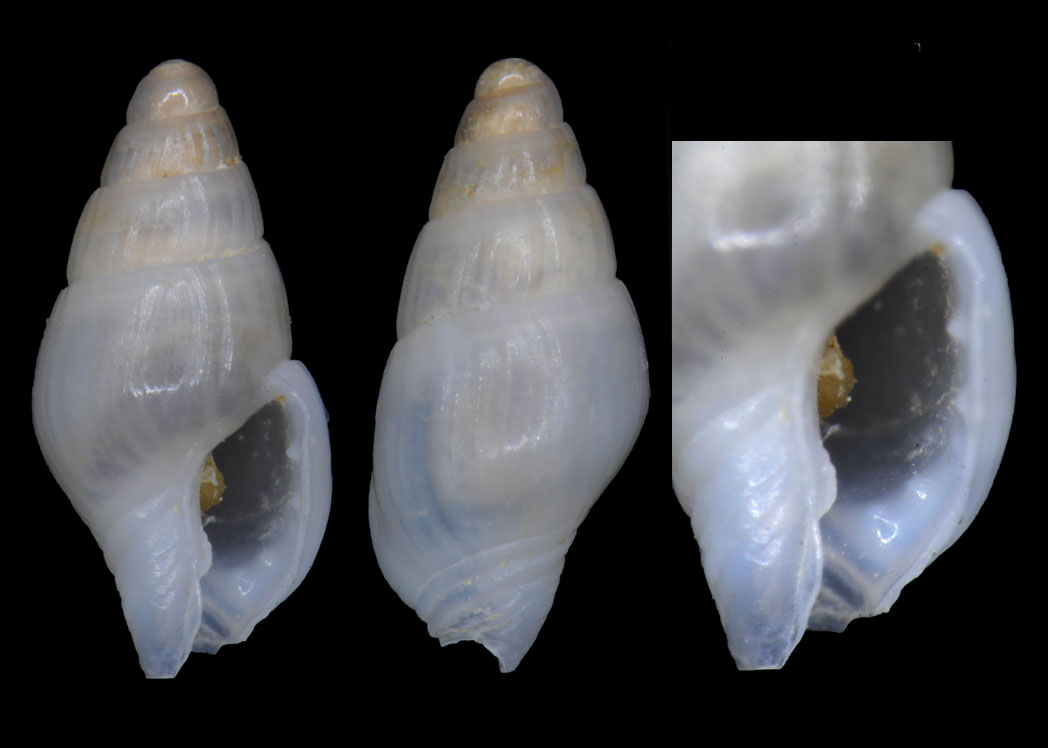
- Shells of Mitrella parvicosta (holotype in MNHN, Paris)

Scientific classification
- Kingdom: Animalia
- Phylum: Mollusca
- Class: Gastropoda
- Subclass: Caenogastropoda
- Order: Neogastropoda
- Superfamily: Buccinoidea
- Family: Columbellidae
- Genus: Mitrella
- Species: M. parvicosta

Binomial name
- Mitrella parvicosta K. Monsecour & D. Monsecour, 2016

= Mitrella parvicosta =

Species of gastropod

Mitrella parvicosta is a species of sea snail, a marine gastropod mollusk in the family Columbellidae, the dove snails. They are usually found in depths ranging from 400-530 meters.

== Description ==
The length of the shell attains 9.3 mm.

== Distribution ==
This marine species occurs off the Norfolk Ridge, New Caledonia.
