= Calliostoma coronatum =

Scientific classification
- Kingdom: Animalia
- Phylum: Mollusca
- Class: Gastropoda
- Subclass: Vetigastropoda
- Order: Trochida
- Family: Calliostomatidae
- Subfamily: Calliostomatinae
- Genus: Calliostoma
- Species: C. coronatum

Binomial name
- Calliostoma coronatum Quinn, 1992

Synonyms
- Calliostoma (Benthastelena) coronatum Quinn, J.F., 1992

Species of gastropod

Calliostoma coronatum is a species of sea snail, a marine gastropod mollusk in the family Calliostomatidae.

Calliostoma coronatum B. A. Marshall, 1995 is an invalid name: junior homonym of Calliostoma coronatum Quinn, 1992; Calliostoma kanakorum is a replacement name)

== Description ==
The height of the cone-shaped shell attains 4.5 mm.

== Distribution ==
This species occurs in the Western Atlantic Ocean, predominantly off Brazil at a depth of 800 m.
