= Joseph Gilbert Seamount =

Continental fragment seamount west of New Zealand

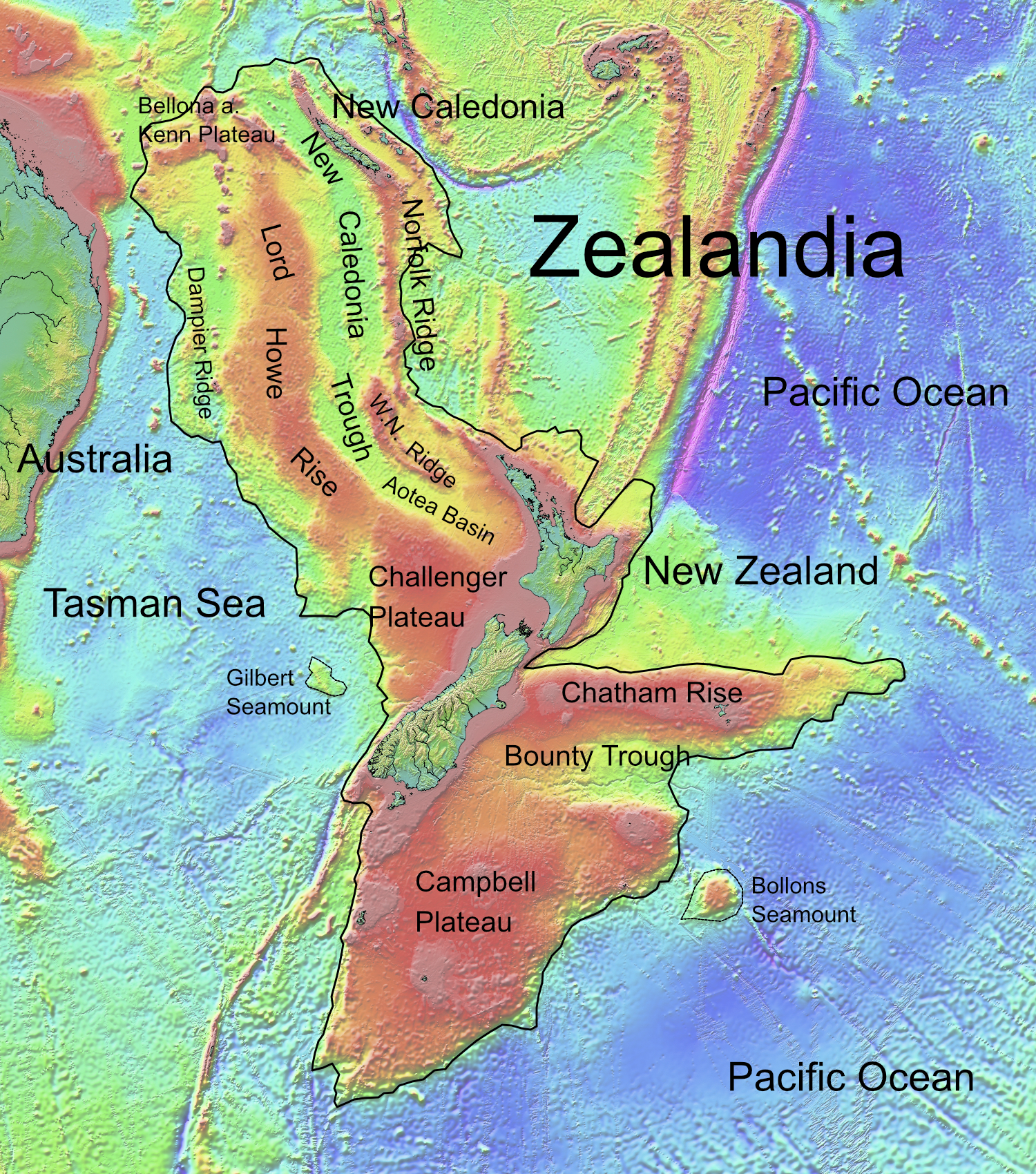
- Topographic map of Zealandia, showing Gilbert Seamount
- Topographic map of Zealandia, showing Gilbert Seamount
- Summit depth: 2,400 m (7,900 ft)

Location
- Location: Tasman Sea
- Coordinates: 42°52′18.1″S 164°4′0.1″E
- Country: New Zealand

Geology
- Type: Seamount (continental fragment)

Joseph Gilbert Seamount is a large seamount in the Tasman Sea located 450 km (280 mi) west of the South Island of New Zealand at the southern edge of the Lord Howe Rise. It has an elongated northwest–southeast trend, covering an area of about 11,500 km^{2} (4,400 mi^{2}) and rising to 2,400 m (7,900 ft) below sea level.

The seamount is a continental fragment that rifted away from the South Tasman Rise and Challenger Plateau during the Cretaceous breakup of Gondwana. It is separated from the easterly Challenger Plateau by a 4,400 m (14,400 ft) deep saddle.

Joseph Gilbert Seamount is named after Joseph Gilbert, captain of HMS Resolution (1771) on the second voyage of James Cook, and has been known under a variety of names throughout its history, including Gilbert Ridge, Gilbert Seamount Complex and Gilbert Seamount.
