= Balleny hotspot =

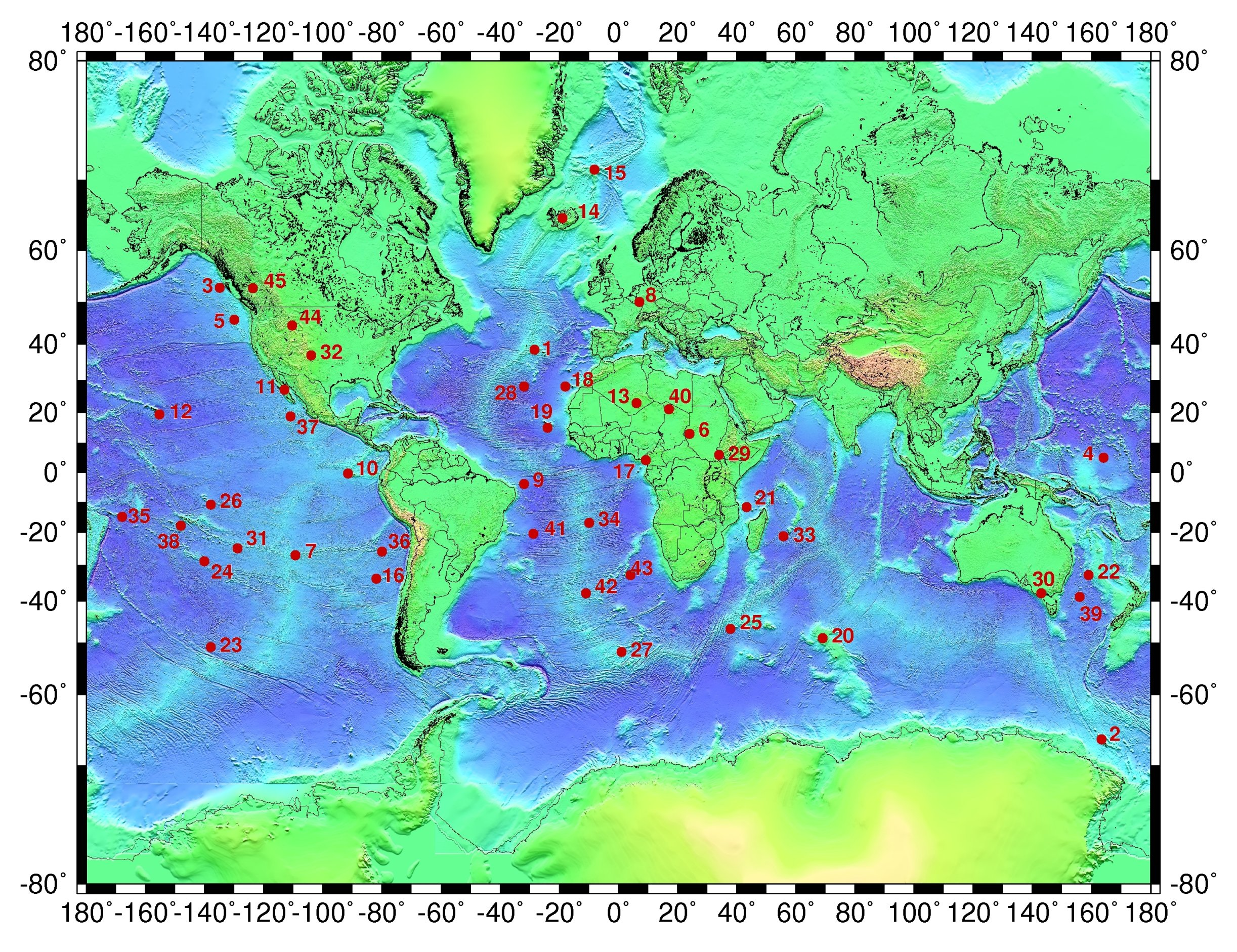
The Balleny hotspot is marked 2 on map.

The Balleny hotspot is a volcanic hotspot located in the Southern Ocean. The hotspot created the Balleny Islands, which forms a chain that extends for about 160 km (99 mi) in a northwest-southeast direction. Due to plate tectonics the hotspot was under different parts of the ocean bed in the past, and this has resulted in a chain of seamounts extending from the East Tasman Plateau. Isotopes and trace elements in the volcanic rocks indicated a high uranium-lead mantle source. The same pattern is seen in basalt from Tasmania, but not from Victoria.
