= Benthastelena susanae =

Scientific classification
- Kingdom: Animalia
- Phylum: Mollusca
- Class: Gastropoda
- Subclass: Vetigastropoda
- Order: Trochida
- Superfamily: Trochoidea
- Family: Calliostomatidae
- Genus: Benthastelena
- Species: †B. susanae

Binomial name
- †Benthastelena susanae Maxwell, 1992

Extinct species of gastropod

Benthastelena susanae is an extinct species of sea snail, a marine gastropod mollusk, in the family Calliostomatidae within the superfamily Trochoidea, the top snails, turban snails and their allies.

== Distribution ==
This species occurs in New Zealand.
