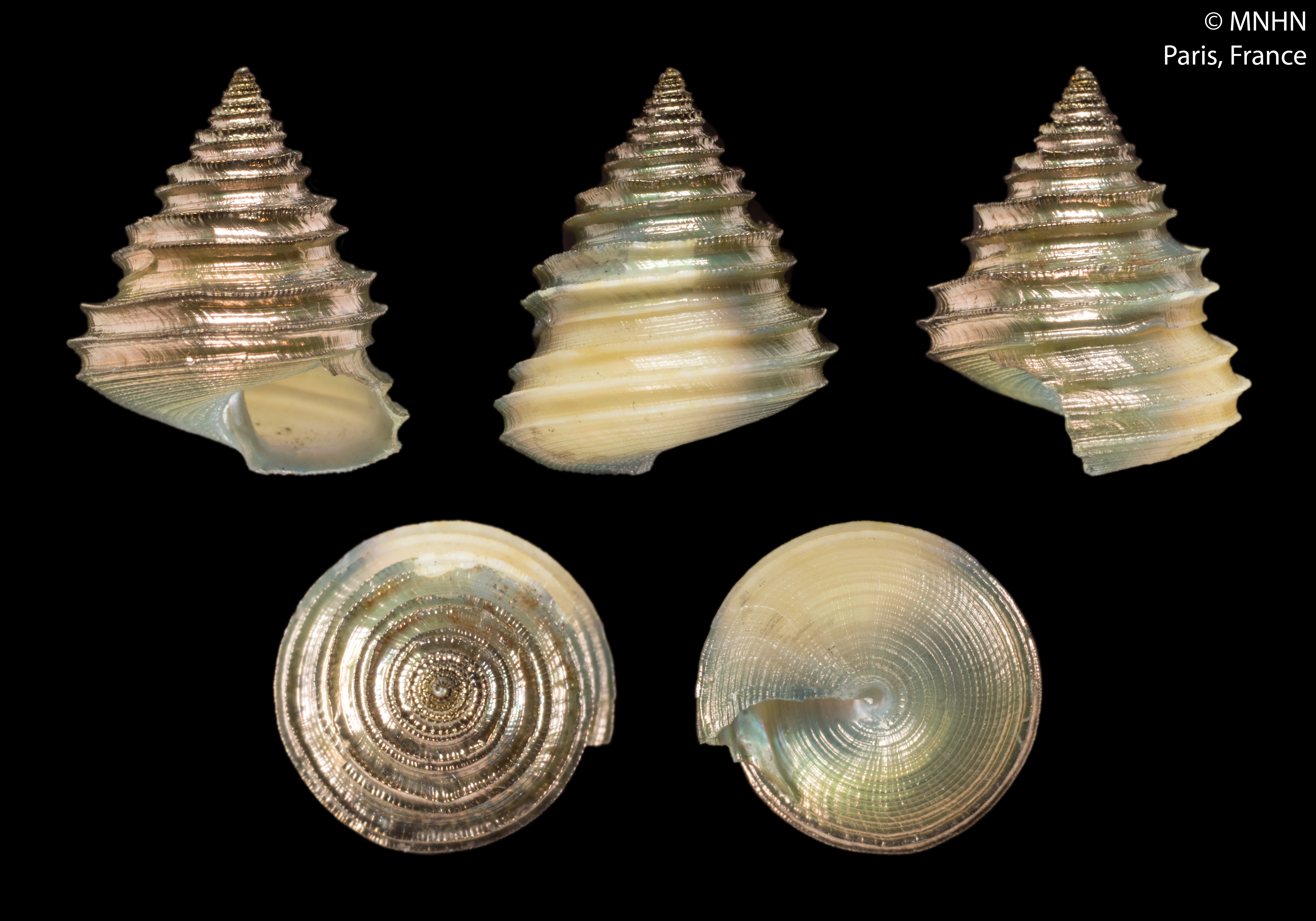
- Shell of Benthastelena cristata

Scientific classification
- Kingdom: Animalia
- Phylum: Mollusca
- Class: Gastropoda
- Subclass: Vetigastropoda
- Order: Trochida
- Superfamily: Trochoidea
- Family: Calliostomatidae
- Genus: Benthastelena; Iredale, 1936

Type species
- Benthastelena katherina Iredale, 1936

Synonyms
- Calliostoma (Benthastelena) Iredale, 1936

= Benthastelena =

Genus of gastropods

Benthastelena is a genus of sea snails, marine gastropod mollusks, in the family Calliostomatidae.

== Species ==
Species within the genus Benthastelena include:

- Benthastelena cristata (B. A. Marshall, 1995)
- Benthastelena diademata (B. A. Marshall, 1995)
- Benthastelena kanakorum (B. A. Marshall, 2001)
- Benthastelena katherina Iredale, 1936
- † Benthastelena muta (Finlay, 1924)
- † Benthastelena susanae Maxwell, 1992
- † Benthastelena transenna (Suter, 1917)

The following species were brought into synonymy:

- Benthastelena coronata (B. A. Marshall, 1995): synonym of Benthastelena kanakorum (B. A. Marshall, 2001)
