= Benthastelena muta =

Scientific classification
- Kingdom: Animalia
- Phylum: Mollusca
- Class: Gastropoda
- Subclass: Vetigastropoda
- Order: Trochida
- Superfamily: Trochoidea
- Family: Calliostomatidae
- Genus: Benthastelena
- Species: †B. muta

Binomial name
- †Benthastelena muta (Finlay, 1924)

Synonyms
- Trochus mutus Finlay, 1924; Trochus nodosus Hutton, 1885

Extinct species of gastropod

Benthastelena muta is an extinct species of sea snail.

It is a marine gastropod mollusk, in the family Calliostomatidae within the superfamily Trochoidea, the top snails, turban snails and their allies.

== Distribution ==
This species occurs in New Zealand.
