= Benthastelena transenna =

Scientific classification
- Kingdom: Animalia
- Phylum: Mollusca
- Class: Gastropoda
- Subclass: Vetigastropoda
- Order: Trochida
- Superfamily: Trochoidea
- Family: Calliostomatidae
- Genus: Benthastelena
- Species: †B. transenna

Binomial name
- †Benthastelena transenna (Suter, 1917)

Synonyms
- Astraea transenna Suter, 1917

Extinct species of gastropod

Benthastelena transenna is an extinct species of sea snail, a marine gastropod mollusk, in the family Calliostomatidae within the superfamily Trochoidea, the top snails, turban snails and their allies.

== Distribution ==
This species occurs in New Zealand.
