= Lansdowne Bank =

Submerged bank near New Caledonia

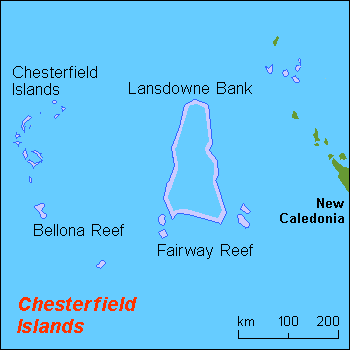
Lansdowne Bank, centre of map

Lansdowne Bank, sometimes called Landsdowne Bank, is an extensive submerged bank located between the main island of New Caledonia and the Chesterfield Islands, in the easternmost part of the Coral Sea. It covers an area of 4,300 km^{2} (1,660 sq mi), making it one of the largest banks of the world, has general depths of 60 to 80 metres (197–262 ft), and a largely sandy bottom. Two reefs mark the shallowest spots of the bank, but they are still submerged at low tide.

Fairway Ridge, also called Fairway Plateau, is a submarine feature shown on some maps in that area. The Lansdowne Bank area marked is far larger than Fairway Plateau, but there are smaller, unnamed plateaus nearby. The Lansdowne Bank area, shown at the northeastern end of Lord Howe Rise, is separated from New Caledonia by the northern New Caledonia Trough.

== Nereus Reef ==
Nereus Reef is at the northern end of Lansdowne Bank. Its given position of 20°07′S 160°28′E is doubtful. Nereus Reef has the least depth of the bank, with 3.7 metres (12 ft). A shoal with a depth of 16 metres (52 ft) is 14 miles (23 km) west-northwest of Nereus Reef.

== Fairway Reef ==
The southeastern end of Lansdowne Bank is marked by Fairway Reef, thus named from its lying in the fairway between Australia and New Caledonia, midway between the Bellona Reefs (south of the Chesterfield Islands) and New Caledonia. Fairway Reef is 3.2 kilometres (2.0 mi) long, about 4 to 5 fathoms (7.3 to 9.1 metres) deep, of coral bottom, and located at 21°00′15″S 161°45′09″E. According to some sources, Fairway Reef dries at low tide.

== Sandy Island Mystery ==
Google Maps and other internet maps showed a large landmass named Sandy Island in northern Lansdowne Bank, but did not show an image for it. The non-existence of this phantom island had been proved by French missions in the 1970s, and the information passed to hydrographic services around the world, but it had remained in the World Vector Shoreline Database. In 2012 Australian scientists again proved the island does not exist.

== See also ==
- List of reefs
