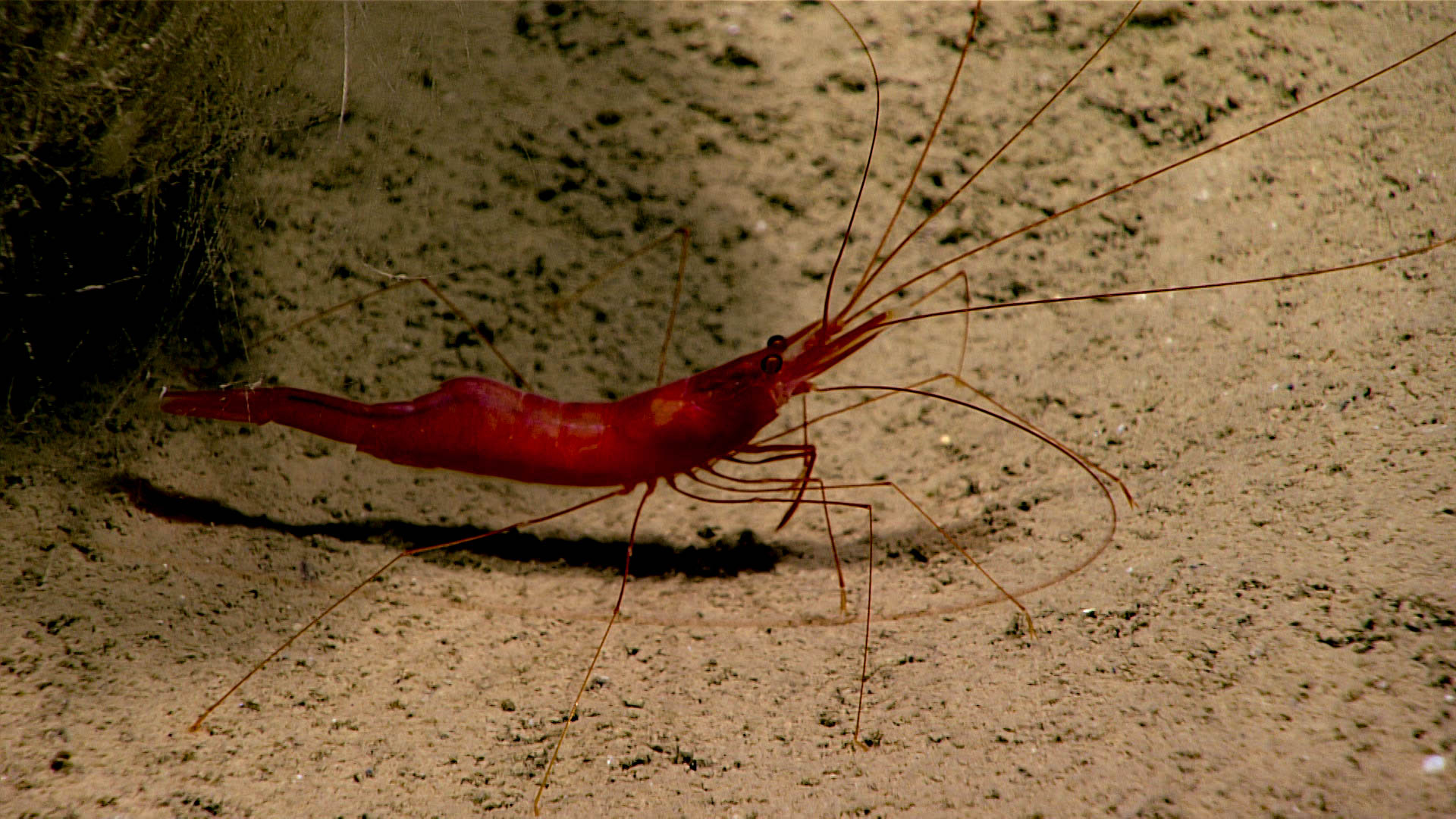
- Nematocarcinus ensifer; Gulf of Mexico, 2,770 m (9,090 ft) below the surface

Scientific classification
- Kingdom: Animalia
- Phylum: Arthropoda
- Class: Malacostraca
- Order: Decapoda
- Suborder: Pleocyemata
- Infraorder: Caridea
- Family: Nematocarcinidae
- Genus: Nematocarcinus; A. Milne-Edwards, 1881

Type species
- Nematocarcinus cursor A. Milne-Edwards, 1881

Synonyms
- Eumiersia Smith, 1882; Stochasmus Spence Bate, 1888

= Nematocarcinus =

Genus of deep-sea shrimp

Nematocarcinus, sometimes known as spider shrimp, is a genus of caridean shrimp, the nominotype of Nematocarcinidae. Similar to the other members of their family, Nematocarcinus inhabit the deep sea, walking on the seabed with their specialized, extremely elongate legs (the pereiopods). Despite continuing fisheries experiments, they are currently not commercially fished, but often appear as bycatch.

== Description ==
Nematocarcinus has a number of diagnostic characters, such as the shape and teeth of the rostrum, the shape of the third abdominal tergite, the shape of the fifth abdominal pleura along with short protuberances or a ridge on the inner surface of its anterior margin, the accessory teeth of the telson, and the ventral margin of the sixth abdominal somite (the distoventral organ) along with its associated setae. Another notable trait is their "mud shoes"; the long and slender pereopods possess tufts of long setae at the dactyls, which presumably helps distribute their weight over the pelagic sediment. In general, the bodies of these shrimp are rather delicate, and specimens are often damaged when collected by traditional methods such as trawling.

These shrimp are inhabitants of the deep sea, with some species living at over 2,500 m (8,200 ft) deep, and up to 5,000 m (16,000 ft) deep on the abyssal plains. They may sometimes occur around hydrothermal vents. In some regions, such as the Pacific Coast of Mexico, Nematocarcinus may be locally abundant; up to 500 shrimp per hectare. Members of this genus are very tolerant of hypoxic conditions (low dissolved oxygen content). Other than the Americas, Nematocarcinus is also known from the southern Indian Ocean, South-Western Pacific, North-Western Pacific, and the Southern Ocean.

Females may be highly fecund, with records of up to 15500 eggs carried by a female N. ensifer, though species such as N. lanceopes carry only 2400.

== Species ==
The following species are considered valid:

- Nematocarcinus africanus Crosnier & Forest, 1973
- Nematocarcinus agassizii Faxon, 1893
- Nematocarcinus bituberculatus Chace, 1986
- Nematocarcinus challengeri Burukovsky, 2006
- Nematocarcinus combensis Burukovsky, 2000
- Nematocarcinus crosnieri Burukovsky, 2000
- Nematocarcinus cursor A. Milne-Edwards, 1881
- Nematocarcinus ensifer (Smith, 1882)
- Nematocarcinus evansi Burukovsky, 2000
- Nematocarcinus exilis (Spence Bate, 1888)
- Nematocarcinus faxoni Burukovsky, 2001
- Nematocarcinus gracilipes Filhol, 1884
- Nematocarcinus gracilis Spence Bate, 1888
- Nematocarcinus hanamuri Burukovsky, 2000
- Nematocarcinus kaiensis Burukovsky, 2000
- Nematocarcinus lanceopes Spence Bate, 1888
- Nematocarcinus longirostris Spence Bate, 1888
- Nematocarcinus machaerophorus Burukovsky, 2003
- Nematocarcinus manningi Burukovsky, 2003
- Nematocarcinus novaezealandicus Burukovsky, 2006
- Nematocarcinus nudirostris Burukovsky, 1991
- Nematocarcinus parvus Burukovsky, 2000
- Nematocarcinus paucidentatus Spence Bate, 1888
- Nematocarcinus poupini Burukovsky, 2007
- Nematocarcinus productus Spence Bate, 1888
- Nematocarcinus proximatus Spence Bate, 1888
- Nematocarcinus pseudocursor Burukovsky, 1990
- Nematocarcinus pseudogracilis Burukovsky, 2007
- Nematocarcinus richeri Burukovsky, 2000
- Nematocarcinus romenskyi Burukovsky, 2000
- Nematocarcinus rotundus Crosnier & Forest, 1973
- Nematocarcinus safari Burukovsky, 2000
- Nematocarcinus sigmoideus Macpherson, 1984
- Nematocarcinus subtegulisfactus Burukovsky, 2000
- Nematocarcinus subtilis Burukovsky, 2000
- Nematocarcinus tenuipes Spence Bate, 1888
- Nematocarcinus tenuirostris Spence Bate, 1888
- Nematocarcinus tuerkayi Burukovsky, 2005
- Nematocarcinus undulatipes Spence Bate, 1888
- Nematocarcinus webberi Burukovsky, 2006
- Nematocarcinus yaldwyni Burukovsky, 2006
