= Benthastelena katherina =

Scientific classification
- Kingdom: Animalia
- Phylum: Mollusca
- Class: Gastropoda
- Subclass: Vetigastropoda
- Order: Trochida
- Superfamily: Trochoidea
- Family: Calliostomatidae
- Genus: Benthastelena
- Species: B. katherina

Binomial name
- Benthastelena katherina Iredale, 1936

Synonyms
- Calliostoma (Benthastelena) katherina (Iredale, 1936); Calliostoma katherina (Iredale, 1936)

Species of gastropod

Benthastelena katherina is a species of sea snail, a marine gastropod mollusk, in the family Calliostomatidae within the superfamily Trochoidea, the top snails, turban snails and their allies.
