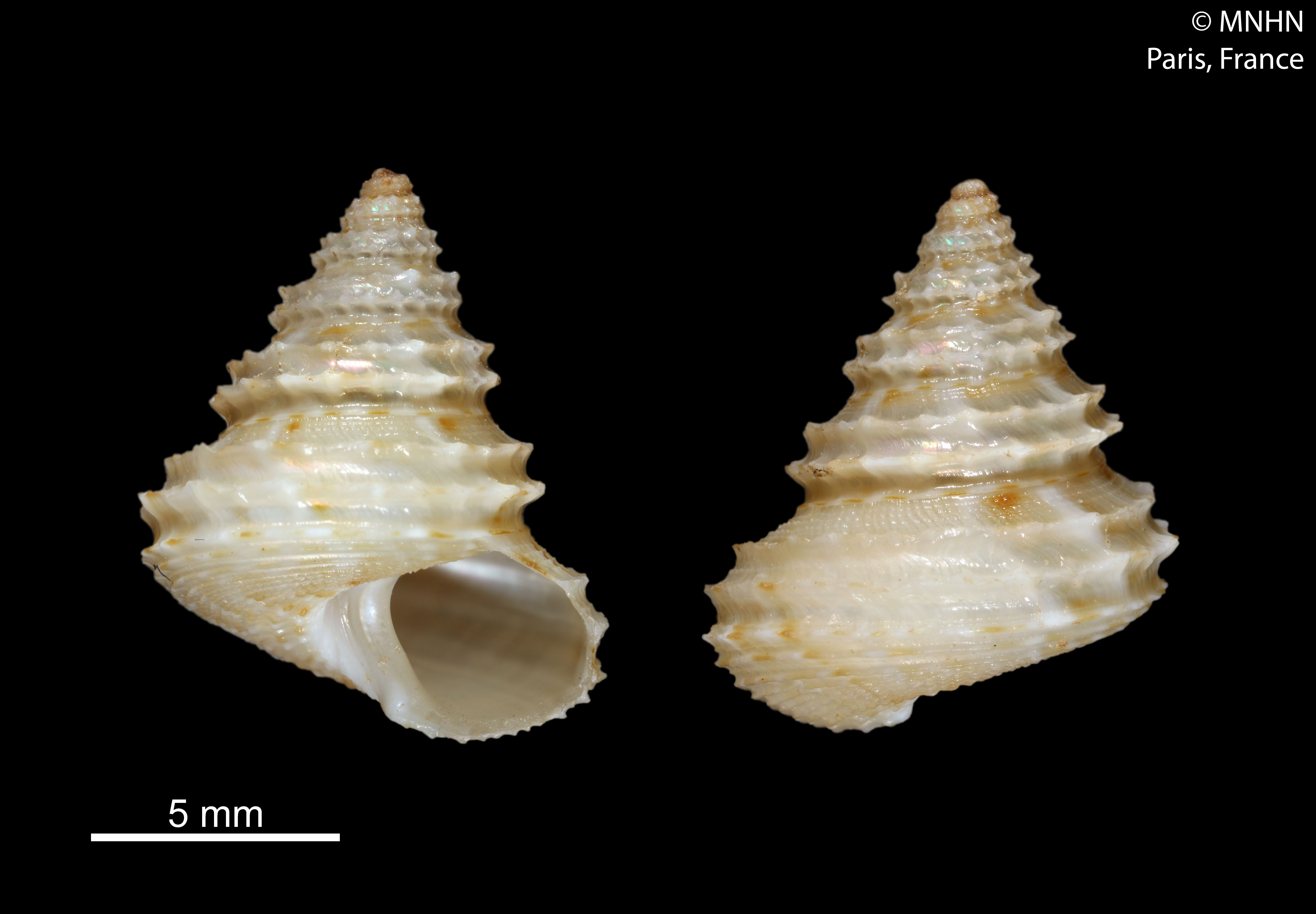
- Shell of Benthastelena kanakorum (specimen aty MNHN, Paris)

Scientific classification
- Kingdom: Animalia
- Phylum: Mollusca
- Class: Gastropoda
- Subclass: Vetigastropoda
- Order: Trochida
- Superfamily: Trochoidea
- Family: Calliostomatidae
- Genus: Benthastelena
- Species: B. kanakorum

Binomial name
- Benthastelena kanakorum (B. A. Marshall, 2001)

Synonyms
- Benthastelena coronata (B. A. Marshall, 1995); Calliostoma (Benthastelena) coronatum B. A. Marshall, 1995; Calliostoma (Benthastelena) kanakorum B. A. Marshall, 2001; Calliostoma coronatum B. A. Marshall, 1995; Calliostoma kanakorum B. A. Marshall, 2001

= Benthastelena kanakorum =

Species of gastropod

Benthastelena kanakorum is a species of sea snail, a marine gastropod mollusk, in the family Calliostomatidae within the superfamily Trochoidea, the top snails, turban snails and their allies.

== Distribution ==
This marine species occurs off New Caledonia.
