= South Tasman Rise =

Area of seafloor about 1500 m deep south of Hobart, Tasmania in the Southern Ocean

The South Tasman Rise is an area of seafloor that lies 550 km south of Hobart, Tasmania in the Southern Ocean where water depths are about 1,500 metres. The South Tasman Rise is also known as the Tasmania Ridge or South Tasmania Ridge.

The South Tasman Rise is a sunken land bridge that used to connect Tasmania (and by extension, the rest of Australia) to Antarctica. It served as one end of the wider Antarctic land bridge, and existed as a terrestrial connection from the Late Cretaceous (about 96 million years ago, when rifting started to significantly narrow connections between Antarctica and Australia) to the early-mid Eocene (about 50 million years ago). It started to rapidly submerge over the next few million years.

Exploration of this oceanic region has taken place via sonar, gravity field, magnetic field, a few drill holes and deliberate or accidental dredging of rocks up to the surface.

== Geology ==
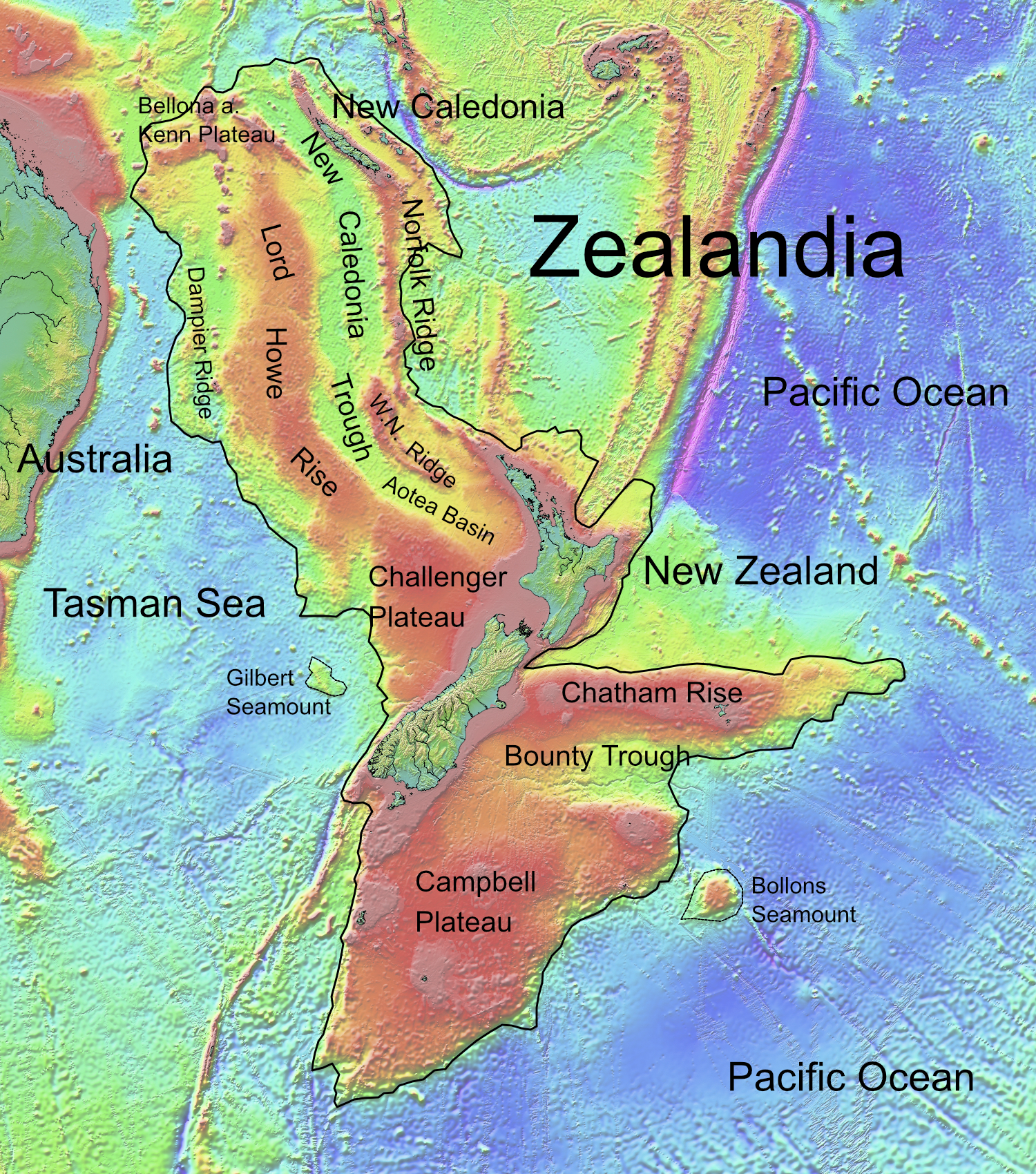
Topographic map of Zealandia that includes the eastern most portion of the South Tasman Rise unlabelled on the map, at the far left of the map, just above the latitude of the label for the Campbell Plateau. North of the South Tasman Rise is the East Tasman Plateau and Cascade Seamount both south east of Tasmania which are also unlabelled.

The rise forms a northern extension from the Macquarie-Balleny Ridge which extends to the subantarctic Balleny Islands. To east of the rise is the Tasman Abyssal Plain, while the South Australian Basin extends westwards, south of the Great Australian Bight. The rise contains a number of seamounts, some of which have flat summits, indicating exposure above the sea surface at some time.

The rise most probably originates from subsided continental crust that fragmented as Australia and Antarctica separated.

This area of the seafloor is slated for exploration of offshore oil reserves. No oil has been recovered from the South Tasman Rise.

=== Rocks ===
A quartz syenite sample has an age of 1119 Ma which is Grenville in age. This kind of rock resembles rocks from the Grenville magmatic province in the west of the United States. It supports the idea that Laurentia and eastern Australia, including the South Tasman Rise were once joined to each other during the time of the Rodinia supercontinent.

Dolerite similar to the Jurassic dolerite in Tasmania has been recovered by dredging from the centre of the South Tasman Rise on RV Rig Seismic on its cruise 147.

Glomar Challenger drilled a borehole on the southern slope of STR. Hole 280 in oceanic crust resulted in basaltic intrusive of age 64.2 Ma. The hole at site 281 resulted in Precambrian quartz mica schist.

RV Sonne did a cruise titled SO-36B in 1985 which did seismic profiles.

=== Tertiary sediments ===
Bottle green coloured microtectites were found in borehole 1169 at around early Pliocene age, 202.14 meters below the seabed.

=== Exploration ===
Ocean Drilling Program Leg 189 made a borehole into the sediments termed Site 1171. Site 1169 was drilled at 145°14.2′E, 47°3.9′S.

== Fishery ==
The rise forms a sector of an international fishery managed by Australia and New Zealand. New Zealand ceased fishing the area in the 2000-01 fishing season. By agreement between New Zealand and Australia the zone has been closed to commercial fishing since 2007. The principal species of fish sought after are the Orange Roughy and Oreo Dory using deepwater demersal trawlers.

The northern part of the South Tasman Rise lies in the Australian Fishing Zone, in the exclusive economic zone of Australia, but the south end lies in international waters.

Orange Roughy (Hoplostethus atlanticus) is an important fish found between 1 and 2 km deep on the South Tasman Rise. Fishing for orange roughy in international waters ramped up in late 1997. 1998 saw the introduction of Arrangement Between the Government of Australia and the Government of New Zealand for the Conservation and Management of Orange Roughy on the South Tasman Rise. This agreement set a research target of 150 tonnes per country, intended to input data to scientific research on the fish population structure. Australian fishermen were allowed to catch three times as much fish as the New Zealanders. The quota was set at 2100 and then 2400 tonnes for 1999-2000. However it was exceeded so the fishing ground was closed till the end of February 2000. In June 1999 fishing boats from South Africa and one registered in Belize came in to fish the rise outside of the bilateral agreement. Diplomatic pressure from Australia caused the Belize government to deregister its vessel and for the South Africans to withdraw their boats. A new agreement was made in 2000 about the orange roughy fishery. One feature of this new agreement was a 2:1 payback for over fishing: if the country's quota was exceeded, it had to pay back via a double reduction in its future fish allowance.

== Marine reserve ==
The South Tasman Rise Commonwealth Marine Reserve was declared in 2007. The reserve seeks to protect unique environments for marine life which are of significant scientific interest.

== See also ==
- Chatham Rise
- Lord Howe Rise
