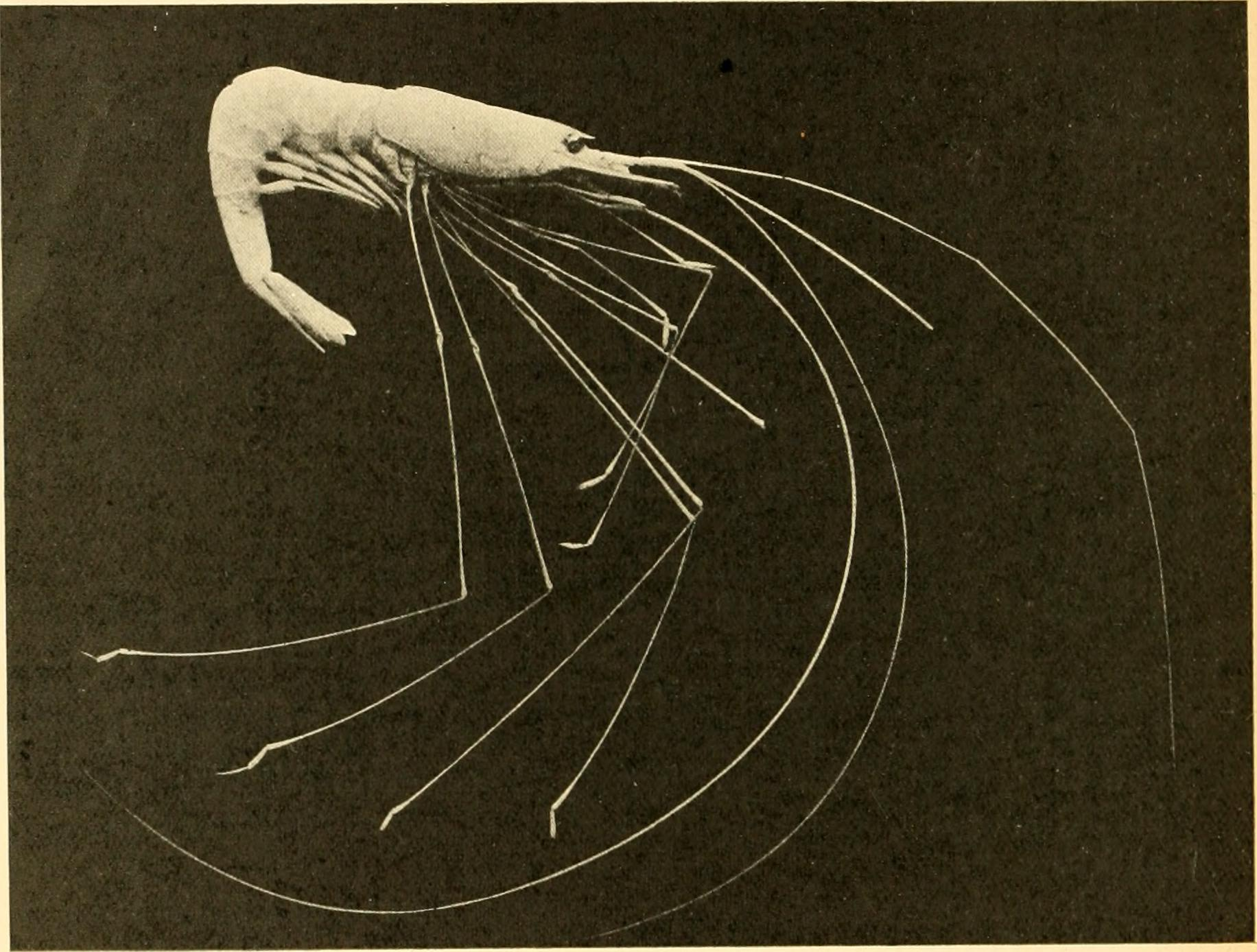
- Nematocarcinus undulatipes

Scientific classification
- Kingdom: Animalia
- Phylum: Arthropoda
- Clade: Pancrustacea
- Class: Malacostraca
- Order: Decapoda
- Suborder: Pleocyemata
- Infraorder: Caridea
- Superfamily: Nematocarcinoidea
- Family: Nematocarcinidae; Smith, 1884

= Nematocarcinidae =

Family of crustaceans

Nematocarcinidae is a family of crustaceans belonging to the order Decapoda. Sometimes called spider shrimp, they inhabit deeper waters beyond the continental shelf, to depths of around 3,000 metres (9,800 ft).

These shrimp are soft-shelled, and small to medium-sized. The pleura of their second abdominal segment overlaps with the adjacent segments. Their first two pairs of pereiopods are similar, with an unsegmented carpus and ending in chelae (pincers), unlike the third pair which lack chelae. The last three pairs of pereiopods (sometimes the second as well) are very elongate, hence the name (nemato-; thread). Exopods are present on the first to fourth pairs of pereiopods. Shrimp of this family range in color from pale orange to deep red.

5 genera are known:

- Lenzicarcinus Burukovsky, 2005
- Macphersonus Burukovsky, 2012
- Nematocarcinus Milne-Edwards, 1881
- Nigmatullinus Burukovsky, 1991
- Segonzackomaius Burukovsky, 2011

The family Lipkiidae was moved out of this family; it was formerly a subfamily of Nematocarcinidae before being split out.
