= Lord Howe Rise =

Deep sea plateau, west of New Zealand

- Stratigraphic range: 216–6.5 Ma
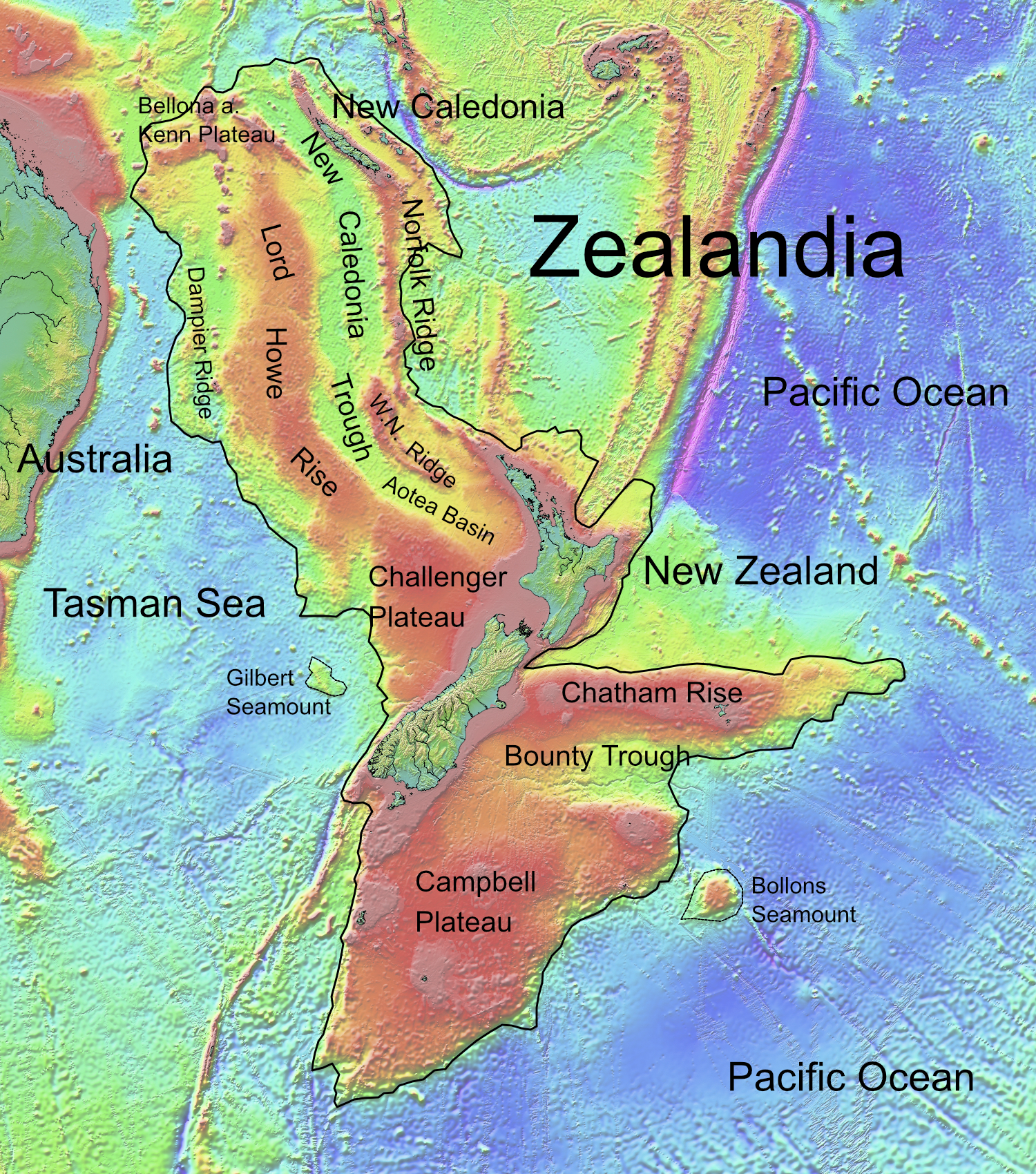
- The Lord Howe Rise is part of the continent known as Zealandia.

Location
- Coordinates: 28°S 161°E
- Region: South Pacific, Coral Sea, Tasman Sea

Type section
- Named for: Lord Howe Island

The Lord Howe Rise is a deep sea plateau which extends from south west of New Caledonia to the Challenger Plateau, west of New Zealand in the south west of the Pacific Ocean. To its west is the Tasman Abyssal Plain and to the east is the New Caledonia Basin. Lord Howe Rise has a total area of about 1,500,000 km^{2} (580,000 sq mi), and generally lies about 750 to 1,200 metres under water. It is part of Zealandia, a much larger continent that is now mostly submerged, and so is composed of continental crust. Some have included the 3,500 m (11,500 ft) deep New Caledonia Basin as within the rise, given its continental crust origin, and this would give a larger total area of 1,950,000 km^{2} (750,000 sq mi).

== Geology ==
The Lord Howe Rise is associated with seafloor spreading which also resulted in the creation of the Tasman Sea. The geology has not yet been characterised as well as other parts of Zealandia but when previous samples are analysed with current geological techniques they fit with the Zealandia hypothesis. The seafloor is known to be dominated by soft sediments and the highest quality recent survey only mapped approximately 25,500 km^{2} (9,800 sq mi) of the western flank of the rise which is less than 1% of the total area of the rise. In this area about 0.1% of the rise's seafloor was classed as hard substrata based on a combined area of 31 km^{2} (12 sq mi) for 16 volcanic peaks. Sandstone rocks dredged from the central Lord Howe Rise contained granite pebbles that were in the range 216–183 million years old. It was rifted away from Eastern Australia in association with a mid-ocean ridge that was active from 80 to 60 million years ago, and now lies 800 kilometres offshore from mainland Australia.

The Lord Howe Rise contains a line of seamounts called the Lord Howe Seamount Chain which formed during the Miocene period when this part of Zealandia existed over the Lord Howe hotspot. One rhyolite sample has been dated at 97 million years drilled on the southern Lord Howe Rise. Lord Howe Island was the last volcano to erupt on the rise 6.5 million years ago.

== Islands, reefs and seamounts ==
Lord Howe Island and Ball's Pyramid cap a seamount towards the central east of the rise in an area known as the Lord Howe platform. The Lord Howe Seamount Chain extends northwards along the rise. The seamounts provide habitat to a diverse range of marine species which attracts commercial fishers, but cover a very small area, less than 1% of the total area of Lord Howe Rise.

Further north is the Elizabeth and Middleton part of the Coral Sea Islands, which together with reefs around Lord Howe Island are the most southern coral reefs on Earth.

== Environment ==
The seabed on the rise is mostly sandy mud with some volcanic outcrops, gravel and boulders.

The doubleheader fish, Coris bulbifrons, is endemic to reefs on the Lord Howe Rise and the West Norfolk Rise.

=== Resources ===
Much of the basin remains unexplored in relation to oil and gas reserves.

== See also ==
- New Caledonia Trough – Oceanic trough between New Caledonia and New Zealand
- Chatham Rise – Area of ocean floor to the east of New Zealand
- Norfolk Ridge – Submarine ridge between New Caledonia and New Zealand
- South Tasman Rise – Area of seafloor about 1500 m deep south of Hobart, Tasmania in the Southern Ocean
