= Challenger Plateau =

Submarine plateau west of New Zealand

Coordinates: 39.1°S 169.0°E

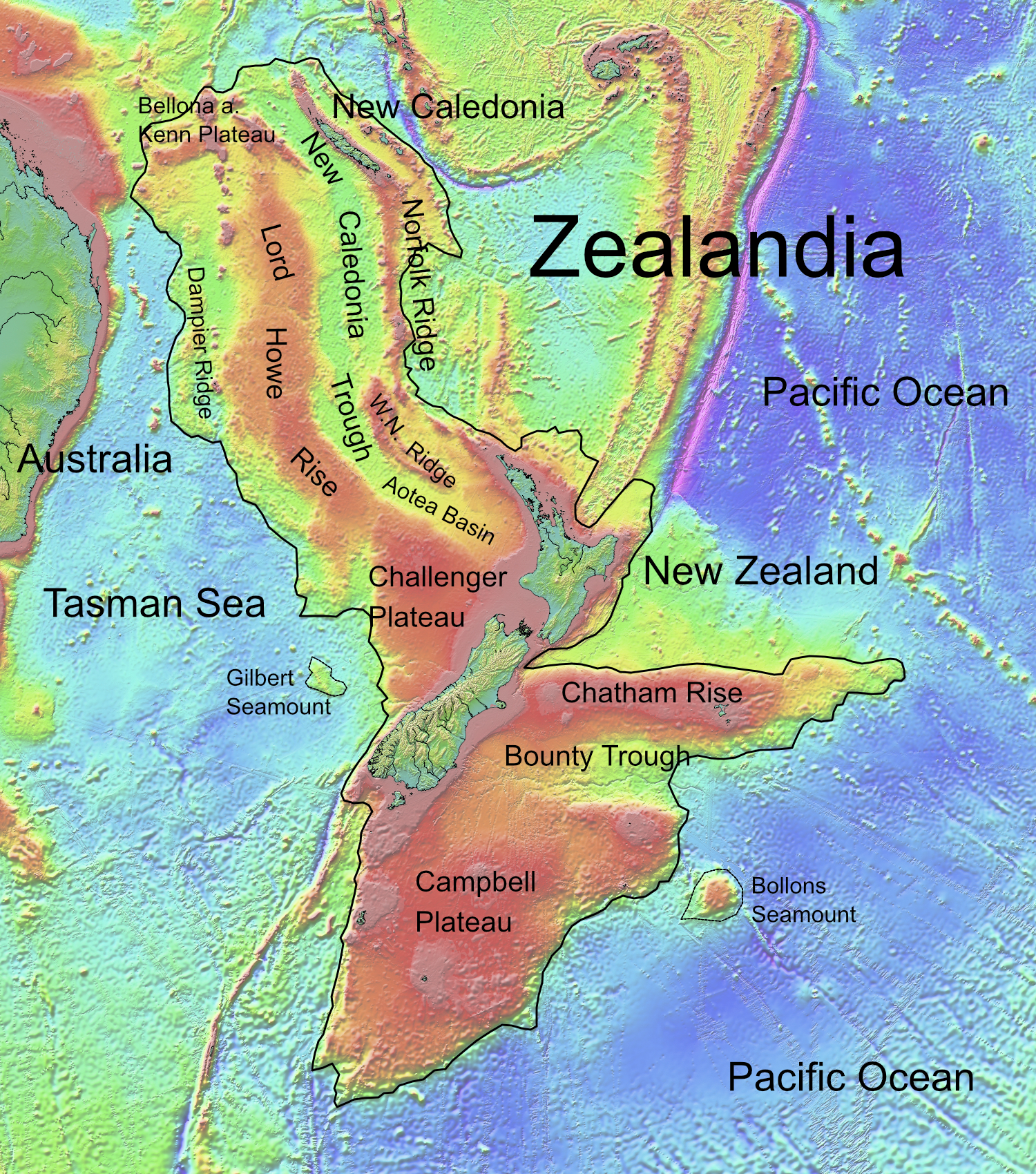
Topographic map of Zealandia showing the Challenger Plateau

The Challenger Plateau is a large submarine plateau west of New Zealand and south of the Lord Howe Rise. It has an approximate diameter of 500 km (310 mi) and an area of about 280,000 km^{2} (110,000 sq mi). The water depth over the plateau varies between 500 m (1,600 ft) to 1,500 m (4,900 ft) and is covered by up to 3,500 m (11,500 ft) of sedimentary rocks of Upper Cretaceous to recent in age. The plateau originated in the Gondwanan breakup and is one of the five major submerged parts of Zealandia, a largely submerged continent.
