= Norfolk Ridge =

Submarine ridge between New Caledonia and New Zealand

- Stratigraphic range: 85–2 Ma
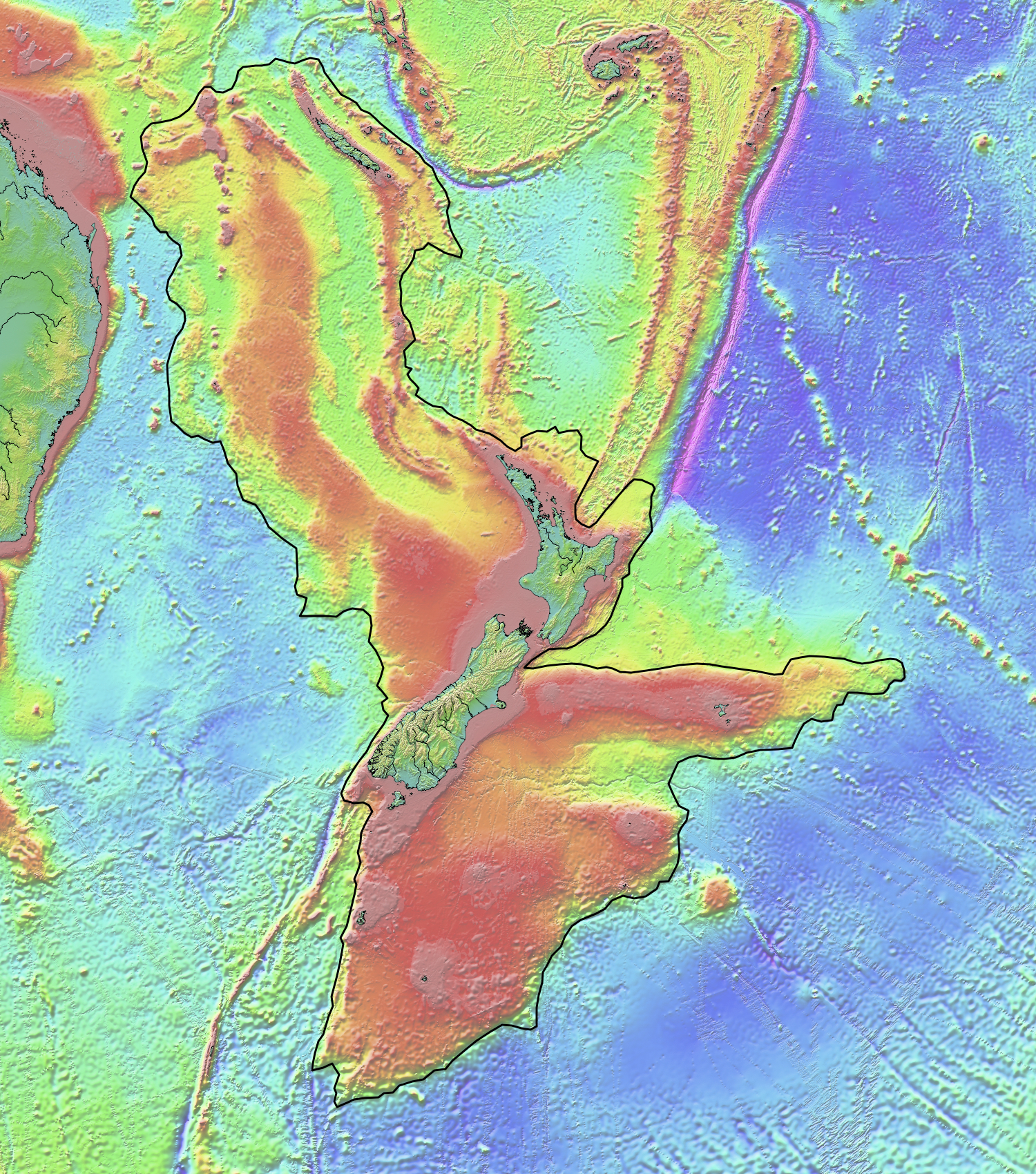
- The Norfolk Ridge in relation to other Pacific Ocean seafloor features. The Zealandia continental margin is shown in black.

Lithology
- Primary: Mesozoic basement
- Other: Limestone, mudstone with andesite, trachyandesite, shoshonite lavas

Location
- Coordinates: 27°S 167.5°E
- Region: South Pacific
- Extent: 1,500 km (930 mi)

Type section
- Named for: Norfolk Island
- Year defined: 2023
- Region: South Pacific Ocean

The Norfolk Ridge (Norfolk Island Ridge, Norfolk Rise, South New Caledonia Ridge) is a long submarine ridge running between New Caledonia and New Zealand, about 1,300 km (810 mi) off the east-coast of Australia.

It is part of a complex region of ridges between the oceanic crust of the Pacific plate and the continental crust of Australia. Little has been known about the Norfolk Ridge; however, it generally lies about 1,000–1,200 m (3,300–3,900 ft) below sea level and consists of Late Cretaceous continental crust. It is part of Zealandia, a continent that was submerged 60-85 million years ago.

== Geography ==
The Norfolk Ridge is about 1,500 km (930 mi) long and is up to 100 km (62 mi) wide. It is between the New Caledonia Trough and Norfolk Basin which has central and southern parts. The Norfolk Ridge emerges above the sea surface at Grande Terre of New Caledonia, Norfolk Island, and part of the northern North Island of New Zealand. At about 31°S proceeding towards New Zealand, the ridge widens and splits into the Reinga Ridge and West Norfolk Ridge, which are separated by the Reinga Basin.

=== Geology ===
The geology has only been well characterised near Grande Terre, Norfolk Island and near Northland but there is now sufficient evidence from oceanographic studies to revise the former view that the tectonics were just those of the two ends of the ridge. The Norfolk Ridge formed as a depocenter along the eastern margin of Zealandia prior to the Eocene. This formation is suggested to be Mesozoic to early Cenozoic. The ridge itself came into being from then to the Oligocene as part of a spontaneous mode of subduction initiation associated with the Kermadec–Tonga subduction zone. This was previously not understood from the geological studies near Grande Terre and Northland which fitted best an induced subduction initiation model.

The Norfolk Ridge basement is 20–25 km (12–16 mi) thick with continental crust characteristics. It can be seen as a continuation of the mesozoic basement of Grande Terre (Tremena and Central Chain terranes) through to the Waipapa and Murihiku terranes of New Zealand. There is no evidence of the allochthons that are found in New Caledonia and Northland, except for one limited nappe area on the ridge's eastern flank. The limited rocks dredged include undated andesitic to trachyandesitic lava, a 26.3 ± 0.1 Ma shoshonite, 23 – 16 Ma or probable Pliocene limestone, Cretaceous black shales, late Eocene mudstone and middle to late Eocene sedimentary breccias. There are at least seven seamounts located on the western flank of the ridge with three samples from their flanks dated between 33 and 21.5 Ma. (Note: An earlier report was of 8 seamounts, by some of the same authors, of which 4 had been sampled. Other subsequent publications by the same group map less than 8 seamounts.) Quaternary coral reefs and intraplate basalts that are much younger at 2–3 Ma are found on Norfolk Island.
