= List of submarine topographical features =

Depiction of the abyssal zone in relation to other major oceanic zones.

This is a list of submarine topographical features, oceanic landforms and topographic elements.

== Abyssal plain ==
An abyssal plain is an underwater plain on the deep ocean floor, usually found at depths between 3,000 and 6,000 meters (9,800 and 19,700 ft). Lying generally between the foot of a continental rise and a mid-ocean ridge, abyssal plains are among the flattest, smoothest and least explored regions on Earth. Abyssal plains are key geologic elements of oceanic basins (the other elements being an elevated mid-ocean ridge and flanking abyssal hills). In addition to these elements, active oceanic basins (those that are associated with a moving plate tectonic boundary) also typically include an oceanic trench and a subduction zone. Abyssal plains cover more than 33% of the ocean floor (about 23% of Earth's surface), but they are poorly preserved in the sedimentary record because they tend to be consumed by the subduction process.

The abyssal plain is formed when the lower oceanic crust is melted and forced upwards by the asthenosphere layer of the upper mantle. As this basaltic material reaches the surface at mid-ocean ridges, it forms new oceanic crust. Abyssal plains result from the blanketing of an originally uneven surface of oceanic crust by fine-grained sediments, mainly clay and silt. Much of this sediment is deposited from turbidity currents that have been channeled from the continental margins along submarine canyons down into deeper water. The remainder of the sediment is composed chiefly of pelagic sediments.

Use of a continuously recording fathometer enabled Ivan Tolstoy & Maurice Ewing in the summer of 1947 to identify and describe the first abyssal plain. This plain, located to the south of Newfoundland, is now known as the Sohm Abyssal Plain. Following this discovery many other examples were found in all the oceans.

=== List of abyssal plains and oceanic basins ===
Following is a list of named abyssal plains and oceanic basins:

Name	Alternate name	Ocean	Coordinates
Adriatic Abyssal Plain	(Adriatic Basin)	Mediterranean	43°0′N 15°0′E
Agulhas Bank	(Agulhas Basin)	South Atlantic Ocean	35°30′S 21°00′E
Alaska Plain	(Alaskan Abyssal Plain, Alaskan Plain)	North Pacific Ocean	55°0′N 143°0′W
Alborán Plain	(Alboran Abyssal Plain)	Alboran Sea (Mediterranean Sea)	35°55′N 3°50′W
Aleutian Basin	(Aleutskaya Kotlovina, Bering Abyssal Plain, Bering Basin, Bering Sea Basin)	North Pacific Ocean	57°0′N 177°0′E
Amerasia Basin	(Central Polar Basin; consists of the Canada Basin and the Makarov Basin)		
Amundsen Basin	(Amundsen Basin)	Arctic Ocean	89°0′N 80°0′E
Amundsen Plain	(Amundsen Abyssal Plain)	Southern Ocean	65°0′S 125°0′W
Angola Plain	(Angola Abyssal Plain, Angola Basin)	South Atlantic Ocean	15°0′S 2°0′E
Argentine Abyssal Plain	(Argentine Plain, Argentine Basin)	South Atlantic Ocean	47°30′S 50°0′W
Atlantic-Indian Basin		Indian Ocean	60°0′S 15°0′E
Balearic Abyssal Plain		Mediterranean Sea	40°00′N 01°30′E
Baffin Basin	(Baffin Bay Basin)	North Atlantic Ocean	73°15′N 67°0′W
Barracuda Plain	(Barracuda Abyssal Plain)	North Atlantic Ocean	17°0′N 56°30′W
Bauer Basin			
Bellingshausen Plain	(Bellingshausen Abyssal Plain)	Southern Ocean	64°0′S 90°0′W
Biscay Plain	(Biscay Abyssal Plain)	North Atlantic Ocean	45°0′N 7°15′W
Blake Basin	(Blake Abyssal Plain)	North Atlantic Ocean	29°30′N 76°4′W
Boreas Plain	(Boreas Abyssal Plain)	Arctic Ocean	77°0′N 1°0′E
Burdwood Abyssal Plain		South Atlantic Ocean	
Canada Plain	(Canada Abyssal Plain, Canada Basin, Canada Deep, Canadian Plain, Kanadskaya Abissal'naya Ravnina Kanadskaya). One of two sub-basins of the Amerasia Basin.	Arctic Ocean	80°0′N 140°0′W
Canary Basin			
Cape Plain	(Cape Abyssal Plain, Cape Basin)	South Atlantic Ocean	34°45′S 6°0′E
Cape Verde Plain	(Cape Verde Abyssal Plain)	North Atlantic Ocean	23°0′N 26°0′W
Cascadia Plain	(Cascadia Abyssal Plain, Cascadia Basin, Bassin Cascadia, Great Trough)	North Pacific Ocean	47°0′N 127°30′W
Ceará Plain	(Brazil Basin, Ceara Abyssal Plain)	North Atlantic Ocean	0°0′N 36°30′W
Central Pacific Basin			
Ceylon Plain	(Ceylon Abyssal Plain)	Indian Ocean	4°0′S 82°0′E
Chile Basin			
Chukchi Plain	(Chukchi Abyssal Plain)	Arctic Ocean	77°0′N 172°0′W
Cocos Abyssal Plain	(Cocos Basin)	Indian Ocean	
Colombian Plain	(Colombia Abyssal Plain, Colombian Abyssal Plain)	Caribbean (Atlantic Ocean)	13°0′N 76°0′W
Comoro Plain	(Comores Abyssal Plain)	Mozambique Channel (Indian Ocean)	13°45′S 44°30′E
Cuvier Plain	(Cuvier Abyssal Plain)	Indian Ocean	22°0′S 111°0′E
Demerara Plain	(Demerara Abyssal Plain)	North Atlantic Ocean	10°0′N 48°0′W
Dibble Basin		Southern Ocean	65°20′S 133°0′E
Dumshaf Plain	(Dumshaf Abyssal Plain)	Arctic Ocean	68°0′N 5°0′E
Enderby Plain	(Enderby Abyssal Plain, East Abyssal Plain)	Southern Ocean	60°0′S 40°0′E
Eratosthenes Abyssal Plain	(Eratosthenes Seamount)	Mediterranean Sea	33°40′N 32°40′E
Eurasian Basin	(Norway Abyssal Plain, Norwegian Basin; consists of the Amundsen Basin and the Nansen Basin)	Arctic Ocean	80°N 90°E
Euxine Abyssal Plain		Black Sea	
Fernando de Noronha Plain	(Fernando de Noronha Abyssal Plain, Planicie Abissal de Fernando de Noronha)	South Atlantic Ocean	3°0′S 31°0′W
Ferradura Plain	(Ferradura Abyssal Plain, Planicie Abissal da Ferradura)	North Atlantic Ocean	36°0′N 10°45′W
Fletcher Plain	(Abissal'naya Ravnina Fletchera)	Arctic Ocean	86°0′N 179°59′W
Florida Plain	(Florida Abyssal Plain)	Gulf of Mexico (Atlantic Ocean)	25°30′N 86°0′W
Fram Basin	(Barents Abyssal Plain, Barents Plain) One of two sub-basins of the Eurasian Basin.	Arctic Ocean	83°0′N 35°0′E
Gambia Plain	(Gambia Abyssal Plain, Gambia Basin)	North Atlantic Ocean	12°0′N 28°0′W
Gascoyne Plain	(Exmouth Abyssal Plain, Gascogne Plain, Gascoyne Abyssal Plain)	Indian Ocean	16°0′S 110°0′E
Greenland Plain	(Greenland Abyssal Plain, Iceland Basin, Plaine du Groenland)	Arctic Ocean	75°0′N 3°0′W
Grenada Abyssal Plain		Caribbean Sea (Atlantic Ocean)	
Guiana Basin			
Guinea Plain	(Guinea Abyssal Plain)	North Atlantic Ocean	1°0′N 3°0′W
Hatteras Plain	(Hatteras Abyssal Plain)	North Atlantic Ocean	31°0′N 71°0′W
Herodotus Basin	(Herodotus Abyssal Plain, Herodotus Plain)	Levantine Sea (Mediterranean Sea)	33°0′N 28°0′E
Hellenic Trench	(Metapan Deep System)	Ionian Sea	36°23′N 22°38′E
Hispaniola Plain	(Hispaniola Abyssal Plain)	North Atlantic Ocean	20°18′N 71°35′W
Horseshoe Plain	(Horseshoe Abyssal Plain)	North Atlantic Ocean	35°40′N 12°20′W
Iberian Plain	(Iberia Abyssal Plain, Iberian Abyssal Plain)	North Atlantic Ocean	43°45′N 13°30′W
Jamaican Abyssal Plain		Caribbean Sea (Atlantic Ocean)	
Japan Plain	(Japan Abyssal Plain)	Sea of Japan (Pacific Ocean)	41°30′N 135°0′E
JOIDES Basin		Southern Ocean	74°30′S 174°0′E
Labrador Basin	(Labrador Sea Basin)	North Atlantic Ocean	53°0′N 48°0′W
Laurentian Abyss		North Atlantic Ocean	
Lichte Trough		Antarctica Ocean	76°25′S 30°0′W
Madeira Abyssal Plain	(Madeira Plain)	North Atlantic Ocean	32°0′N 21°0′W
Makarov Basin	one of two sub-basins of the Amerasia Basin.	Arctic Ocean	
Mascarene Plain	(Madagascar Basin, Malagasy Abyssal Plain, Seychelles-Mauritius Plateau)	Indian Ocean	19°0′S 52°0′E
Melanesian Basin			
Mendeleyev Plain	(Mendeleyev Abyssal Plain)	Arctic Ocean	81°0′N 170°0′W
Mid Indian Abyssal Plain	(Mid-Indian Basin)	Indian Ocean	
Mornington Abyssal Plain		South Pacific Ocean	
Namibia Abyssal Plain		South Atlantic Ocean	
Nansen Basin	One of two sub-basins of the Eurasian Basin.	Arctic Ocean	
Nares Plain	(Fosse Nares, Nares Abyssal Plain, Nares Deep, Nares Tiefe)	North Atlantic Ocean	23°30′N 63°0′W
Natal Basin			
Newfoundland Basin		North Atlantic Ocean	43°30′N 45°0′W
North Australian Basin	(Argo Abyssal Plain, Bassin Nord de l' Australie, Severo-Avstralijskaja Kotlovina)	Indian Ocean	14°30′S 116°30′E
North Polar Basin	(consists of the Amerasia Basin and the Eurasian Basin)		
Northwest Pacific Basin			
Northwind Plain USCGC Northwind (WAGB-282)	(Northwind Abyssal Plain)	Arctic Ocean	76°0′N 161°0′W
Okhotsk Abyssal Plain		Sea of Okhotsk (western Pacific Ocean)	
Oman Plain	(Arabian Basin, Oman Abyssal Plain)	Arabian Sea (Indian Ocean)	23°0′N 61°0′E
Panama Plain	(Clark Abyssal Plain)	Caribbean Sea (Atlantic Ocean)	11°0′N 79°0′W
Papua Plain	(Papua Abyssal Plain)	South Pacific Ocean	14°0′S 151°30′E
Para Abyssal Plain		North Atlantic Ocean	
Penrhyn Basin			
Pernambuco Plain	(Pernambuco Abyssal Plain)	South Atlantic Ocean	7°30′S 27°0′W
Perth Plain	(Perth Abyssal Plain, Perth Basin, West Australian Basin)	Indian Ocean	28°30′S 110°0′E
Peru Basin			
Pole Plain	(Central Polar Basin, Pole Abyssal Plain)	Arctic Ocean	89°0′N 45°0′E
Porcupine Abyssal Plain	(Porcupine Plain, West European Plain)	North Atlantic Ocean	49°0′N 16°0′W
Raukumara Abyssal Plain		South Pacific Ocean	
Rhodes Basin	(Rhodes Abyssal Plain, Ró2dhos Basin)	Sea of Crete (Mediterranean Sea)	35°55′N 28°30′E
Roggeveen Basin			
Sardino-Balearic Plain	(Algerian Plain, Balearic Abyssal Plain, Balearic Plain, Sardino-Balearic Abyssal Plain)	Mediterranean Sea	39°0′N 6°20′E
Seine Plain	(Seine Abyssal Plain)	North Atlantic Ocean	34°0′N 12°15′W
Siberian Abyssal Plain		Arctic Ocean	
Sicilia Plain	(Messina Abyssal Plain, Sicily Plain)	Mediterranean Sea	36°0′N 18°0′E
Sierra Leone Plain	(Sierra Leone Abyssal Plain, Sierra Leone Basin)	North Atlantic Ocean	5°0′N 17°0′W
Sigsbee Deep	(Mexico Basin, Sigsbee Abyssal Plain, Sigsbee Deep, Sigsbee Basin)	Gulf of Mexico (Atlantic Ocean)	23°30′N 93°0′W
Silver Plain	(Silver Abyssal Plain)	North Atlantic Ocean	22°30′N 69°30′W
Sirte Basin	(Ionian Abyssal Plain, Sidra Abyssal Plain, Sidra Plain, Sirte Abyssal Plain, Surt Plain)	Libyan Sea (Mediterranean Sea)	34°10′N 19°22′E
Sohm Abyssal Plain	(Fosse de Suhm, Plaine Sohm, Sohm Deep, Sohm Plain, Suhm Abyssal Plain, Suhm Deep, Suhm Plain)	North Atlantic Ocean	36°0′N 55°0′W
Somali Plain	(Somali Abyssal Plain, Somali Basin)	Indian Ocean	1°0′N 51°30′E
South Australian Plain	(Eyre Abyssal Plain, Great Bight Abyssal Plain, South Australian Abyssal Plain)	Indian Ocean	37°30′S 130°0′E
South China Basin	(South China Sea Abyssal Plain)	South China Sea (Pacific Ocean)	15°0′N 115°0′E
Southeast Pacific Basin			
South Fiji Basin			
South Indian Plain	(South Indian Abyssal Plain, South Indian Basin, South Indian Ocean Plain)	Southern Ocean	59°0′S 125°0′E
South West Pacific Abyssal Plain	(South West Pacific Basin)	South Pacific Ocean	
Tagus Abyssal Plain	(Tagus Plain)	North Atlantic Ocean	37°30′N 12°0′W
Tasman Abyssal Plain	(Tasman Plain, Eastern Australian Abyss, Tasman Basin)	Tasman Sea (South Pacific Ocean)	34°30′S 153°15′E
Town Abyssal Plain		South Atlantic Ocean	
Tsushima Basin	(Ulleung Basin)	Korea Strait (Sea of Japan, Pacific Ocean)	36°35′N 131°48′E
Tufts Plain	(Tufts Abyssal Plain)	North Pacific Ocean	47°0′N 140°0′W
Tyrrhenian Plain	(Tyrrhenian Abyssal Plain)	Tyrrhenian Sea (Mediterranean Sea)	40°0′N 12°45′E
Valdivia Abyssal Plain		Southern Ocean	62°30′S 70°0′E
Venezuelan Plain	(Venezuela Abyssal Plain)	Caribbean Sea (Atlantic Ocean)	14°0′N 67°0′W
Vidal Abyssal Plain		North Atlantic Ocean	
Weddell Plain	(Weddell Abyssal Plain)	Southern Ocean	65°0′S 20°0′W
Wrangellia Terrane	(Wrangel Abyssal Plain)	Arctic Ocean	81°0′N 160°0′E
Yamato Basin		Sea of Japan (Pacific Ocean)	37°30′N 135°0′E
Yucatán Abyssal Plain	(Guatemala Basin)	Caribbean Sea (Atlantic Ocean)	

== Oceanic trenches ==
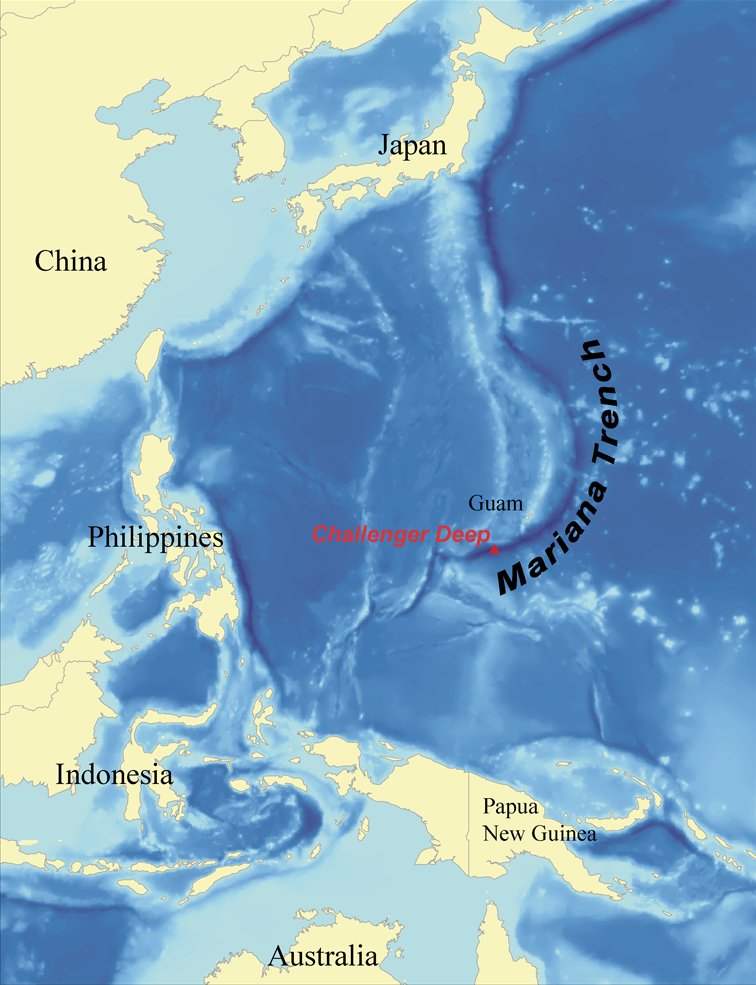
Location of the Challenger Deep in the Mariana Trench

Oceanic trenches are long, narrow topographic depressions of the seabed. They are the deepest parts of the ocean floor, and they define one of the most important natural boundaries on the Earth's solid surface: the one between two lithospheric plates. Trenches are a distinctive morphological feature of plate boundaries. Trenches are found in all oceans with the exception of the Arctic Ocean and they are most common in the North and South Pacific Oceans.

There are three types of lithospheric plate boundaries: 1.) divergent (where lithosphere and oceanic crust is created at mid-ocean ridges), 2.) convergent (where one lithospheric plate sinks beneath another and returns to the mantle), and 3.) transform (where two lithospheric plates slide past each other).

An oceanic trench is a type of convergent boundary at which two oceanic lithospheric slabs meet; the older (and therefore denser) of these slabs flexes and subducts beneath the other slab. Oceanic lithosphere moves into trenches at a global rate of about a tenth of a square meter per second. Trenches are generally parallel to a volcanic island arc, and about 200 km from a volcanic arc. Oceanic trenches typically extend 3 to 4 km (1.9 to 2.5 mi) below the level of the surrounding oceanic floor. The greatest ocean depth to be sounded is in the Challenger Deep of the Mariana Trench, at a depth of around 10,935 metres (35,876 feet) below sea level.

=== List of oceanic trenches ===
The following is a list of the deepest parts of the Earth's oceans and seas (all depths are measured from sea level):

	Name	Location	Depth (meters)	Depth (feet)	Depth (miles)
1	Challenger Deep	Izu–Bonin–Mariana Arc, Mariana Trench, Pacific Ocean	10,935	35,876	6.80
2	Tonga Trench	Pacific Ocean	10,882	35,702	6.76
3	Emden Deep	Philippine Trench, Pacific Ocean	10,545	34,580	6.54
4	Kuril–Kamchatka Trench	Pacific Ocean	10,542	34,449	6.52
5	Kermadec Trench	Pacific Ocean	10,047	32,963	6.24
6	Izu–Ogasawara Trench	Pacific Ocean	9,810	32,087	6.08
7	Japan Trench	Pacific Ocean	9,000	29,527	5.59
8	Puerto Rico Trench	Atlantic Ocean	8,605	28,232	5.35
9	Yap Trench	Pacific Ocean	8,527	27,976	5.30
10	Richards Deep	Peru–Chile Trench, Pacific Ocean	8,065	26,456	5.01
11	Diamantina Deep	Diamantina fracture zone, Indian Ocean	8,047	26,401	5.00
12	Romanche Trench	Atlantic Ocean	7,760	25,460	4.82
13	Cayman Trough	Caribbean	7,687	25,238	4.78
14	Aleutian Trench	Pacific Ocean	7,679	25,194	4.77
15	Sunda Trench	Indian Ocean	7,455	24,460	4.63
16	Weber Deep	Banda Sea	7,351	24,117	4.56
17	South Sandwich Trench	Atlantic Ocean	7,431	24,380	4.62
18	Dordrecht Deep	Indian Ocean	7,019	23,028	4.36
19	Middle America Trench	Pacific Ocean	6,669	21,880	4.14
20	Puysegur Trench	Pacific Ocean	6,300	20,700	3.9
21	Vityaz Trench	Pacific Ocean	6,150	20,177	3.8
22	Sulu Trench	South China Sea	5,600	18,400	3.48
23	Litke Deep	Eurasian Basin^{*}, Arctic Ocean	5,450	17,881	3.39
24	Manila Trench	South China Sea	5,400	17,700	3.36
25	Calypso Deep	Hellenic Trench, Mediterranean	5,267	17,280	3.27
26	Ryukyu Trench	Pacific Ocean	5,212	17,100	3.24
27	Murray Canyon^{*}	Southern Ocean, Australia	5,000	16,400	3.1

^* Entries marked are the deepest parts of their respective water bodies, but are not oceanic trenches.

== Oceanic plateau ==
An oceanic plateau is a large, relatively flat submarine region that rises well above the level of the ambient seabed. While many oceanic plateaus are composed of continental crust, and often form a step interrupting the continental slope, some plateaus are undersea remnants of large igneous provinces. Continental crust has the highest amount of silicon (such rock is called felsic). Oceanic crust has a smaller amount of silicon (mafic rock).

The anomalous volcanism associated with the formation of oceanic plateaux at the time of the Cenomanian–Turonian boundary (90.4 million years) ago may have been responsible for the environmental disturbances that occurred at that time. The physical manifestations of this were elevated atmospheric and oceanic temperatures, a significant sea-level transgression, and a period of widespread anoxia, leading to the extinction of 26% of all genera. These eruptions would also have resulted in the emission of large quantities of carbon dioxide into the atmosphere, leading to global warming. Additionally, the emission of sulfur monoxide, hydrogen sulfide, carbon monoxide, and halogens into the oceans would have made seawater more acidic resulting in the dissolution of carbonate, and further release of CO_{2}. This runaway greenhouse effect was probably put into reverse by the decline of the anomalous volcanic activity and by increased CO_{2}-driven productivity in oceanic surface waters, leading to increased organic carbon burial, black shale deposition, anoxia and mass extinction in the ocean basins.

Map of the Zealandia microcontinent, showing Alpine Fault, Bounty Trough, Campbell Plateau, Challenger Plateau, Chatham Rise, Havre Trough, Hikurangi Plateau, Kermadec Trench, Lord Howe Rise, Louisville Ridge, New Caledonia Basin, Norfolk Ridge, South Fiji Basin, South West Pacific Basin, and Tasman Basin.

=== List of oceanic plateaus ===
- Campbell Plateau (South Pacific)
- Challenger Plateau (South Pacific)
- Agulhas Plateau (Southwest Indian)
- Caribbean–Colombian Plateau (Caribbean)
- Exmouth Plateau (Indian)
- Hikurangi Plateau (Southwest Pacific)
- Kerguelen Plateau (Indian)
- Manihiki Plateau (Southwest Pacific)
- Marquesas Plateau (Southwest Pacific)
- Mascarene Plateau (Indian)
- Naturaliste Plateau (Indian)
- Ontong Java Plateau (Southwest Pacific)
- Shatsky Rise (North Pacific)
- Vøring Plateau (North Atlantic)
- Wrangellia Terrane (Northeast Pacific)
- Yermak Plateau (Arctic)

== Mid-ocean ridges ==
A mid-ocean ridge is a general term for an underwater mountain system that consists of various mountain ranges (chains), typically having a valley known as a rift running along its spine, formed by plate tectonics. This type of oceanic ridge is characteristic of what is known as an oceanic spreading center, which is responsible for seafloor spreading.

=== List of mid-ocean ridges ===
- Aden Ridge
- American–Antarctic Ridge
- Carlsberg Ridge
- Central Indian Ridge
- Chile Rise
- Cocos Ridge
- East Pacific Rise
- East Scotia Ridge
- Explorer Ridge
- Gakkel Ridge (Mid-Arctic Ridge)
- Gorda Ridge
- Juan de Fuca Ridge
- Knipovich Ridge (between Greenland and Spitsbergen)
- Kolbeinsey Ridge (North of Iceland)
- Mid-Atlantic Ridge
- Mohns Ridge
- Norfolk Ridge
- Pacific–Antarctic Ridge
- Palau–Kyushu Ridge
- Reykjanes Ridge (south of Iceland)
- Southeast Indian Ridge
- Southwest Indian Ridge
- West Mariana Ridge

== See also ==
- Physical oceanography
- Bathymetry
- Challenger Deep
- Hadal zone
- List of oceanic landforms
- List of submarine volcanoes
- Seamount
- Submarine canyon
