= Continental shelf of Brazil =

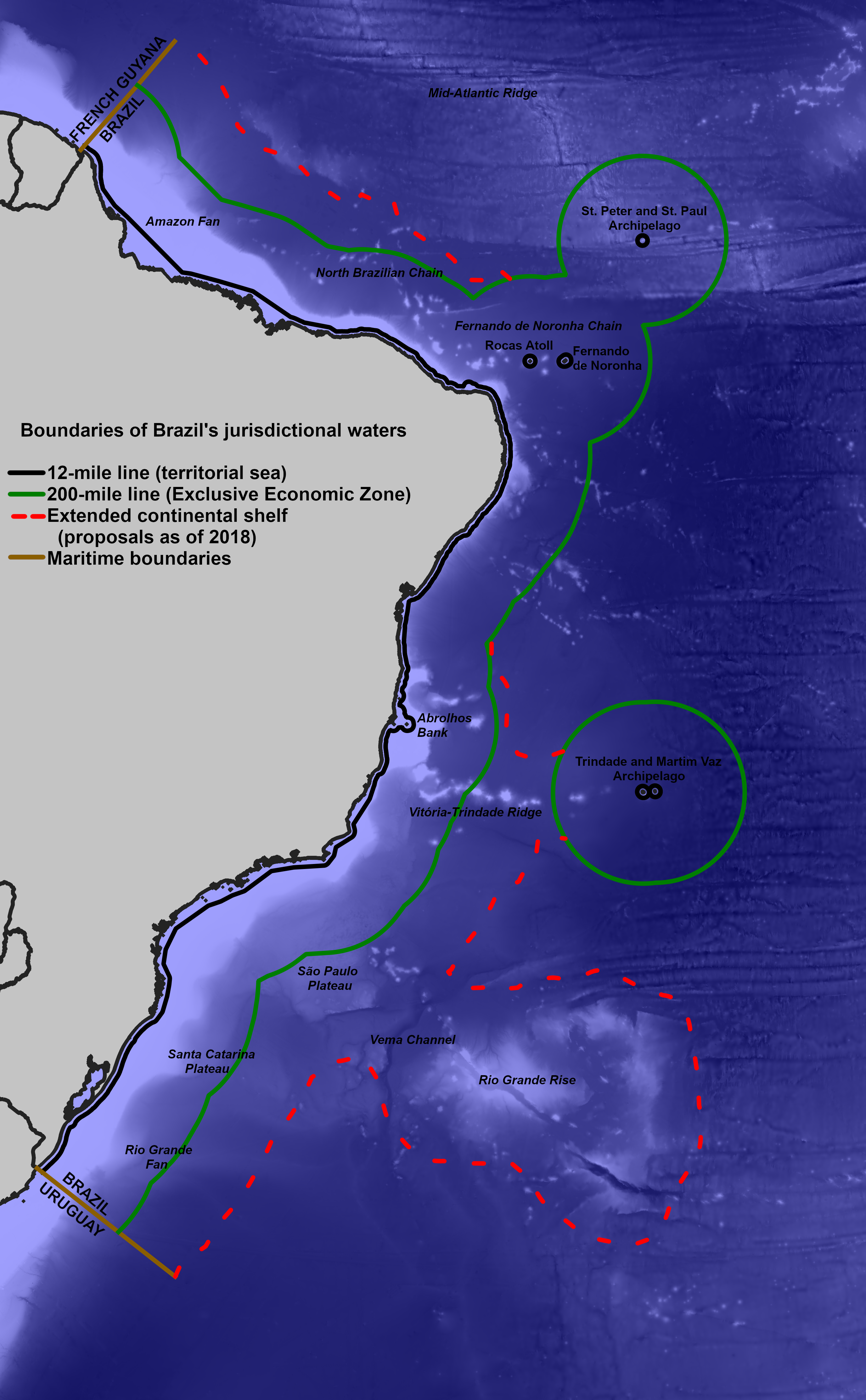
In green, the 200-nautical mile limit, under which the soil and subsoil are recognized parts of the continental shelf; in dotted red, the proposed extension

The continental shelf of Brazil is the seabed and subsoil underlying its jurisdictional waters, where the country has sovereign rights over natural resources as a party to the United Nations Convention on the Law of the Sea (UNCLOS). An area of 3.5 million square kilometers as far as 200 nautical miles (370 kilometres) from baselines along the coast is internationally recognized as such. From 2004 to 2018 Brazil submitted a series of extended continental shelf proposals beyond the 200 nautical mile line to the Commission on the Limits of the Continental Shelf (CLCS). The proposed extended shelf measures 2,094,656.59 km². A final understanding has yet to be reached with the CLCS, and therefore the outer limits of the extended shelf are still not final and binding. The Brazilian Navy includes the continental shelf in its concept of a "Blue Amazon".

The concept of a continental shelf was introduced to Brazilian law in 1950, although lacking a clear limit. In the beginning of the following decade, it was the point of contention in the "Lobster War" with France. The 1970 extension of the territorial sea to 200 nautical miles from the coast subsumed the shelf's distinct existence, as the territorial sea includes the seabed and subsoil. When the UNCLOS came into force in 1994, the territorial sea was reduced and the shelf's outer limit now matched that of the exclusive economic zone (EEZ). Offshore oil drilling began in the continental shelf over this period and since then it provides most of Brazil's fossil fuel production.

In order to substantiate its proposals of a continental shelf beyond the 200-nautical mile line, since the late 1980s the Brazilian Navy, Petrobras and the country's scientific community joined in the Brazilian Continental Shelf Survey Plan (LEPLAC) to retrieve hundreds of thousands of kilometers of geological profiles in the area. In 2007 the CLCS only accepted part of the Brazilian proposal and a new cycle of surveys began in response. Economic interest in the region grew after the discovery of fossil fuel deposits in the pre-salt layer of underwater sedimentary basins, thanks to which Brazil became the world's 8th largest crude oil and lease condensate producer in 2023. Revised proposals are larger and in 2018 covered the mineral-rich Rio Grande Rise.

Geologically, Brazil's legal continental shelf mostly corresponds to a divergent continental margin formed by the split between South America and Africa, with a well-defined shelf, slope and rise. It is at its widest off the Northern coast, where the Amazon River forms one of the world's largest submarine fans. The margin narrows through the Northeast and widens again south of the Abrolhos Bank. The São Paulo Plateau, which is the largest marginal plateau in the Brazilian coast, contains its two richest oil basins (Campos and Santos). Beyond fossil fuels, the continental margin also has mineral reserves of coal, gas hydrates, aggregates, heavy mineral sands, phosphorite, evaporites, sulphur, cobalt-rich ferromanganese crusts, polymetallic sulfides and polymetallic nodules, which are almost entirely untouched by undersea mining.

== Geomorphology ==
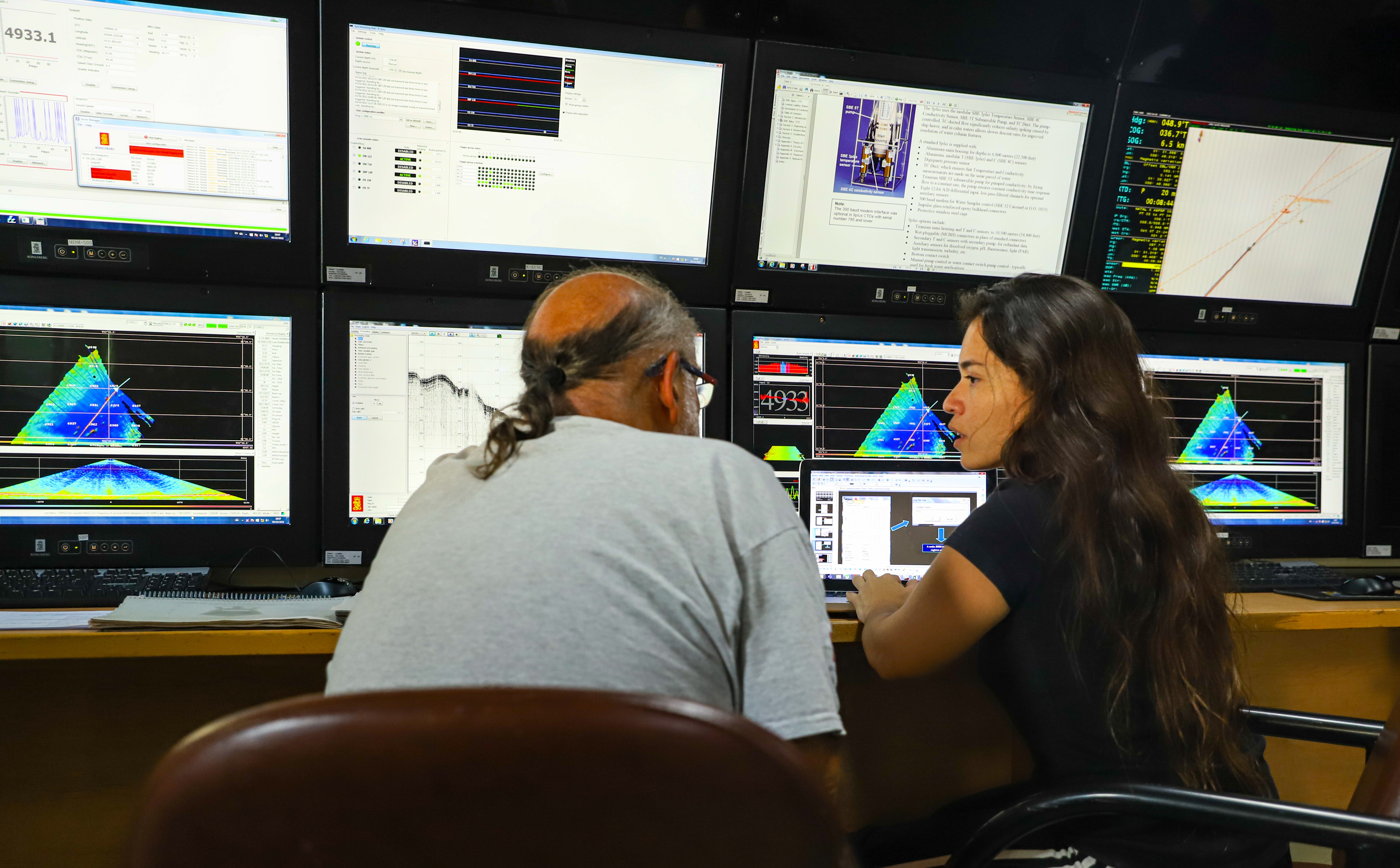
Fluminense Federal University researchers analyse a bathymetric survey conducted by the research vessel Vital de Oliveira (H-39)

From the Brazilian coast until the abyssal plains of the South Atlantic lies a portion of the South American continental margin, which is the transition between continental and oceanic crusts. When comparing terminology between maritime law and geography, this continental margin, which comprises a continental shelf, continental slope and continental rise, is the closest geological counterpart to a "continental shelf" as defined in the UNCLOS. The legal shelf is the entire natural projection of a coastal state into the seafloor and not just its geomorphological shelf.

Most of the Brazilian continental margin is a classical divergent margin formed by the breakup of the supercontinent of Gondwana and its South American and African plates. This kind of margin possesses a large continental shelf and a steep but stable incline at its slope, where accumulated sediments form the continental rise, which gently slides down with decreasing thickness until the abyssal plains. Several tectonic and sedimentary processes mean these three strips are not always neatly visible, and not all of the Brazilian continental margin is the divergent South Atlantic: the far north is in the divergent Central Atlantic, and part of the equatorial region is a transform margin, in which two plates slide against each other.

20.5% of the exclusive economic zone (EEZ)'s seafloor is at depths of up to 200 m, which may be considered part of the continental shelf. Deep-sea features cover the rest: the continental slope (13.3%), terraces (1.7%), submarine canyons (1.4%), the continental rise (40%), abyssal plains (29.6%), submarine fans (4.9%), seamounts (2.2%), guyots (1.4%), ridges (1.2%) and spreading ridges (1.4%). These percentages add up to more than 100%, as some features occupy the same spaces.

=== Submarine features ===
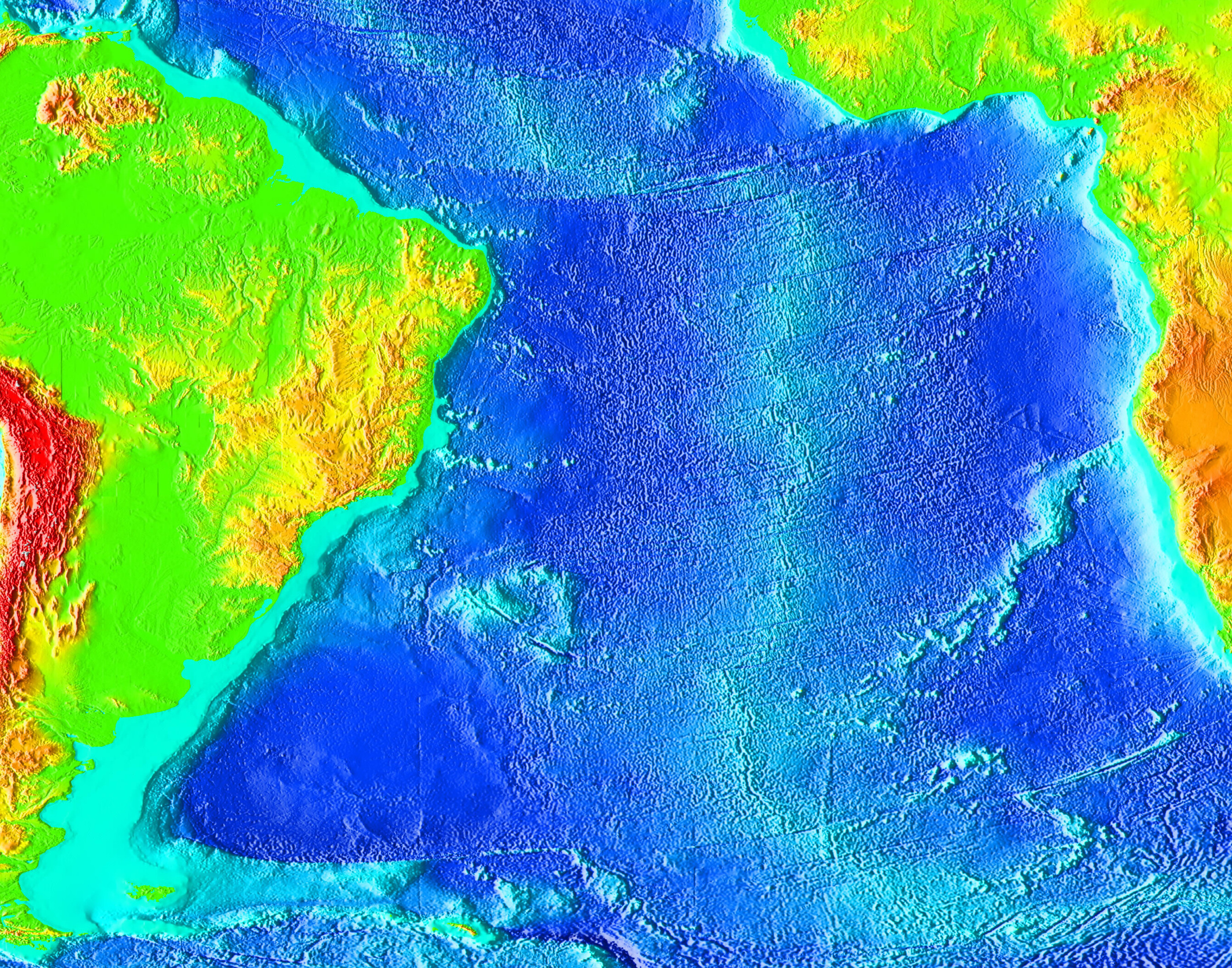
Bathymetric map of the South Atlantic

Following the Brazilian coast from the north, the first major feature is the Amazon Fan. Outflow from the river forms the thickest sediment beds and the widest geomorphological shelf (up to 300 km) and margin (750 km) in the entire coast. Bathymetry follows a gradient all the way to depths of 4.800 m in the Demerara Abyssal Plain. To the east lie the Maranhão Seamounts and the North Brazilian and Fernando de Noronha ridges, formed parallel to the coast by the Equatorial Atlantic's transform margin. The Fernando de Noronha Chain breaks the surface in two regions, Rocas Atoll and the Fernando de Noronha Archipelago. The North Brazilian chain is a barrier to sediment deposition and thus shortens the width of the continental margin and its resulting legal claims. The Saint Peter and Saint Paul Archipelago is geologically distinct: an emerged portion of the Mid-Atlantic Ridge, composed of mantle rocks exposed to the surface when tectonic forces opened faults in the oceanic crust.

The continental shelf measures 170 km in width at the Parnaíba River's delta, narrows to 50 km in the east, at the coast of Ceará, and even more until Cape São Roque, no Rio Grande do Norte. The Northeast has the narrowest stretches of continental margin (100 km) and geomorphological shelf (30–50 km), down to a mere 8 km of shelf off the coast in Recife. From the 10th to the 16th parallel south, this is owed to the influence of the São Francisco Craton. The continental rise descends until the Brazil abyssal plain, with several features perpendicular to the coast, from north to south: the Rio Grande do Norte, Paraíba, Pernambuco and Bahia seamounts and the Ferraz Ridge. The continental margin widens again from Abrolhos Bank, which the Besnard Bank connects to the Vitória-Trindade Ridge, a sequence of about 30 seamounts extending 950 km to east and peaking at their eastern end in the islands of Trindade and Martim Vaz.

Further south, the continental margin exceeds 500 km in width. The Campos, Santos and Paraná sedimentary basins comprise the São Paulo Plateau, the largest marginal plateau in the Brazilian coast, which is placed between the continental slope and rise. Its outer limits meet the Jean Charcot Seamounts and the São Paulo Channel. The Vema Channel and the Rio Grande Rise (RGR) define the Brazil Abyssal Plain's southern limit, separating it from the Argentine Abyssal Plain. The RGR spans the 28th to the 34th parallel south, in a total area of 500 thousand km^{2}, emerging from a seabed 5,000 m below sea level to 650 m at its highest. Its origin and evolution are controversial. It is aligned to the Paraná and Etendeka Traps and the Walvis, Gough and Tristan da Cunha ridges. In the past, some portions were above sea level.

The southern continental margin, from the São Paulo Plateau to the Uruguayan maritime boundary, contains the Santa Catarina Plateau, the Rio Grande Terrace, the Pelotas Basin and the Rio Grande Fan.

== Legal definition ==
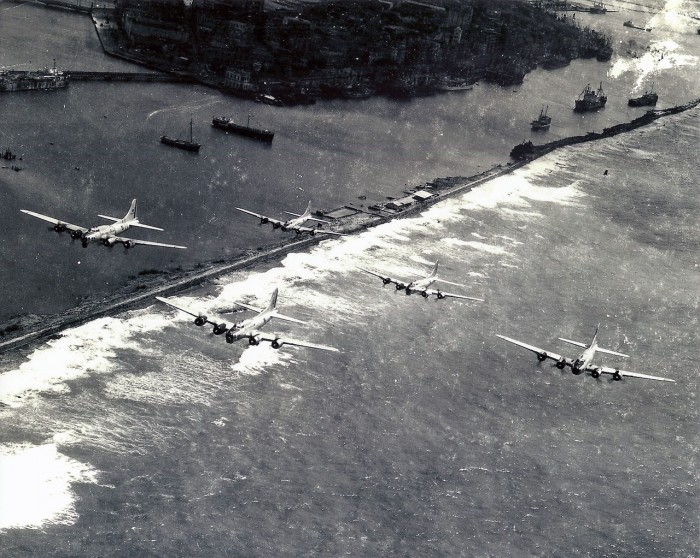
Boeing B-17 aircraft of the Brazilian Air Force overflying the coast during the Lobster War (1963)

The continental shelf was introduced in Brazilian law by decree in 1950: "the submarine shelf, in the part which corresponds to Brazil's continental and insular territory is integrated to that same territory, under exclusive jurisdiction and domain of the federal government". This legislation did not define the shelf's limits; its international precedent, Harry S. Truman's 1945 unilateral declaration of a continental shelf for the United States, went as far as a maximum depth of a 100 fathoms (180 metres). The Brazilian decree made no change to the continental shelf, which extended at the time to 3 nautical miles (5.6 kilometres) from the coast.

The 1958 Convention on the Continental Shelf, signed as a result of the 1st United Nations Convention on the Law of the Sea, consolidated the concept within international law. This agreement outlined a continental shelf as far as a depth of 200 m or wherever there were exploitable resources. "The coastal State exercises over the continental shelf sovereign rights for the purpose of exploring it and exploiting its natural resources", including its sedentary organisms. France was interested in fishing lobsters in Brazil's continental shelf and questioned the animal's classification as a sedentary species, though neither government had signed the convention. In 1963 both sides moved warships to the Brazilian Northeastern coast in what would be called the "Lobster War". Tensions calmed in the following year, domestic interest on the sea increased and the debate on lobster classification would contribute to later developments in international law.

In June 1968 a new decree established a similar definition to the convention's (200 meters in depth or wherever natural resources were exploitable, in either case outside the territorial sea). The hybrid criterion of depth and exploitability was criticized as too ambiguous since the past decade. This definition did not last; in August, another decree revoked the former and determined that the shelf's limits would follow "treaties or international conventions ratified by Brazil". As the country was not a party to the Convention on the Continental Shelf, the limit was left undefined. The 1970 extension of the territorial sea to 200 nmi (370 km) from the shore absorbed the continental shelf as a distinct area, although it was still mentioned as federal property in the Constitution. The territorial sea includes the seabed and subsoil.

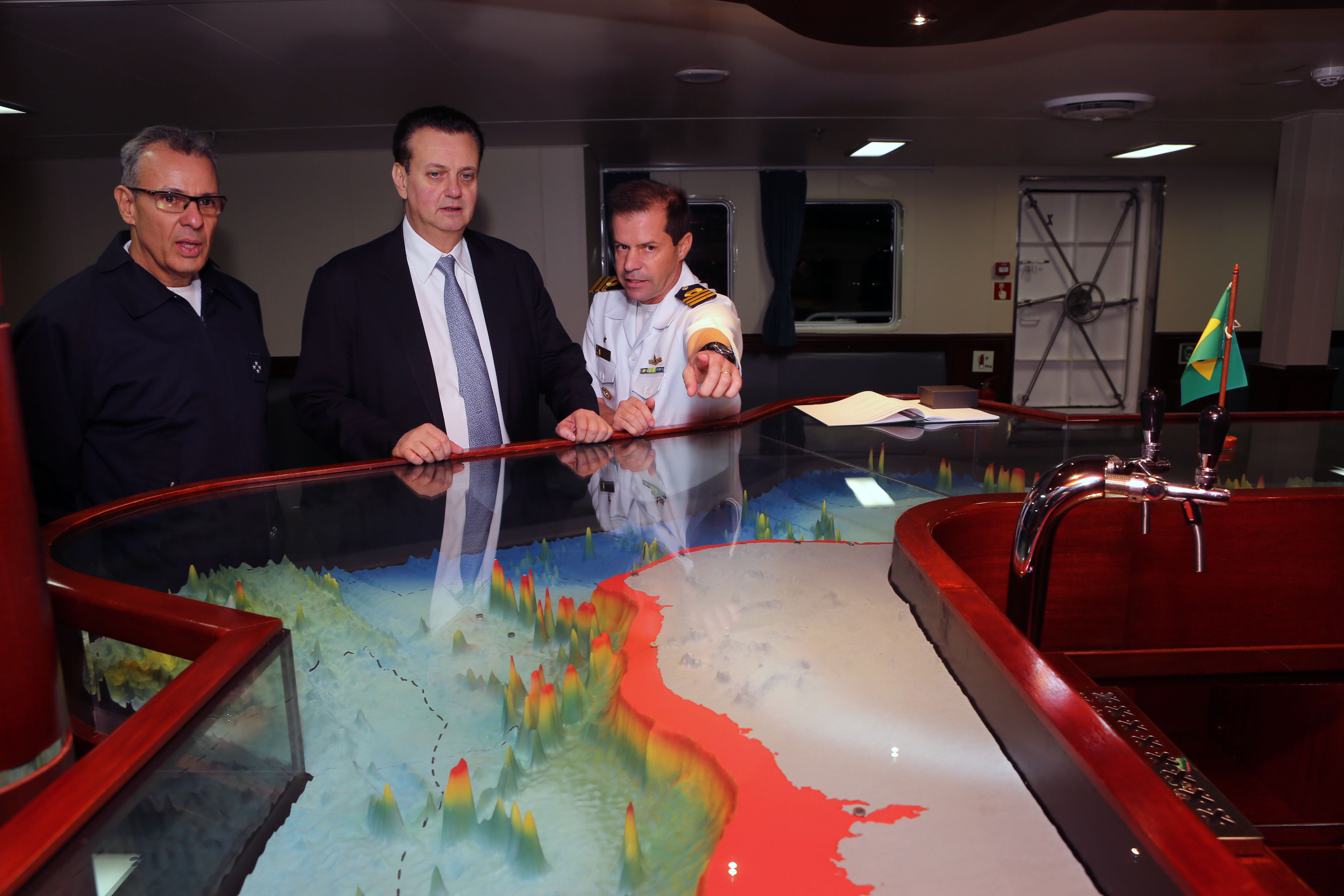
Gilberto Kassab, Minister of Science, Technology and Innovation, is presented to a bathymetric model of the Brazilian continental margin aboard the Vital de Oliveira

The 3rd UN Convention on the Law of the Sea, concluded in 1982, produced the United Nations Convention on the Law of the Sea (UNCLOS), which Brazil ratified. Adjustments to national law to comply with the UNCLOS revoked the 1970 decree and established a 12-mile territorial sea, 200-mile EEZ and a continental shelf "throughout the natural prolongation of its land territory to the outer edge of the continental margin, or to a distance of 200 nautical miles from the baselines from which the breadth of the territorial sea is measured". In effect, the shelf's outer margin remained at 200 nautical miles from coast, the same outer boundary used by the EEZ, but with a possible extended continental shelf to be recognized in the future beyond this line.

Following article 77 of the UNCLOS, "the coastal State exercises over the continental shelf sovereign rights for the purpose of exploring it and exploiting its natural resources". "If the coastal State does not explore the continental shelf or exploit its natural resources, no one may undertake these activities without the express consent of the coastal State", and these rights "do not depend on occupation, effective or notional, or on any express proclamation". International scientific research and submarine cable laying in this area are conditioned on the Brazilian government's consent.

== Extended shelf ==
Diagram of UNCLOS maritime zones

The stretch of continental shelf beyond 200 nautical miles from the baselines is known as the extended or outer continental shelf. Legally there is only one shelf and the UNCLOS, which defines the criteria for its delimitation, does not use the term. Its maximum distance is at 350 nautical miles from the baselines or 100 miles from the 2,500 m isobath. A coastal state interested in defining the outer limits of its extended shelf must submit its proposal and relevant geological information to the Commission on the Limits of the Continental Shelf (CLCS), an institution created by the UNCLOS. The CLCS is a technical, not political or legal body. Based on its recommendations, (Note: "It is not true that the CLCS approves the limits submitted by the State. The CLCS is an organ established by UNCLOS to confer, in the State's continental shelf limits submitted to the United Nations Secretary General, its technical-scientific endorsement as regards the application of UNCLOS criteria and parameters. Therefore, it is important to emphasize that the CLCS's conclusion is not the UN's approval or disapproval. This commission has no ties to the UN other than the administrative support, as provided in the UNCLOS itself, given by the Secretary-General as depositary of this international legal instrument".) the coastal state deposits the limits with the Secretary-General of the United Nations, making them final and binding. This expansion happens at the expense of the "Area", the stretch of seabed and subsoil designated in the UNCLOS as a common heritage of mankind. Part of the revenue of its natural resources is owed to the International Seabed Authority.

The applicant state may disagree with the CLCS and present a revised proposal. If it disagrees with the response to its new proposal, it may present further revisions, as many times as it wants, at the cost of finding itself stuck in a "ping pong" with the commission. Hypothetically it may also unilaterally declare its outer limits, but would face legal and political consequences. For Brazil, this could harm its relations with developing states with which it seeks closer commercial and diplomatic ties, particularly with landlocked or geographically disadvantaged states.

The continental shelf constists of seabed and subsoil, excluding the overlying water column. The waters are under a distinct legal regime. This means waters overlying the extended shelf are part of the high seas, which begins at the 200-nautical mile line. Nonetheless, legal definitions of Brazilian jurisdictional waters explicitly include the waters overlying the extended shelf, which is a contradiction with the UNCLOS according to some legal scholars. On the other hand, the state in possession of the continental shelf does have limited jurisdiction over its water column as far is its necessary to police the usage of its seabed, and Brazilian norms are moderated by the expressions "jurisdiction, to some degree", "for purposes of control and oversight" and "within the limits of national and international law".

=== Early surveys ===
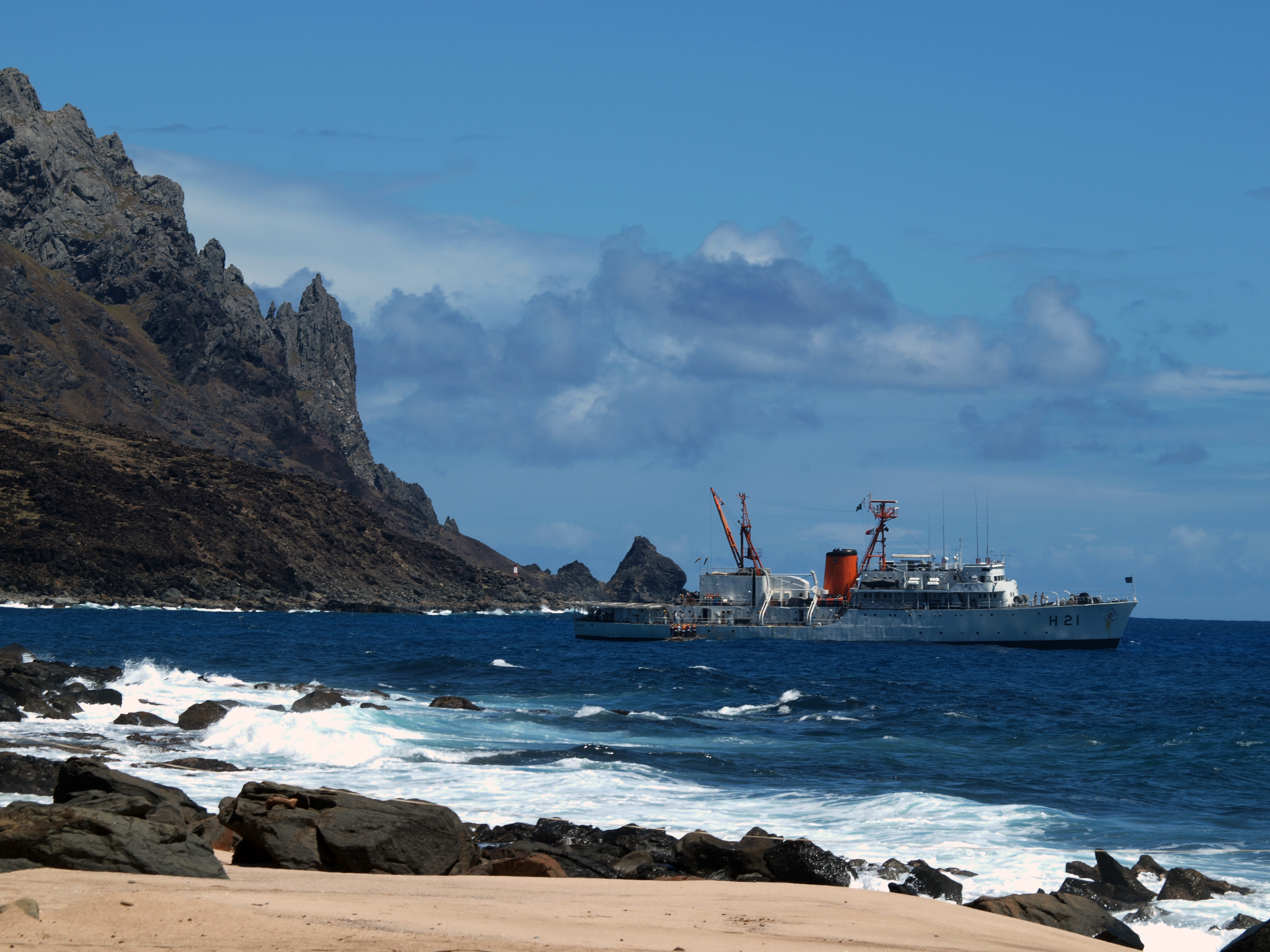
Sirius (H-21) hydrographic survey vessel at Trindade Island

Even before the UNCLOS came into force, field research to determine the outer limit of the Brazilian continental shelf begain in June 1987. Pre-existing information, such as the previous decade's Continental Margin Reconnaissance Project (Reconhecimento da Margem Continental, REMAC), had insufficient coverage, particularly far from the shore, to substantiate claims on the international sphere. In 1988 these efforts were formalized by the Interministerial Commission for Marine Resources (Comissão Interministerial para os Recursos do Mar, CIRM) in the Brazilian Continental Shelf Survey Plan (Plano de Levantamento da Plataforma Continental Brasileira, LEPLAC). LEPLAC surveys were a national project jointly put into action by the Navy through its Directorate of Hydrography and Navigation, Petrobras and the national scientific community through the Marine Geology and Geophysics Program (Programa de Geologia e Geofísica Marinha, PGGM) and several educational institutions. The Ministry of Foreign Affairs coordinated a CIRM subcommission to handle the political aspects of the extended shelf proposal.

LEPLAC's first stage lasted until 1996 and employed the military research vessels Almirante Câmara (H-41), Álvaro Alberto (H-43), Sirius (H-21) and Antares (H-40), crewed by Navy specialists, civilian researchers and, during geophysical surveys, Petrobras professionals. The expeditions collected multi-channel seismic data to determine sediment thickness in the continental margin, from the geological continental shelf until 350 nmi from the baselines. Gravimetric and magnetometric data was gathered to estimate other information, including the limit between oceanic and continental crust. Bathymetric surveys identified the foot of the continental slope, the outline of the 2,500 m isobath and new marine geomorphology models.

In total, LEPLAC's first stage collected 46,966 km of two-dimensional seismic lines and 89,369 km, 97,237 km and 93,604 km of bathymetric, gravimetric and magnetometric profiles. All assets involved were exclusively national. Beyond its immediate political objective, LEPLAC provided data for many university research programs, increased the geological and geomorphological knowledge of the Brazilian continental margin, particularly in areas of economic interest, and promoted technological development and the training of specialized personnel. The handful of civilians and military personnel at the front lines of this process have been idealized in official sources as the "bandeirantes of the salt longitudes". Technical knowledge acquired during LEPLAC would later be used to aid South American and African states in their own continental shelf surveys.

In 1997 the CIRM created the Evaluation of the Brazilian Legal Continental Shelf's Mineral Potential (Programa de Avaliação da Potencialidade Mineral da Plataforma Continental Jurídica Brasileira, REMPLAC) program to continue surveys of the continental shelf. It is coordinated by the Ministry of Mines and Energy and focuses not on the shelf's limits, but its economic potential, initially with resources located within 200 nautical miles from the baselines.

=== 2004 proposal ===
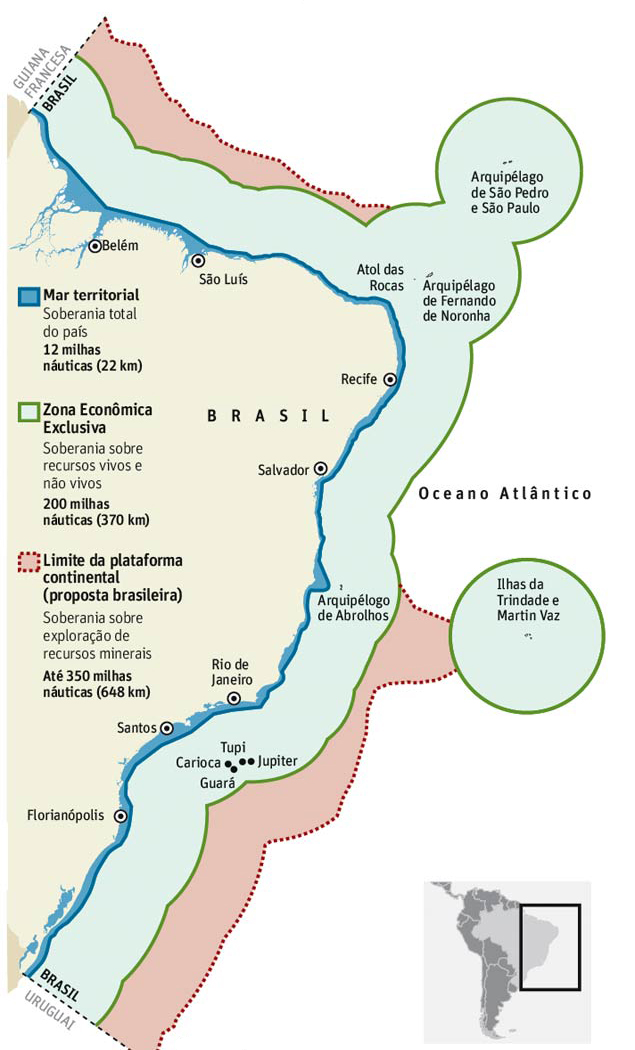
EEZ and continental shelf claims on a 2013 map

The preparation, submission and analysis of a continental shelf extension proposal is a lengthy undertaking, and the original deadline for states to submit their claims within ten years after the UNCLOS came into force (1994 to 2004) had to be extended. In December 2003 the United Nations General Assembly called on parties to the convention to hasten their proposals. As Brazil had begun its surveys early on, it became the second coastal state and the first developing nation to submit its proposal. On May 17, 2004, the Commission on the Limits of the Continental Shelf received Brazil's proposal on the outer limit of its continental shelf, alongside five CD-ROMs with the geographical coordinates of all points used to identify the limits, all based on LEPLAC's dataset.

Brazilian claims applied to an area of 911,847 km² beyond the 200 nmi line, later increased to 953,825 km² in a 2006 addendum. The total claimed area would increase from about 3.5 million km² (i.e. seabed beneath the territorial sea and EEZ) to 4.5 million. The claims were mostly in the Amazon Fan, the North Brazilian Chain, the eastern margin of the Vitória-Trindade Ridge and the São Paulo Plateau, all the way to the maritime border with Uruguay. On August 30 the United States government, despite not having signed the UNCLOS, announced its objections to the Brazilian proposal. According to the American representative at the UN, public and American datasets presented a sedimentary thickness and Gardiner line different from that given in Brazilian data. The US also questioned the association between the Vitória-Trindade Ridge and the Brazilian continental margin, contending that it was formed by an oceanic hotspot. As the US did not meet UNCLOS conditions for a third party's objection, the CLCS did not consider its arguments.

The CLCS organized a subcommission of seven specialists from Mexico, South Korea, Nigeria, China, Argentina, Croatia and Australia to examine the proposal. Brazilian specialists held five meetings with their counterparts in the CLCS, which readied a report on its recommendations in April 2007. The Commission only recognized 765,000 km² as part of the shelf. Its specialists disagreed with the proposal on the location of the foot of the slope in the Amazonas Fan and southern continental margin and doubted if the Vitória-Trindade and North Brazilian ridges could be counted as natural prolongations of the Brazilian landmass for purposes of continental shelf delimitation.

=== Strategic importance ===
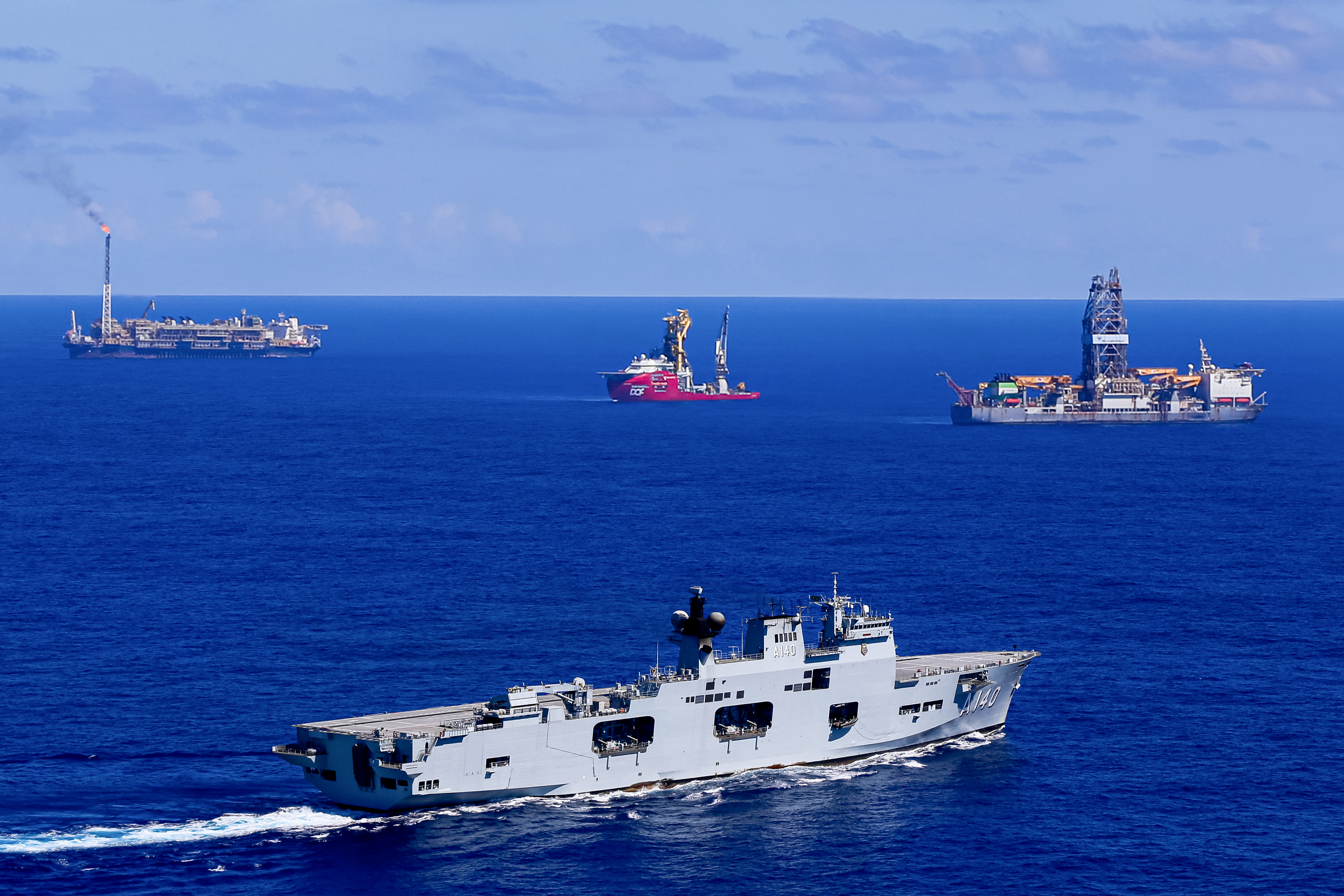
Helicopter carrier Atlântico (A-140) in the Santos Basin

Once the CLCS only accepted part of the proposal, in June 2008 the President approved the CIRM's decision to order new surveys to draft a revised proposal. The political and strategic decision was to not deposit partial limits with the Secretary-General, unlike Australia, and to only deposit limits after resolving all disagreements with the CLCS. According to sources in the Ministry of Foreign Affairs, Petrobras had lobbied for an immediate acceptance of the CLCS counterproposal, dropping maximalist claims, to immediately secure oil fields beyond the 200 nautical miles. The most important oil reserves are in the São Paulo Plateau, precisely the only region of the continental margin where the CLCS fully agreed with the Brazilian proposal.

An unnamed diplomat told the magazine IstoÉ Dinheiro that "we will not give up on our right in the name of an immediate gains" and that "economic questions will not impose themselves over the work of two decades". Another favorable argument, used in the Ministry of Defense's statement to the President, was that technological evolution would favor new surveys. Furthermore, nationalist sectors would be dissatisfied if the government abandoned potential mineral resources in the areas rejected by the CLCS.

LEPLAC had raised economic interest in the continental shelf by revealing some of its mineral potential. In 2005, after the proposal was submitted, oil reserves were found in the Santos Basin's pre-salt layer, further sharpening the interest in the shelf's fossil fuels. The possibilities of development and energy independence offered by the pre-salt layer filled the imagination of political leaders. Nationalist and military sectors now had deeper security concerns and calls for investment into naval defense. The Navy energized its public relations campaign around the concept of a "Blue Amazon", which it had first publicized in 2004 — by no coincidence, in the same year as the extended shelf proposal — as a blanket term for all maritime spaces under national jurisdiction. By analogy with the "Green" Amazon, this term highlights the vastness and natural wealth of the area and its security, environmental and developmental challenges. Much of the Blue Amazon's rhetoric focuses on the continental shelf.

The CIRM's 2008 decision underlined what was at stake: Brazil still had "the task of determining its final legal limit — the Continental Shelf — to conclude the work of the final outline of the Nation's physical base". According to diplomat Christiano Figueirôa, "the definition of the exterior limits of Brazil's continental shelf beyond 200 nautical miles represents the greatest delimitation procedure in the country since the Baron of Rio Branco's era". Luiz Alberto Figueiredo presented the continental shelf as the last remaining undefined legal boundary, as definitive borders have already been decided on land. Since 2010 Brazil proclaims its right to approve in advance any scientific research in its extended shelf, even conceding that no final limit has been established.

=== Revised proposals ===
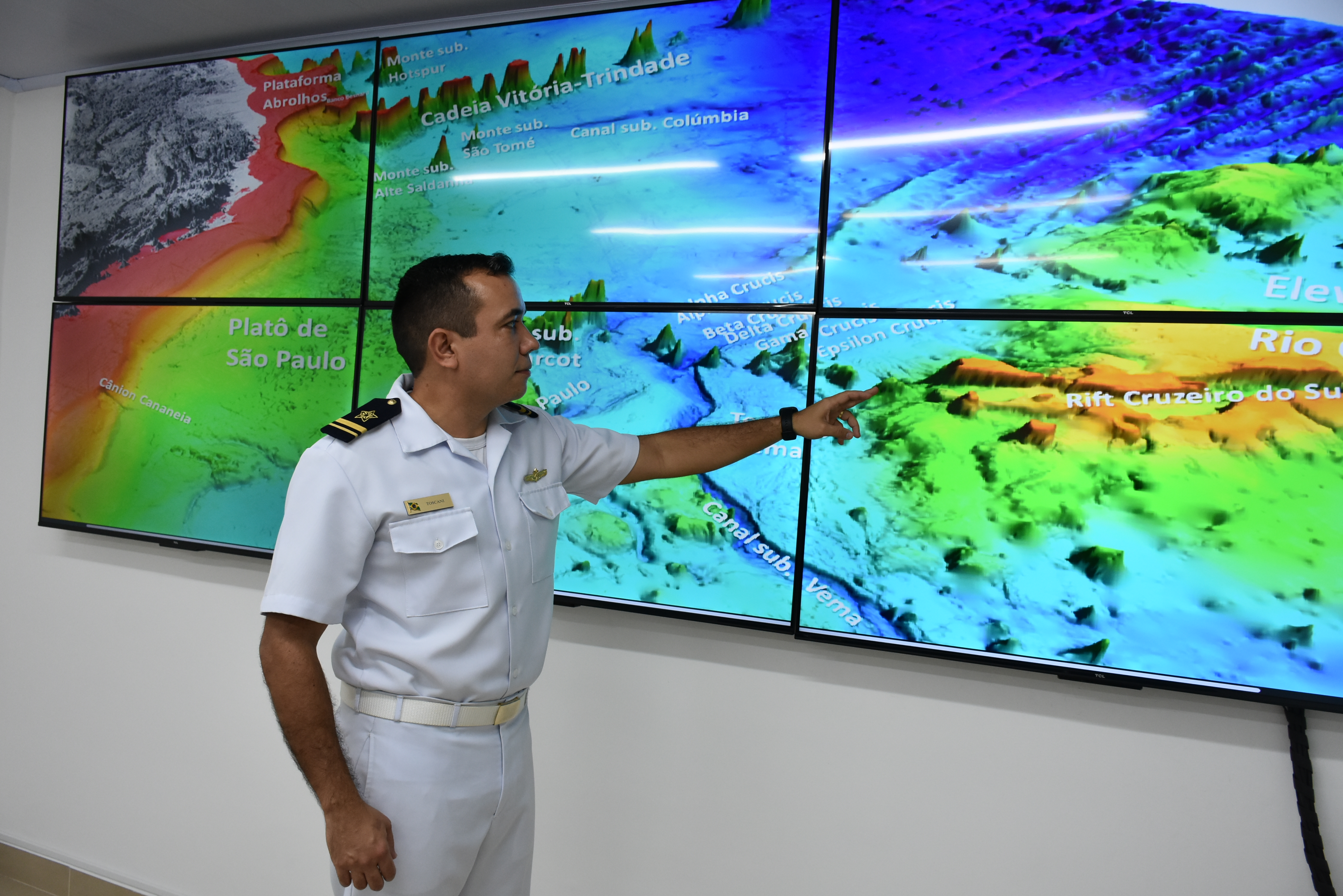
3D bathymetric model of the area between the coast and the Rio Grande Rise

A second stage of LEPLAC, mostly conducted in 2009–2011, filled gaps in the data, particularly in areas where the CLCS disagreed with the original claim. The Antares and the civilian vessels MV Discoverer, MV Sea Surveyor and MV Prof. Logachev collected profiles for multibeam bathymety (92,703 km of profiles), multi-channel seismic data (11,893 km), gravimetry (81,157 km), magnetometry (76,618 km) simplified multi-channel seismic data via Mini Air Gun (61,896 km) and 3,5 kHz data (71,966 km). In addition, the expeditions launched sonobuoys and retrieved rock samples from seamounts in the Vitória-Trindade and North Brazilian chains. Another program, the Prospection and Exploration of Mineral Resources in the International Area of the South and Equatorial Atlantic (Prospecção e Exploração de Recursos Minerais da Área Internacional do Atlântico Sul, Proarea), and follow-on initiatives studied the Rio Grande Rise (RGR), a region previously excluded from the claims. Early studies could not prove with certainty the region was part of the continental crust. Researchers in this area meet strong currents and weather and a steep, rocky seafloor.

Newer surveys underpinned three revised proposals for the southern margin (April 10 2015), concerning the coast between Rio Grande do Sul and Paraná, the equatorial margin (September 8 2017), concerning the Amazon Fan and North Brazilian Chain, and the eastern and southern margins (December 7 2018), concerning the Vitória-Trindade Ridge, the Santa Catarina Plateau and the RGR. The extended continental shelf claim, adding all revised proposals, reaches a total area of 2,094,656.59 km². The proposal's division into three parts submitted over several years allowed each additional part to be adjusted to earlier CLCS demands, at the cost of delaying the process. Some sensitive data was only shown to the CLCS and withheld from the public, which was only shown the executive summaries, so as to not reveal the information to third parties.

Claiming the RGR will territorialize part of the "Area", a maritime zone enshrined as a common heritage of mankind in the UNCLOS. Brazilian authorities believe territorialization to be a worldwide process and therefore, Brazil must expand its own maritime zones. At a CIRM meeting on April 30, 2019, a Ministry of Foreign Affairs representative argued that "if Brazil is not proactive in this area, sooner or later, a power would show up - this would not be a country with capabilities inferior to ours - to prospect for ores, oil and gas in the RGR. It would truly be a very uncomfortable situation". The CLCS accepted claims over the coasts of Rio Grande do Sul and Santa Catarina, spanning around 170 thousand km^{2}, in 2019. As of August 2024 Brazil had yet to reach a final understanding with the CLCS, and the expansion of its continental shelf remained on hold.

== Natural resources ==
=== Petroleum and natural gas ===
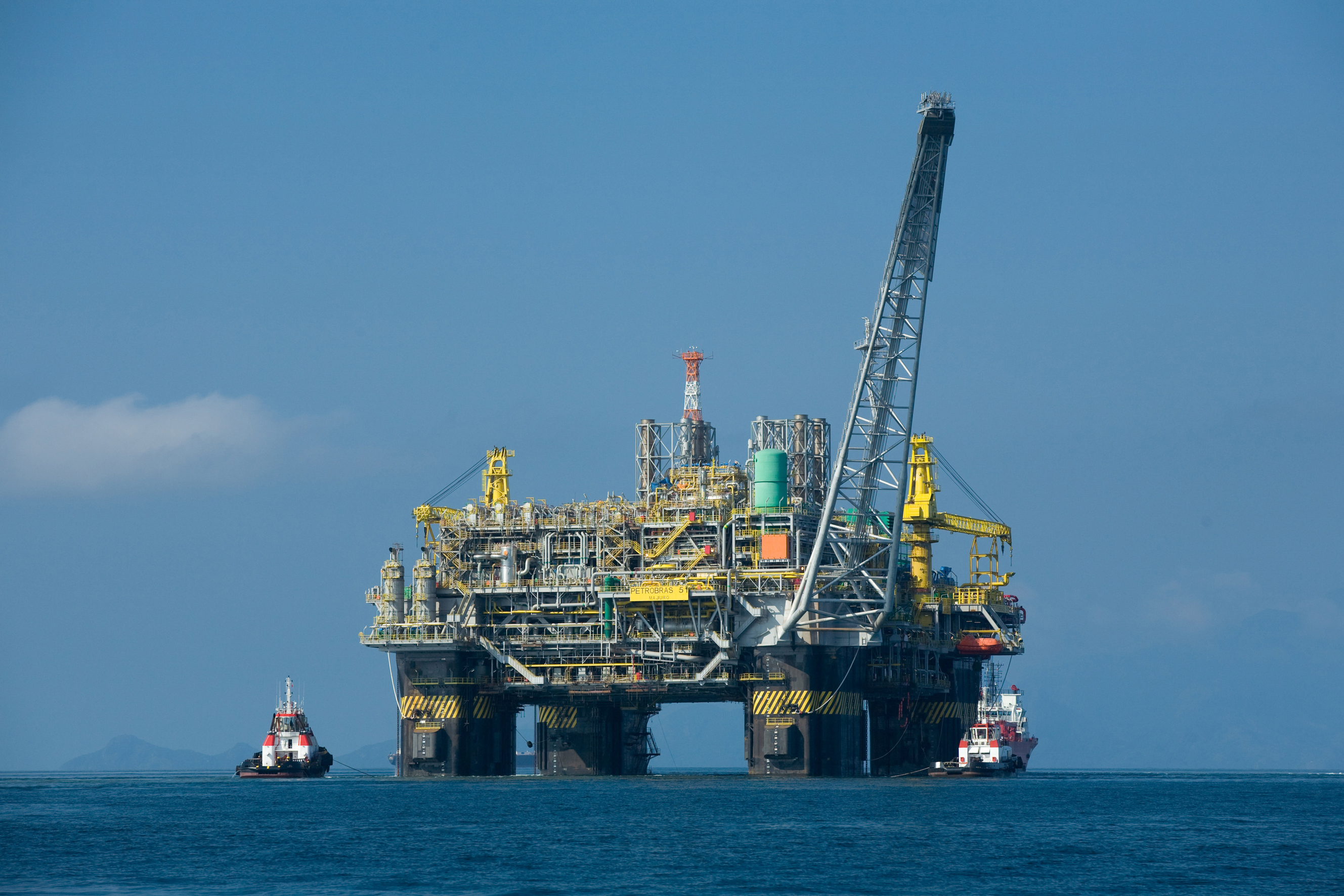
Petrobras oil platform

The sea is the primary site of national oil extraction — 95.1% of 2023's production in barrel of oil equivalent (boe). The sector provided 15% of the national industrial gross domestic product in 2022, 7% of it in extraction and 8% in the derivatives market, and is the most technology-intensive sector of the Brazilian maritime economy. Average daily production in 2023 stood at 3.402 million barrels of crude oil and 150 million cubic meters of natural gas, which was the world's 8th largest production of crude oil and lease condensate. There were 15.894 billion barrels of proven oil reserves and 517 billion cubic meters of proven natural gas reserves in 2023; in 2018, Brazil had the world's 14th largest reserve. The most important basin is Santos, where 74.08% of crude oil and 75.34% of natural gas were extracted in 2023. The Campos Basin is in second place for both products. Fields along the coast of São Paulo, Rio de Janeiro and Espírito Santo had a combined share of 55.2% of national production in 2019.

The first offshore oil well was drilled in 1968, when continental production could no longer satisfy demand. The earliest discoveries were in the marine prolongation of the Sergipe-Alagoas continental basin. The 1973 oil crisis encouraged further investment in this sector and commercially viable drilling began in 1977 and overtook continental drilling five years later. Daily oil production rose from 167 thousand barrels in 1970 to 574 thousand in 1985 and a million in 1997. Technological challenges were overcome to exploit ever deeper waters; ten years after production began, it already reached the continental slope, under water columns of 700 m and higher, and Brazil is now a significant producer at deep (500–1500 m) and ultra deep (> 1500 m) waters.

Petrobras is historically an object of nationalistic pride and a key to ambitions of catching up with the world's major economies, particularly in the euphoric times after the pre-salt reserves were found. They are a product of the South Atlantic's geological evolution, which favored the accumulation of fossil fuels in sedimentary basins along the continental margin. In the early phase of the South American-African split, organic matter-rich sediments were deposited in rift valleys where the heat and intense evaporation precipitated sea salt, under which a pre-salt layer of oil and natural gas was formed. Drilling in this layer began in 2005 and exceeded post-salt production in 2017. The Guardian reported in 2015 that earlier enthusiasm had given way to mixed feelings in a backdrop of low global oil prices, environmental concerns and debt and scandals in Petrobras. Nominal self-sufficiency — crude oil supply exceeds the consumption of derivatives — is not realized for lack of refinery capacity.

As of 2024, Petrobras estimated production would decline by the end of the decade. The Brazilian equatorial margin, from Amapá to Rio Grande do Norte, is a new frontier of exploration, but the company has yet to be authorized by the Brazilian Institute of Environment and Renewable Natural Resources (Ibama) to drill most fields.

=== Other fuels ===
Coal deposits were found near Santa Terezinha Beach, in Rio Grande do Sul, at depths of 700–800 m. Gas hydrates — methane molecules trapped in ice crystals within sediment — were found in the Amazon and Rio Grande fans, but information is incomplete for the rest of the country. They are a potential alternative to oil and natural gas, but their extraction, storage and employment are still technologically difficult.

=== Minerals ===
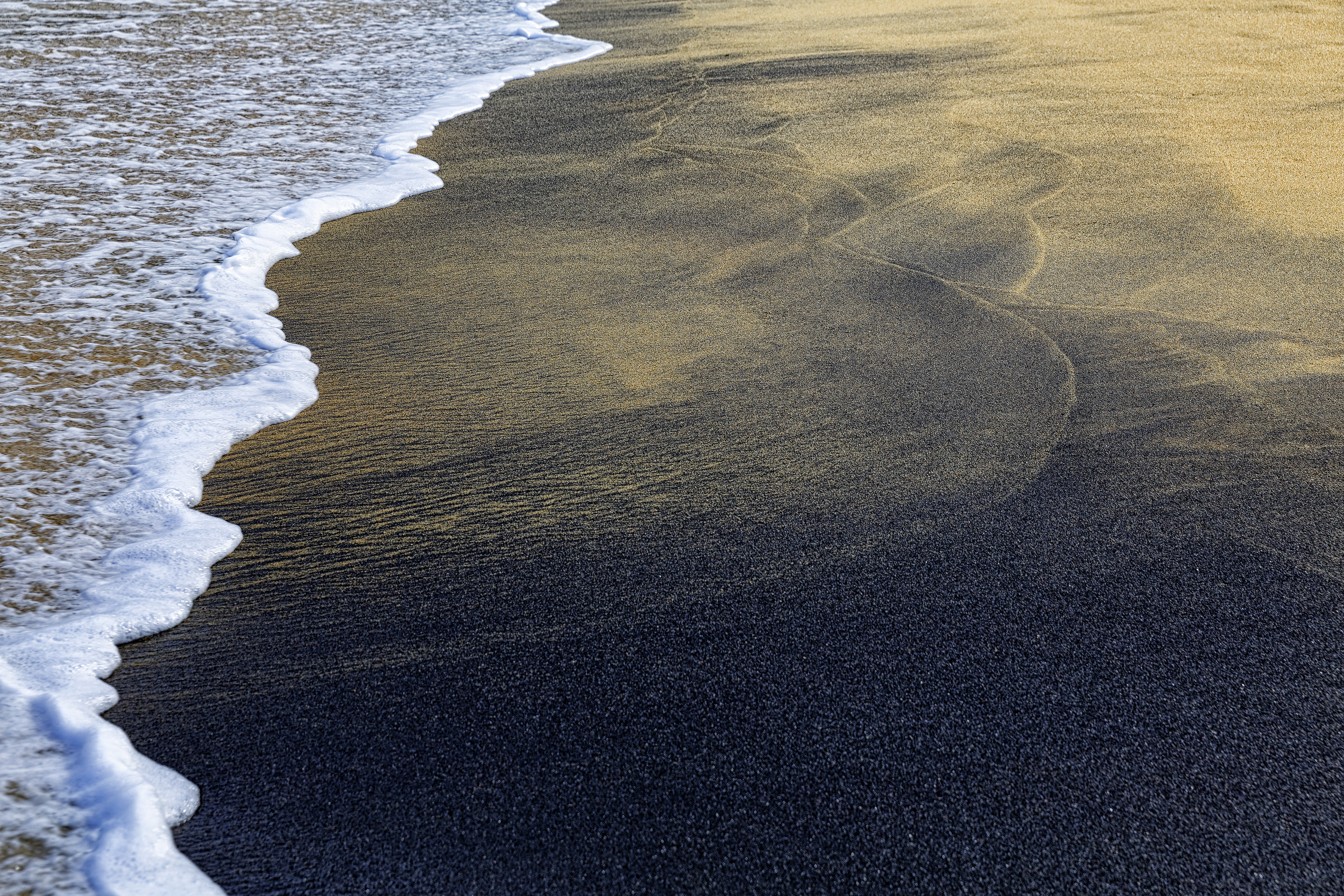
Monazite sand beach in Guarapari, Espírito Santo

The Brazilian continental shelf contains deposits of aggregates, heavy mineral sands, phosphorites, evaporites and sulphur. Greater depths and distances from the shore have been prospected for cobalt-rich ferromanganese crusts, polymetallic sulfides and polymetallic nodules. Most are in the "Area" — the stretch of seabed under international jurisdiction — with the notable exceptions of the areas around Saint Peter and Saint Paul, Trindade and Martim Vaz and the Rio Grande Rise. In most cases, technologies for their exploitation and use are still unavailable.

Undersea mining as a whole is of little relevance in the present and can be considered a future resource. A mere 11 underwater mining titles registered under the National Mining Agency were exploited in 2019, all of them of limestone (in Maranhão, Bahia, Pernambuco and Paraíba) and shelly limestone (in Espírito Santo). The Agency also classes some limestone, clay and sand titles in the coast as part of the "minerals exploited in the continental shelf". This sector is concentrated in the Northeast. Although production volumes are not given for each title, all of them are non-metallic minerals, a category whose share of national mining production was only 20%. On the other hand, many areas were under research.

Aggregates occur in two categories: siliciclastic, composed of sand and gravel, and bioclastic, which are rich in calcium carbonate and composed of sand, gravel, rhodoliths and carbonate concretions. Siliciclastic aggregates are extracted at depths of up to 30 m, with an estimated potential of billions of cubic meters through the coast. They can be used in the cement, glass and steel industries, in construction and in the reconstruction of eroded shores. Bioclastic aggregates occur from the Pará River to Cape Frio and can be used in agriculture, water filters, cosmetics, dietary supplements, bone implants, construction, the steel industry and water treatment.

Phosphorites are correlated with upwelling zones and are therefore uncommon in the Brazilian continental margin. However, they have been found in the Ceará Plateau at a 400 m depth, the Pernambuco Plateau at 700–1,250 m, the Florianópolis Terrace at 200–600 m, the Rio Grande Terrace at 200–800 m and the Rio Grande Rise at 700–1,500 m. They can be used as fertilizer and industrial phosphorus sources, and some deposits have significant concentrations of iron, titanium and rare earth metals.

Heavy mineral placer deposits are found in both emerged and submerged portions of the coast, from Pará to Rio Grande do Sul. Zirconite, titanium-rich rutile and ilmenite, cerium- and thorium-rich monazite have seen industrial-scale extraction in the past or the present. In the submerged portion, extraction at depths of 40 to 100 m is viable but not yet undertaken. The mouth of the Jequitinhonha and Pardo-Salobro rivers in Bahia may contain diamond deposits.

Mineral salt evaporites — anhydrous salts, gypsum, halite, potassium and manganese — overlay the pre-salt layer from the Sergipe-Alagoas Basin to the Santos Basin. As of 2005, the Sergipe-Alagoas Basin was the only potassium chloride production site in the country, with estimated reserves of 13.5 million tons. Deposits from Abrolhos to Mucuri, in Bahia, and Barra Nova, in Espírito Santo, are particularly promising for their minimal depths and distances from the shore. In Abrolhos, sulfide-covered saline domes have been found at depths of 20 to 30 m.

Iron- and manganese-rich polymetallic nodules have been identified in the Pernambuco Plateau at depths of 1,750 to 2,200 m, in the Vema Channel and in the Vitória-Trindade Ridge. Cobalt-rich ferromanganese crusts occur in the Pernambuco Plateau at depths of 1,000 to 3,000 m and in the Rio Grande Rise. Hydrothermal deposits of polymetallic sulfides and associated metalliferous sediment likely exist around the Saint Peter and Saint Paul Archipelago. The Brazilian Geological Service signed a contract in 2015 with the International Seabed Authority to survey the Rio Grande Rise, which was at the time considered an area under international jurisdiction. Once it was claimed as part of the extended continental shelf, the contract was ended in 2021.

== References and notes ==
=== Sources ===
- "Encarte da consolidação da produção 2023" (PDF). Boletim da Produção de Petróleo e Gás Natural (160). Agência Nacional do Petróleo, Gás Natural e Biocombustíveis. December 2023.
- "Boletim de Recursos e Reservas de Petróleo e Gás Natural" (PDF). Boletim de Recursos e Reservas de Petróleo e Gás Natural. Agência Nacional do Petróleo, Gás Natural e Biocombustíveis. March 2024.
- Assumpção, Alexander Neves de (2018). Interpretações sobre as áreas de Jurisdição a partir da Costa: O conceito de Águas Jurisdicionais Brasileiras comparado a conceitos Análogos do Chile e Argentina (PDF) (Monograph). Escola de Guerra Naval.
- Carvalho, Vinícius Mariano de (2022). "Beyond the Blue Amazon: the Brazilian vocation to the South Atlantic". Power and the Maritime Domain. Routledge. ISBN 978-1-003-29898-4.
- Castro, Belmiro M.; et al. (2017). "A Amazônia Azul: recursos e preservação". Revista USP (113): 7–26. doi:10.11606/issn.2316-9036.v0i113p7-26. Archived from the original on 2018-07-19.
- CEMBRA (2022). O Brasil e o mar no século XXI: Relatório aos tomadores de decisão do país (3rd ed.). Niterói: Centro de Excelência para o Mar Brasileiro. ISBN 978-65-991881-2-1.
- Centro de Gestão e Estudos Estratégicos (2008). Mar e ambientes costeiros (PDF). Brasília: Ministério da Ciência, Tecnologia e Inovação. ISBN 978-85-60755-05-9.
- Dominguez, José Maria Landim; Silva, Rian Pereira da; Nunes, Alina Sá; Freire, Antonio Fernandes Menezes (December 2013). "The narrow, shallow, low-accommodation shelf of central Brazil: sedimentology, evolution, and human uses". Geomorphology. 203: 46–59. Bibcode:2013Geomo.203...46D. doi:10.1016/j.geomorph.2013.07.004.
- Duarte, Érico (2016). "Brazil, the Blue Economy and the maritime security of the South Atlantic". Journal of the Indian Ocean Region. 12 (1): 97–111. doi:10.1080/19480881.2015.1067384.
- Figueirôa, Christiano Sávio Barros (2014). Limites exteriores da plataforma continental do Brasil conforme o direito do mar (PDF). Brasília: FUNAG. ISBN 978-85-7631-523-0. Archived from the original (PDF) on 2015-06-01.
- Lopes, Roberto (2014). As garras do cisne: o ambicioso plano da Marinha brasileira de se transformar na nona frota mais poderosa do mundo. Rio de Janeiro: Record. ISBN 978-85-01-10276-8.
- Maia, Felipe Malachini (2020). O Brasil no Mar: um panorama sobre as potenciais ameaças ao seu entorno estratégico e à Amazônia Azul (PDF) (Dissertation). Escola de Guerra Naval.
- Marreiro, Matheus Moraes Alves (2021). As representações espaciais e a geopolítica popular no Brasil: o Atlântico Sul como uma geografia imaginativa (PDF) (Dissertation). Programa de Pós-Graduação em Segurança Internacional e Defesa da Escola Superior de Guerra.
- Mendes, Andrea Ribeiro (2006). A Constituição das fronteiras marítimas brasileiras: do "Mar Territorial" à "Amazônia Azul" (PDF) (Dissertation). Escola Nacional de Ciências Estatísticas.
- Miloslavich, Patricia; et al. (2011). "Marine biodiversity in the Atlantic and Pacific coasts of South America: knowledge and gaps". PLOS ONE. 6 (1) e14631. Bibcode:2011PLoSO...614631M. doi:10.1371/journal.pone.0014631. hdl:11336/99871. PMC 3031619. PMID 21304960.
- Mohriak, Webster Ueipass; Torres, Luiz Carlos (2017). "Levantamentos geofísicos para a delimitação da margem continental brasileira". Revista USP (113): 59–80. doi:10.11606/issn.2316-9036.v0i113p59-80. Archived from the original on 2018-07-23.
- Pontes, Beatriz Maria Soares (July–December 2012). "O valor estratégico do Promontório Nordestino". Revista de Geopolítica. 3 (2). Natal: UFRN.
- Sager, W. W. (2014). "Scientific Drilling in the South Atlantic: Rio Grande Rise, Walvis Ridge and surrounding areas" (PDF). U.S. Science Support Program Workshop Report. Archived from the original (PDF) on 2015-05-18.
- Serafim, Carlos Frederico Simões (coord.) (2005). O mar no espaço geográfico brasileiro (PDF). Brasília: Ministério da Educação. ISBN 85-98171-20-4.
- Silva, Alexandre Pereira da (2013). "O novo pleito brasileiro no mar: a plataforma continental estendida e o Projeto Amazônia Azul". Revista Brasileira de Política Internacional. 56 (1). Universidade de Brasília: 104–121. doi:10.1590/S0034-73292013000100006.
- Silva, Alexandre Pereira da (2017). "Brazil's recent agenda on the sea and the South Atlantic contemporary scenario". Marine Policy. 85 (85): 25–32. Bibcode:2017MarPo..85...25D. doi:10.1016/j.marpol.2017.08.010.
- Silva, Alexandre Pereira da (2020). "The concept of Brazilian Jurisdictional Waters and its impact on the freedom of the high seas". The International Journal of Marine and Coastal Law. 35 (2): 295–324. doi:10.1163/15718085-12341003.
- Silva, Alexandre Pereira da (2021). "Brazil advances over the Area: The inclusion of the Rio Grande Rise within the Brazilian outer continental shelf and its consequences for other states and for the common heritage of mankind". Marine Policy. 125. Bibcode:2021MarPo.12504399P. doi:10.1016/j.marpol.2021.104399.
- Sousa, Isabela Moreno Cordeiro de (2019). Crostas ferromanganesíferas e sedimentos carbonáticos da Elevação do Rio Grande: interpretações paleoceanográficas e geológicas (PDF) (Thesis). Programa de Pós-Graduação em Geologia da Universidade de Brasília.
- Sumida, Paulo Yukio Gomes; Bernardino, Angelo Fraga; De Léo, Fabio Cabrera (2020). Brazilian deep-sea biodiversity. Springer. ISBN 978-3-030-53222-2.
- Ventura, Victor Alencar Mayer Feitosa (2020). Environmental Jurisdiction in the Law of the Sea: the Brazilian Blue Amazon. Springer. ISBN 978-3-030-50543-1.
- Violante, Alexandre Rocha (2022). "Amazônia Azul". In Silva, Francisco Carlos Teixeira da (org.) (ed.). Dicionário de história militar do Brasil (1822-2022): volume I. Rio de Janeiro: Autografia. ISBN 978-85-518-4909-5.
- Zanella, Tiago V. (2018). "Águas Jurisdicionais Brasileiras: um estudo sobre a (i)legalidade do conceito de AJB)" (PDF). Revista Jurídica Luso-Brasileira (6). Lisboa: Centro de Investigação de Direito Privado.
