= Balleny Basin =

Undersea basin named in association with the Balleny Islands

- Approximate location

Balleny Basin (67°S 170°E) is a minor undersea basin, almost an appendage to the Southeast Pacific Basin. It was named in association with the Balleny Islands and the name approved by the Advisory Committee on Undersea Features February 1972.
