= Blake Plateau =

Plateau in the Atlantic Ocean

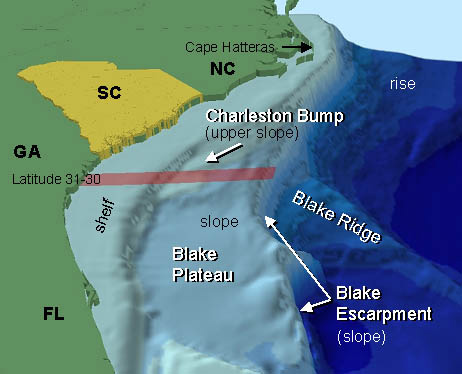
Blake Plateau (National Oceanic and Atmospheric Administration illustration)

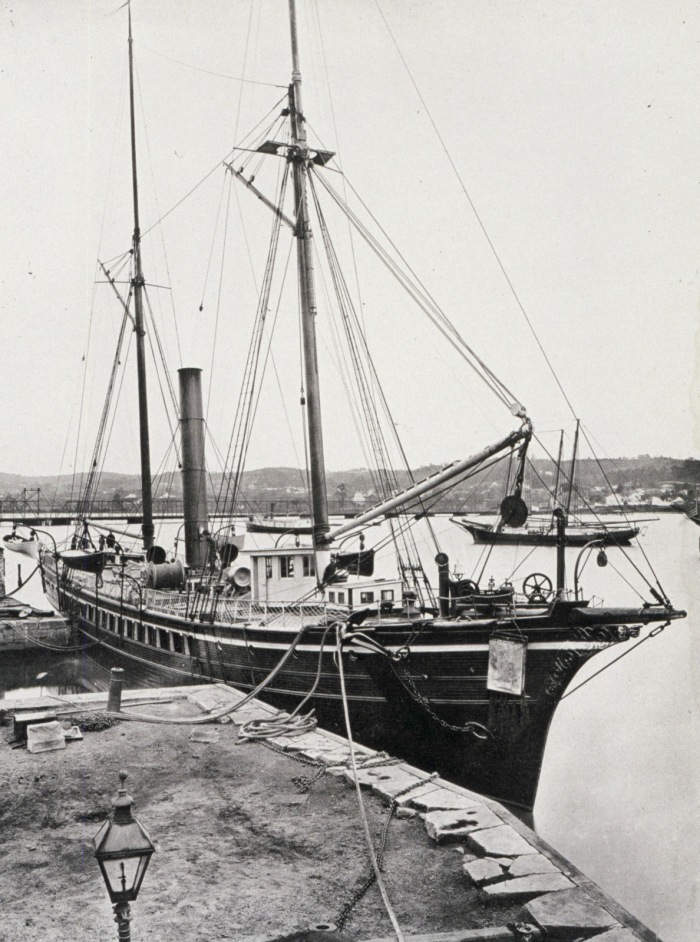
United States Coast and Geodetic Survey steamer USC&GS George S. Blake c. 1880.

The Blake Plateau lies in the western Atlantic Ocean off the coasts of North Carolina, South Carolina, Georgia, and Florida in the southeastern United States. The Blake Plateau lies between the North American continental shelf and the deep ocean basin extending about 145 kilometers (90 miles; 78 nautical miles) east and west by 170 kilometers (110 miles; 92 nautical miles) north and south, with a depth of about 500 meters (1,640 feet) inshore sloping to about 1,000 meters (3,280 feet) about 375 kilometers (233 miles; 202 nautical miles) off shore, where the Blake Escarpment drops steeply to the deep basin. The Blake Plateau and the associated Blake Ridge and Blake Basin are named for the United States Coast and Geodetic Survey steamer USC&GS George S. Blake, in service from 1874 to 1905, which was the first ship to use steel cable for oceanographic operations and pioneered deep ocean and Gulf Stream exploration. George S. Blake′s hydrographic survey lines first defined the plateau that now bears the ship's name.

Blake Plateau has the world's largest known deep-water coral reef, comprising a 6.4 million acre reef that stretches from Miami to Charleston, S. C.

== History ==
In July 1880 George S. Blake under the command of Commander John R. Bartlett, (Note: The Navy oceanographic ship USNS Bartlett (T-AGOR-13) was named in his honor.) U.S.N., was working with sounding gear designed by Lieutenant Commander Charles Dwight Sigsbee in cooperation with Alexander Agassiz, who collected biological samples and examined the Gulf Stream running eastward from Cape Romain when, in taking frequent soundings eastward, "depths on this line were unexpectedly small, the axis of the Gulf Stream being crossed before a depth of three hundred fathoms (1,800 feet (548.6 meters)) was found" with a bottom of "hard coral" and little life. This was an early indication of the plateau that would in the future carry the ship's name. In 1882 Commander Bartlett described the plateau:

Instead of a deep channel in the course of the Stream as reported by Lieutenants Maffit and Craven, and published in the Coast Survey Reports, our later soundings show an extensive and nearly level plateau, extending from a point to the eastward of the Little Bahama Banks to Cape Hatteras—off Cape Canaveral nearly 200 [nautical] miles [230 miles; 370 km] wide, and gradually contracting in width to the northward until reaching Hatteras, where the depth is more than 1000 fathoms [6,000 feet; 1,829 meters] within thirty [nautical] miles [34.5 miles; 55.5 km] of shore. This plateau has a general depth of 400 fathoms [2,400 feet; 732 meters], suddenly dropping off on its eastern edge to over 2000 fathoms [12,000 feet; 3,658 meters].

Bartlett reported the scouring effect of the current on the plateau, noting that on each side of the current the sounding cylinder, a device for sampling the nature of the bottom with the sounding, brought up ooze. Within the current the "bottom was washed nearly bare", with particles being small and broken pieces of coral rock and so hard the sharp edge of the brass cylinder was bent.

== Characteristics ==
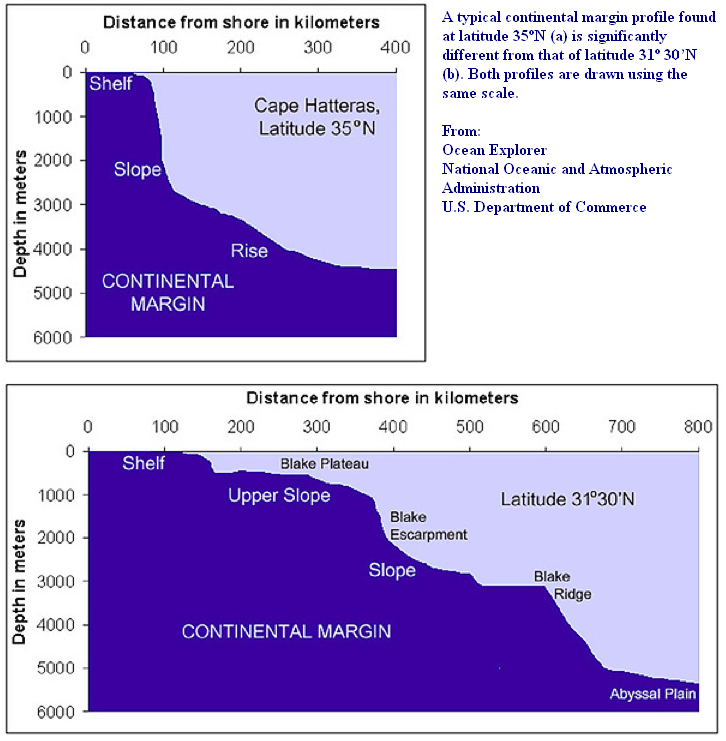
A typical continental margin profile found at latitude 35°N (a) is significantly different from that of latitude 31° 30′N (b). Both profiles are drawn using the same scale. (National Oceanic and Atmospheric Administration, Ocean Explorer)

=== Geology ===
Due to unusual features of the plateau, particularly scouring by the Florida Current and the Antilles Current that merge over the plateau to form the Gulf Stream, mineral deposits, particularly manganese nodules, have long been of interest. Methane and other gas hydrates are also found on the plateau.

=== Biology ===
The Blake Plateau, once believed to be a "bleak, current-swept plain," was known to have some biological communities including Lophelia pertusa reefs that support communities as well as communities supported by gas hydrates. In fact, by 2024 it was discovered that Blake Plateau has the world's largest known deep-water coral reef, comprising a 6.4 million acre reef that stretches from Miami to Charleston, S. C. The area is composed of nearly continuous coral mound features that span up to 500 kilometers (310 miles) long and 110 kilometers (68 miles) wide. One spot, nicknamed "Million Mounds", is the largest part of the reef. It is composed of a stony coral and is commonly found at depths of 656 to 3,280 feet. The reef was discovered during sonar investigations beginning in 2019, and was announced in January 2024.

Commercial fishermen have begun exploiting deep sea fish on the plateau with studies being undertaken on the viability of such fishing, as these fish, although large, grow slowly. Biological sampling of the deep bottom is difficult under the Gulf Stream with the consequence that the fauna is relatively poorly known.

== See also ==
- National Geospatial Intelligence Agency: Undersea Features History
