= Ulleung =

- Ulleung County – a South Korean county
- Ulleungdo – a South Korean island
- Ulleung Basin – an oceanic basin located near Ulleungdo
