= Southeast Pacific Basin =

Undersea basin in the Southern Ocean

- Approximate location

The Southeast Pacific Basin (60°0′S 115°0′W) is an undersea basin near Antarctica. It is located approximately between 230°E and 280°E (80°W–130°W), and 65°S and 35°S. The basin includes the Bellingshausen Plain and Bellingshausen Sea, and it is adjacent to the smaller Balleny Basin.

The basin has been the subject of scientific research. The Deep Sea Drilling Project (1968–1983) studied the Southeast Pacific Basin to learn about plate tectonics and related topics, including by extracting and analyzing core samples from the seabed. Scientists have also studied the barotropic dynamics in the area, including an unusual high-pressure event in 2009 that may have been related to the 2009–2010 El Niño event.

== See also ==
- List of submarine topographical features
