= Alaska Plain =

Oceanic basin under the Gulf of Alaska

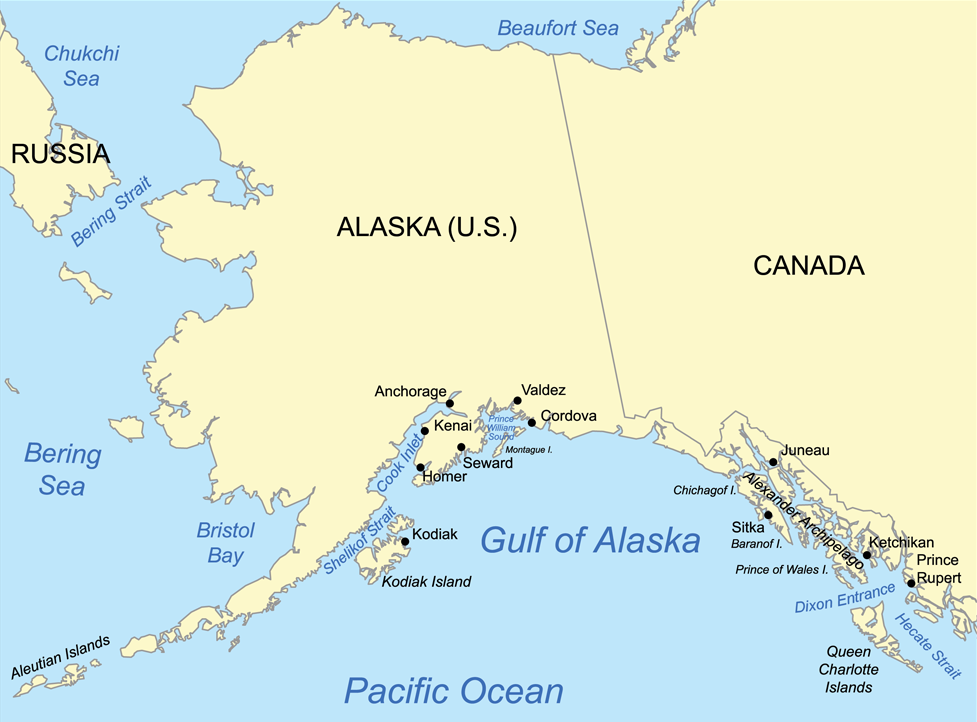
Map showing the Gulf of Alaska

The Alaska Plain, also referred to as the Alaskan Plain or Alaskan Abyssal Plain, is an oceanic basin under the Gulf of Alaska. The plain is bordered to the northwest by the Alaskan portion of the Aleutian Trench, to the north and east by the continental shelf off the coast of Alaska and British Columbia, and to the south by two separate lines of seamounts, from Patton seamount in the northwest, located just south of Kodiak Island, to Bowie seamount in the southeast, located just west of Queen Charlotte Islands, running from 54°40′N 150°30′W and 53°18′N 135°38′W.

== See also ==
- List of submarine topographical features
