= Greenland Plain =

Ocean depression east of Greenland

Greenland Abyssal Plain
- bathymetric depression
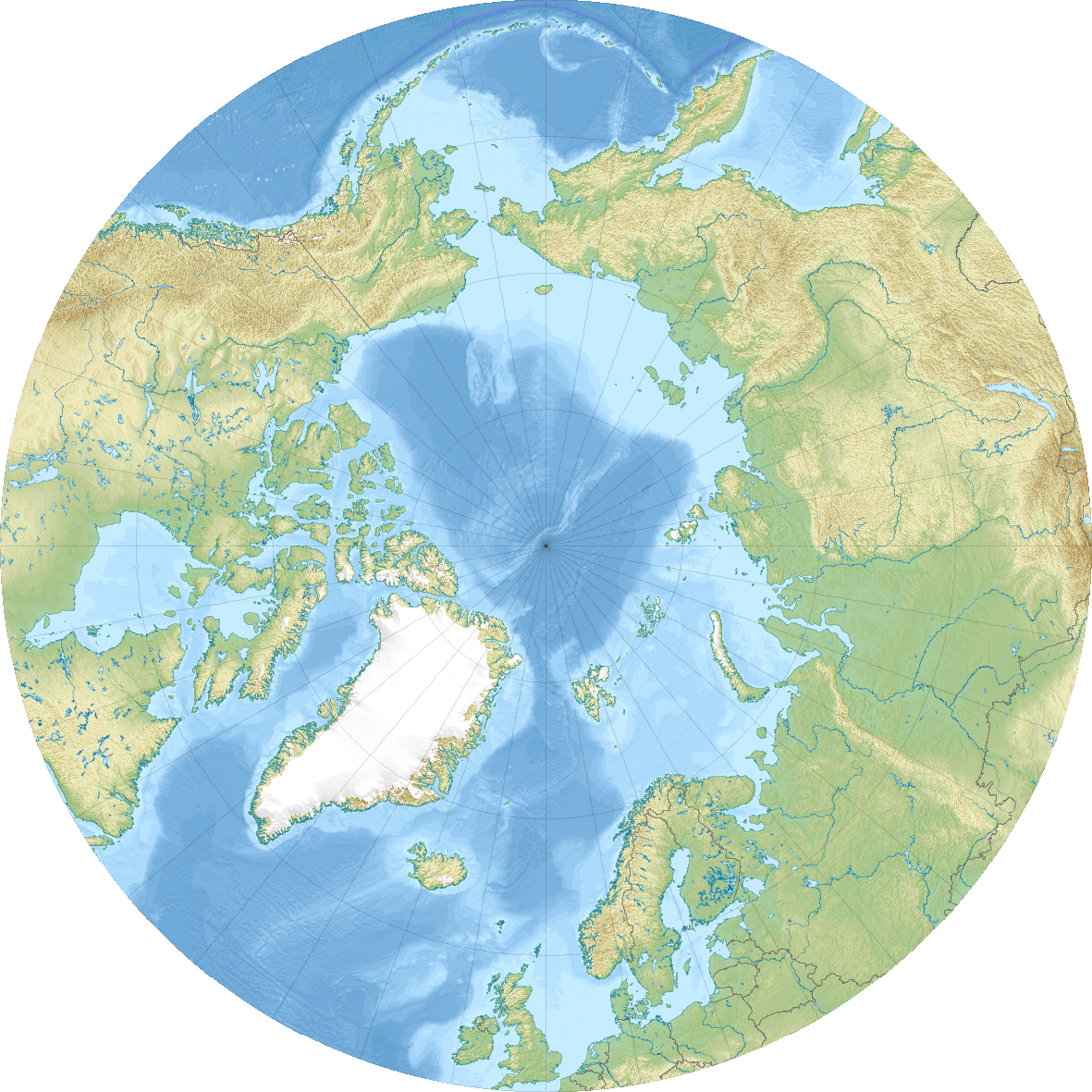
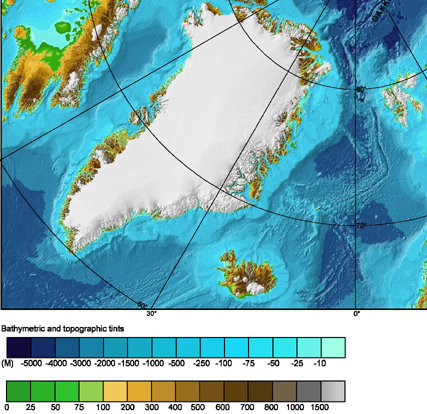
- Location in the Arctic The Greenland Abyssal Plain lies in the Greenland Sea, in the North of Jan Mayen
- Coordinates: 73°N 3°W
- Location: Greenland Sea

The Greenland Abyssal Plain at 75°N 3°W is a bathymetric depression in the Greenland Sea. It is delimited by Mohns Ridge and Jan Mayen pressure zone in the South and separated by a smaller ridge to the Boreas Abyssal Plain in the North.

== Oceanography ==
In 1988/89 ocean acoustic tomography was performed there to study the Greenland Sea gyre and deep water formation. Deep water formation simply means surface water being transported downwards into the ocean, this is important to drive the global ocean currents by thermohaline circulation. The study showed that the mixed layer at the surface forms in autumn. During winter, the region is covered by sea ice. In early spring when the sea ice vanishes, the layer gets thicker (up to 1.5 km). When the Polar day starts in late March the seasonal cycle starts again with another shallow mixed layer.
