= Lichte Trough =

The Lichte Trough (76°25′S 30°0′W) is an undersea trough off-shore of Antarctica, named for Heinrich Lichte (1910–1988), a geodesist who specialized in glaciology. The name was proposed by Heinrich Hinze of the Alfred Wegener Institute for Polar and Marine Research, Bremerhaven, Germany, and was approved by the Advisory Committee for Undersea Features in June 1997.

== See also ==
- List of submarine topographical features
