= North Korea Cold Current =

Cold water current in the Sea of Japan

The North Korea Cold Current (NKCC) is a cold water oceanic current in the Sea of Japan (East Sea of Korea) that flows southward from near Vladivostok along the coastline of the eastern Korean Peninsula. It is a branch of the Liman Current from the Sea of Okhotsk and has a flow rate of about a half knot. The NKCC meets the northward flowing East Korean Warm Current at latitude 37–38° N, causing the flow to separate from the peninsula. At about latitude 40° N, the NKCC meets the Tsushima Warm Current.

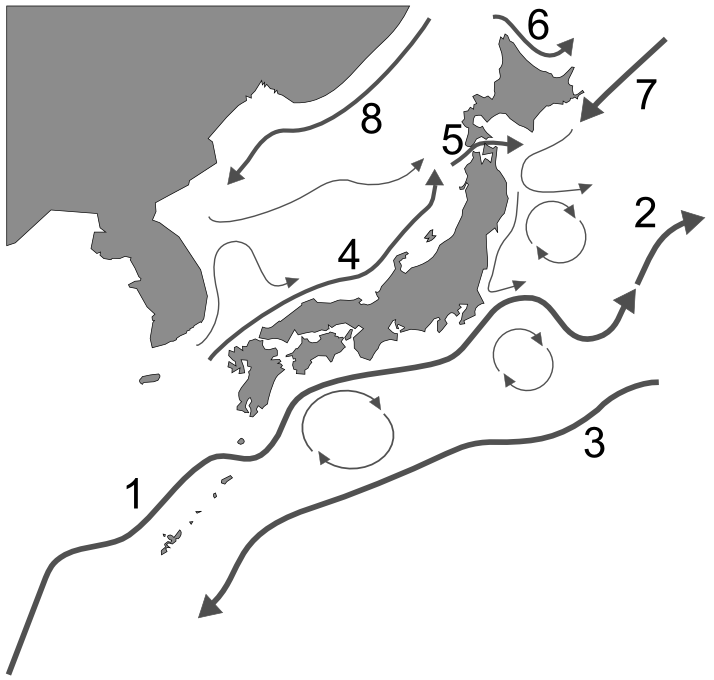
The East Korea Warm Current separates from the Tsushima current (4) in a ∩ shape, while the North Korea Cold Current moves eastward to the north of it.as a branch of Liman Current(8).
