= Tsushima Basin =

Oceanic Basin in the Sea of Japan

Coordinates: 36°34′48.89″N 131°38′57.01″E

Tsushima Basin Ulleung Basin
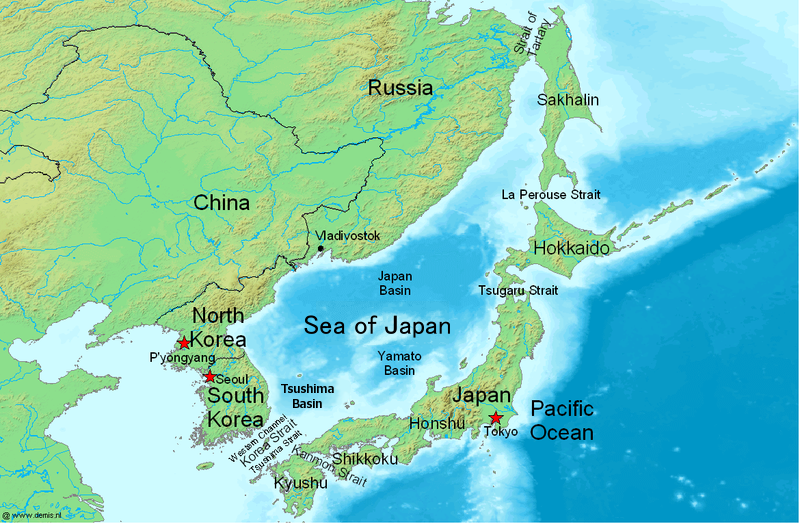
- Tsushima Basin where the Sea of Japan meets the Korea Strait

Japanese name
- Kanji: 対馬海盆
- Hiragana: つしまかいぼん
Transcriptions
- Revised Hepburn: tsushima kaibon

Korean name
- Hangul: 울릉분지
- Hanja: 鬱陵盆地
Transcriptions
- Revised Romanization: ulleung bunji
- McCune–Reischauer: ulleung punji

The Tsushima Basin (Japanese: 対馬海盆, romanized: Tsushima kaibon) or Ulleung Basin (Korean: 울릉분지; RR: Ulleung bunji) is an oceanic basin located where the Sea of Japan meets the Korea Strait. It lies immediately south of Ulleung-do and Liancourt Rocks, in the eastern end of the South Korean EEZ and the western end of the Japanese EEZ.

In 1978, the Japanese government registered the name "Tsushima Basin" with the International Hydrographic Bureau. In April 2006, Japan's plans to survey the region and South Korea's plans to register the name "Ulleung Basin" with the International Hydrographic Bureau resulted in a diplomatic standoff between the two countries. The two countries later agreed to address the issue "at an appropriate time."

The first exploratory drilling for gas was in 1972, but gas discoveries have drawn regional interest since the late 1980s. The first commercial gas discovery was reported in 1998. Nine of 15 exploratory wells have contained gas, a rate indicating high potential prospects.

The East Korea Warm Current, Ulleung Warm Eddy, and Offshore Branch interact within this basin.

A feature of the southwestern Sea of Japan is a deep, developing continental shelf. The eastern Oki Islands, a big ridge of three rows lines up in parallel to the Japanese archipelago, and it connects with a Yamato Basin which has expanded from Oki Islands and offshore of the Tōhoku region to the south in between those. The vast Tsushima Basin has extended on the tip of the Oki offshore that expands from Oki Islands on the north side.
