= Argentine Basin =

Coordinates: 40.0000°S 43.0000°W

The Argentine Basin is a region of the Atlantic Ocean floor off the east coast of Argentina, between the Mid-Atlantic Ridge to the east and the Scotia Basin to the west. To the north is the Brazil Basin, with the two basins being separated by the Rio Grande Rise. The southern edge of the Argentine Basin is formed by the Falklands/Malvinas Escarpment. The Argentine Basin has an average depth of 5,000 m (16,000 ft) and is characterized by low temperatures. The deepest point is the Argentine Abyssal Plain at the base of the Falkland Escarpment, which reaches a depth of 6,212 m (20,381 ft).

The Antarctic Bottom Water current, which dominates the circulation in the abyssal layer of the southwest Atlantic, enters the southwest part of the Argentine Basin, then is deflected northward along the continental rise. It passes into the Brazil Basin through the Vema Channel (39° 30′ W) to the west of the Rio Grande Rise. Here, the current reaches velocities of 20–25 cm/s.
