= Baffin Basin =

Oceanic basin located in the middle of Baffin Bay between Baffin Island and Greenland

Coordinates: 73°15′N 67°0′W

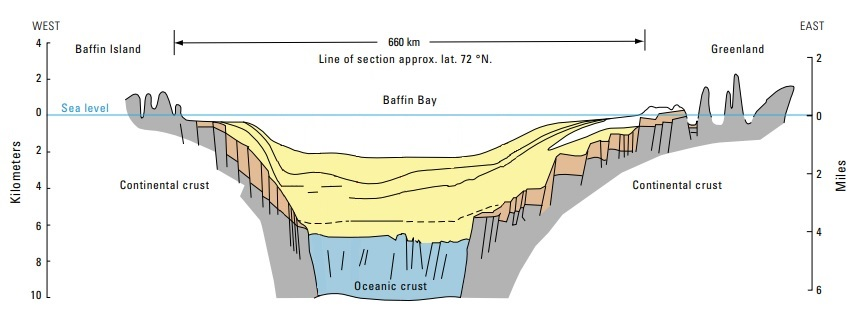
Baffin Basin

The Baffin Basin is an oceanic basin located in the middle of Baffin Bay between Baffin Island and Greenland. With a maximum depth of over 2,700 m (8,900 ft), the basin represents the deepest point of Baffin Bay. The basin formed as a result of seafloor spreading at the time of the opening of Baffin Bay around 56 million years ago.
