= Atlantic-Indian Basin =

Large undersea basin

Coordinates: 60°S 15°E

The Atlantic-Indian Basin (alternately the Valdivia Basin) is a large undersea basin. The name was approved by the Advisory Committee for Undersea Features (ACUF) in July 1963 after a review of a National Geographic Society globe.
