= Dibble Basin =

Dibble Basin (65°20′S 133°0′E) is an undersea basin in the Antarctic Ocean. The name was approved by the Advisory Committee on Undersea Features in December 1971.
