= Amundsen Plain =

Abyssal plain in the Southern Ocean

Amundsen Plain (65°0′S 125°0′W) is an undersea abyssal plain named in association with Amundsen Coast. The name was approved by the Advisory Committee on Undersea Features in June 1988.
