= Blake Basin =

Coordinates: 28°37′57.89″N 76°35′48.05″W

The Blake Basin, also called the Blake–Bahama Basin, is a deep area of the Atlantic Ocean which runs along the east coast of the United States. It starts at the northern part of the Bahamas and continues up toward New York. The depth exceeds 5400 meters between the Blake Plateau and Blake Escarpment to the South and West, and the Blake Bahama Outer Ridge.
