= Weddell Plain =

Undersea plain associated with the Weddell Sea off Antarctica

Weddell Plain (65°0′S 20°0′W) is an undersea abyssal plain named in association with the Weddell Sea off Antarctica. Name approved 6/87 (ACUF 225).
