= East Korea Warm Current =

Ocean current in the Sea of Japan

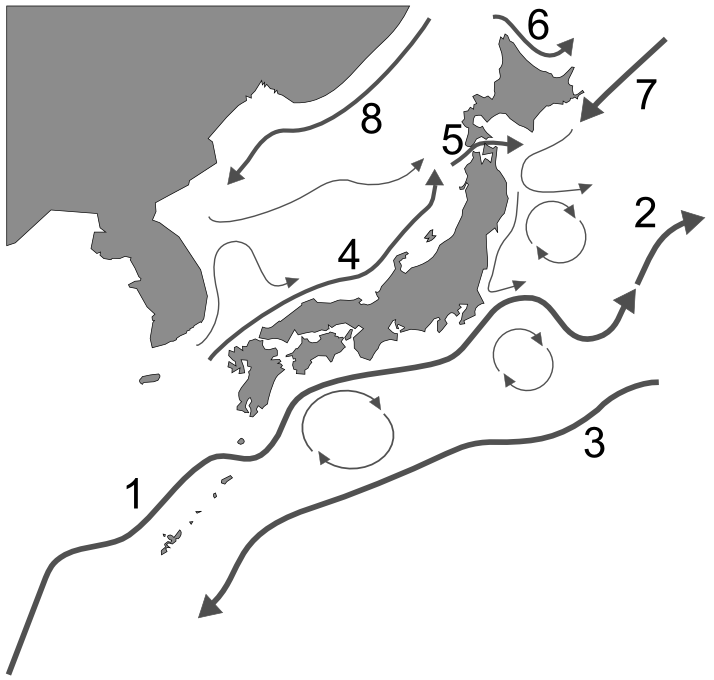
The East Korea Warm Current separates from the Tsushima current (4) in a ∩ shape, while the North Korea Cold Current moves eastward to the north of it, as a branch of the Liman Current (8).

The East Korea Warm Current (EKWC; Korean: 동한난류; Hanja: 東韓暖流; 동한해류; 東韓海流; 東韓鮮流) is an ocean current in the Sea of Japan (East Sea). It branches off from the Tsushima Current at the eastern end of the Korea Strait, and flows north along the southeastern coast of the Korean Peninsula. Between 36° and 38° N, it encounters the North Korea Cold Current and veers southeast into the open sea. The boundary between the two currents fluctuates throughout the year, creating large eddies. The interactions of these currents also have seasonal effects on the mixing and stratification in the southwest region of the Sea of Japan. As it flows northeastward, the East Korea current eventually rejoins the Tsushima Current. It is very hot and rainy in the summer.

== See also ==
- Geography of South Korea
