= Boreas Plain =

The Boreas Plain is an abyssal plain in the South of Fram Strait with water depths of around 3 km at 78°N 0°E.
