= Abyssal hill =

Small hill that rises from the floor of an abyssal plain

An abyssal hill is a small hill that rises from the floor of an abyssal plain. They are the most abundant geomorphic structures on Earth, covering more than 30% of the ocean floor. Abyssal hills have relatively sharply defined edges and climb to heights of no more than a few hundred meters. They can be from a few hundred meters to kilometers in width. A region of the abyssal plain that is covered in such hill structures is termed an "abyssal-hills province". However, abyssal hills can also appear in small groups or in isolation.

The greatest abundance of abyssal hills occurs on the floor of the Pacific Ocean. These Pacific Ocean hills are typically 50–300 m (160–980 ft) in height, with a width of 2–5 km (1.2–3.1 mi) and a length of 10–20 km (6.2–12.4 mi). They may be created along the flanks of the tectonically active East Pacific Rise as horst-and-graben features, then become stretched out with the passage of time. Abyssal hills may also be areas of thicker oceanic crust that were generated at the mid-ocean ridge during times of increased magma production.
