= Argentine Abyssal Plain =

Abyssal plain near Argentina

Coordinates: 47.5°S 51°W

The Argentine Abyssal Plain forms part of the Argentine Basin off the east coast of Argentina. It comprises the deepest sections of the basin on the western and south-western margins, reaching a depth of 6,212m (20,381 feet).
