= Oceanic basin =

Geologic basin under the sea

In hydrology, an oceanic basin (or ocean basin) is anywhere on Earth that is covered by seawater. Geologically, most of the ocean basins are large geologic basins that are below sea level.

Most commonly the ocean is divided into basins following the continents distribution: the North and South Atlantic (together approximately 75 million km^{2}/ 29 million mi^{2}), North and South Pacific (together approximately 155 million km^{2}/ 59 million mi^{2}), Indian Ocean (68 million km^{2}/ 26 million mi^{2}) and Arctic Ocean (14 million km^{2}/ 5.4 million mi^{2}). Also recognized is the Southern Ocean (20 million km^{2}/ 7 million mi^{2}). All ocean basins collectively cover 67% of the Earth's surface, and together they contain almost 97% of all water on the planet. They have an average depth of almost 4 km (about 2.5 miles).

== Definitions of boundaries ==
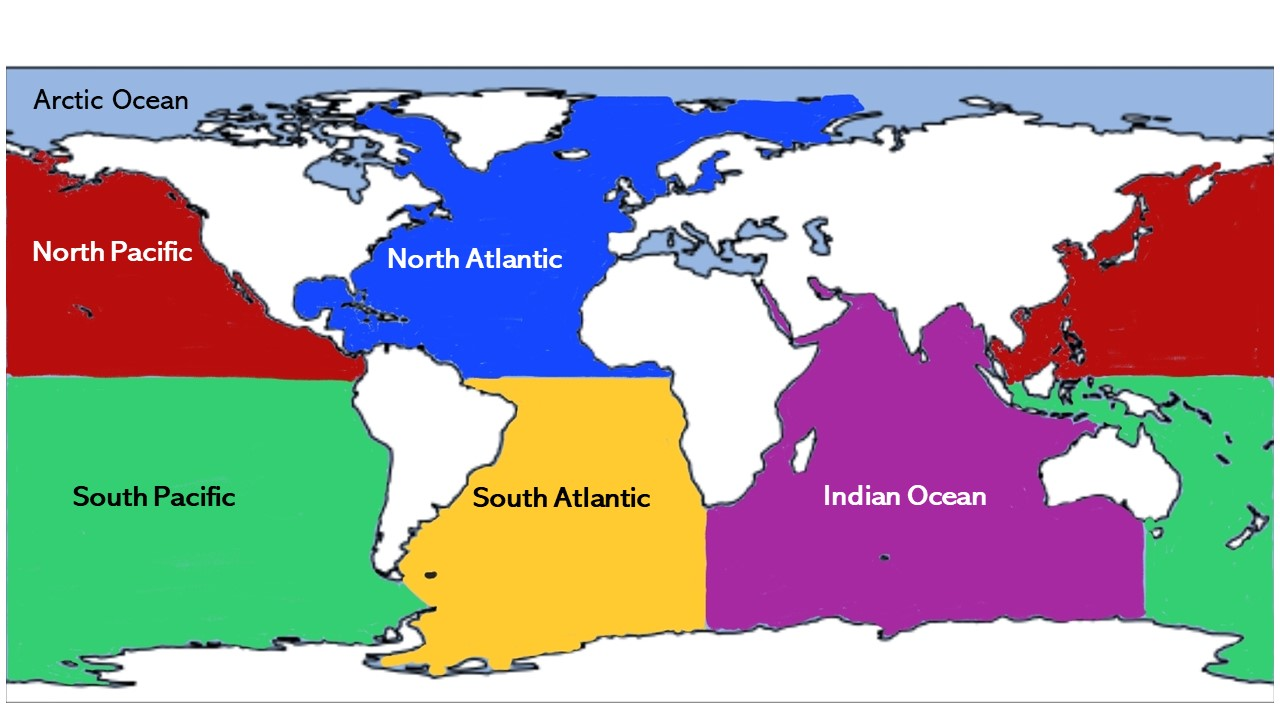
This figure shows the main ocean basins as they are defined in "Limits of Oceans and Seas". The boundaries are based on geography of continents and the equator.

=== Boundaries based on continents ===
"Limits of Oceans and Seas", published by the International Hydrographic Office in 1953, is a document that defined the ocean's basins as they are largely known today. The main ocean basins are the ones named in the previous section. These main basins are divided into smaller parts. Some examples are: the Baltic Sea (with three subdivisions), the North Sea, the Greenland Sea, the Norwegian Sea, the Laptev Sea, the Gulf of Mexico, the South China Sea, and many more. The limits were set for convenience of compiling sailing directions but had no geographical or physical ground and to this day have no political significance. For instance, the line between the North and South Atlantic is set at the equator. The Antarctic or Southern Ocean, which reaches from 60° south to Antarctica had been omitted until 2000, but is now also recognized by the International Hydrographic Office. Nevertheless, and since ocean basins are interconnected, many oceanographers prefer to refer to one single ocean basin instead of multiple ones.

Older references (e.g., Littlehales 1930) consider the oceanic basins to be the complement to the continents, with erosion dominating the latter, and the sediments so derived ending up in the ocean basins. This vision is supported by the fact that oceans lie lower than continents, so the former serve as sedimentary basins that collect sediment eroded from the continents, known as clastic sediments, as well as precipitation sediments. Ocean basins also serve as repositories for the skeletons of carbonate- and silica-secreting organisms such as coral reefs, diatoms, radiolarians, and foraminifera. More modern sources (e.g., Floyd 1991) regard the ocean basins more as basaltic plains, than as sedimentary depositories, since most sedimentation occurs on the continental shelves and not in the geologically defined ocean basins.

=== Definition based on surface connectivity ===
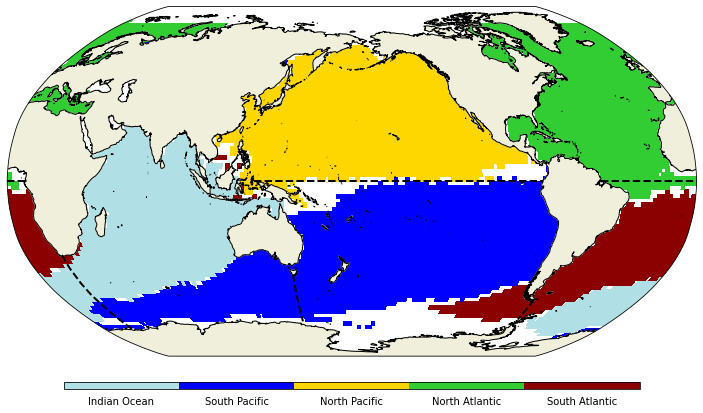
These are the ocean basins defined by Froyland et al. (2014), based on surface connectivity. The black dashed lines indicate the basins as defined in "Limits of Oceans and Seas".

The flow in the ocean is not uniform but varies with depth. Vertical circulation in the ocean is very slow compared to horizontal flow and observing the deep ocean is difficult. Defining the ocean basins based on connectivity of the entire ocean (depth and width) is therefore not possible. Froyland et al. (2014) defined ocean basins based on surface connectivity. This is achieved by creating a Markov Chain model of the surface ocean dynamics using short term time trajectory data from a global ocean model. These trajectories are of particles that move only on the surface of the ocean. The model outcome gives the probability of a particle at a certain grid point to end up somewhere else on the ocean's surface. With the model outcome a matrix can be created from which the Eigenvectors and Eigenvalues are taken. These Eigenvectors show regions of attraction, aka regions where things on the surface of the ocean (plastic, biomass, water etc.) become trapped. One of these regions is for example the Atlantic garbage patch. With this approach the five main ocean basins are still the North and South Atlantic, North and South Pacific and the Arctic Ocean, but with different boundaries between the basins. These boundaries show the lines of very little surface connectivity between the different regions which means that a particle on the ocean surface in a certain region is more likely to stay in the same region than to pass over to a different one.

== Formation of oceanic crusts and basins ==
=== Earth's structure ===
Depending on the chemical composition and the physical state, the Earth can be divided into three major components: the mantle, the core, and the crust. The crust is referred to as the outside layer of the Earth. It is made of solid rock, mostly basalt and granite. The crust that lies below sea level is known as the oceanic crust, while on land it is known as the continental crust. The former is thinner and is composed of relatively dense basalt, while the latter is less dense and mainly composed of granite. The lithosphere is composed of the crust (oceanic and continental) and the uppermost part of the mantle. The lithosphere is broken into sections called plates.

=== Processes of tectonic plates ===
Tectonic plates move very slowly (5 to 10 cm (2 to 4 inches) per year) relative to each other and interact along their boundaries. This movement is responsible for most of the Earth's seismic and volcanic activity. Depending on how the plates interact with each other, there are three types of boundaries.

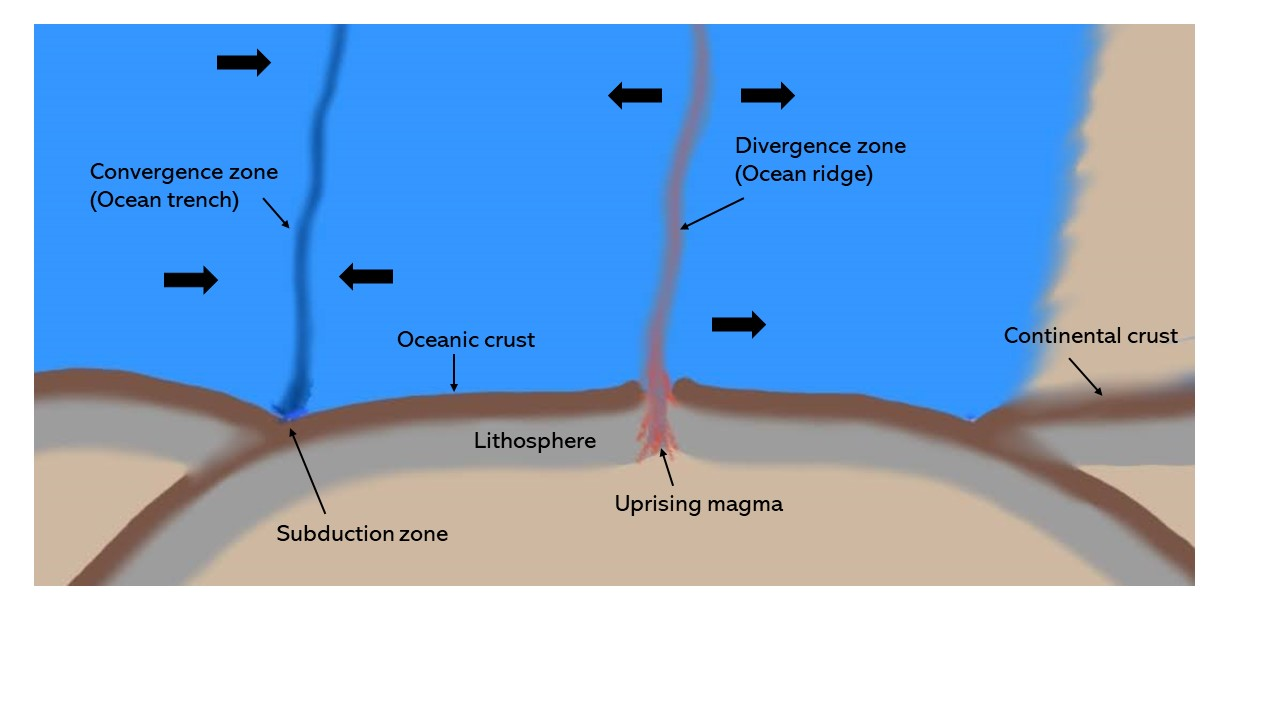
Movements of tectonic plates and the formation of oceanic ridges and trenches.

- Convergent boundary: the plates collide, and eventually the denser one slides underneath the lighter one, a process known as subduction. This type of interaction can take place between an oceanic and an oceanic crust, creating a so-called oceanic trench. It can also take place between an oceanic and a continental crust, forming a mountain range in the continent like the Andes, and it can take place between a continental and continental crust, resulting in large mountain chains, like the Himalayas.
- Divergent boundary: the plates move apart from each other. If this occurs on land a rift is formed, which eventually becomes a rift valley. The most active divergent boundaries lie under the sea. In the ocean, if magma or molten rock ascent from the mantle and fill the gap created by two diverging plates, a mid-ocean ridge is formed.
- Transform boundary: also called transform fault, occurs when the movement between the plates is horizontal, so no crust is created or destroyed. It can happen both, on land and in the sea, but most of the faults are in the oceanic crust.

=== Size of trenches ===
The Earth's deepest trench is the Mariana Trench which extends for about 2500 km (1600 miles) across the seabed. It is near the Mariana Islands, a volcanic archipelago in the West Pacific. Its deepest point is 10994 m (nearly 7 miles) below the surface of the sea.

The Earth's longest trench runs alongside the coast of Peru and Chile, reaching a depth of 8065 m (26460 feet) and extending for approximately 5900 km (3700 miles). It occurs where the oceanic Nazca plate slides under the continental South American plate and is associated with the upthrust and volcanic activity of the Andes.

== History and age of oceanic crust ==
The oldest oceanic crust is in the far western equatorial Pacific, east of the Mariana Islands. It is located far away from oceanic spreading centers, where oceanic crust is constantly created or destroyed. The oldest crust is estimated to be only around 200 million years old, compared to the age of Earth which is 4.6 billion years.

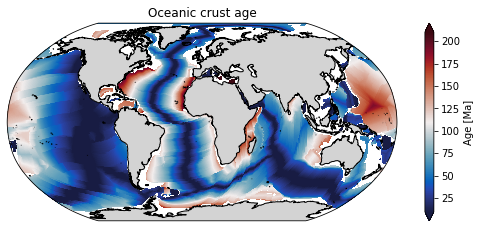
This plot shows the age of the oceanic crust. Blue indicates younger crust, red older crust. The dark blue "lines" are regions where continental shelves meet. Data from Heine, C., Yeo, L. G., & Müller, R. D. (2015).

200 million years ago nearly all land mass was one large continent called Pangea, which started to split up. During the splitting process of Pangea, some ocean basins shrunk, such as the Pacific, while others were created, such as the Atlantic and Arctic basins. The Atlantic Basin began to form around 180 million years ago, when the continent Laurasia (North America and Eurasia) started to drift away from Africa and South America. The Pacific plate grew, and subduction led to a shrinking of its bordering plates. The Pacific plate continues to move northward. Around 130 million years ago the South Atlantic started to form, as South America and Africa started to separate. At around this time India and Madagascar rifted northwards, away from Australia and Antarctica, creating seafloor around Western Australia and East Antarctica. When Madagascar and India separated between 90 and 80 million years ago, the spreading ridges in the Indian Ocean were reorganized. The northernmost part of the Atlantic Ocean was also formed at this time when Europe and Greenland separated. About 60 million years ago a new rift and oceanic ridge formed between Greenland and Europe, separating them and initiating the formation of oceanic crust in the Norwegian Sea and the Eurasian Basin in the eastern Arctic Ocean.

== Changes in ocean basins ==
=== State of the current ocean basins ===
The area occupied by the individual ocean basins has fluctuated in the past due to, amongst other, tectonic plate movements. Therefore, an oceanic basin can be actively changing size and/or depth or can be relatively inactive. The elements of an active and growing oceanic basin include an elevated mid-ocean ridge, flanking abyssal hills leading down to abyssal plains and an oceanic trench.

Changes in biodiversity, floodings and other climate variations are linked to sea-level, and are reconstructed with different models and observations (e.g., age of oceanic crust). Sea level is affected not only by the volume of the ocean basin, but also by the volume of water in them. Factors that influence the volume of the ocean basins are:

- Plate tectonics and the volume of mid-ocean ridges: the depth of the seafloor increases with distance to a ridge, as the oceanic lithosphere cools and thickens. The volume of ocean basins can be modeled using reconstructions of plate tectonics and using an age-depth relationship (see also Seafloor depth vs age).
- Marine sedimentations: these influence global mean depth and volume of the ocean, but they are difficult to determine and reconstruct.
- Passive margins and crustal extensions: to compensate the extension of continents due to continental rifting, oceanic crust decreases and therefore so does the volume of the ocean basin. However, the increase in continental area leads to a stretching and thinning of the continental crust, much of which ends up below sea level, thus again leading to an increase in ocean basin volume.

The Atlantic Ocean and the Arctic Ocean are good examples of active, growing oceanic basins, whereas the Mediterranean Sea is shrinking. The Pacific Ocean is also an active, shrinking oceanic basin, even though it has both spreading ridge and oceanic trenches. Perhaps the best example of an inactive oceanic basin is the Gulf of Mexico, which formed in Jurassic times and has been doing nothing but collecting sediments since then. The Aleutian Basin is another example of a relatively inactive oceanic basin. The Japan Basin in the Sea of Japan which formed in the Miocene, is still tectonically active although recent changes have been relatively mild.

== See also ==
- List of abyssal plains and oceanic basins
- List of oceanic landforms
- Trough (geology)
- Solid Earth
