= FEP =

FEP may refer to

- Features, events, and processes, in radioactive waste management
- Federação Escotista de Portugal, the Scouting Federation of Portugal
- Federation of European Professional Photographers
- Federation of European Publishers
- FEP Sports, a paintball equipment manufacturer
- Fluorinated ethylene propylene
- Filaments evaluation protocol, a 3D printing methodology
- Foreign education provider, in India
- Fort Edmonton Park, in Edmonton, Alberta, Canada
- Forum for European Philosophy
- Franklin Electronic Publishers, an American electronics manufacturer
- Free Egyptians Party, a political party in Egypt
- Free energy perturbation
- Free energy principle
- Free erythrocyte porphyrin
- Front endpaper
- Front-end processor
- Full electric propulsion
- Tuen Mun Ferry Pier stop, Hong Kong (MTR station code)

== See also ==
- FeP, iron phosphide
