= Contourite =

Sedimentary deposit produced by thermohaline-induced deepwater bottom currents

A contourite is a sedimentary deposit commonly formed on continental rises in lower slope settings, although it may occur anywhere that is below the storm wave base. Countourites are produced by thermohaline-induced deepwater bottom currents and may be influenced by wind or tidal forces. The geomorphology of contourite deposits is mainly influenced by the deepwater bottom-current velocity, sediment supply, and seafloor topography.

== Definition ==
The definition of the term contourite has varied throughout the decades. Originally, Heezen et al. (1966) defined the concept, without using the actual word, as a sedimentary deposit on the continental rise derived from thermohaline-induced geostrophic bottom-currents that flow parallel to bathymetric contours. They did this to emphasise the difference between these deposits and turbidites in order to explain the ubiquitous smoothness and lack of irregularities of the continental rise in the Blake-Bahama Basin. Before this, it was thought that only turbidity flows were capable of depositing and reworking sediment at depths greater than the continental slope. Hollister and Heezen (1972) adopted the name contourite for these deposits and provided a list of characteristics that described their sediments. Faugères and Stow (1993) note that as research on the subject developed, the term contourite was used to describe various forms of sedimentary deposits from bottom-currents, including those at much shallower depths and even in lacustrine settings. They suggested going back to the original definition of a contourite, that is, deposits at depths greater than 500 m derived from stable thermohaline-induced geostrophic bottom-currents (i.e., deepwater bottom-currents), in order to avoid using the same name when describing sedimentary deposits formed by different processes. They also suggest the umbrella term bottom-current deposit, which includes contourites and deposits generated by other bottom-currents.

== Flow conditions ==
Bottom current flow in the Gulf of Cadiz

Thermohaline circulation is the principal driving force of deepwater bottom currents. The term refers to the movement of water over large distances as a consequence of global oceanic density gradients. This circulation commonly travels at velocities between 2 and 20 cm/s. Note that at this velocity range, considering the general shape of the Shields diagram still holds in these conditions, a flow will only be able to continue transporting finer sediment that is already in suspension but will not be able to erode the same-sized sediment once it is deposited. However, flow velocity may be intensified as a consequence of the Coriolis force driving currents west against continental margins or as current squeezes between two ridges.

Periodically, velocities may increase dramatically or even reverse due to atmospheric storms raising the local surface eddy kinetic energy, which gets partially transmitted down to abyssal depths in episodes called benthic storms. These velocities may reach magnitudes well above 40 cm/s and vary significantly depending on the specific location. At the lower continental rise, south of Halifax, Nova Scotia, and at the lower slope around the Faeroe Islands these velocities may reach up to 73 cm/s and 75 cm/s, respectively. Bottom-current flow velocities have been measured as high as 300 cm/s in the Strait of Gibraltar. These benthic storms occur only 5 to 10 times per year and usually last between 3 and 5 days, but that is enough to heavily erode benthic sediment and keep the finer grains in suspension even after flow velocities return to normal and the bedload has been deposited. During benthic storms, the eroded sediment may be transported over thousands of kilometres and deposited rather quickly (i.e., ~1.5 cm/month) once the storm wanes. However, the net sedimentation rate over thousands of years may be much smaller (i.e. ~5.5 cm/year) due to the intense periods of erosion during benthic storms.

== Sediment supply ==
Bedform phase diagram for contourites (Stow et al. 2009)

Erosion of the seafloor contributes to the growth of a deepwater nepheloid layer. This layer plays a key role in supplying the sediment for the deposition of contourites under appropriate flow conditions.

Terrigenous sediment supply to the deepwater bottom currents and to the nepheloid layer primarily depends on climate and tectonics in the continental environment. The rate of tectonic uplift is directly related to the amount of sediment available, and variations in sea level will determine the ease with which this sediment is transported basinward. The sediment will most likely reach deepwater in the form of turbidity flows, which travel across bathymetric contours, only to be “blown” parallel to these contours as the finer sediments cross a deepwater bottom-current. Other sources of terrigenous sediment may include airborne and seaborne volcanoclastic debris.

Biogenic deposition from suspension may also supply sediment to these deepwater bottom currents. The deposition of this material has strong implications for the biology, chemistry, and flow, conditions at the time. It must occur in areas of high biogenic productivity, during periods of relatively quiet flow and, if calcareous, must also occur at depths above the carbonate compensation depth. There is also a contribution to the concentration of suspended sediment from the burrowing activity of benthic organisms.

== Geomorphology ==
The accumulation and geomorphology of contourite deposits are mainly influenced by three factors: the intensity of deepwater bottom currents, seafloor topography, and sediment supply. There are five main types of contourite accumulations: giant elongate drifts, contourite sheets, channel-related drifts, confined drifts, and modified drift-turbidite systems.

=== Giant elongated drifts ===
Sparker seismic line showing elongate drifts in the Gulf of Cadiz

Giant elongate drifts form very large mounded elongated geometries parallel to the deepwater bottom-current flow. They are characterised by a near-complete lack of parallel bedding. Mounded drifts are often bounded on one or both sides by non-depositional or erosional channels, sometimes known as moats. These drifts can be “tens to hundreds of kilometres long, tens of kilometres wide, and range from 0.1 to more than 1 km in relief above the surrounding seafloor”. Their length-to-width ratio ranges from 2:1 to 10:1. They can accumulate to thicknesses greater than 2 km and can form anywhere from the upper slope to the deepest parts of the basin, depending on the specific location of the bottom-current. Sedimentation rates range from 20 to 100 m/Ma. They tend to be finer-grained with a lot of mud, silt, and biogenic material. Coarse-grained contourites are very rare. They may also form detached or separated versions due to seafloor topography and flow conditions. Detached drifts are isolated and migrate downslope, while separated drifts are typically asymmetric in shape, tend to form at the base of a slope, and migrate up slope. Large sediment waves have been observed partially covering some giant elongate drifts.

=== Contourite sheets ===
Contourite sheets shown in reflection seismic data off the coast of Portugal

Contourite sheets are broad, low-relief features that extend through very large areas (i.e., ~1,000,000 km2) and are seen covering the abyssal plains or even plastered against the continental margins. They are characteristic of very deep water. They have a relatively constant thickness of up to a few hundred metres with a slight thinning towards the continental margin.

Sediment wave fields are a variety that are generally located near the rise-to-slope transition. Seismic reflection profiles show that the sediment waves tend to migrate up-slope.

=== Channel-related drifts ===
Channel-related drifts form when deepwater bottomcurrents are confined to a smaller cross-sectional area of flow, and therefore their velocity increases substantially. This can happen if the deepwater bottom-current is trapped within a deep channel or within a gateway that connects two basins. Due to the high velocities, it is common to see scours and erosional features, as well as different types of deposits at the floor of the channel, the flanks, and the down-current exit of the channel.

Flank deposits are usually patchy and small (tens of km^{2}), can be elongate and subparallel to the flow direction, and may have a sheeted or mounded geometry. At the down-current exit of the channel, flow velocity decreases dramatically, and a cone-shaped contourite fan is formed, which is much larger than the flank deposits, measuring about 100 km in radius and about 300 m in thickness. Channel floor deposits can be patchy and contain sand, gravel, and mud clasts in the form of a channel lag.

=== Confined drifts ===
Confined drifts are contourite accumulations that occur within small basins. The basins in which they form tend to be tectonically active in order to allow for the topographic confinement of the deposit.

=== Modified drift-turbidite systems ===
Modified drift-turbidite systems refer to the interactions of contourite and turbidite deposits. These can be observed as modifications of one another, depending on the dominant process at the time. Examples range from asymmetric turbidite channel levees caused by strong deepwater bottom-currents, as seen in the Nova Scotian Margin, to alternations in turbidite/debrite and contourite deposits both in time and space, as seen in the Hebridean Margin. The Caledonia and Judith Fancy formations in St. Croix were studied by Stanley (1993) in which he found an ancient analogue of an alternating turbidite and contourite deposit and generated a stratigraphic model of a continuum from a turbidite dominant environment to a contourite dominant one.

Distinguishing turbidites, contourites, and bottom-current modified turbidite deposits is essential for reconstructing the paleoenvironment in deepwater settings. Traction structures, such as cross-stratification, indicate bottom-current reworking because it is more likely to have avalanches in clear bottom-currents than it is in sediment-saturated turbidity flows. Deposition from suspension in turbidity flows does not generate a sharp upper contact as bottom-current reworked deposits show due to the highly oscillating energy conditions. Stanley (1993) proposes that the transition from a turbidite to a contourite involves a continuous transition from a sandy deposit to lenticular bedding passing through wavy bedding.

== Occurrence ==
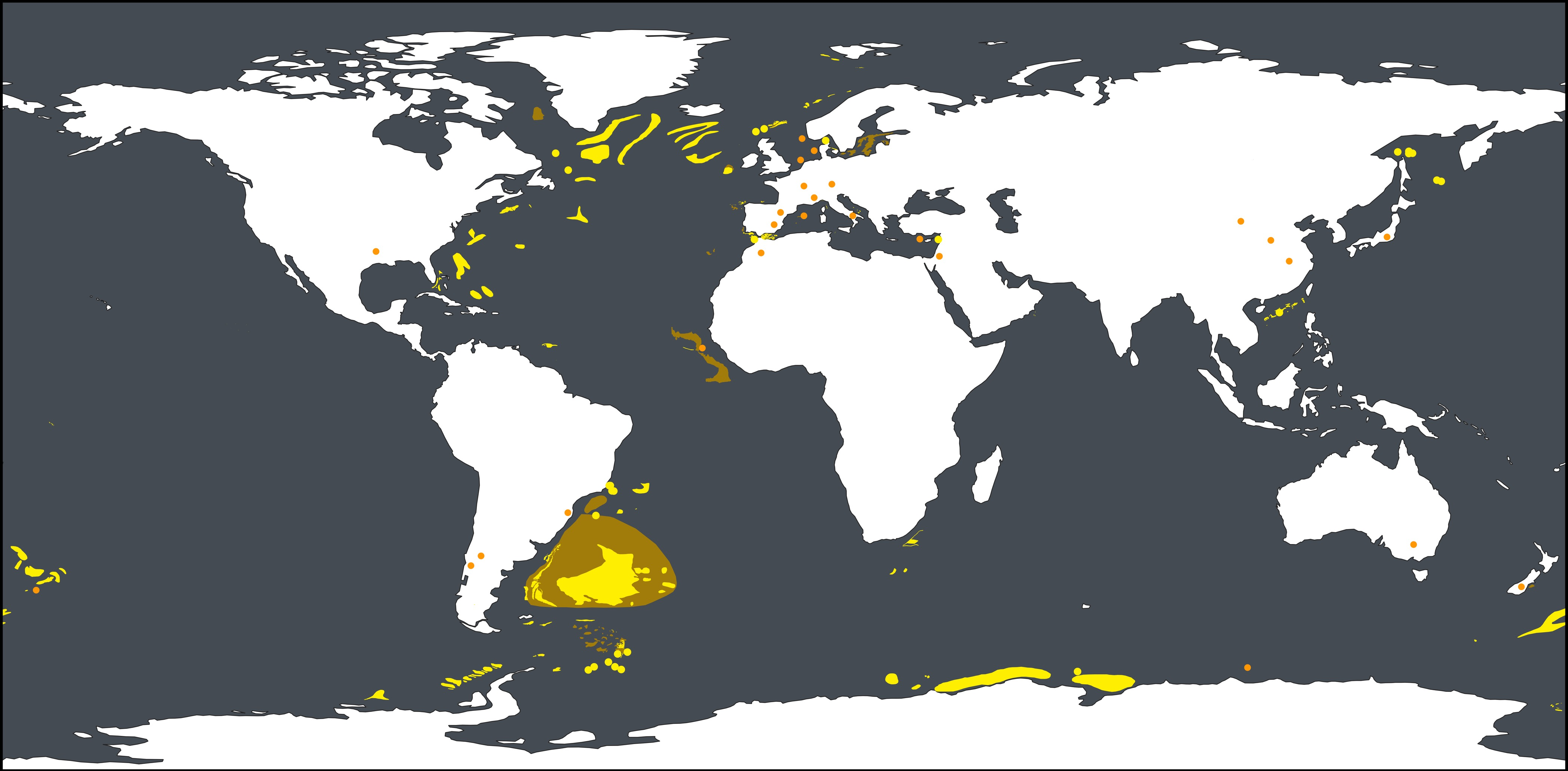
A Global map of recent and fossil contourite deposits, and larger accumulations of recent contourite deposits are summarised under contourite depositional systems .

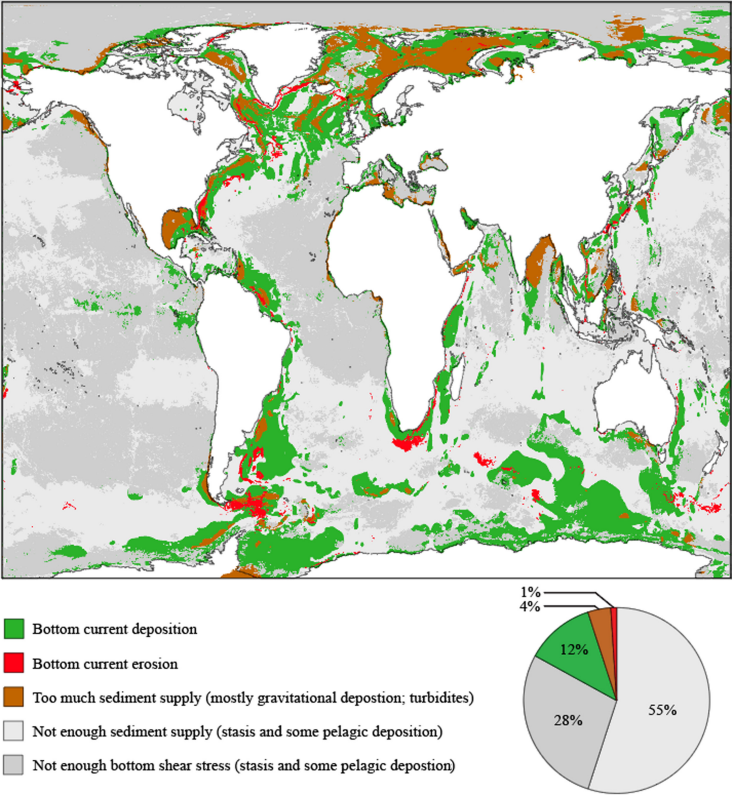
Map showing contourite deposition (green). (2) Too much bottom shear stress (red). (3) Too much sediment supply (brown). (4) Not enough sediment supply (light grey). (5) Not enough bottom shear stress (dark grey).

=== Present day ===
Contourite deposition is active in many locations throughout the world, but particularly in areas affected by the thermohaline circulation.

=== Ancient examples ===
Identifying contourites in ancient sedimentary sequences is difficult as their distinctive morphology becomes obscured by the effects of later bioturbation, sedimentation, erosion, and compaction. Most examples of contourites identified in the geological record come from the Cenozoic, but examples have been noted as far back as the Ediacaran.

== See also ==
- Tempestite
- Turbidite
