= Tempestite =

Sediment type deposited by storms

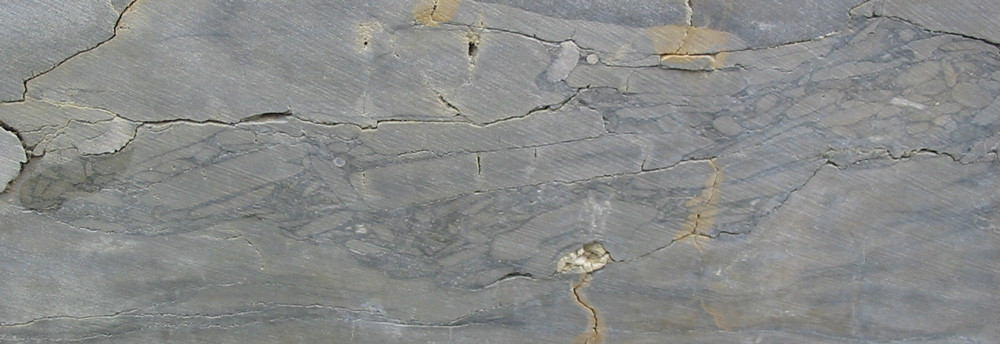
Tempestite in Estonia (Silurian dolomite)

Tempestites are storm deposits that can be recognized throughout the geologic record. They are studied in the scientific disciplines of sedimentary geology and paleotempestology. The deposits derive their meaning from the word tempest, a violent storm. Tempestites are preserved in a multitude of sedimentary environments, including delta systems, estuarine systems, coastal environments, deep-sea environments, and freshwater lacustrine environments. Tempestites most often form in wave-dominated delta systems and preserve, within the sedimentary record, evidence of events and processes below fair-weather wave base and above storm-weather wave base. They are commonly characterized by hummocky cross-stratified beds that have an erosive base and can form under combined flow regimes. This erosive base is often seen in the form of gutter casts.

== Sequencing ==
Tempestites had been identified in the rock record for a long time; however, the exact sequence of sedimentary structures that are commonly seen in the rock record, known as the idealized sequence, was not described until 1979 by Dott and Bourgeois. This idealized sequence follows the order of a hummocky cross stratified layer (H) often with sole markings on the base, followed by a planar laminated layer (F) synonymous to the lower place bed, followed by a cross laminated layer (X) preserved as ripple marks in plan view, and finally topped with a muddy layer (M) which is generally interpreted to be caused by suspensions settling of finer material during the waning period of the storm. Each one of these sedimentary structures can be affected by bioturbation when organisms living in the sediment at the time burrow through it. Bioturbation can be a great indicator of the depth of the water column in which the tempestite was deposited, in a given study area, through the use of ichnology, as certain organisms will only persist at certain depths and will generate unique markings within the sedimentary structures that can be identified. However, excessive bioturbation can destroy the preservation of sedimentary structures and essentially make the bed massive, making confident interpretation of a tempestite much more difficult for geologists. Tempestites can also amalgamate due to their erosive bases, and this will cause portions of the idealized H-F-X-M sequence to repeat, as each storm event has eroded down into the sediment that was deposited by the last, and incorporates that sediment into its own deposit.

== Significance and usage ==
Tempestite deposits are very useful for aiding in paleoecological and paleogeographical interpretations. As storms that generate tempestite deposits can only form between 5 degrees and 20 degrees north and south latitude (with even the largest 1000-year storm only being preserved upwards of 35 degrees latitude), accurate recognition of a tempestite deposit within the rock record allows for confident interpretation of a range of latitudes. Since hummocky cross stratification forms during combined flow and waning oscillatory-flow current regimes, the preserved amplitudes of their hummocks and swales reflect storm intensity. Once it is understood where the deposit in question was deposited relative to the paleo-shoreline, which can usually be done using the ichnological data preserved in the same location, the hummock amplitudes/wavelengths, grain size (decreases with an increase in paleo water depth), and bedding thickness (decreases with an increase in paleo water depth) can be used to estimate the storm intensity/energy.

An understanding of past storm intensity has significant implications for how it might evolve with climate change today. During the Cretaceous, CO_{2} levels were much higher and the global temperature was much higher. With an understanding of how storm intensity has changed over this period, we can begin to understand how it will change as our climate changes.

Tempestite deposits are also highly sought-after petroleum reservoirs, as they are large, laterally continuous, sheet-like deposits that can hold high volumes of petroleum with good permeability and porosity.

== See also ==
- Contourite
- Turbidite
