= Paleotempestology =

Study of past tropical cyclone activity

Paleotempestology is the study of past tropical cyclone activity by means of geological proxies as well as historical documentary records. The term was coined by American meteorologist Kerry Emanuel.

The usual approach in paleotempestology is the identification of deposits left by storms. Most commonly, these are overwash deposits in waterbodies close to the coast; other means are oxygen isotope ratio variations caused by tropical cyclone rainfall in trees or speleothems (cave deposits), and identifying beach ridges kicked up by storm waves. The occurrence rate of tropical cyclones can then be inferred from these deposits and sometimes also their intensity – typically the stronger events are the most easily recognizable ones –, by comparing them to deposits left by historical events.

Paleotempestological research has shown that in the Coast of the Gulf of Mexico and in Australia, the occurrence rate of intense tropical cyclones is about once every few centuries, and there are long-term variations in occurrence which are caused, for example, by shifts in their paths. Common problems in paleotempestology are confounding factors such as tsunami-generated deposits, and the fact that only some parts of the world have been investigated.

== History ==
The idea that sediments emplaced by tropical cyclones could be used to reconstruct tropical cyclone history in prehistoric times was developed in the middle 20th century. The earliest publication with this idea was by McKee in 1959, and was inspired by deposits left by Typhoon Ophelia on Jaluit Atoll in 1958, and drew increased attention in the 1990s. The name is a reference to "tempest", "storm".

== Definition and rationale ==
Paleotempestology is the estimation of tropical cyclone activity with the help of proxy data. The name was coined by Kerry Emanuel of the Massachusetts Institute of Technology; the field has seen increased activity since the 1990s and studies were first carried out in the United States of America on the East Coast.

The realisation that one cannot rely solely on historical records to infer past storm activity was a major driving force for the development of paleotempestology. The historical record in many places is too short (one century at most) to properly determine the hazard produced by tropical cyclones, especially the rare very intense ones which at times are undersampled by historical records; in the United States, for example, only about 150 years of record are available, and only a small number of hurricanes classified as category 4 or 5 – the most destructive ones on the Saffir-Simpson scale – have come ashore, making it difficult to estimate the hazard level. Such records may also not be representative for future weather patterns.

Information about past tropical cyclone occurrences can be used to constrain how their occurrences may change in the future, or about how they respond to large-scale climate modes, such as sea surface temperature changes, or to check the accuracy of climate models. In general, the origin and behaviour of tropical cyclone systems is poorly understood, and there is concern that human-caused global warming will increase the intensity of tropical cyclones and the frequency of strong events by increasing sea surface temperatures.

== Techniques ==
In general, paleotempestology is a complex field of science that overlaps with other disciplines like climatology and coastal geomorphology. A number of techniques have been used to estimate the past hazards from tropical cyclones. Many of these techniques have also been applied to studying extratropical storms, although research on this field is less advanced than on tropical cyclones.

=== Overwash deposits ===
Overwash deposits in coastal atolls, coastal lakes, marshes or reef flats or even archeological sites are the most important paleoclimatological evidence of tropical cyclone strikes. When storms hit these areas, currents and waves can overtop barriers, erode these and other beach structures, and lay down deposits in the water bodies behind barriers. Isolated breaches and especially widespread overtopping of coastal barriers during storms can generate fan-like, layered deposits behind the barrier. Individual layers can be correlated to particular storms in favourable circumstances; in addition they are often separated by a clear boundary from earlier sediments. Such deposits have been observed in North Carolina after Hurricane Isabel in 2003, for example. The intensity and impacts of the tropical cyclone can also be inferred from overwash deposits by comparing the deposits to these formed by known storms and analyzing their lithology (their physical characteristics). Additionally, thicker sediment layers usually correspond to stronger storm systems. This procedure is not always clear-cut however.

Several techniques have been applied to separate out storm overwash deposits from other sediments:

- Compared to the normal sedimentation processes in such places, tropical cyclone deposits are rougher and can be detected with sieving, laser-dependent technologies or x-ray fluorescence techniques.
- In sediment cores, deposits formed by tropical cyclones may be denser due to a larger proportion of mineral content associated with overwashes, which can be detected with x-ray fluorescence techniques.
- They may contain less organic matter than deposits formed through steady sedimentation, which can be detected by combusting the deposits and measuring the resulting mass loss. This and sediment grain sizes are the most common research tools for sediment cores.
- A little used technique is the analysis of organic material in sediment cores; there are characteristic changes in carbon and nitrogen isotope ratios after flooding and the entering of seawater, including a general increase in biological productivity.
- Overwash deposits can contain elements that do not normally occur at the site, such as strontium; this can be detected with x-ray fluorescence techniques.
- Overwash deposits have usually brighter colors than those generated during steady sedimentation and different quantities of coarse fragments.
- Storm surges can transport living structures into such deposits that do not normally occur in these settings. Droughts or the entry of water unrelated to a storm can confound such records, however. Thus, this method is often supplemented with other proxies. The most common living structure employed here are foraminifera, although bivalves, diatoms, dinoflagellates, ostracods and pollen have also been used. Marine foraminifera, however, are not always present in deposits formed by historical storms.

Generally, sites suitable for obtaining paleotempestology records are not found along the entire length of the coastline, and depending on the properties of the site such as vegetation cover, they might only track storms approaching from a certain direction. Prerequisites for successful correlation of overwash deposits to tropical cyclones are:

- The absence of tsunamis in the region, as their deposits can usually not be easily distinguished from storm deposits.
- The investigation area should have low biological activity, as bioturbation can otherwise erase evidence of storm deposits. Low biological activity can be found in sites with high salt or low oxygen concentrations.
- A high geomorphic stability of the site.
- High sedimentation rates can facilitate the preservation of storm deposits.
- Tides can destroy layered storm deposits; thus non-tidal waterbodies are ideally used. In tidally active waterbodies, correlations involving various sediment cores can be applied.

==== Dating and intensity determination ====
Various dating techniques can then be used to produce a chronology of tropical cyclone strikes at a given location and thus a recurrence rate; for example, at Lake Shelby in Alabama a return period of once every 318 years was determined. The storms in the Lake Shelby record have windspeeds of over 190 kilometres per hour (120 mph) as Hurricane Ivan which in 2004 made landfall in the region at that intensity did not leave a deposit. Based on geological considerations the minimum windspeed of storms recorded there might be 230 kilometres per hour (143 mph).

For dating purposes radiometric dating procedures involving carbon-14, cesium-137, and lead-210 are most commonly used, often in combination. Uranium series dating, optically stimulated luminescence, and correlations to human land use can also be used in some places.

=== Beach ridges ===
Beach ridges and cheniers form when storm surges, storm waves or tides deposit debris in ridges, with one ridge typically corresponding to one storm. Ridges can be formed by coral rubble where coral reefs lie at the coast, and can contain complicated layer structures, shells, pumice, and gravel. A known example is the ridge that Cyclone Bebe generated on Funafuti atoll in 1971.

Beach ridges are common on the deltaic shores of China, and are indicative of increased typhoon activity. They have also been found on the Australian coast facing the Great Barrier Reef and are formed from reworked corals. The height of each ridge appears to correlate with the intensity of the storm that produced it, and thus the intensity of the forming storm can be inferred by numerical modelling and comparison to known storms and known storm surges. Ridges tend to be older the farther inland they are; they can also be dated through optically stimulated luminescence and radiocarbon dating. In addition, no tsunami-generated beach ridges have been observed, and tsunamis are important confounding factors in paleotempestology.

Wind-driven erosion or accumulation can alter the elevation of such ridges, and, in addition, the same ridge can be formed by more than one storm event as has been observed in Australia. Beach ridges can also shift around through non-storm processes after their formation and can form through non-tropical cyclone processes. Sedimentary texture can be used to infer the origin of a ridge from storm surges.

=== Isotope ratios ===
Precipitation in tropical cyclones has a characteristic isotope composition with a depletion of heavy oxygen isotopes; carbon and nitrogen isotope data have also been used to infer tropical cyclone activity. Corals can store oxygen isotope ratios which in turn reflect water temperatures, precipitation and evaporation; these in turn can be related to tropical cyclone activity. Fish otoliths and bivalves can also store such records, as can trees where the oxygen isotope ratios of precipitation are reflected in the cellulose of trees, and can be inferred with the help of tree rings. However, confounding factors like natural variation and soil properties also influence oxygen isotope ratios of tree cellulose. For these reasons, only the frequency of storms can be reliably estimated from tree ring isotopic records, not their intensity. Other materials that can preserve such isotopic evidence include peat.

Speleothems, deposits formed in caves through the dissolution and redeposition of dolomite and limestone, can store isotope signatures associated with tropical cyclones, especially in fast growing speleothems, areas with thin soils and speleothems which have undergone little alteration. Such deposits have a high temporal resolution, and are also protected from many confounding factors although the extraction of annual layers has become possible only recently, with a two-week resolution (two separate layers correlated to two hurricanes that struck two weeks apart) achieved in one case. However, the suitability of speleothems depends on the characteristics of the cave they are found in; caves that flood frequently may have their speleothems eroded or otherwise damaged, for example, making them less suitable for paleotempestology research. Caves where speleothems form mainly during the offseason are also likely to miss tropical cyclones, and distinguishing between a tropical cyclone and precipitation events not linked to tropical cyclones can be difficult. Very old records can be obtained from oxygen isotope ratios in rocks.

=== Other techniques ===
Historical documents such as county gazettes in China, diaries, logbooks of travellers, official histories and old newspapers can contain information on tropical cyclones. In China such records go back over a millennium, while elsewhere it is usually confined to the last 130 years. Such historical records however are often ambiguous or unclear, they only record landfalling storms and sometimes confuse non-tropical systems or intense convective storms for tropical cyclones. The frequency of shipwrecks has been used to infer past tropical cyclone occurrence, such as has been done with a database of shipwrecks that the Spaniards suffered in the Caribbean and with wrecks in the Paracel Islands in the South China Sea.

Aside from oxygen isotope ratios, tree rings can also record information on storm-caused plant damage or vegetation changes, such as thin tree rings due to storm-induced damage to a tree canopy, and saltwater intrusion and the resulting slowdown in tree growth. The term "dendrotempestology" is used in this context. The tree ring approach tends to measure rainy storms rather than strong storms, and cannot always distinguish tropical cyclones from other weather systems. Speleothems can also store trace elements which can signal tropical cyclone activity and mud layers formed by storm-induced cave flooding. Droughts on the other hand can cause groundwater levels to drop enough that subsequent storms cannot induce flooding and thus fail to leave a record, as has been noted in Yucatan.

Other techniques:

- Rhythmites in river mouths. These are formed when storms resuspend sediments; when the storm wanes, the sediments fall out and form the deposits, especially in places with high sediment supplies. Carbon isotope and chemical data can be used to distinguish them from non-storm sedimentation.
- Sand dunes on coastlines are influenced by storm surge height, and sand splays can be formed when sand is swept off these dunes by storm surges and waves; such deposits however are better studied in the context of tsunamis and there is no clear way to distinguish between tsunami- and storm-formed splays.
- Hummocky deposits in shallow seas, known as tempestites. The mechanics of their formation are still controversial, and such deposits are prone to reworking which wipes out the traces of a storm.
- Boulders and coral blocks can be moved by storms and such moved blocks can potentially be dated to obtain the age of the storm, if certain conditions are met. They can be correlated to storms with the help of oxygen isotope excursions for example. This technique has also been applied to islands formed by storm-moved blocks.
- Wave-driven erosion during storms can create scarps which can be dated with the assistance of optically-stimulated luminescence. Such scarps however tend to be altered over time – later storms can erode away older scarps, for example – and their preservation and formation is often strongly dependent on the local geology.
- Other techniques involve the identification of freshwater flood deposits by storms such as humic acid and other evidence in corals, and lack of bromine – which is common in marine sediments – in flood-related deposits, and oyster bed kills caused by sediments suspended by storms (oyster kills however can also be caused by non-storm phenomena).
- Luminescence of coral deposits has been used to infer tropical cyclone activity.
- Tridacna shells record trace elements on daily or hourly basis, as well as growth impairments caused by tropical cyclones.
- Structures in submarine karst areas, like blue holes and submarine caves, accumulate sediments as there is little erosion and currents transport sediment into the depressions. During storms, larger quantities of often rougher sediments are transported, forming distinct storm layers. Identifying storm layers out of the normal sedimentation can be a challenge.
- Tree-ring growth from wooded regions may also show eccentricities resulting from powerful storm winds.

=== Timespans ===
A database of tropical cyclones going back to 6,000 BC has been compiled for the western North Atlantic Ocean. In the Gulf of Mexico, records go back five millennia but only a few typhoon (Note: Typhoons are tropical cyclones in the West Pacific.) records go back 5,000–6,000 years. In general, tropical cyclone records do not go farther back than 5,000–6,000 years ago when the Holocene sea level rise levelled off; tropical cyclone deposits formed during sea level lowstands likely were reworked during sea level rise. Only tentative evidence exists of deposits from the last interglacial. Tempestite deposits and oxygen isotope ratios in much older rocks have also been used to infer the existence of tropical cyclone activity as far back as the Jurassic.

== Results ==
Paleotempestological information has been used by the insurance industry in risk analysis in order to set insurance rates. The industry has also funded paleotempestological research. Paleotempestology information is further of interest to archeologists, ecologists, and forest and water resource managers.

=== Recurrence rates ===
The recurrence rate, the time gap between storms, is an important metric used to estimate tropical cyclone risk, and it can be determined by paleotempestological research. In the Gulf of Mexico, catastrophic hurricane strikes at given locations occur once about every 350 years in the last 3,800 years or about 0.48%–0.39% annual frequency at any given site, with a recurrence rate of 300 years or 0.33% annual probability at sites in the Caribbean and Gulf of Mexico; category 3 or more storms occur at a rate of 3.9–0.1 category 3 or more storms per century in the northern Gulf of Mexico. Elsewhere, tropical cyclones with intensities of category 4 or more occur about every 350 years in the Pearl River Delta (China), one storm every 100–150 years at Funafuti and a similar rate in French Polynesia, one category 3 or stronger every 471 years in St. Catherines Island (Georgia), 0.3% each year for an intense storm in eastern Hainan, one storm every 140–180 years in Nicaragua, one intense storm every 200–300 years in the Great Barrier Reef – formerly their recurrence rate was estimated to be one strong event every few millennia – and one storm of category 2–4 intensity every 190–270 years at Shark Bay in Western Australia. Steady rates have been found for the Gulf of Mexico and the Coral Sea for timespans of several millennia.

However, it has also been found that the occurrence rates of tropical cyclone measured with instrumental data over historical time can be significantly different from the actual occurrent rate. In the past, tropical cyclones were far more frequent in the Great Barrier Reef and the northern Gulf of Mexico than today; in Apalachee Bay, strong storms occur every 40 years, not every 400 years as documented historically. Serious storms in New York occurred twice in 300 years not once every millennium or less. In general, the area of Australia appears to be unusually inactive in recent times by the standards of the past 550–1500 years, and the historical record underestimates the incidence of strong storms in Northeastern Australia.

=== Long term fluctuations ===
Long-term variations of tropical cyclone activity have also been found. The Gulf of Mexico saw increased activity between 3,800 and 1,000 years ago with a fivefold increase of category 4–5 hurricane activity, and activity at St. Catherines Island and Wassaw Island was also higher between 2,000 and 1,100 years ago. This appears to be a stage of increased tropical cyclone activity spanning the region from New York to Puerto Rico, while the last 1,000 years have been inactive both there and in the Gulf Coast. Before 1400 AD, the Caribbean and the Gulf of Mexico were active while the East Coast of the United States was inactive, followed by a reversal that lasted until 1675 AD; in an alternative interpretation, the US Atlantic coast and the Caribbean saw low activity between 950 AD and 1700 with a sudden increase around 1700. It is unclear whether in the Atlantic hurricane activity is more regionally modulated or basin-wide. Such fluctuations appear to mainly concern strong tropical cyclone systems, at least in the Atlantic; weaker systems have a more steady pattern of activity. Rapid fluctuations over short timespans have also been observed.

In the Atlantic Ocean, the so-called "Bermuda High" hypothesis stipulates that changes in the position of this anticyclone can cause storm paths to alternate between landfalls on the East Coast and the Gulf Coast but also Nicaragua. Paleotempestological data support this theory although additional findings on Long Island and Puerto Rico have demonstrated that storm frequency is more complex as active periods appear to correlate between the three sites. A southward shift of the High has been inferred to have occurred 3,000–1,000 years ago, and has been linked with the "hurricane hyperactivity" period in the Gulf of Mexico between 3,400 and 1,000 years ago. Conversely a decrease in hurricane activity is recorded after the mid-millennium period and after 1,100 the Atlantic changes from a pattern of widespread activity to a more geographically confined one. Between 1,100–1,450 the Bahamas and the Florida Gulf Coast were frequently struck while between 1,450–1,650 activity was higher in New England. Furthermore, a tendency to a more northerly storm track may be associated with a strong North Atlantic Oscillation while the Neoglacial cooling is associated with a southward shift. In West Asia, high activity in the South China Sea and the southern parts of the basin coincides with low activity in Japan and mid-latitudes and vice versa.

=== Role of climate modes ===
The influence of natural trends on tropical cyclone activity has been recognized in paleotempestology records, such as a correlation between Atlantic hurricane tracks and activity with the status of the ITCZ; position of the Loop Current (for Gulf of Mexico hurricanes); El Niño-Southern Oscillation activity; North Atlantic Oscillation both in East Asia and the Atlantic; sea surface temperatures and the strength of the West African Monsoon; ENSO activity and Sahara dust with East Asian typhoons; and Australian cyclone activity and the Pacific Decadal Oscillation. Increased insolation – either from solar activity or from orbital variations – have been found to be detrimental to tropical cyclone activity in some regions In the first millennium AD, warmer sea surface temperatures in the Atlantic as well as more restricted anomalies may be responsible for stronger regional hurricane activity. but not in the northeastern Gulf of Mexico. The climate mode dependency of tropical cyclone activity may be more pronounced in temperate regions where tropical cyclones find less favourable conditions.

Among the known climate modes that influence tropical cyclone activity in paleotempestological records are ENSO phase variations, which influence tropical cyclone activity in Australia and the Atlantic, but also their path as has been noted for typhoons. More general global correlations have been found, such as a negative correlation between tropical cyclone activity in Japan on the one hand and the North Atlantic, Gulf of Thailand and South China on the other hand, and a correlation between the Atlantic and Australia on the one hand and between Australia and French Polynesia on the other hand.

=== Influence of long-term temperature variations ===
The effect of general climate variations have also been found. Hurricane and typhoon tracks tend to shift north (e.g. Amur Bay) during warm periods and south (e.g. South China) during cold periods, patterns that might be mediated by shifts in the subtropical anticyclones. These patterns (northward shift with warming) has been observed as a consequence of human-induced global warming and the end of the Little Ice Age but also after volcanic eruptions (southward shift with cooling); some volcanic eruptions have been linked to decreased hurricane activity, although this observation is not universal.

The Dark Ages Cold Period has been linked to decreased activity off Belize. Initially the Medieval Climate Anomaly featured increased activity across the Atlantic, but later activity decreased along the US East Coast. During the 1350 to present interval in the Little Ice Age, there were more but weaker storms in the Gulf of Mexico while hurricane activity did not decrease in western Long Island. Colder waters may have impeded tropical cyclone activity in the Gulf of Mexico during the Little Ice Age. Increased hurricane activity during the last 300 years in the Caribbean may also correlate to the Little Ice Age. The Little Ice Age may have been accompanied by more but weaker storms in the South China Sea relative to preceding or following periods, leading to increased ship loss rates.

The response of tropical cyclones to future global warming is of great interest. The Holocene Climatic Optimum did not induce increased tropical cyclone strikes in Queensland and phases of higher hurricane activity on the Gulf Coast are not associated with global warming; however warming has been correlated with typhoon activity in the Gulf of Thailand and hurricane activity on the Yucatan Peninsula, and marine warming with typhoon activity in the South China Sea, increased hurricane activity in Belize (which increased during the Medieval Warm Period) and during the Mesozoic when carbon dioxide caused warming episodes such as the Toarcian anoxic event.

=== After-effects of tropical cyclones ===
A correlation between hurricane strikes and subsequent wildfire activity and vegetation changes has been noted in the Alabamian and Cuban paleotempestological record. In St. Catherines Island, cultural activity ceased at the time of increased storm activity, and both Taino settlement of the Bahamas and Polynesian expansion across the Pacific may have been correlated to decreased tropical cyclone activity. Tropical cyclone induced alteration in oxygen isotope ratios may mask isotope ratio variations caused by other climate phenomena, which may thus be misinterpreted.

On the other hand, the Classic Maya collapse may or may not coincide with, and have been caused by, a decrease in tropical cyclone activity. Tropical cyclones are important for preventing droughts in the southeastern US. Paleotempestology has found evidence that the Kamikaze typhoons that impeded the Mongol invasions of Japan did, in fact, exist.

=== Other patterns ===
Sites in the Bahamas show more strong storms in the northern Bahamas than the southern ones, presumably because storms approaching the southern Bahamas have passed over the Greater Antilles before and have lost much of their intensity there. Atmospheric conditions favourable for tropical cyclone activity in the "main development region" (Note: The "main development region" is an area between 10° and 20° northern latitude and between 20° and 60° western longitude in the Atlantic where numerous hurricanes form.) of the Atlantic are correlated to unfavourable conditions along the East Coast. The anti-correlation between Gulf of Mexico and Bahamas activity with the US East Coast activity may be due to active hurricane seasons – which tend to increase storm activity in the former – being accompanied by unfavourable climatological conditions along the East Coast. A similar dipole exists between Yucatan on the one hand and Bahamas-East Coast on the other hand and might be due to ITCZ shifts and changes in anticyclone position.

== Problems ==
Paleotempestological reconstructions are subject to a number of limitations, including the presence of sites suited for the obtainment of paleotempestological records, changes in the hydrological properties of the site due to e.g. sea level rise which increases the sensitivity to weaker storms and "false positives" caused by for example non-tropical cyclone-related floods, sediment winnowing, wind-driven transport, tides, tsunamis, bioturbation and non-tropical storms such as nor'easters or winter storm, the latter of which however usually result in lower surges. In particular, tsunamis are a problem for paleotempestological studies in the Indian and Pacific Ocean; one technique that has been used to differentiate the two is the identification of traces of runoff which occurs during storms but not during tsunamis. Coastal paleotempestology records are based on storm surge, and do not always reflect wind speeds, e.g in large and slow-moving storms.

Not all of the world has been investigated with paleotempestological methods; among the places thus researched are Belize, the Carolinas of North America, northern coasts of the Gulf of Mexico, the northeastern United States, (in a lesser measure) the South Pacific islands and tropical Australia. Conversely China, Cuba, Florida, Hispaniola, Honduras, the Lesser Antilles and North America north of Canada are poorly researched. The presence of research institutions active in paleotempestology and suitable sites for paleotempestological research and tropical cyclone landfalls may influence whether a given location is researched or not. In the Atlantic Ocean, research has been concentrated on regions where hurricanes are common rather than more marginal areas.

Paleotempestology records mostly record activity during the Holocene and tend to record mainly catastrophic storms as these are the ones most likely to leave evidence. In addition, as of 2017 there has been little effort in making comprehensive databases of paleotempestological data or in attempting regional reconstructions from local results. Different sites have different intensity thresholds and thus capture different storm populations, and the same layer can be caused by a landfall of a weaker storm closer to the site or a landfall at a larger distance of a stronger storm.

Also, paleotempestological records, especially overwash records in marshes, are often grossly incomplete with questionable geochronology. Deposition mechanism are poorly documented, and it is often not clear how to identify storm deposits. The magnitude of overwash deposits is fundamentally a function of storm surge height, which, however, is not a function of storm intensity. Overwash deposits are regulated by the height of the overwashed barrier and there is no expectation that it will remain stable over time; tropical cyclones themselves have been observed eroding such barriers and such barrier height decreases (e.g. through storm erosion or sea level rise) may induce a spurious increase of tropical cyclone deposits over time. Successive overwash deposits can be difficult to distinguish, and they are easily eroded by subsequent storms. Storm deposits can vary strongly even a short distance from the landfall point, even over few tens of metres, and changes in tropical cyclone activity recorded at one site might simply reflect the stochastic nature of tropical cyclone landfalls. In particular, in core tropical cyclone activity regions weather variations rather than large-scale modes may control tropical cyclone activity.

== Application to non-tropical storms ==
Paleotempestological research has been mostly carried out in low-latitude regions but research in past storm activity has been conducted in the British Isles, France, the Mediterranean and the North American Great Lakes. Increases in storm activity on the European Atlantic coast have been noted AD 1350–1650, AD 250–850, AD 950–550, 1550–1350 BC, 3550–3150 BC, and 5750–5150 BC. In southern France, a recurrence rate of 0.2% per year of catastrophic storms has been inferred for the last 2,000 years.

Storm records indicate increased storm activity during colder periods such as the Little Ice Age, Medieval Dark Age and Iron Age Cold Epoch. During cold periods, increased temperature gradients between the polar and low-latitude regions increase baroclinic storm activity. Changes in the North Atlantic Oscillation may also play a role.

During the last millenary, the cross-referencing of sedimentological data with historical archives in Western Europe has also highlighted the intense storms of 1351–1352, 1469, 1645, 1711 and 1751, which caused severe damage and long-lasting flooding along much of Europe's coastline.

== See also ==
- Tropical cyclone
- Tropical cyclone observation
- Tropical cyclones and climate change
