= Benthic storms =

Episodic periods of increased bottom-water turbidity

A benthic storm, also known as a deep-sea storm, is an episodic period of intense bottom current that is capable of sediment resuspension in the deep ocean, typically associated with enhanced bottom-water turbidity. They form in response to the instability of surface currents. This leads to the formation of strong cyclonic and anticyclones currents throughout the water column. They are able to generate deep cyclones, anticyclones, and/or topographic waves. These create currents with sufficient bed-shear stress to erode and resuspend sediment from the sea floor that initiates or enhances benthic storms. Particulate matter eroded from the seafloor by the bottom currents also go into forming a nepheloid layer.

== Occurrence ==
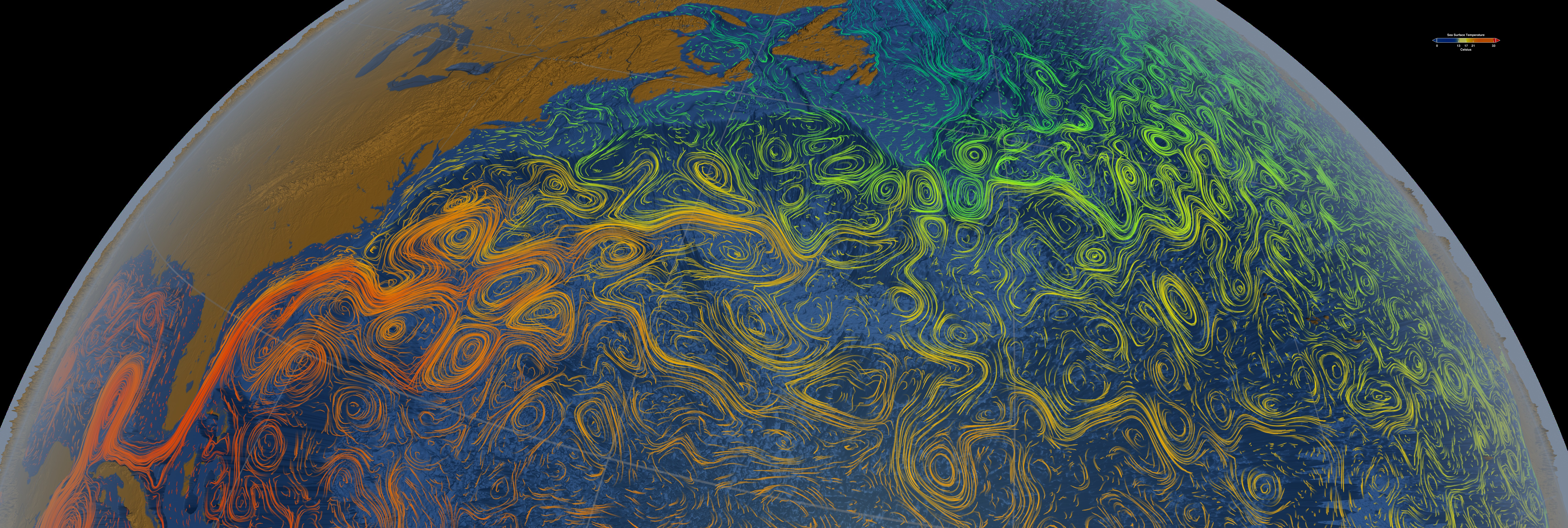
Benthic storms often occur with Gulf Stream meanders.

Benthic storms are most frequently occurring beneath Gulf Stream meanders and its associated rings. Other areas where they occur frequently include the New England Seamounts and the North Atlantic Current near the Flemish Cap. They have also been observed in other areas with energetic surface ocean currents, including the Argentine Basin, the Agulhas Retroflection Zone, the Gulf of Mexico, and the Gulf of Lions in the Mediterranean and areas of the Southern Ocean. In the Kuroshio Extension, enhanced bottom currents were observed without increased turbidity. Some observation suggests they could also occur in the eastern tropical Pacific where polymetallic nodules exist.

== Mechanism ==
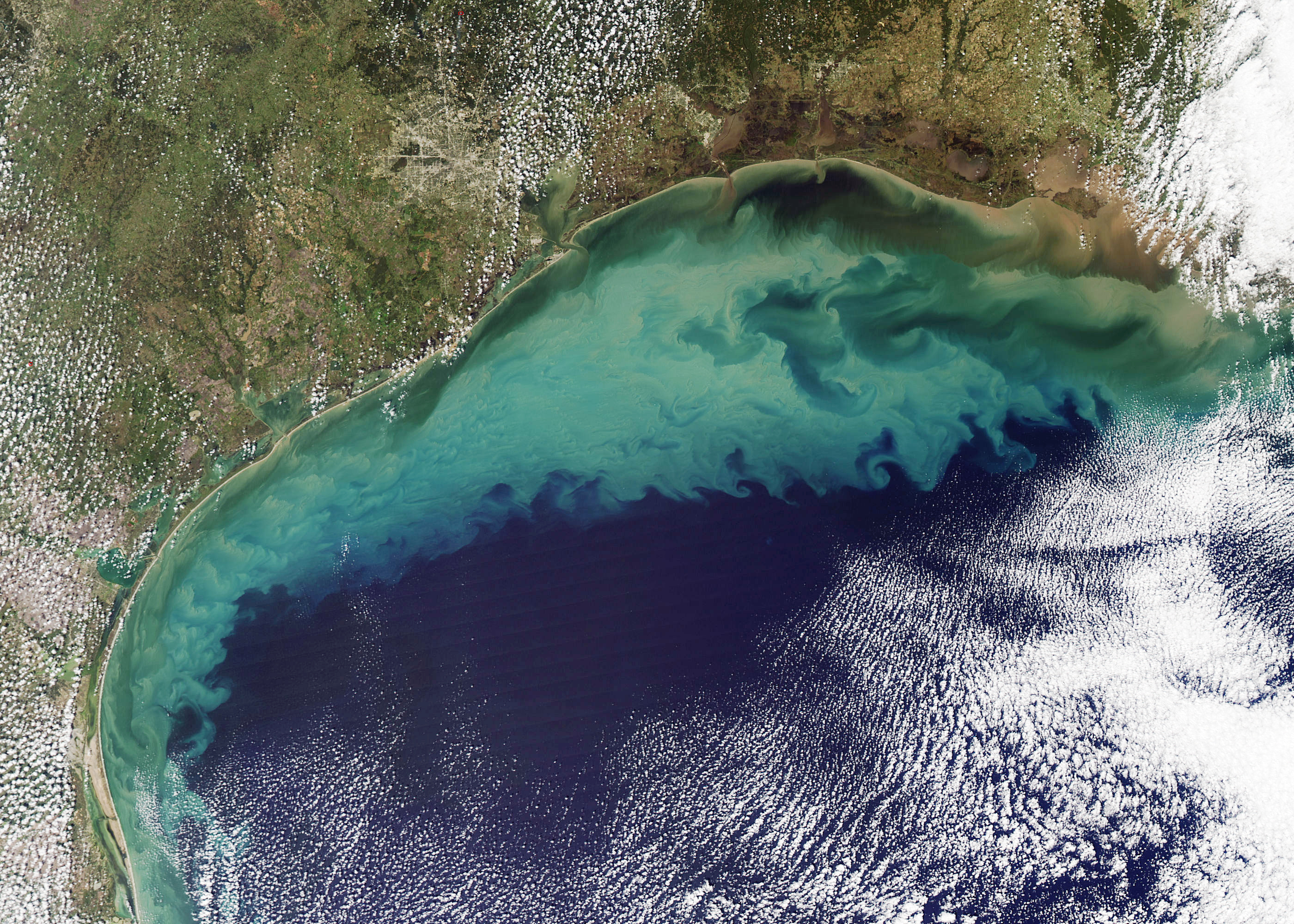
Benthic storms will often form nepheloid layers from the sediment they re-suspend. This one is located in the Gulf of Mexico.

They occur in areas with high sea-surface eddy kinetic energy (EKE). It also seems that they require a mixed barotropic–baroclinic instability-driven cyclogenesis to generate. A jet located near the surface developed meanders evolving into alternating and deep reaching cyclones and anticyclones. Simultaneously, the kinetic energy of high surface eddies increases near the bottom due to the convergence of vertical eddy pressure fluxes. They can then form bottom mixed layers that can have thicknesses of 100 meters, mainly from enhanced velocity shears and near-bottom turbulence production. Fluid particles are transported both laterally and vertically from the near bottom through the mixed bottom layer from deep cyclonic eddies. Varying intensities of deep current with distance from the bottom creates turbulence which leads to well-mixed layers. Deep varying transport particles from the near-bottom upward through the entire mixed layers.

Benthic storms seem to show a high range of variability in velocity, intensity, etc.

== History ==
In oceanography, it was a long held assumption that the water in the benthic boundary layer (BBL) located above the abyssal sea floor would be rather still. However it was revealed that the BBL was not static and instead different areas have dramatically different velocities. Benthic storms were first extensively studied along the continental rise of Nova Scotia and the Argentine Basin during the late 1970s and early 1980s with the High Energy Benthic Boundary Layer Experiment (commonly known as the HEBBLE program).

Despite a long history of observation, their mechanisms of formation and their relationship with deep ocean salient features such as bottom mixed layers (BMLs) and benthic nepheloid layers (BNLs) have been poorly understood.

== Importance ==
They are important for both the energy budget of the ocean and for sediment resuspension and transport. The particulate matter is suspends also scavenge adsorption-prone radionuclides. They are used as proxies for paleo-productivity and for the investigation of circulation in modern and paleo-oceans. Knowledge on how they are sourced, transported, and deposited will help to determine where scavenging is most likely to occur and to assess its impact on global biogeochemistry.
