= Filaments evaluation protocol =

3D printing methodology

The "filaments evaluation protocol" (FEP) is a protocol developed to establish the characteristics and qualities of materials used in FDM/FFF 3D printing.

== Purpose ==
The protocol, designed in 2014 by Dogma Solutions, is not applied to measure the properties of materials, but is instead designed to determine their suitability for specific uses and applications.

For this reason, the evaluations performed during the test do not provide quantitative outputs, but rather indicate, for each tested parameter, a degree of judgment on a unipolar odd Likert scale (now known as "Degree of Likert Rating" or "DLR"):

1. Strongly discouraged / highly unfit / very difficult to use / test totally failed
2. Discouraged / unsuitable / difficult to use / test partially failed
3. Neither recommended nor discouraged. There are not particular defects nor significant points in favor. The test is successful but the result is not convincing or either qualitatively relevant.
4. Recommended / suitable / easy to use / tested successfully within realistic expectations
5. Strongly recommended / highly suitable / easy to use / test perfectly succeeded up to the best (or even over) expectations
