= Hummocky cross-stratification =

Sedimentary structure found in sandstones

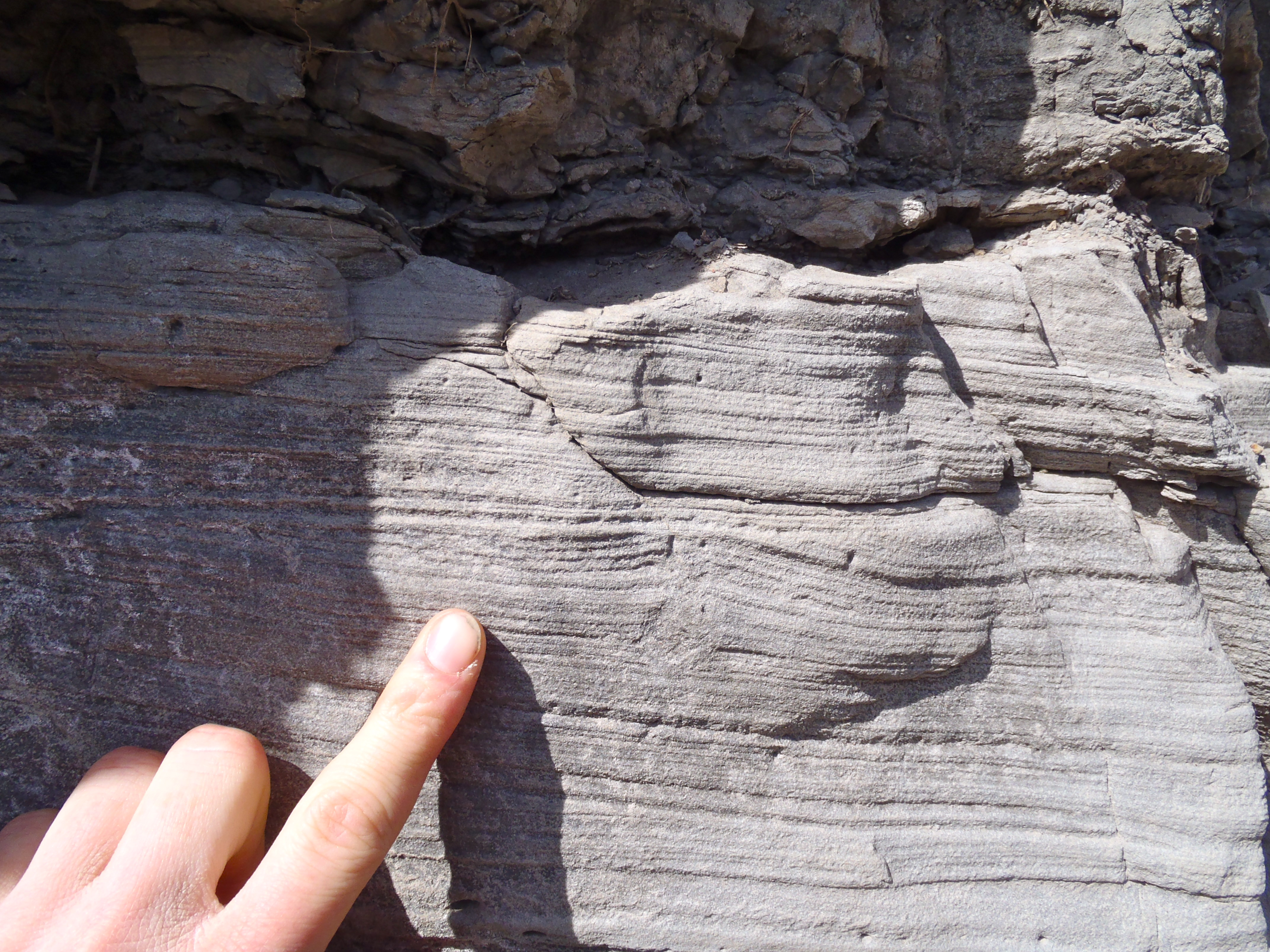
Hummocky cross-stratification from the Book Cliffs, Grand Junction, Colorado.

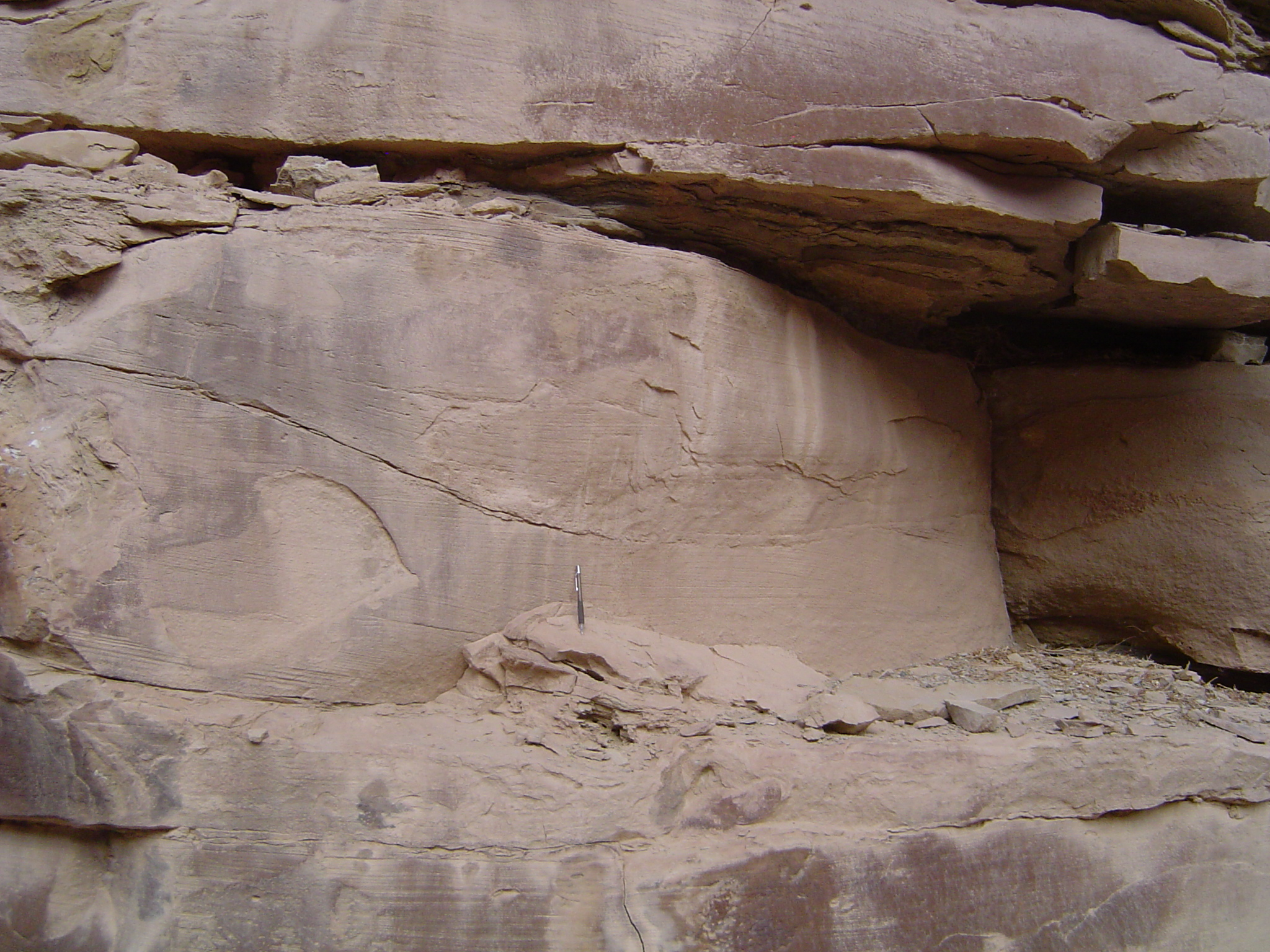
Hummocky cross-stratification from the Book Cliffs, Utah.

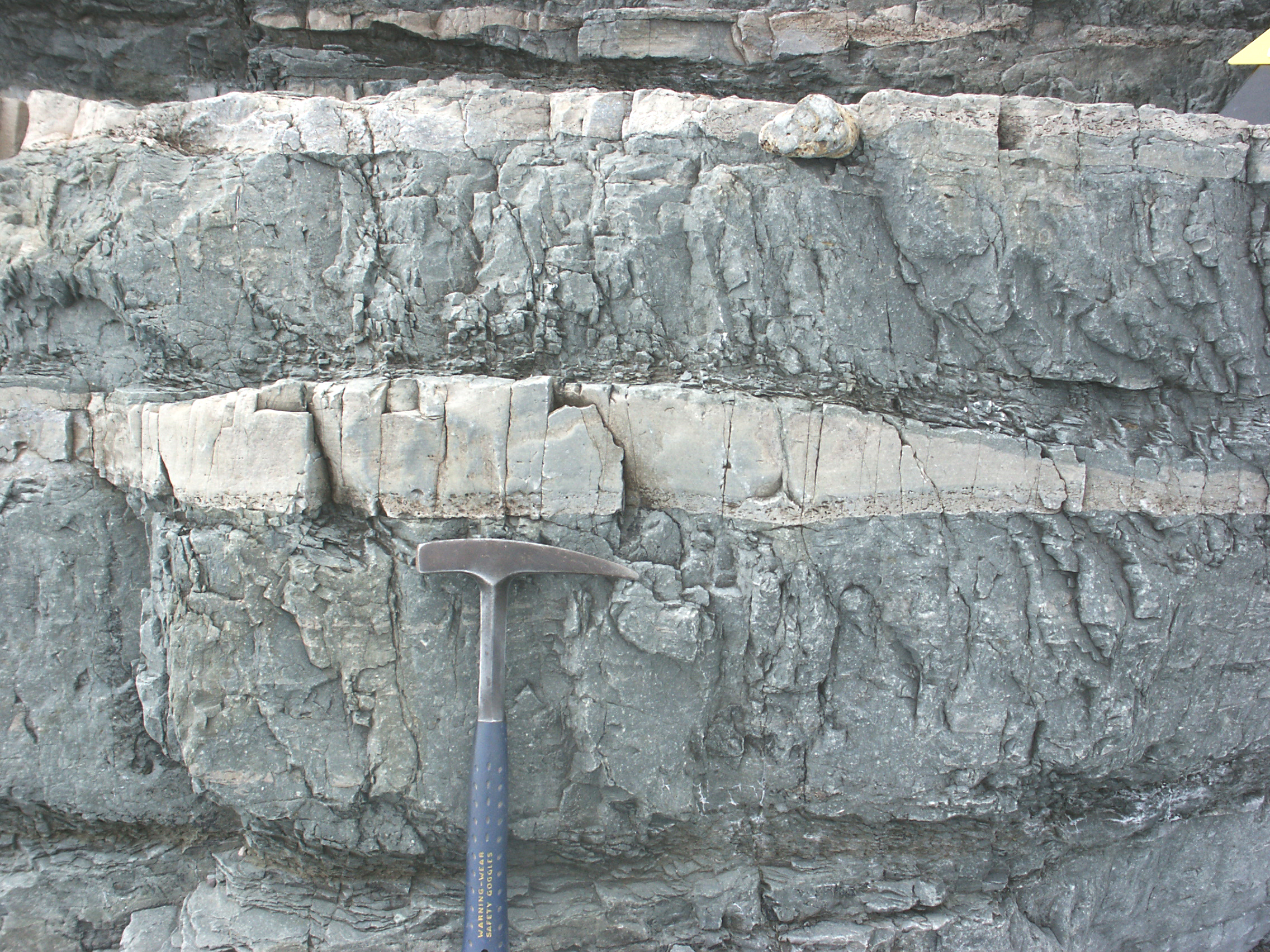
Hummocky cross-stratification from the Arisag Formation (Silurian), Nova Scotia.

Hummocky cross-stratification is a type of sedimentary structure found in sandstones. It is a form of cross-bedding usually formed by the action of large storms, such as hurricanes. It takes the form of a series of "smile"-like shapes, crosscutting each other. It is only formed at a depth of water below fair-weather wave base and above storm-weather wave base. They are not related to "hummocks" except in shape.

== History ==
The name was introduced by Harms et al. in 1975. Before this time, these structures were recognized under many different names. When hummocky cross-stratification was founded, it was originally given the name "truncated wave-ripple laminae", by Campbell (1966, 1971). The main features were listed by Bourgeois (1980), Harms et al. (1982), and Walker (1983), in order to identify the structure. Dott and Bourgeois launched an idealized hummocky stratification sequence. From bottom to top, these include: first-order scoured base (± sole marks); characteristic hummocky zone with several second-order truncation surfaces separating individual undulating lamina sets; a zone of flat laminae; a zone with well-oriented ripple cross-laminae and symmetrical ripple forms; all overlain by a more or less burrowed mudstone or siltstone. Walker (1983) wanted to create a second sequence, but it was decided that this sequence offers the best basis for studying hummocky cross-stratification for the future.

== Composition ==
This structure is commonly found in silt to fine sand. It is typically interbedded with bioturbated mudstone. It commonly contains concretions of abundant mica and plant detritus in the tops of many laminae. This helps indicate a shape sorting. Although hummocky cross-stratification is usually found in shallow marine sedimentary rocks, it has also been found in some lacustrine sedimentary rocks.

== Common characteristics ==
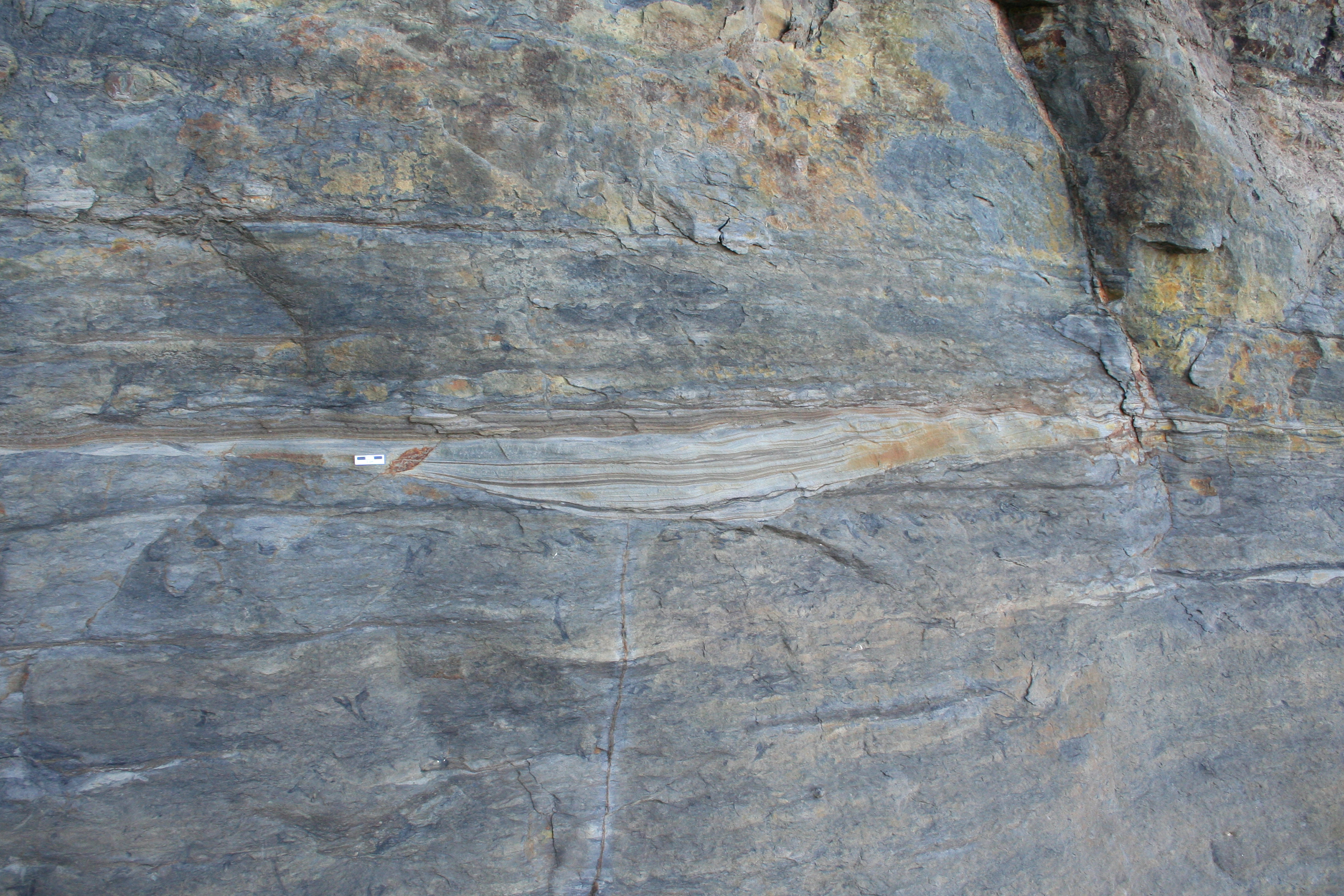
Isolated sandy swale within bioturbated mudrocks of the Pebbley Beach Formation (Permian), New South Wales.

In plan view (seen from above), it takes on the form of hummocks and swales that are circular to elliptical, with long wavelengths (1–5 m) but with low height (tens of centimeters). Laminations drape these hummocks; in cross-section view, these laminations have an upward curvature, and low angle, curved intersections. Hummocky cross-stratification can form in sediments up to about 3 cm in diameter, with near-bed water particle velocities between about 40–100 cm/s.

== Formation of structure ==
This structure is formed under a combination of unidirectional and oscillatory flow that is generated by relatively large storm waves in the ocean. Deposition involves fallout from suspension and lateral tractive flow due to wave oscillation. As the large waves drape sand over an irregular scoured surface, this strong storm-wave action erodes the seabed into low hummocks and swales that lack any significant orientation. It is usually formed by redeposition below normal fair weather wave base delivered offshore by flooding rivers and shoals by large waves.

== Depositional environments ==
During ancient times, hummocky cross-stratification was located in shallow marine environments, on the shore face and shelf by waves. It can also form on land during especially large storms when large amounts of water are pushed up onto the tidal flat. These landward deposits feature smaller bed forms due to the attenuation of storm waves as they move onto the land. While it is usually formed in marine settings by the action of storms (e.g.hurricane) it may also be deposited in fluvial strata; a fluvial origin is more likely if the unit solely comprises sand.

== See also ==
- Wave base
- Sedimentary structures
