= Foreign Education Providers Bill, 2013 =

Indian government bill

- Status: Pending

Foreign education provider (FEP's India) is the initiative of the Government of India to allow the foreign universities set up their educational campus (colleges and universities) in India. The foreign institutions must have to clear certain parameters financially and academically, before they can establish education in India. There are precisely many standards and norms that have been set for Foreign education providers in India (FEP's), by the Government of India. Amongst the various norms for foreign institutes eyeing Indian campuses, the primary norm is that they must first have to form a company under the companies act, 1956. Also, foreign education providers (FEP's) would have to maintain an asset of not less than Rs 25 Crores for each campus they establish. The FEPs that have been in the field of education for more than 20 years in the parent country would be allowed to set up campus in India. The Bill, if passed, would help students get access to education provided by overseas universities. Currently, 3.78% of country's GDP is utilized for expenses in the education sector. Education is a cooperative responsibility of both the Government of India and states.
