= FEP Sports =

Manufacturer of paintball equipment

FEP Sports, Inc.
- Company type: Incorporation
- Industry: Paintball
- Headquarters: Santa Barbara, CA, United States
- Key people: Dave Palmer; Erik Ginorio; Andy DuBuc
- Website: www.FEPsports.com

FEP Sports, formally known as First Endeavor Paintball or FEP, is a developer and manufacturer of paintball markers and other equipment located in Oxnard, CA. FEP is best known for their flagship Quest marker and associated upgrades. The company was created in 2004 and has existed as medium-sized entity since that time with the intention of supporting a limited array of products and services. The company was disbanded in 2007, but later resurrected under new staff in 2009. As of 2009, FEP Sports is currently involved in an internal restructuring to accompany their development phase related to their new upcoming products.

== Products ==
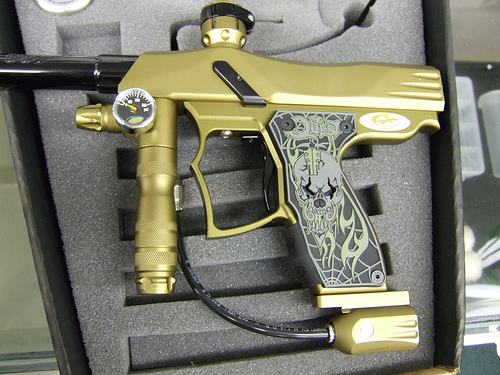
Quest marker

FEP is a medium-sized manufacturer of paintball products, thus most FEP products are geared for a specific market. The Quest paintball marker is FEP's main product and has been the basis for the company. The Quest marker was designed to compete with similar markers of the era, including the Dye DM4, Smart Parts Shocker SFT, and others. Quest markers originally sold for $925 (factory direct) but the price was reduced to $700 as the marker gained popularity over the next few months.

To support the Quest, FEP also sold a line of upgrade accessories. Examples of these items include a locking feedneck, adjustable bottomline rail, replacement bolts (also featuring upgraded performance), and assorted factory replacement parts such as ASA mounts and grip panels. FEP also produces a line of promotional "soft goods", including but not limited to T-shirts, hats, posters, and digital goods. FEP partnered with several industry distributors including National Paintball Supply (currently KEE Action Sports) in order to distribute their own products as well as offer a variety of popular generic accessories produced by other developers. These include loaders, tanks, and similar items required to play the game.

The entirety of the FEP product line was virtually discontinued in 2007 when the company disbanded. Some of the more popular items are said to be returning under the new 2009 lineup. Currently the main supporter of FEP products is California Paintball Supply who acquired the majority of closeout parts in order to support classic Quest markers in anticipation for the 09 product line.

== Dissolution and Reincorporation into FEP Sports ==
In 2007 FEP was in the process of redesigning the Quest marker into a newer model; the running name for this marker was "Q8". It was similar internally to the original Quests however featured some changes to the support systems (eye covers, frame layout, LPR, front reg mount, notably). This marker was slated for release in 2008 however it never became available due to the company disbanding shortly thereafter. Some proshops and stores located near to the FEP offices continued to support the Quest, largest of which being Critical Paintball.

The company leadership had parted ways, however many of them still wished to release the Q8 marker as their own. Dave Palmer, one of the original owners of the company, eventually reincorporated FEP into the new company FEP Sports in July 2009 with the intention of releasing a new product line similar to what had been envisioned. The new products centrally revolve around a new marker codenamed K1 which is tentatively scheduled for release in 2009.
