= Nepheloid layer =

Layer of water in deep sea

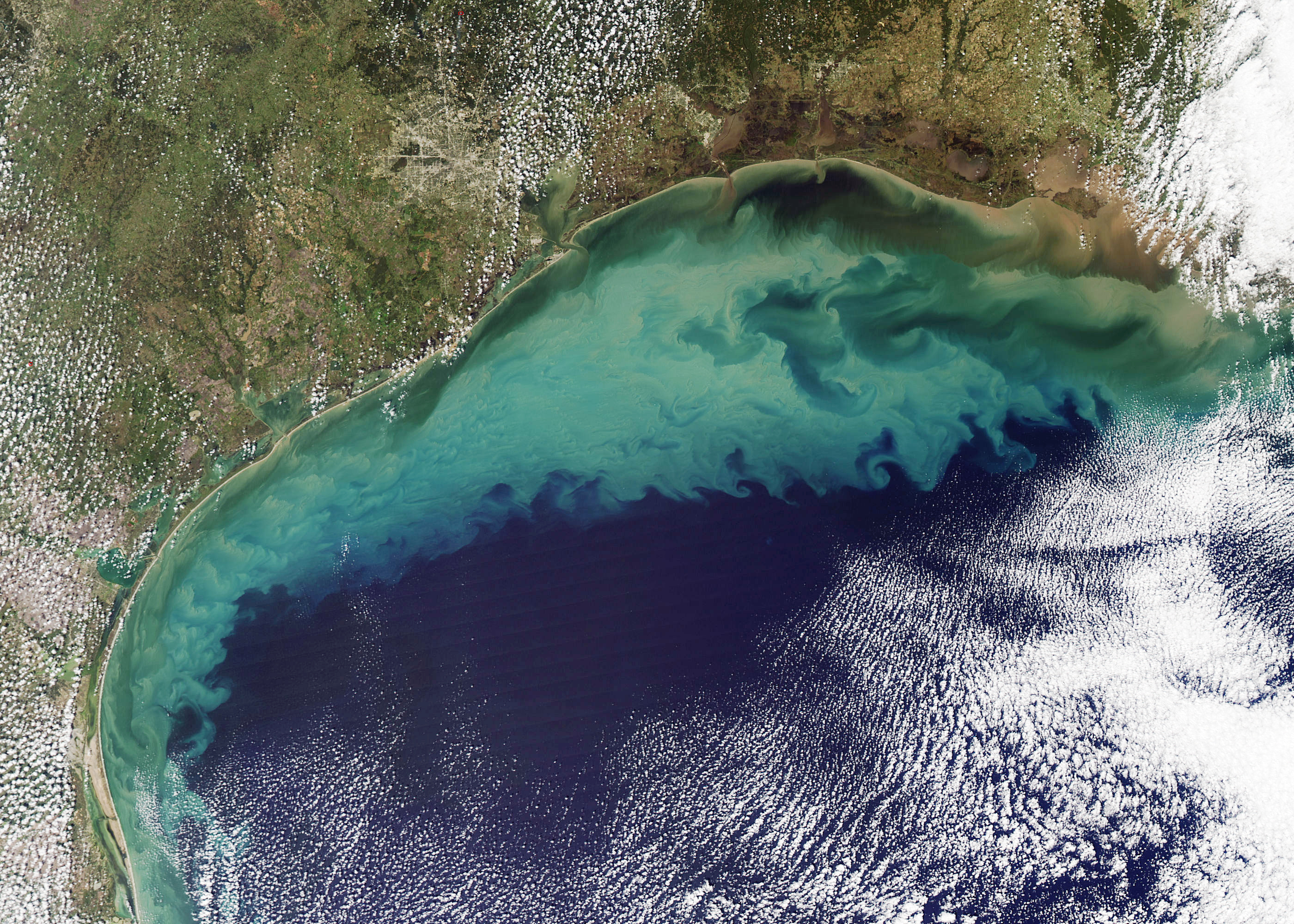
The Gulf of Mexico, which contains a significant nepheloid layer

A nepheloid layer or nepheloid zone is a layer of water in the deep sea basin, above the seabed, that contains significant amounts of suspended sediment. It is from 200 to 1000 m thick. The name comes from Greek: nephos, "cloud". The particles in the layer may come from the upper ocean layers and from stripping the sediments from the ocean floor by currents. Its thickness depends on bottom current velocity and is a result of a balance between gravitational settling of particles and turbulence of the current. The formation mechanisms of nepheloid layers may vary, but primarily depend on deep ocean convection. Nepheloid layers can impact the accuracy of instruments when measuring bathymetry as well as affect the types of marine life in an area. There are several significant examples of nepheloid layers across the globe, including within the Gulf of Mexico and the Porcupine Bank.

== Formation mechanisms ==
A surface nepheloid layer (SNL) may be created, due to particle flotation, while intermediate nepheloid layers (INL) may be formed at the slopes of the ocean bed due to the dynamics of internal waves. These intermediate nepheloid layers are derived from bottom nepheloid layers (BNL) after the layers become detached and spread along isopycnal surfaces.

Open ocean convection has a prominent effect on the distribution of nepheloid layers and their ability to form in certain areas of the ocean, such as the northern Atlantic Ocean and the northwestern Mediterranean Sea. Nepheloid layers are more likely to form based on patterns of deep ocean circulation that directly affect the abyssal plain. This is largely through the disruption of accumulated sediments in areas that deep ocean currents interact with. Convection currents that disturb areas of the ocean floor such as those that circulate via ocean gyres also affect the concentration and relative sizes of the suspended sediments, and by extension the area's corresponding biotic activity.

== Impacts ==
=== Bathymetry ===
The existence of the nepheloid layer complicates bathymetric measurements: one has to take into account the reflections of lidar or ultrasonic pulses from the upper interface of this layer, as well as their absorption within the layer. Interference from the thick layers of suspended sediments can ultimately produce inaccurate results concerning submarine topography.

=== Marine life ===
Depending on the characteristics of a particular nepheloid layer, it can have a significant impact on marine life in the area. The layers of sediments can block natural light, making it difficult for photosynthetic organisms to survive. In addition, the suspended particulates can harm filter feeding organisms and plankton by blocking their gills or weighing them down.

== Examples ==
=== Gulf of Mexico ===
A prominent nepheloid layer exists in the Gulf of Mexico extending from the delta of the Brazos River to South Padre Island. The layer of turbid water can begin as shallow as 20 meters and is caused mostly by clay run-off from multiple rivers. The silty bottom of the gulf also contributes to the high turbidity. Due to the blockage of light by this nepheloid layer, algae and coral are sparse, resulting in an animal-dominated community. This community is largely composed of infauna and consists of a detrital-based food chain. Many species of polychaete worms, amphipods, and brittle stars inhabit the benthic surface and can also be accompanied by some secondary consumers such as flounders, shrimp, crabs, and starfishes.

=== Porcupine Bank ===
A prominent nepheloid layer exists in the Porcupine Bank off the coast of Ireland. Geographically, the nepheloid layers are more detectable and prominent along the Porcupine Bank's western slope. Both the bottom and intermediate nepheloid layers form due to a myriad of factors such as internal tides, waves, and subsequent bottom erosion. The intermediate nepheloid layer can also manifest by breaking off from the bottom layer, and the water column above the area in which the bottom nepheloid layer forms is marked by significant differences in temperature, density, and salinity.
