= Wave base =

Maximum depth at which a water wave's passage causes significant water motion

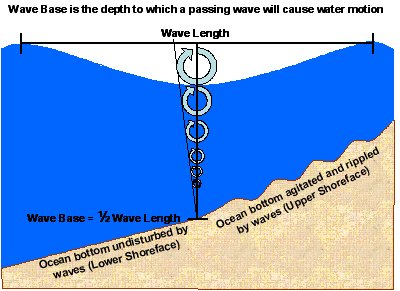
Wave base diagram.

The wave base, in physical oceanography, is the maximum depth at which a water wave's passage causes significant water motion. At water depths deeper than the wave base, bottom sediments and the seafloor are no longer stirred by the wave motion above.

== Process ==
In seawater, the water particles are moved in a circular orbital motion when a wave passes. The radius of the circle of motion for any given water molecule decreases exponentially with increasing depth. The wave base, which is the depth of influence of a water wave, is about half the wavelength.

At depths greater than half the wavelength, the amplitude of water motion is less than e^{−π} ≈ 4% of its value at the water surface and may be neglected.

For example, in a pool of water 1 metre (3.3 ft) deep, a wave with a 3 metres (9.8 ft) wavelength would be moving the water at the bottom. In the same pool, a wave with a wavelength of 0.5 metres (1.6 ft) would not be able to cause water movement on the bottom.

== Distinctions ==
It can be seen that the wave base is determined by deep water wave length which is a function of wave period. There are typically two significant wave bases, the fair weather wave base (FWWB) and the storm wave base (SWB).

=== Fair weather wave base ===
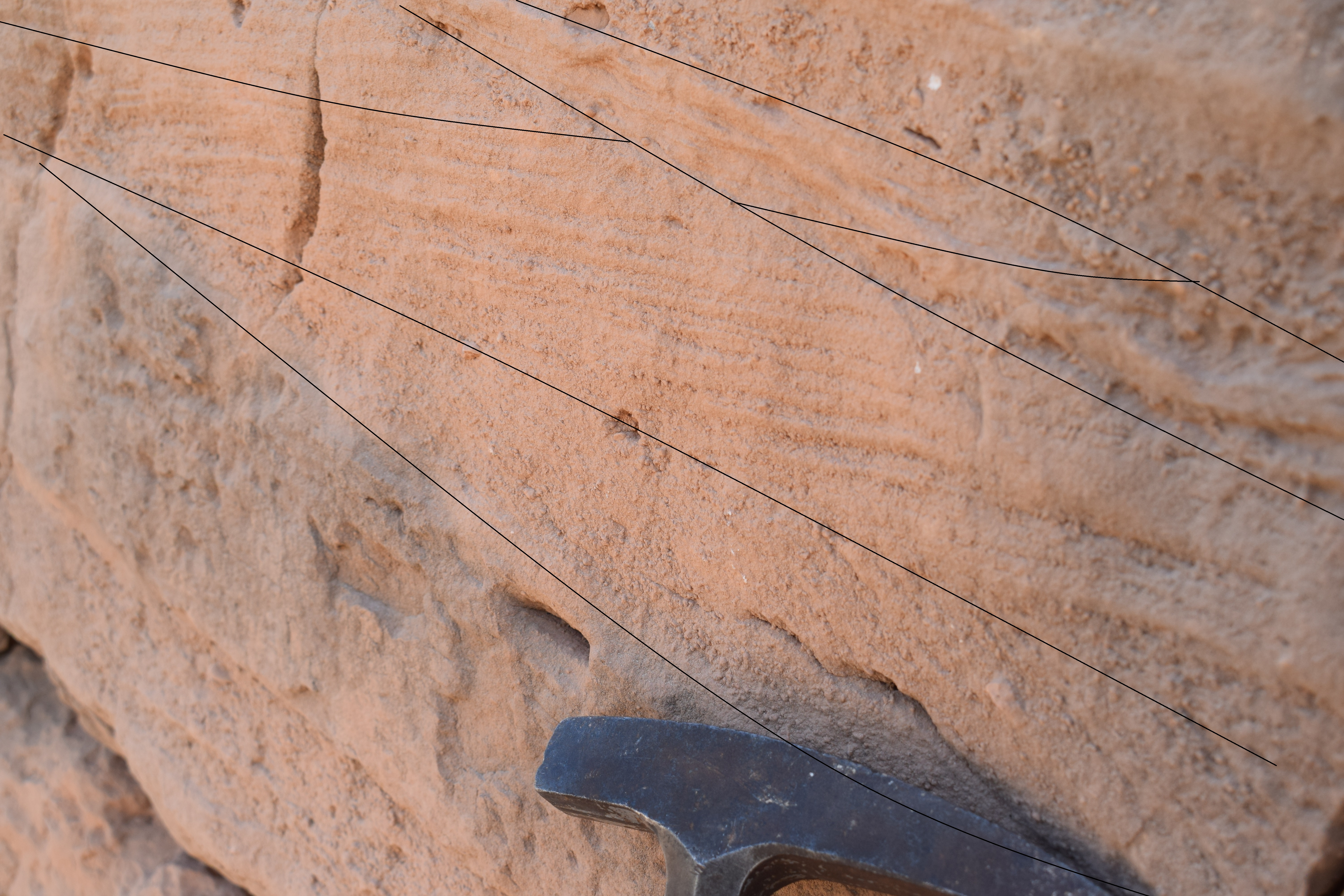
Cross-bedded upper shoreface sandstones

The FWWB is the depth beneath the waves under normal conditions and the portion of the seafloor that is agitated by this everyday wave action, known as the upper shoreface. The continuous agitation of the sea floor in the upper shoreface environment results in sediments that are winnowed of the smallest grains, leaving only those grains heavy enough that the water cannot keep them suspended.

=== Storm wave base ===
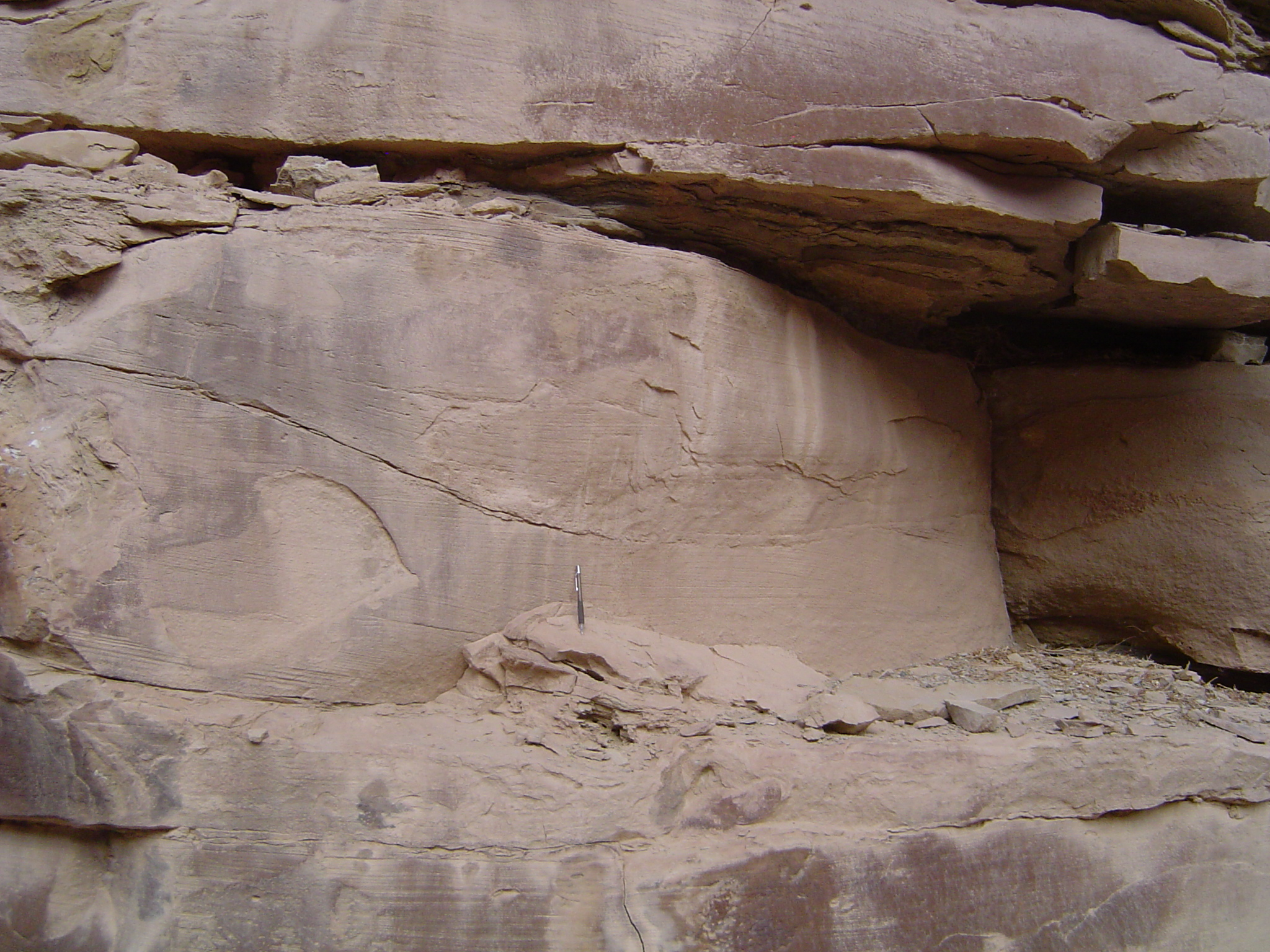
Hummocky cross-stratification sandstone sedimentary structure, Cretaceous era Book Cliffs formation, Utah.

The SWB is the depths beneath storm-driven waves and can be much deeper than the FWWB. The portion of the seafloor that is only agitated by storm-driven wave action is known as the lower shoreface. Between storms, finer grained sediments accumulate on the seafloor, but during storms those sediments get suspended and moved around, resulting in a sedimentary structure form described as hummocky cross-stratification.

=== Other classifications ===
Note that another classification exists, which considers that the zone affected by both fair weather and storm waves is to be defined as shoreface, whereas Upper offshore is the name given to the zone only affected by storm waves and Lower offshore a zone not disturbed by any surface wave. (e.g.)

== See also ==
- Lower shoreface – Part of the seafloor undisturbed by waves — below fair weather wave base
- Airy wave theory – Fluid dynamics theory on gravity waves
- Dispersion (water waves) – Dispersion of waves on a water surface
- Waves and shallow water – Effect of shallow water on a surface gravity wave
- Sedimentary structures – Geologic structures formed during sediment deposition
