= Dibble (surname) =

Dibble is an English surname, derived from a diminutive of the medieval given name Theobald. Notable people with the name include:

- Adam Dibble (born 1991), English cricketer
- Andy Dibble (born 1965), Welsh footballer and coach
- C. W. Dibble (1876–1948), American football player and coach
- Charles E. Dibble (1909–2002), American anthropologist and linguist
- Chris Dibble (born 1960), English footballer
- Christian Dibble (born 1994), Welsh footballer
- Clark B. Dibble (1860–1932), American politician
- Dorne Dibble (1929–2018), American football player
- Eugene Dibble (1893–1968), American physician
- Flint Dibble, American archaeologist and science communicator
- Fran Dibble (born 1962), New Zealand artist, writer and art critic
- George S. Dibble (1904–1992), American painter, academic, art critic
- Harold L. Dibble (1951–2018), American Paleolithic archaeologist
- James Dibble (1923–2010), Australian television newsreader
- Jeremy Dibble (born 1958), English musicologist
- Jodie Dibble (born 1994), English cricketer
- John Dibble (1634–c.1707), English Whig politician
- L. Grace Dibble (1902–1998), British teacher and writer
- Nicolás Dibble (born 1994), Uruguayan footballer
- Paul Dibble (1943–2023), New Zealand sculptor
- Philo Dibble (1951–2011), American diplomat
- Rob Dibble (born 1964), American baseball player
- Robert Dibble (1882–1963), English international rugby union player
- Samuel Dibble (1837–1913), American politician
- Scott Dibble (singer-songwriter), Canadian singer-songwriter, recording artist and producer
- Scott Dibble (politician) (born 1965), American politician
- Sheldon Dibble (1809–1845), American historian
- Warren Dibble (1930–2014), New Zealand poet and playwright

== Fictional characters ==
- Officer Charlie Dibble, a fictional character in the cartoon series Top Cat

== See also ==
- Dibble (disambiguation)
- Judy Dyble (1949–2020), English singer-songwriter
