= Dibble =

Dibble may refer to:

- Dibble, a planting tool also known as a Dibber
- Dibble (surname), a list of people with the name
- Dibble, Oklahoma, a town in McClain County, Oklahoma, United States
- British Police, a common nickname for members of the British Police Force that originated in Manchester

In Antarctica:

- Dibble Bluff, a rock bluff
- Dibble Glacier, a channel glacier
  - Dibble Basin, an underwater basin
  - Dibble Glacier Tongue
  - Dibble Iceberg Tongue
- Dibble Peak
