= Anton Island =

Island in Antarctica

- Location within Antarctica

Geography
- Location: Antarctica
- Coordinates: 66°2′S 134°28′E

Administration
- Administered under the Antarctic Treaty System

Demographics
- Population: Uninhabited

Anton Island is a low ice-capped island about 1 kilometre (0.5 nmi) long. It lies 9 kilometres (5 nmi) north-northeast of Lewis Island, just outside the east side of the entrance to Davis Bay. It was discovered in 1956 from the MV Kista Dan by an Australian National Antarctic Research Expedition led by Phillip Law that landed on the island on 18 January 1960, and was named by the Antarctic Names Committee of Australia for Anton Moyell, first officer on the MV Magga Dan in 1960.

== See also ==
- List of antarctic and sub-antarctic islands
