= Lewis Island =

Lewis Island may refer to:

== Canada ==
- Lewis Island (British Columbia), an island near the mouth of the Skeena River on the North Coast of British Columbia
- Crease Island, British Columbia, was formerly known as Lewis Island
- Lewis Island (Nova Scotia), an island in Inverness County, Nova Scotia
- Lewis Island (Algoma), an island in the Algoma District of Ontario
- Lewis Island (Leeds County), an island in Leeds County, Ontario
- Lewis Island (Manitoba), an island in Manitoba
- Lewis Islands, Newfoundland and Labrador, in the Terra Nova Peninsula region
- Lewis Island (Newfoundland and Labrador), one of four islands in that province
- Lewis Island Tickle, a channel in Newfoundland and Labrador

== United States ==
- Lewis Island (Connecticut), off the shore of the state of Connecticut
- Lewis Island (Georgia)

== Elsewhere ==
- Lewis Island (Antarctica)
- Lewis Island (South Australia)
- West Lewis Island (Dampier Archipelago, Western Australia)
- East Lewis Island (Dampier Archipelago, Western Australia)
- Isle of Lewis, a peninsula in the Outer Hebrides, Scotland
- Lewis and Harris, Outer Hebrides, the largest island in Scotland

== See also ==
- Lewis's Island, more commonly known as Motungārara Island / Fishermans Island, an island in New Zealand
