= Dibble Glacier Tongue =

Glacier tongue in Antarctica

Dibble Glacier Tongue (65°50′S 135°0′E) is a large glacier tongue extending seaward from Dibble Glacier in Wilkes Land, Antarctica. The seaward end of the glacier tongue is named Dibble Iceberg Tongue. It was delineated from air photos taken by U.S. Navy Operation Highjump (1946–47), and was named by the Advisory Committee on Antarctic Names for Jonas Dibble and the unsung crew members of the United States Exploring Expedition squadron under Lieutenant Charles Wilkes, 1838–42.
