= Ghost of the Huia =

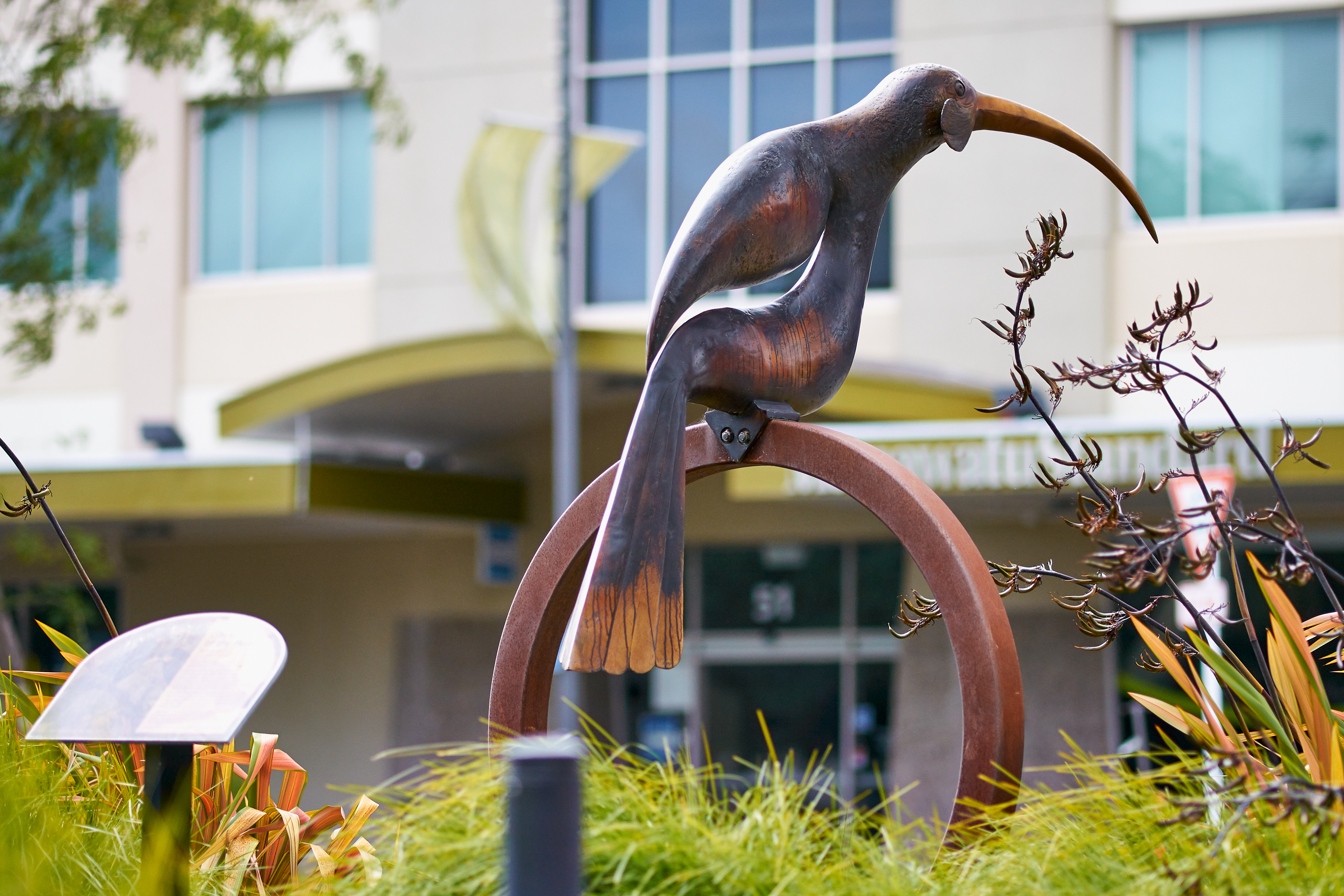
- Interactive map of Ghost of the Huia
- Location: Palmerston North, New Zealand
- Coordinates: 40°21′27″S 175°36′39″E
- Designer: Paul Dibble
- Material: Bronze and steel
- Opening date: 2010

Ghost of the Huia is a bronze and steel sculpture of a female huia by Paul Dibble located in Palmerston North, New Zealand. It is currently located at the southwest corner of The Square, near the intersection with Church Street.

The sculpture consists of a bronze huia sitting on a rusted corten steel ring. It was presented to the city of Palmerston North in September 2011. The huia was hunted to extinction, and its last sighting was in the nearby Tararua Range in 1907. According to Dibble, the sculpture is a statement that "if you want things of beauty, you have to be prepared to look after them."
