= Cape Cesney =

Cape in Antarctica

Cape Cesney (66°6′S 133°54′E) is a broad ice-covered cape marking the west side of the entrance to Davis Bay in Antarctica. It was delineated from air photos taken by U.S. Navy Operation Highjump (1946–47), and named by the Advisory Committee on Antarctic Names for A.M. Cesney, master's mate on the Flying Fish of the United States Exploring Expedition (1838–1842) under Charles Wilkes.
