= Pacific Monarch (sculpture) =

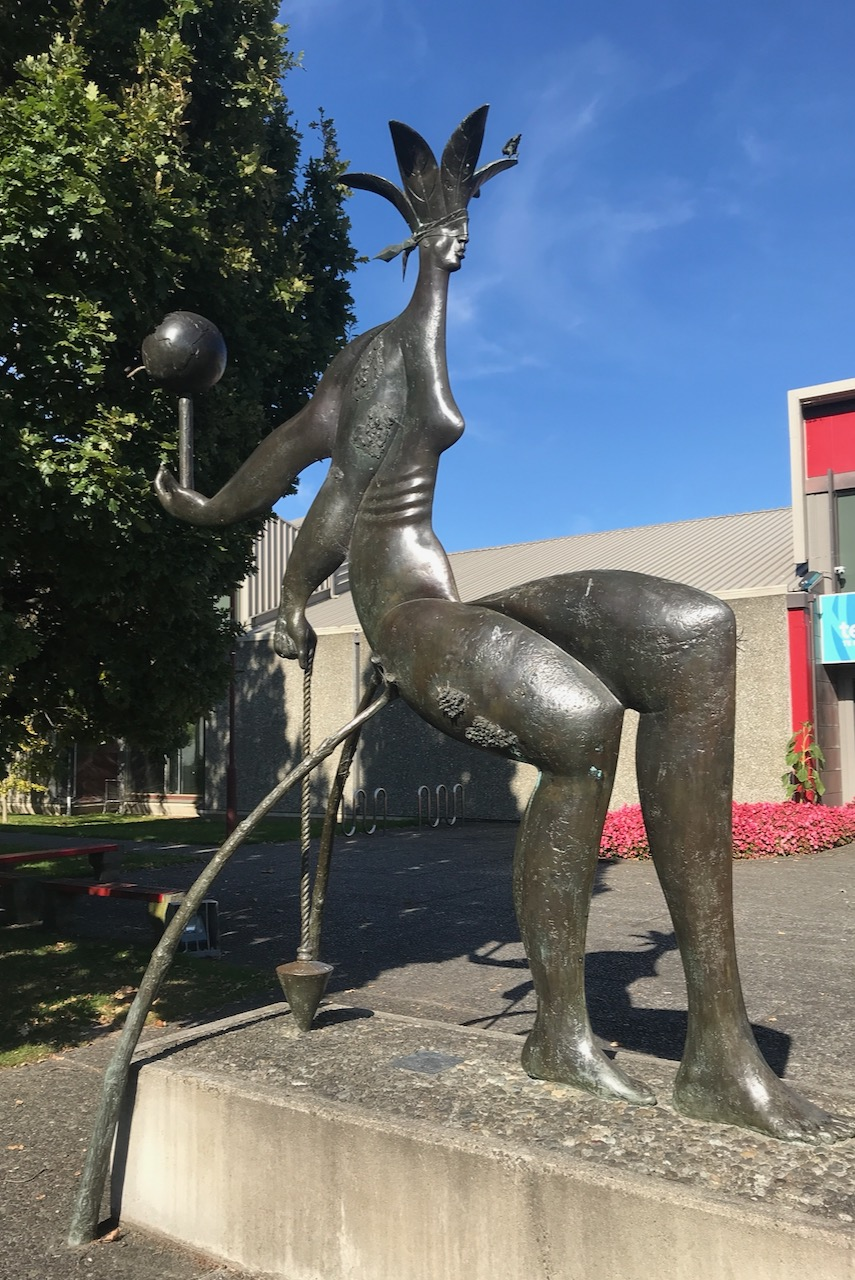
- Interactive map of Pacific Monarch
- Location: Palmerston North, New Zealand
- Coordinates: 40°21′27″S 175°36′31″E
- Designer: Paul Dibble
- Material: Bronze
- Opening date: 1992

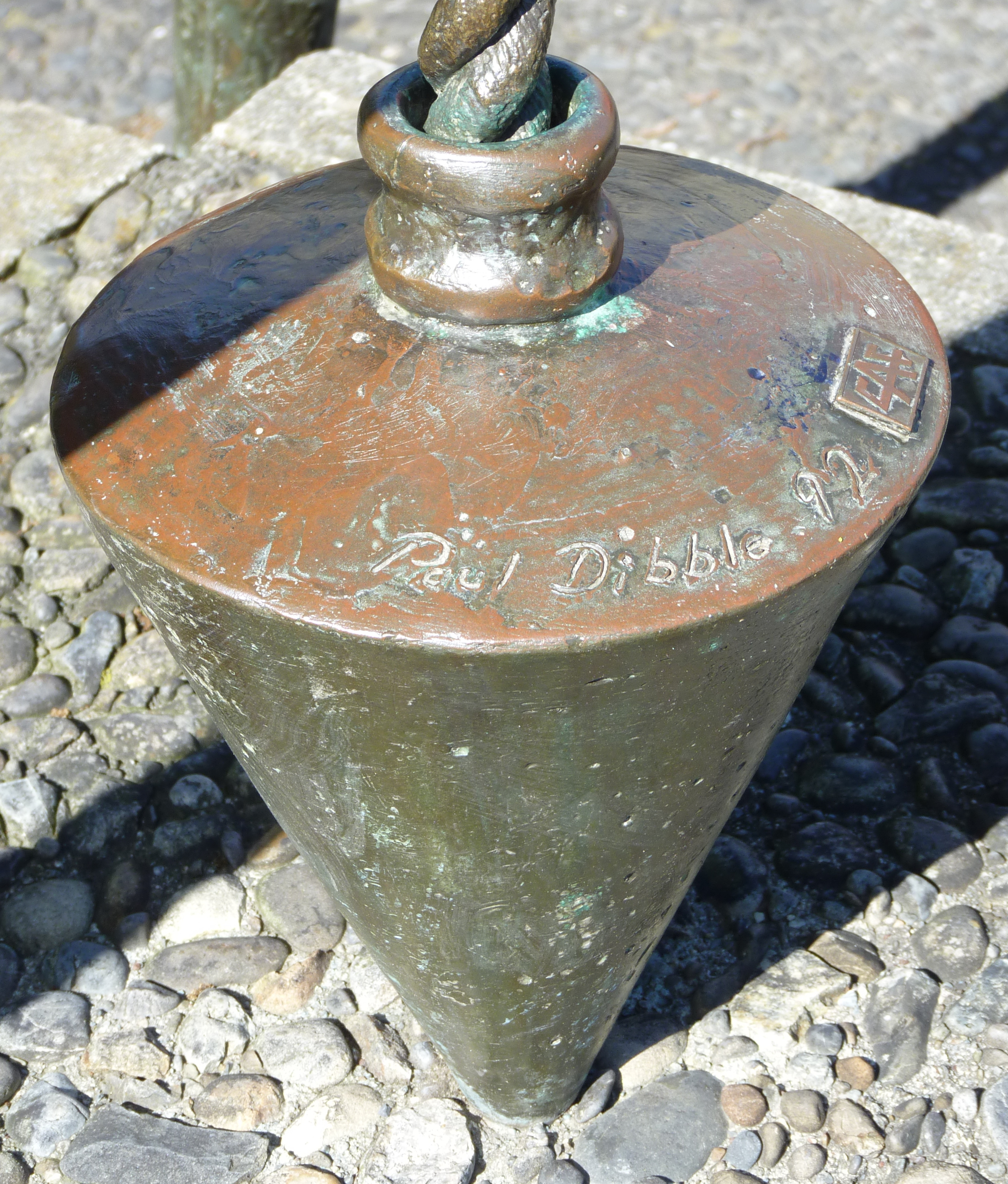
Plumb bob on "Pacific Monarch", showing the artist's signature

Pacific Monarch is an abstract bronze sculpture by Paul Dibble located outside Te Manawa in Palmerston North, New Zealand.

The sculpture was commissioned by the then-Manawatu Art Gallery and funded by a bequest from the estate of Gertrude Raikes. Dibble's initial proposal was rejected, but he was given the commission after negotiations with the selected artist failed. The sculpture was installed outside the art gallery in December 1992. The construction of the sculpture was documented in a documentary film, "Intent to Construct".

The abstract figure symbolises the settlement of Palmerston North. It is blindfolded, with barnacles on the underside of its legs (symbolising the long sea voyage) and bees and honeycomb on its torso. In its hands it holds a plumb bob (symbolising intent to settle) and a globe (symbolising their voyage).
