= Lewis Island (Antarctica) =

Island in Antarctica

- Location within Antarctica

Geography
- Location: Antarctica
- Coordinates: 66°6′S 134°22′E
- Highest elevation: 30 m (100 ft)

Administration
- Administered under the Antarctic Treaty System

Demographics
- Population: Uninhabited

Lewis Island is a small rocky island rising to 30 metres (100 ft), marking the east side of the entrance to Davis Bay in Antarctica, with Anton Island 5 nmi to the south south-west. It was delineated from air photos taken by U.S. Navy Operation Highjump (1946–47) and named by the Advisory Committee on Antarctic Names for James B. Lewis, Passed Midshipman on the sloop Peacock of the U.S. Exploring Expedition (1838–42) under Charles Wilkes.

== See also ==
- Lewis Island (disambiguation)
