= Dibble Iceberg Tongue =

Glacier in Antarctica

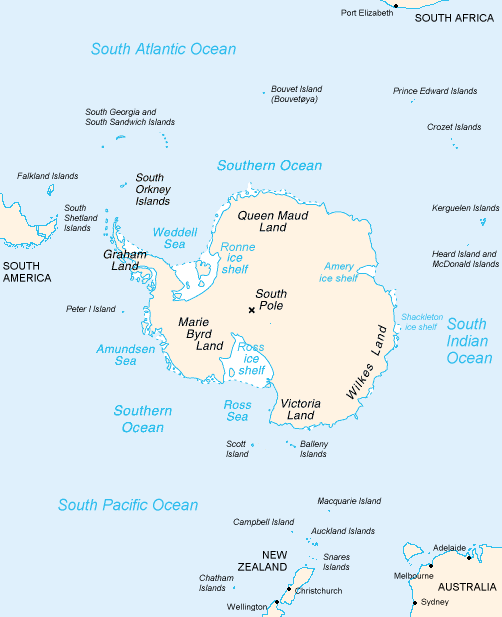
- Map of Antarctica, with Wilkes Land slightly to the right

- Location within Antarctica
- Location: Wilkes Land
- Coordinates: 65°30′00″S 135°00′00″E
- Thickness: unknown
- Terminus: Dibble Glacier Tongue
- Status: unknown

Dibble Iceberg Tongue (65°30′S 135°0′E) is an iceberg tongue at the seaward end of Dibble Glacier Tongue. The names Dibble Glacier and Dibble Glacier Tongue were applied by the Advisory Committee on Antarctic Names (US-ACAN) in 1955, concurrent with Gardner Dean Blodgett's delineation of the features from aerial photographs taken by U.S. Navy Operation Highjump (1946–47). The offshore segment of these two related features was photographed by the Australian National Antarctic Research Expeditions in 1956 and 1959, and the Antarctic Names Committee of Australia subsequently recommended that it be named Dibble Iceberg Tongue. US-ACAN has approved the latter name only for the portion lying seaward of Dibble Glacier Tongue.

== See also ==
- List of glaciers in the Antarctic
- Glaciology
