= L. Grace Dibble =

British teacher and writer (1902–1998)

(Lucy) Grace Dibble (1902-1998) was a British teacher, traveller and travel writer. She wrote as L. Grace Dibble.

== Life ==
Lucy Grace Dibble was born on 3 October 1902 in Basingstoke. The family moved to Kent when she was a child, eventually moving to a house in Bearsted, Mount Pleasant, that had earlier belonged to the cricketer Alfred Mynn. She was educated at Maidstone Grammar School for Girls before training as a teacher at Homerton College, Cambridge. She gained a University of Cambridge Diploma in Geography, followed by an honours degree in geography from the University of London.

Dibble taught in Winnipeg, Canada, Poona, India and in various colleges in Nigeria as well as at Dane Court Technical High School for Girls in Broadstairs, Kent. Upon retirement in Broadstairs Kent, she embarked upon a new career as a travel writer.

She died on 3 September 1998.

== Works ==
- Return tickets, 1968
- Return tickets to Scandinavia, 1982
- Return tickets to Yugoslavia, 1984
- Return tickets here and there, 1988
- No return tickets!, 1989
- Return tickets to Africa, 1992
- Return tickets in pictures for armchair globetrotters, 1996
- Return tickets to sacred places, 1996
