= Lewis Island (Georgia) =

Island in McIntosh County, Georgia, United States

Coordinates: 31.38517°N 81.52094°W

Lewis Island is an island in the U.S. state of Georgia.

Lewis Island most likely has the name of an original owner of the site.
