= Fran Dibble =

New Zealand artist, writer and art critic (born 1962)

Frances Joan Dibble QSM (née McIntosh; born 1962) is a painter, sculptor, writer and art critic based in Palmerston North, New Zealand. In 2007, she was awarded the Queen's Service Medal.

== Biography ==
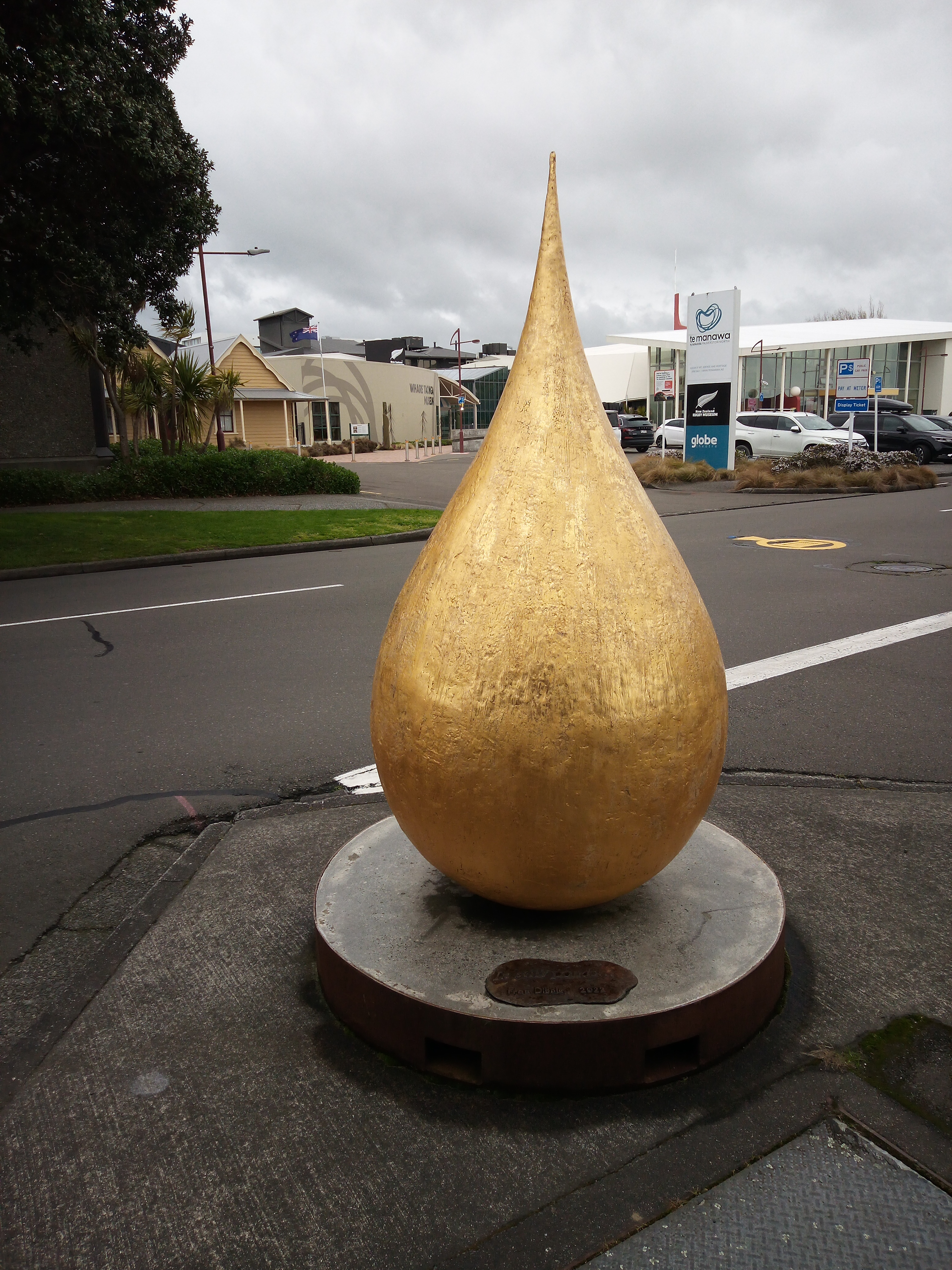
"In Still Ponds the Universe is Reflected" by Fran Dibble.

Dibble was born in New Haven, Connecticut, United States in 1962. She moved to New Zealand with her family when she was a teenager, moving to Palmerston North in 1975.

Dibble has a Bachelor of Science in Biochemistry and Botany, a Master of Science (Hons) in Biochemistry from Massey University, and a Bachelor of Arts in Philosophy.

Dibble's artistic practice encompasses, painting, and bronze-cast sculpting. Her art draws on inspiration from the natural world, including plants, sea shells and aquatic life. In 1985, Dibble established a small foundry with her husband, artist Paul Dibble. The Dibbles started with casting small-scale pieces, with larger pieces being sent to larger art foundries. In 2000, they opened a large foundry in an industrial part of Palmerston North, where they now cast all their works.

She has exhibited at Te Manawa and the Zimmerman Gallery in Palmerston North.

In 2007, Dibble was awarded a Queen's Service Medal for services to art, in particular sculpture.

In 2022 her sculpture In Still Ponds the Universe is Reflected was unveilled in Palmerston North.
