= Dibble Glacier =

Glacier of Antarctica

- Location within Antarctica
- Location: Wilkes Land
- Coordinates: 66°17′S 134°36′E
- Length: Dibble flow.png
- Thickness: unknown
- Terminus: Davis Bay
- Status: unknown

Dibble Glacier in Antarctica is a prominent channel glacier flowing from the continental ice and terminating in a prominent tongue at the east side of Davis Bay. Primarily directed to the east of the Dibble Basin, the ice flow is fast, showing recent loss of ~2.4 Gt/year with velocity fastest near the center of the glacier. Hence, the glacial terminus has drawn back over the years, showing significant retreat. The glacier connects to the Dibble Iceberg Tongue extending across the entire continental shelf, and holds ~12cm of sea-level equivalent.

Dibble glacier was delineated from air photos taken by U.S. Navy Operation Highjump (1946–47) and covers an area of ~36,500 km^{2}. It was named by the Advisory Committee on Antarctic Names for Jonas Dibble, ship's carpenter on the sloop Peacock of the United States Exploring Expedition (1838–42) under Charles Wilkes. Dibble is credited with leaving his sick bed and working 24 hours without relief with other carpenters to repair a broken rudder on the Peacock, when the ship was partially crushed in an ice bay in 151°19′E and forced to retire northward.

== Inner Continental Shelf ==
With a moderately deep seafloor of 200–600m and minimal or no cover of soft sediments, the inner continental shelf has steep, deeply incised channels which most likely resulted from subglacial meltwater. The large channels have sizes up to 250m deep and 600m wide with wave-like forms and an overall N-S orientation. Moreover, most of the channels are smaller, approximately 20–50m deep and 100–200m wide. These smaller channels are often joined to larger ones in an oblique fashion.

== Mid Shelf ==
A deep basin of approximately ~1000m depth, the mid shelf's southern edge is lined with a seabed that is rough and irregular. The channels intersecting this region go up to 450m in width and 50m in depth, and occasionally show drumlin characteristics. As one moves along to the north, the seafloor becomes smoother. The north-western part of the basin is covered with over 20m of sediment, while parts that are farther north highlight linear and parallel glacial features that are oriented in the North-South direction. These features are 5–15m high and 100–200m wide, and contain irregular spacing between them that varies in the range of 200–900m.

== Shelf Break ==
The shallow shelf break is approximately 300-400m in depth. It is incised by numerous gullies extending onto the continental slope. On parts of the outer shelf, furrows that are randomly-oriented could represent iceberg ploughmarks which are mainly found in deeper waters of 350–500m, with much fewer of these being observed in regions that were less than 300m deep. It is likely to have a hard seafloor that is absent of unconsolidated sediments. A series of gullies cuts into the shelf break, as well as the uppermost continental slopes, near the shelf edge. Because of the gullies, it has been suggested that during the period of the last glaciation, streaming and grounded ice reached the shelf break. The gullies have widening ridges between them and are 5–45 m deep, extending 790–3880m in length down the continental slope.

== Important Bird Area ==
A 500 ha site on fast ice about 5 km from the north-eastern margin of the glacier has been designated an Important Bird Area (IBA) by BirdLife International because it supports a breeding colony of emperor penguins, with an estimate of some 12,500 individuals based on 2009 satellite imagery.

== See also ==
- List of glaciers in the Antarctic
- Glaciology
