= Chris Dibble =

English footballer (born 1960)

Personal information
- Full name: Christopher Dibble
- Date of birth: 10 October 1960 (age 66)
- Place of birth: Morden, England
- Position: Midfielder

Senior career*
Years	Team	Apps	(Gls)
1977–1982	Millwall	63	(5)
1982–1984	Wimbledon	9	(0)
	Wealdstone	?	(?)
Total		72	(5)

International career
1976	England Schoolboys	3	(0)
- * Club domestic league appearances and goals

Christopher Dibble (born 10 October 1960) is an English former footballer who played as a midfielder in the Football League.
