= Paul Dibble =

New Zealand sculptor (1943–2023)

Paul Dibble MNZM
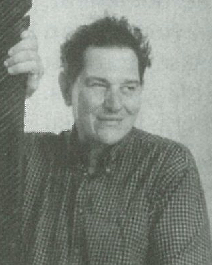
- Dibble in 2001
- Born: Paul Hugh Dibble; 20 March 1943; Thames, New Zealand
- Died: 5 December 2023 (aged 80); Palmerston North, New Zealand
- Education: Elam School of Fine Arts
- Known for: Sculpture
- Notable work: New Zealand War Memorial, London
- Spouse(s): Patricia Burke; Fran McIntosh
- Website: https://pauldibble.com/

Paul Hugh Dibble MNZM (20 March 1943 – 5 December 2023) was a New Zealand sculptor.

== Biography ==
Born in Thames on 20 March 1943 and raised on a farm in Waitakaruru on the Hauraki Plains, Dibble was educated at Thames High School. He trained at the Elam School of Fine Arts, University of Auckland from 1963, graduating with a Diploma of Fine Arts with Honours in 1967. He was one of the last group of Elam graduates to be trained traditionally with classes including modelling and life drawing.

Starting in 1965, Dibble collaborated with architect James Hackshaw and artist Colin McCahon on twelve projects to make works for Catholic churches in Auckland. He taught art at secondary schools during the 1970s, then was appointed to lecture on painting and sculpture at the Palmerston North College of Education in 1977. Between 1997 and 2002 Dibble lectured in art at Massey University. he produced a wide range of pieces and mounted many one-man exhibitions, beginning with the Barry Lett Gallery in Auckland in 1971. Dibble received grants from the QEII Arts Council in 1979 and 1985 and held a residency at the Dowse Art Museum in Lower Hutt in 1987–88. Dibble was based in Palmerston North, and in 2000 established his own bronze foundry at Cloverlea for larger works. He was one of a small number of New Zealand sculptors who do their own large-scale casting.

Dibble was appointed a Member of the New Zealand Order of Merit, for services to the arts, in the 2005 New Year Honours, and in 2007 he was awarded an honorary Doctor of Fine Arts degree by Massey University. He was made an honorary Fellow of the Universal College of Learning in Palmerston North in 2012.

Dibble worked in bronze. He referenced the apple in the Garden of Eden in several works, and other works referenced aspects of New Zealand's history such as Maui's fishhook, Captain Cook, sheep and farming. Native wildlife and plants, particularly huia and kōwhai, often featured in his work. Dibble's work is held in public collections in New Zealand, including that of the Museum of New Zealand Te Papa Tongarewa, the Dowse Art Museum, Te Manawa in Palmerston North, and the Christchurch Art Gallery.

In 2016, the Stuart Residence Halls Council gifted Dibble's sculpture Pathways to the University of Otago, to celebrate the council's 75th anniversary.

In May 2018 Dibble's sculpture The Garden 2002 was unveiled in Havelock North by Governor-General Dame Patsy Reddy.

Dibble died in Palmerston North on 5 December 2023, at the age of 80.

== Notable commissions ==
- New Zealand War Memorial, London

== Gallery ==
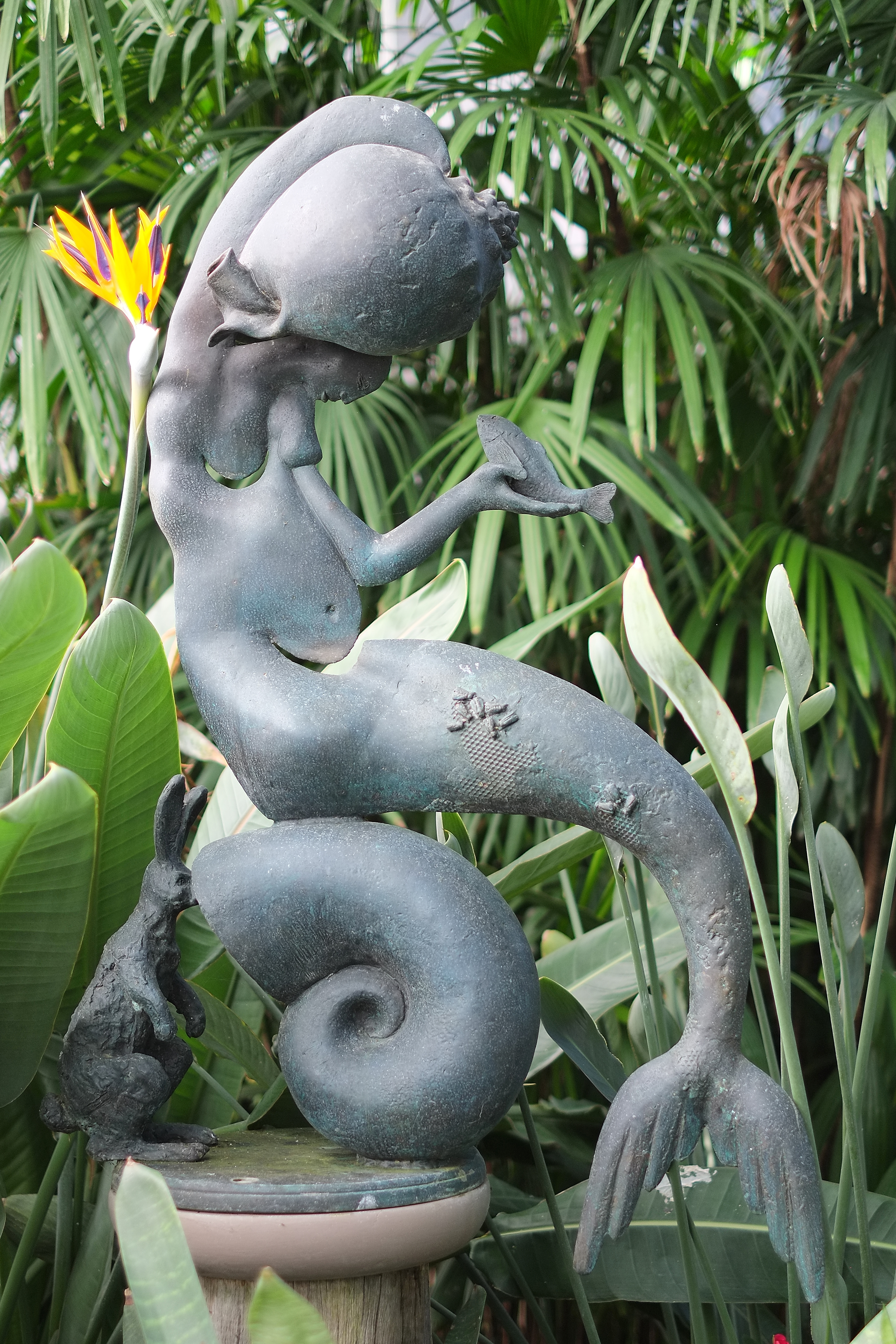
Looking and Listening for the Sea (1992), Wellington

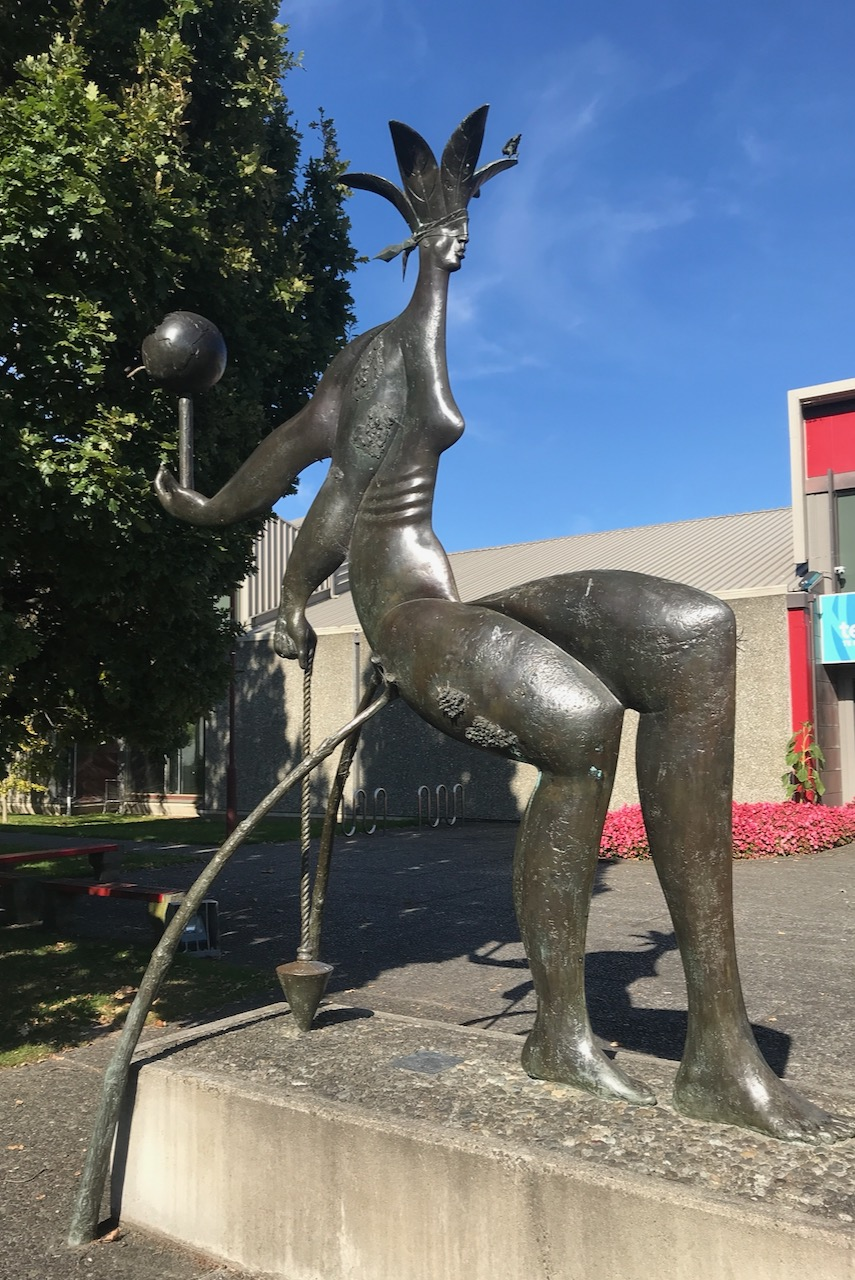
Pacific Monarch (1992), Te Manawa, Palmerston North

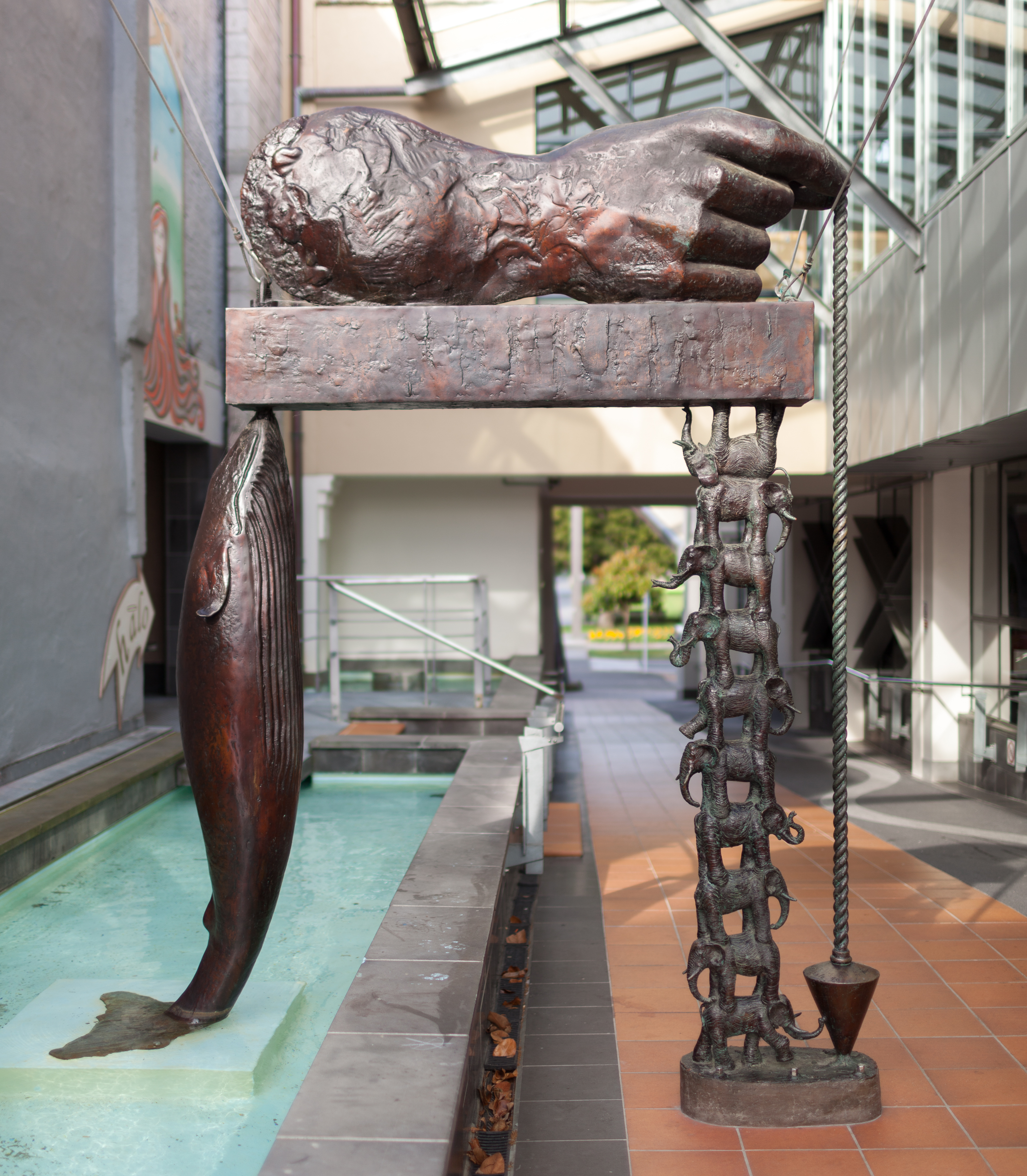
All Creatures Great (1996), Palmerston North

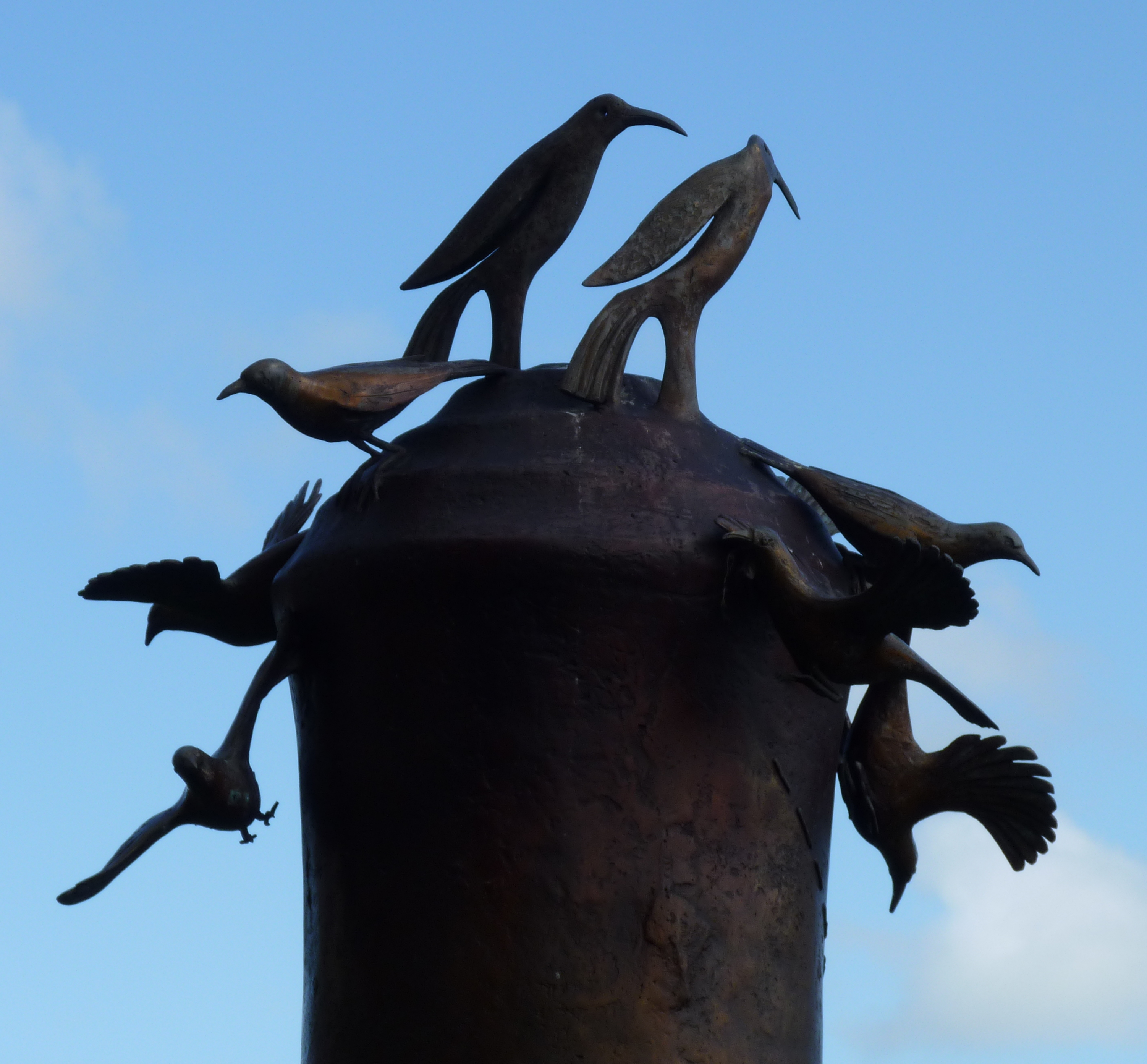
The Nectar Eaters (2004), Palmerston North

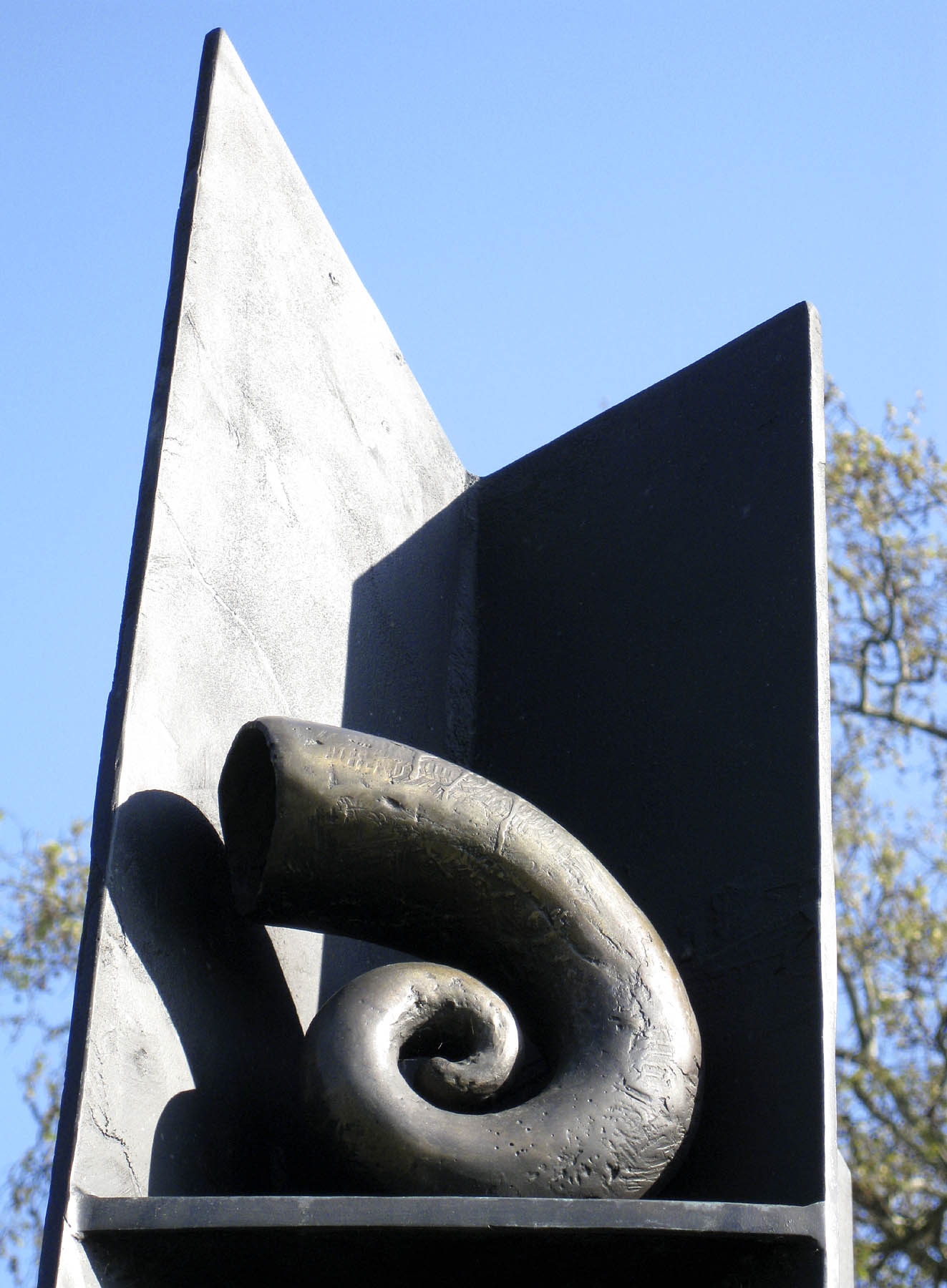
New Zealand War Memorial (2006), London

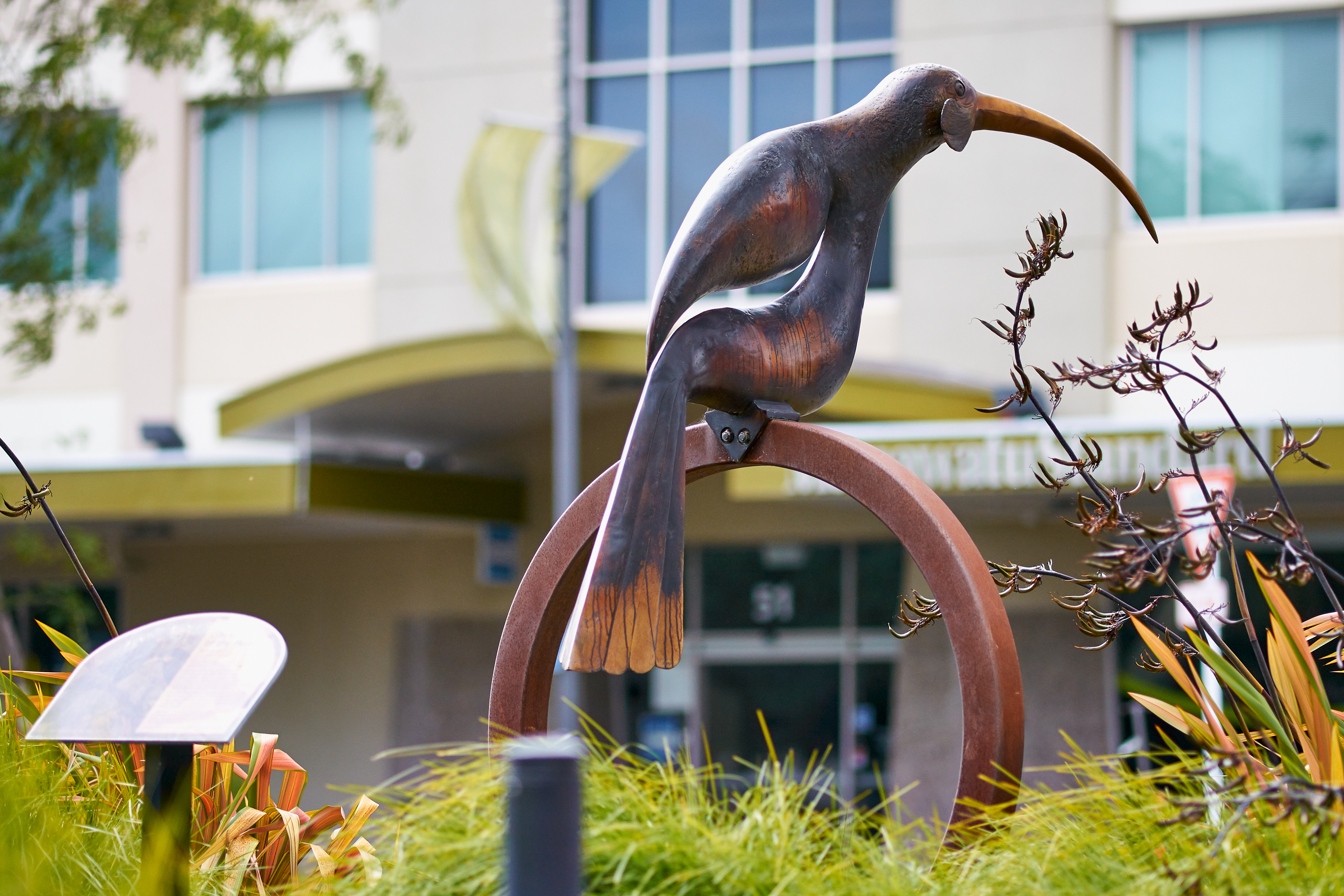
Ghost of the Huia (2010), Palmerston North

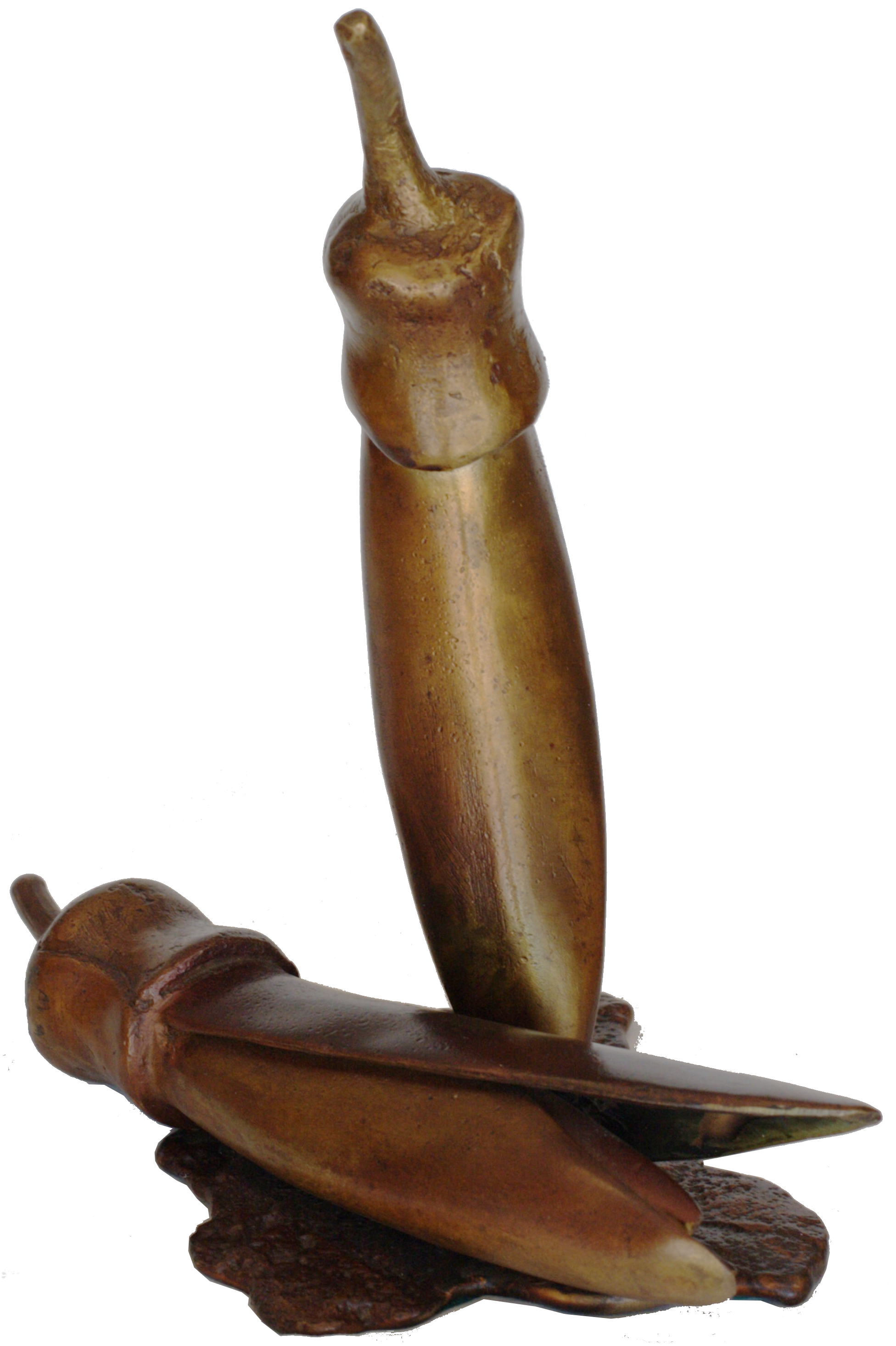
Kowhai (2011)

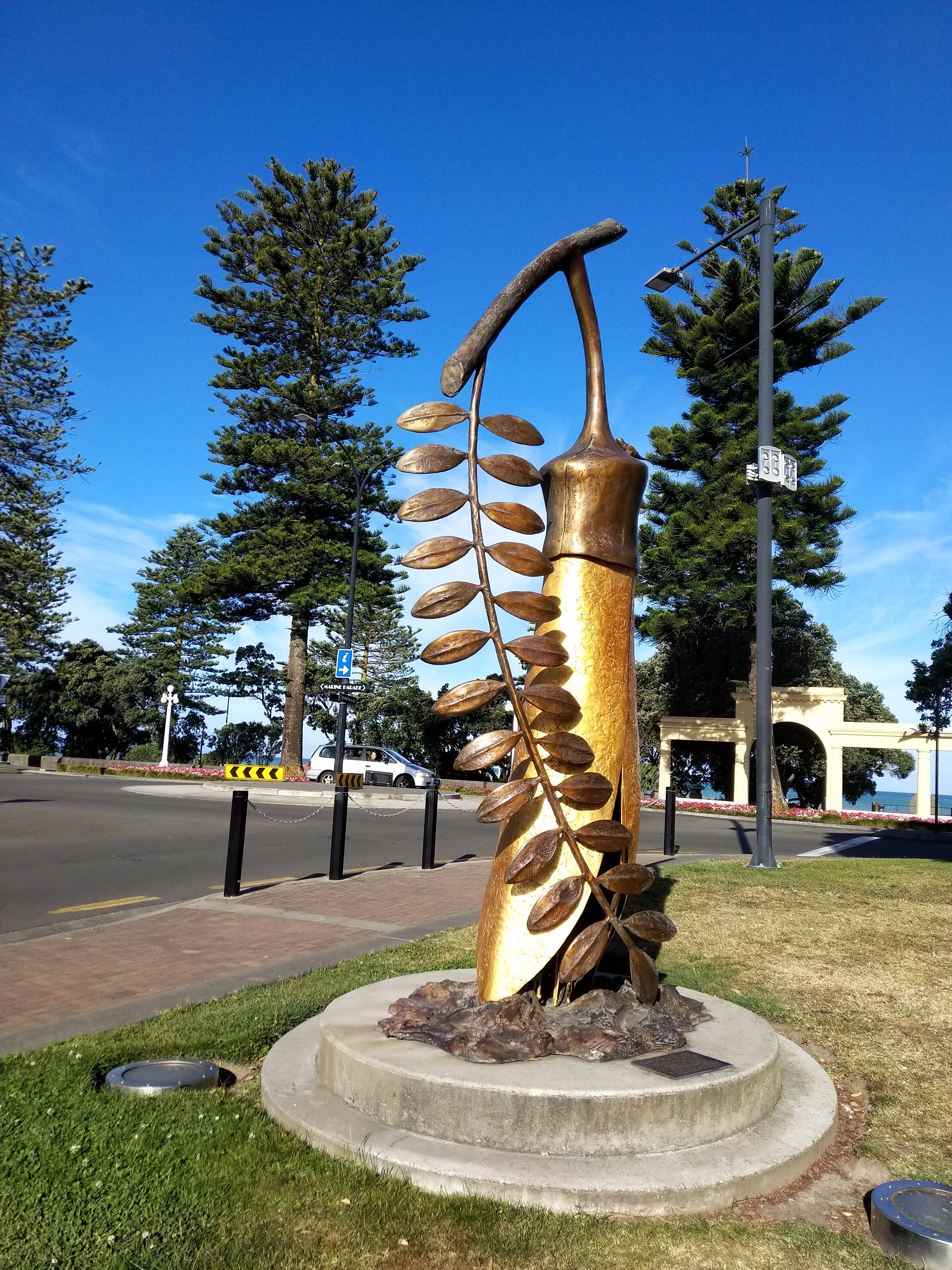
The Gold of the Kowhai (2014), Napier

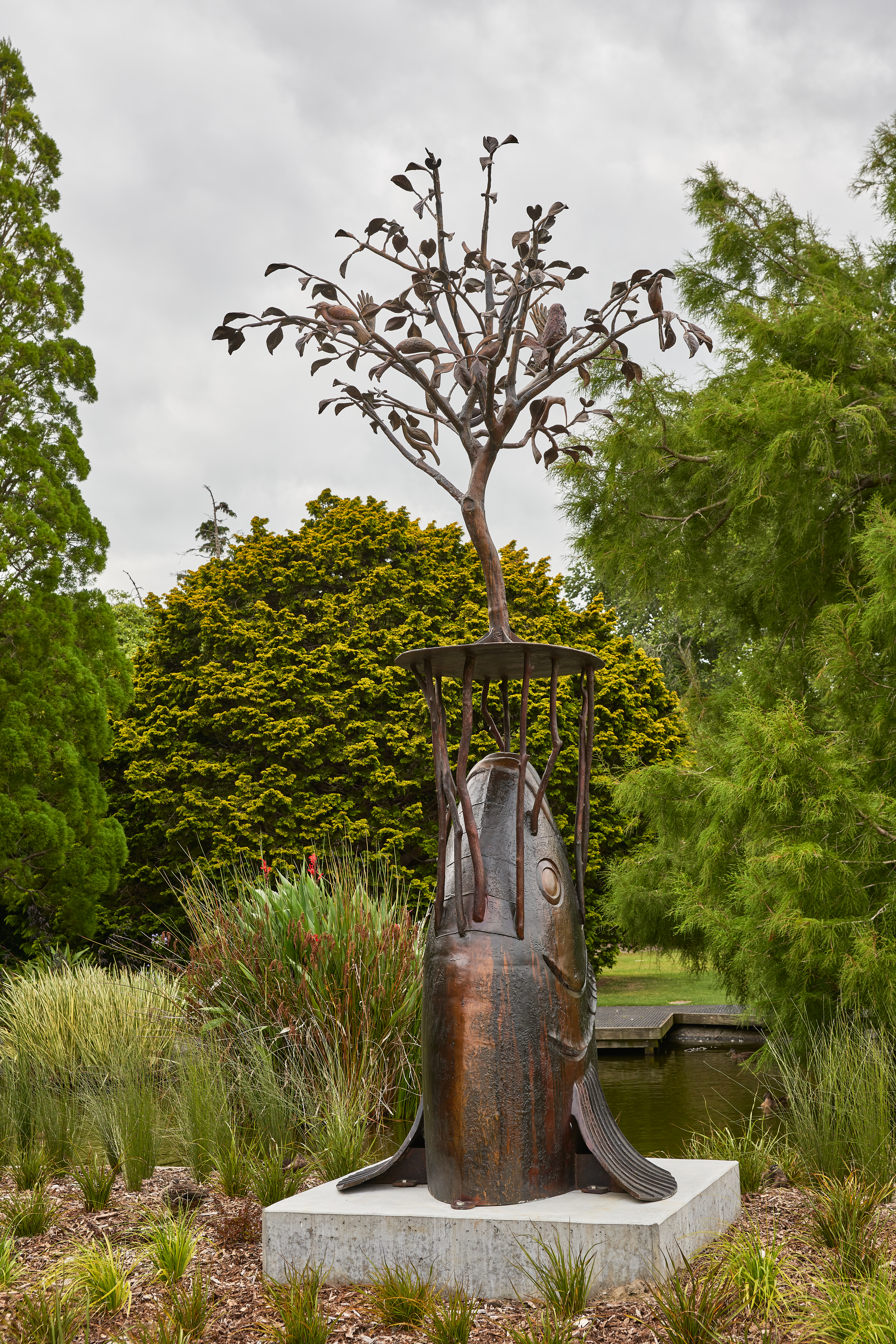
"Dawn Chorus on the Fish of Māui" (2019), Palmerston North
