= Davis Bay =

Bay in Antarctica

Davis Bay 66°08′S 134°05′E is a bay about 12 nautical miles (22 km; 14 mi) wide at the entrance between Cape Cesney and Lewis Island in Antarctica. It was discovered from the Aurora by the AAE (1910–1914) under Douglas Mawson. Named by Mawson for Capt. John King Davis, master of the Aurora and second-in-command of the expedition.

== Sources ==
- Alberts, Fred G., ed. (1995), Geographic Names of the Antarctic (PDF) (2 ed.), United States Board on Geographic Names This article incorporates public domain material from websites or documents of the United States Board on Geographic Names.
