= Mount Weddell =

Mountain in the Falkand Islands

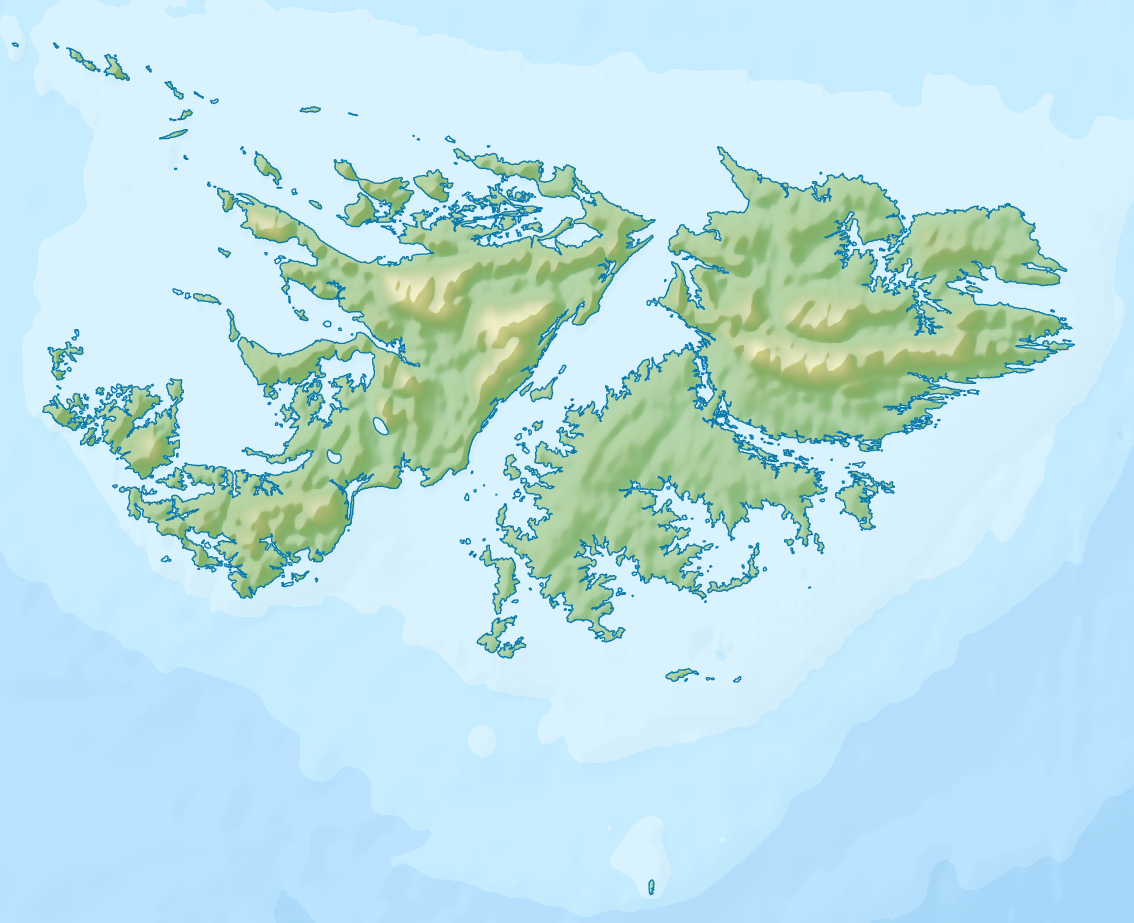
- Location within Falkland Islands

Highest point
- Elevation: 383 m (1,257 ft)
- Prominence: 383 m (1,257 ft)
- Coordinates: 51°55′23″S 60°57′12″W

Geography
- Location: Weddell Island, Falkland Islands, South Atlantic Ocean

Mount Weddell is the summit of Weddell Island in the Falkland Islands. The mountain rises to 383 metres (1,257 ft) and is situated 8 km northeast of Race Point, 9.8 km east of Pillar Bluff, 4.35 km southwest of Weddell Settlement and 4.6 km west-northwest of Circum Peak.

== Maps ==
- The Falkland Islands. Scale 1:401280 map. London: Edward Stanford, 1901
- Falkland Islands Explorer Map. Scale 1:365000. Ocean Explorer Maps, 2007
- Falklands Topographic Map Series. Scale 1:50000, 29 sheets. DOS 453, 1961-1979
- Falkland Islands. Scale 1:643000 Map. DOS 906. Edition 3-OS, 1998
- Approaches to the Falkland Islands. Scale 1:1500000 chart. Gps Nautical Charts, 2010
- Illustrated Map of Weddell Island

== Gallery ==
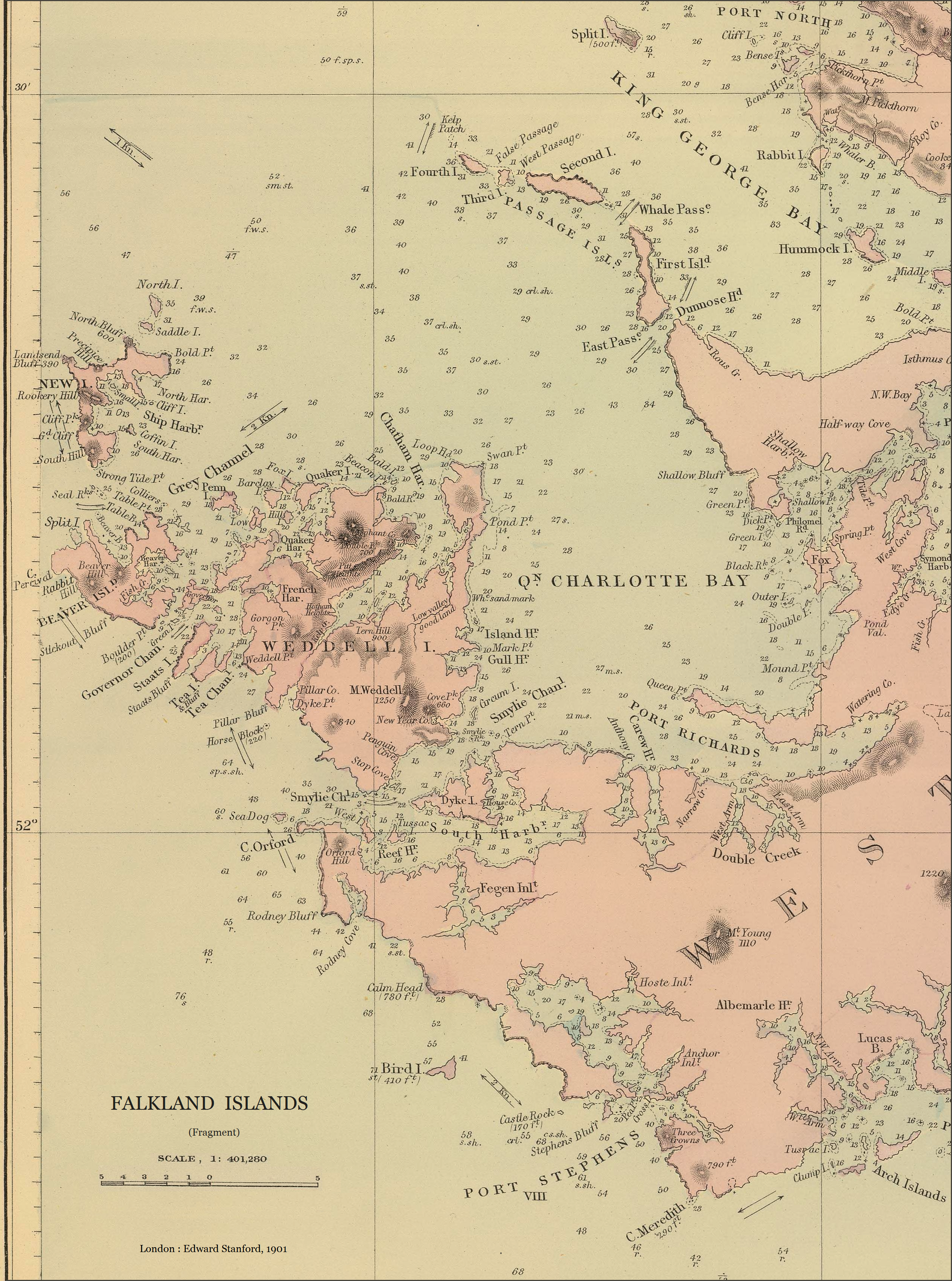
An old map featuring Mt Weddell put its height at 1250 ft (381 m)

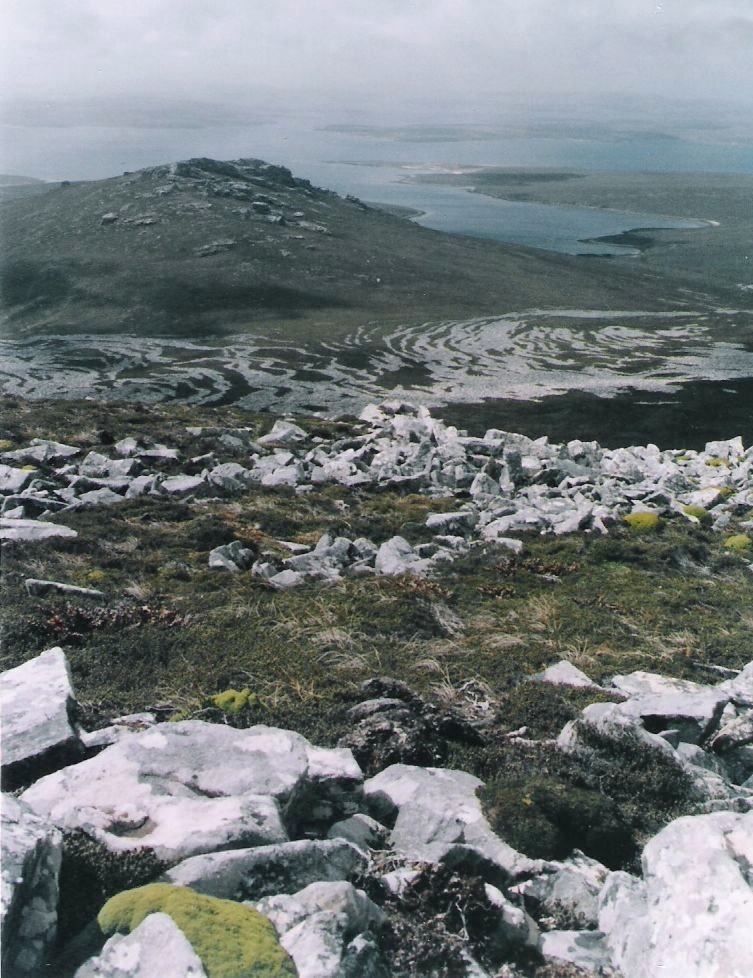
Circum Peak and New Year Cove from Mount Weddell, with Smylie Channel, Dyke Island and West Falkland in the background

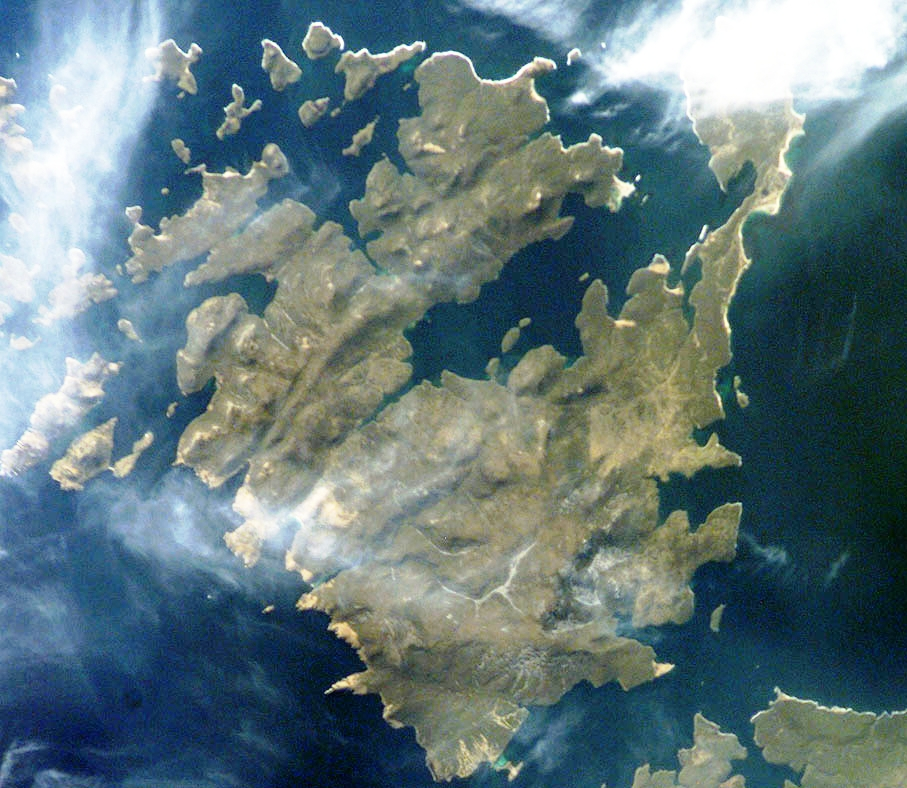
Satellite image of Weddell Island

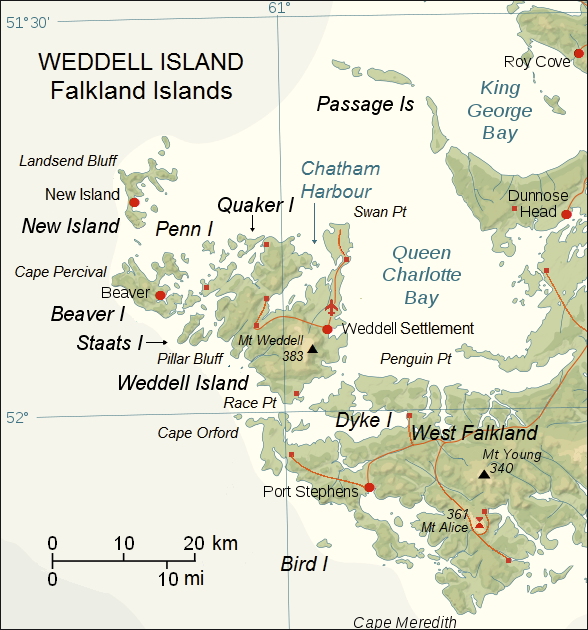
Map of Weddell Island
