= Circum Peak =

Mountain in the Falkland Islands

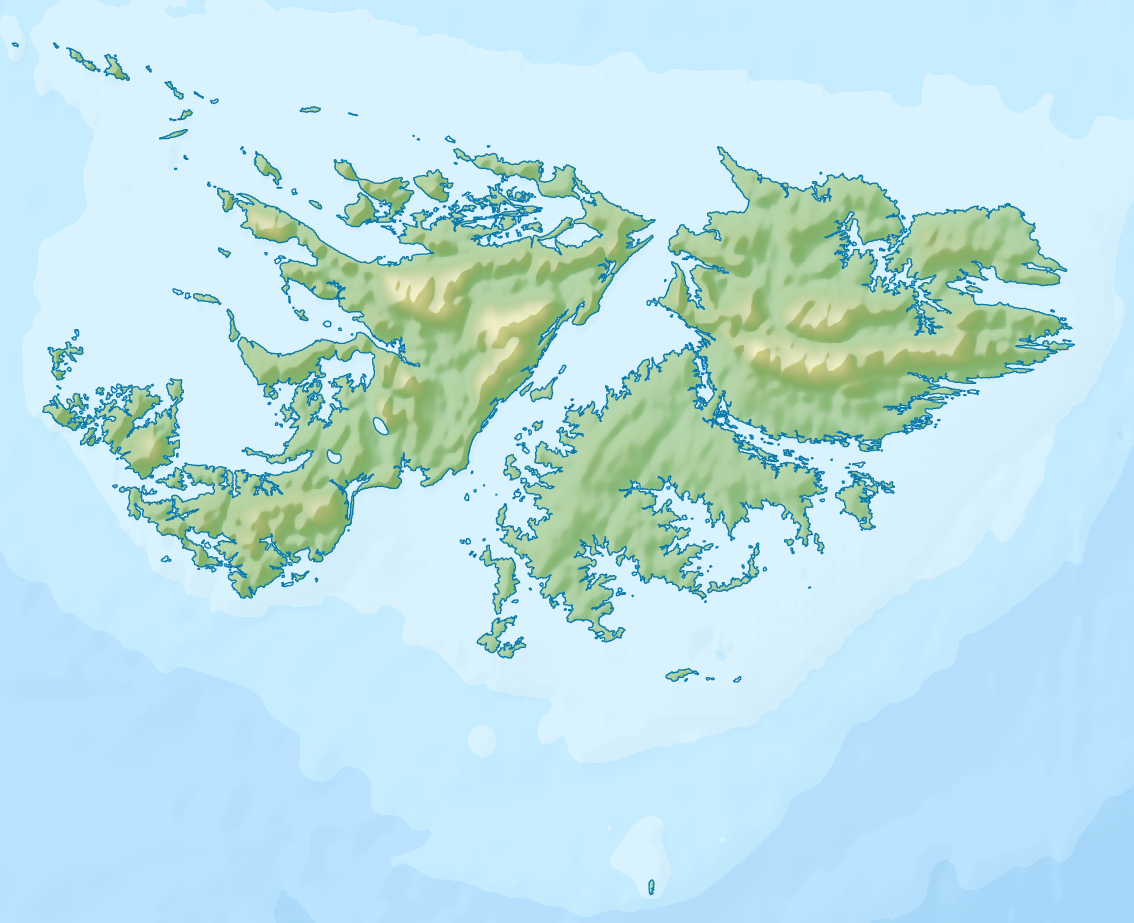
- Location within Falkland Islands

Highest point
- Coordinates: 51°55′45″S 60°55′27″W

Geography
- Location: Weddell Island, Falkland Islands, south Atlantic Ocean

Circum Peak is a hill rising to 198 m (650 ft) in the southeast part of Weddell Island in the Falkland Islands. It is located at, which is 2.12 km (1.32 mi) southeast of Mount Weddell, and surmounts New Year Cove to the southeast and Gull Harbour to the northeast.

== Maps ==
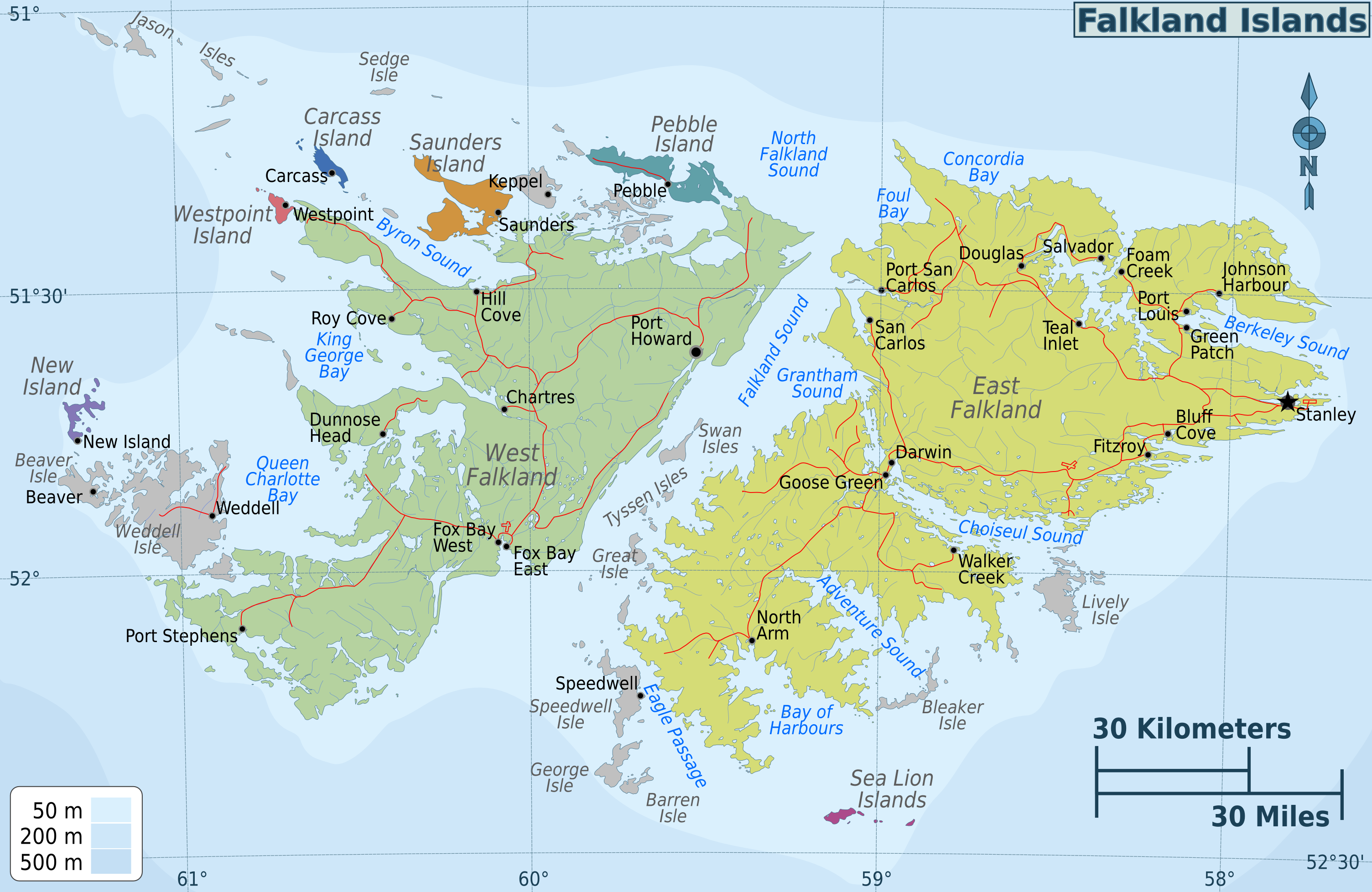
Location of Weddell Island in the Falkland Islands

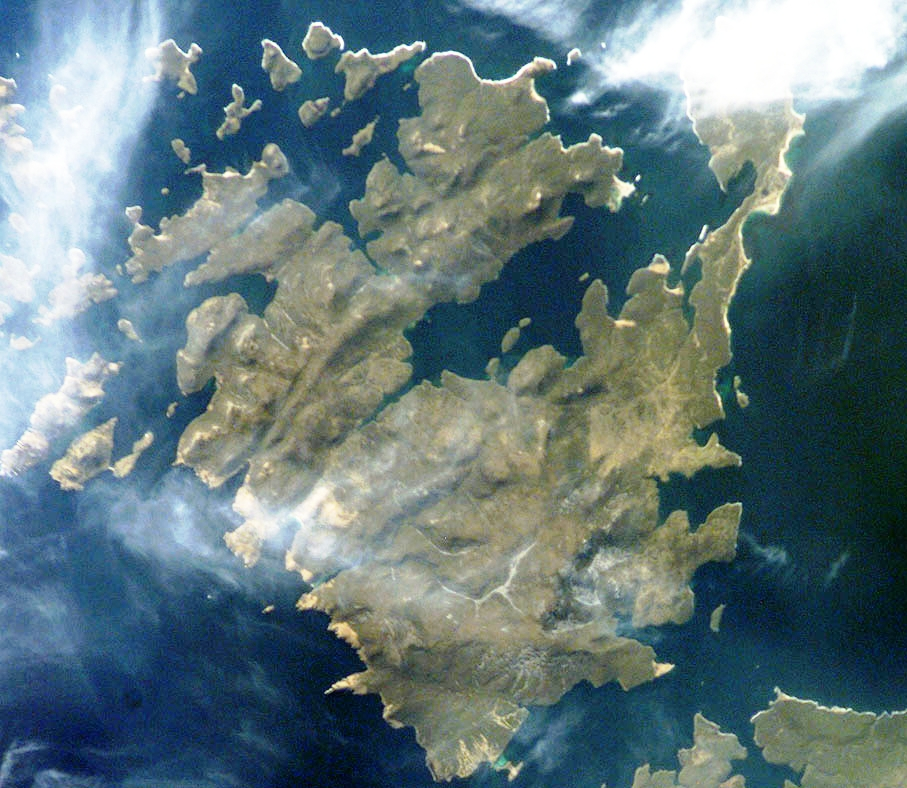
Satellite image of Weddell Island

- The Falkland Islands. Scale 1:401280 map. London: Edward Stanford, 1901
- Falkland Islands Explorer Map. Scale 1:365000. Ocean Explorer Maps, 2007
- Falklands Topographic Map Series. Scale 1:50000, 29 sheets. DOS 453, 1961-1979
- Falkland Islands. Scale 1:643000 Map. DOS 906. Edition 3-OS, 1998
- Approaches to the Falkland Islands. Scale 1:1500000 chart. Gps Nautical Charts, 2010
- Illustrated Map of Weddell Island

== Gallery ==
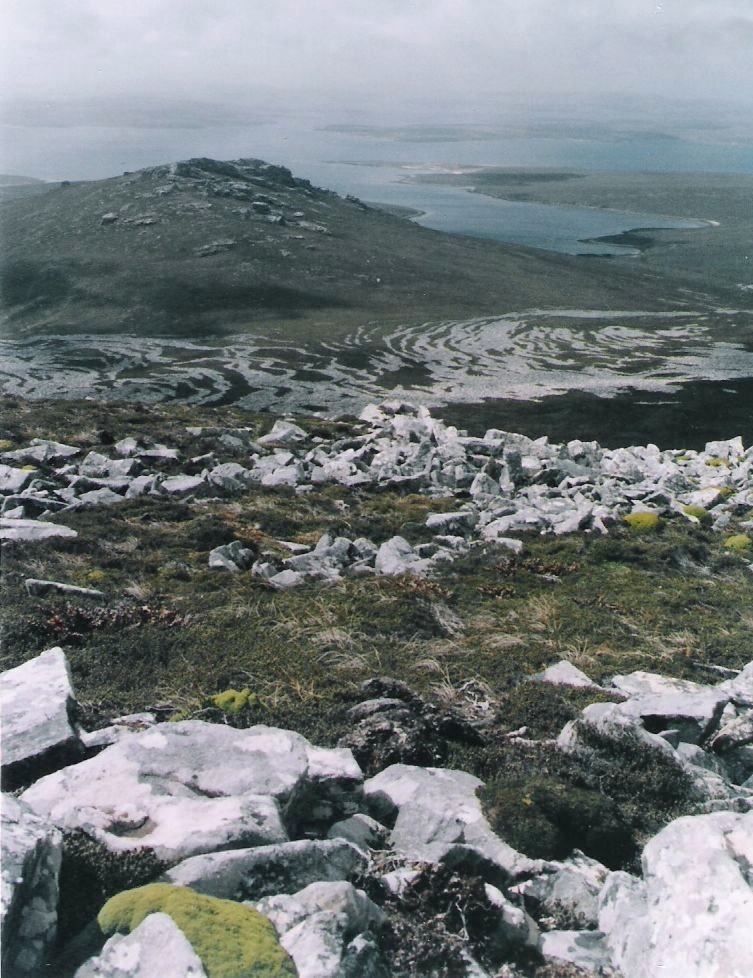
Massive stone runs in the foothills of Circum Peak; southeast view from Mount Weddell

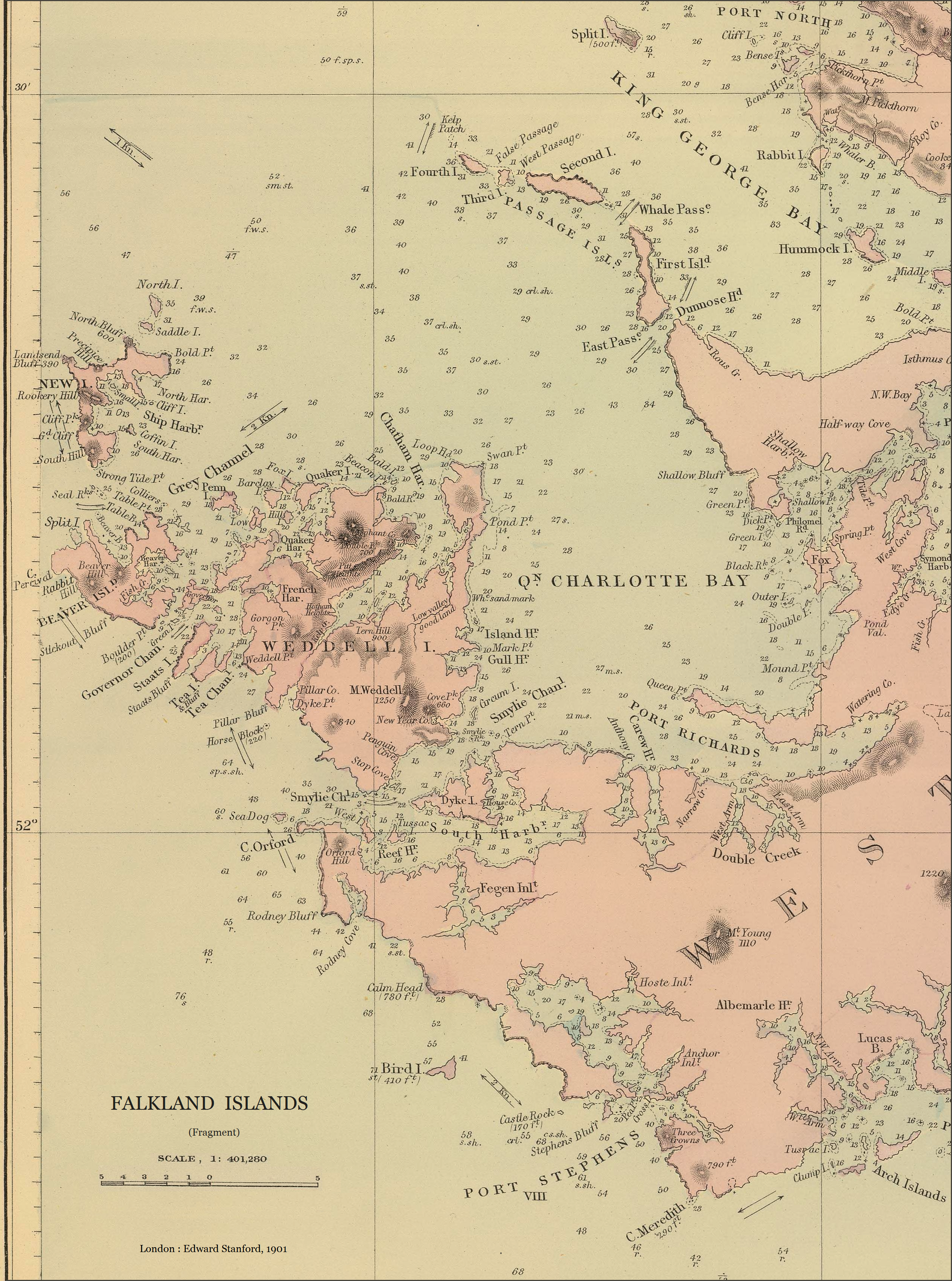
Old map of Weddell Island featuring Cove Peak (present Circum Peak)

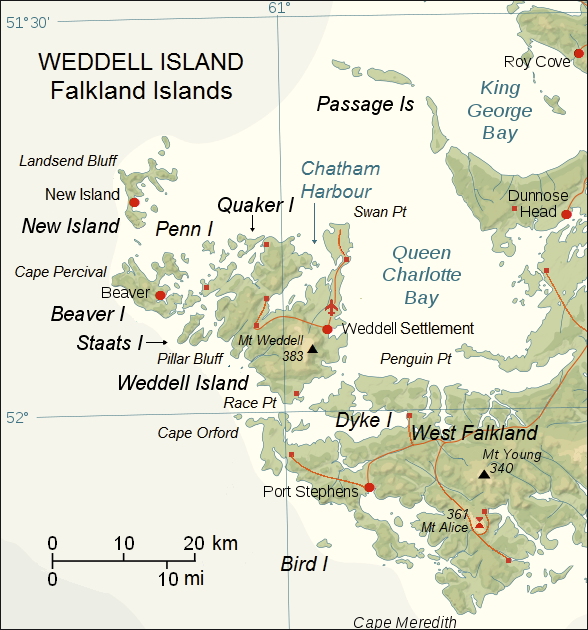
Map of Weddell Island
