= Weddell Settlement =

Settlement on Weddell Island, Falkland Islands

- Settlement
- Location within Falkland Islands
- Coordinates: 51°53′37″S 60°54′35″W
- Country/Territory: Falkland Islands
- Island: Weddell Island
- Bay: Gull Harbour (formerly Great Harbour)

Population (2018)
  - Total: 3
- Website: Weddell Island Official Website

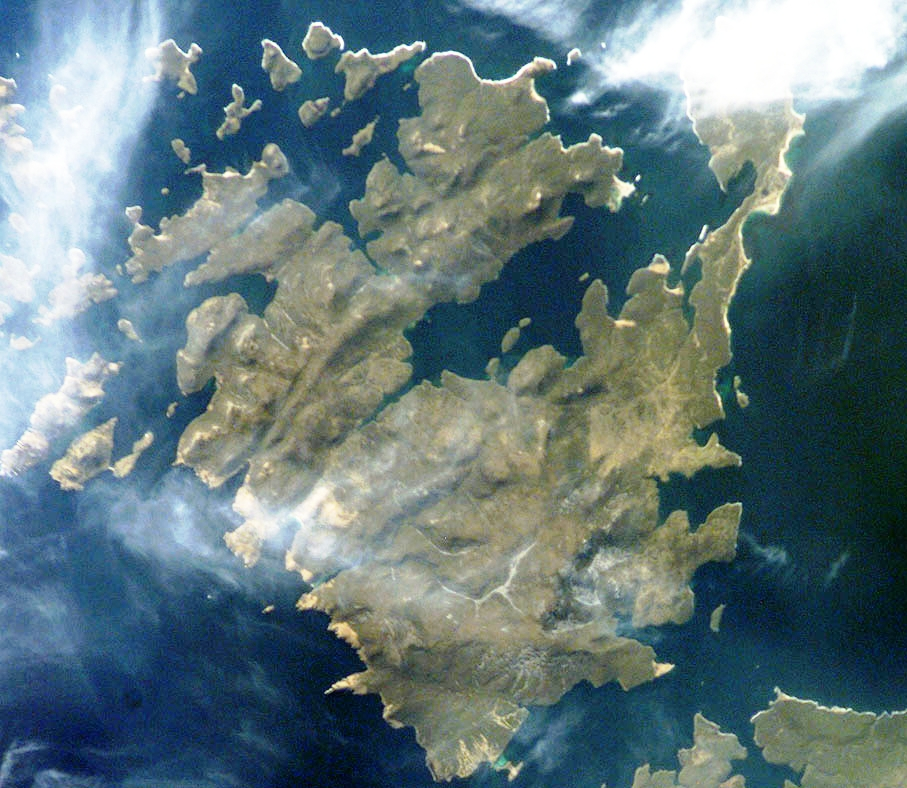
Satellite image of Weddell Island

Weddell Settlement is the only settlement on Weddell Island in the Falkland Islands, situated on the east coast of the island at the head of the sheltered Gull Harbour (formerly Great Harbour.), part of Queen Charlotte Bay. It is located 12.15 kilometres (7.55 mi) northeast of Race Point, 15 kilometres (9.3 mi) south by west of Swan Point, 212 kilometres (132 mi) west-southwest of Stanley and 56.6 kilometres (35.2 mi) west of Fox Bay on West Falkland. The population was 3 in 2018.

== Demographics ==
The settlement provides the logistic base for Weddell Island’s sheep farming and tourist industries. Sea transportation is serviced by a 50-meter pier. The island’s airfield is situated 2.7 kilometres (1.7 mi) north of Weddell Settlement, and has two intersecting unpaved runways (470 metres (1,540 ft) and 400 metres (1,300 ft) long respectively) used by the Falkland Islands Government Air Service (FIGAS) Islander aircraft operating out of Stanley Airport. There are two unpaved earth roads on the island, both leaving Weddell Settlement. One of them, 13 km (8.1 mi) long, runs towards the airfield and further north to Loop Head Shanty and the headland ending up in Loop Head and Swan Point. The other one leads 15 km (9.3 mi) in westerly direction, skirting the head of Chatham Harbour and turning north at Kelp Creek House to reach Chatham House at the southwest corner of the bay.

The tourist and farming infrastructure at Weddell Settlement is currently being renovated; in particular, the Weddell Lodge is being extended to provide additional tourist and workers accommodation during the summer period.

== Maps ==
- The Falkland Islands. Scale 1:401280 map. London: Edward Stanford, 1901
- Falkland Islands Explorer Map. Scale 1:365000. Ocean Explorer Maps, 2007
- Falklands Topographic Map Series. Scale 1:50000, 29 sheets. DOS 453, 1961-1979
- Falkland Islands. Scale 1:643000 Map. DOS 906. Edition 3-OS, 1998
- Map 500k--xm20-4. 1:500000 map of Weddell Island and part of West Falkland. Russian Army Maps (for the world)
- Approaches to the Falkland Islands (Marine Chart : AR_2505_0). Scale 1:1500000 chart. Gps Nautical Charts, 2010
- Illustrated Map of Weddell Island

== Gallery ==
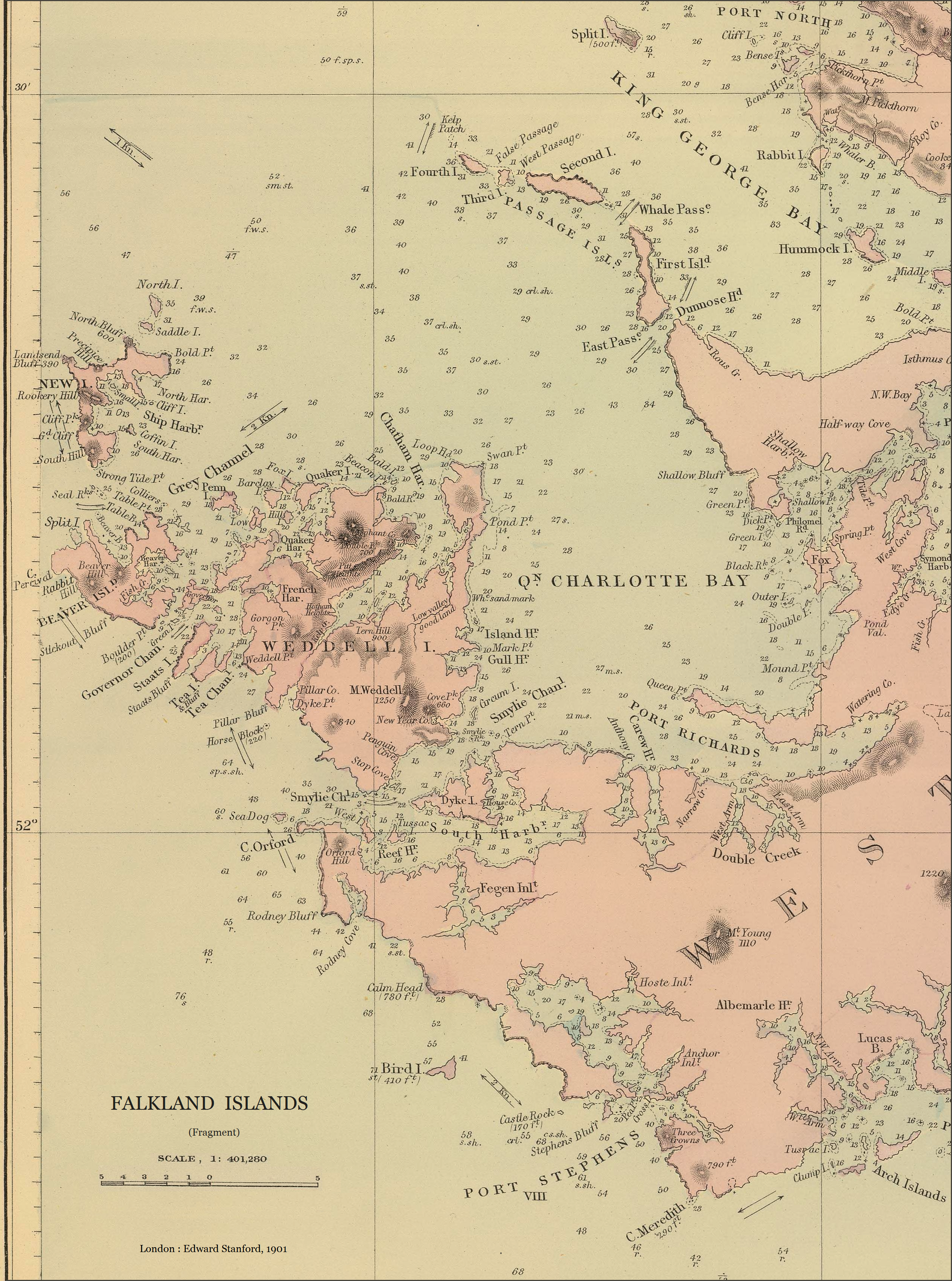
Old map of Weddell Island

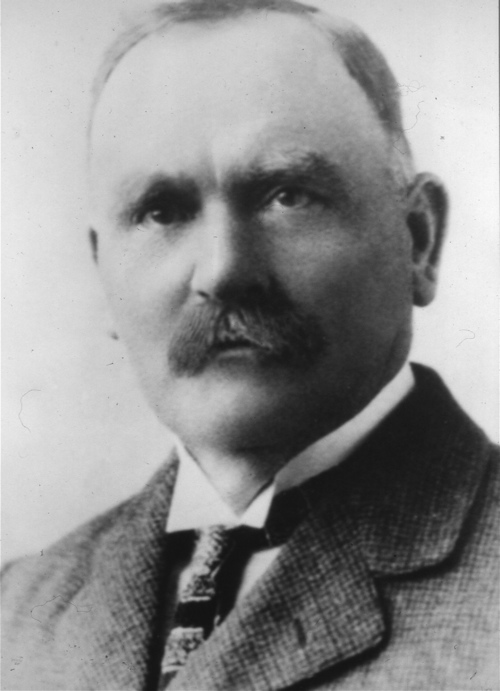
Sheep farmer John Hamilton whose family owned the settlement and the island from 1923 to 1987

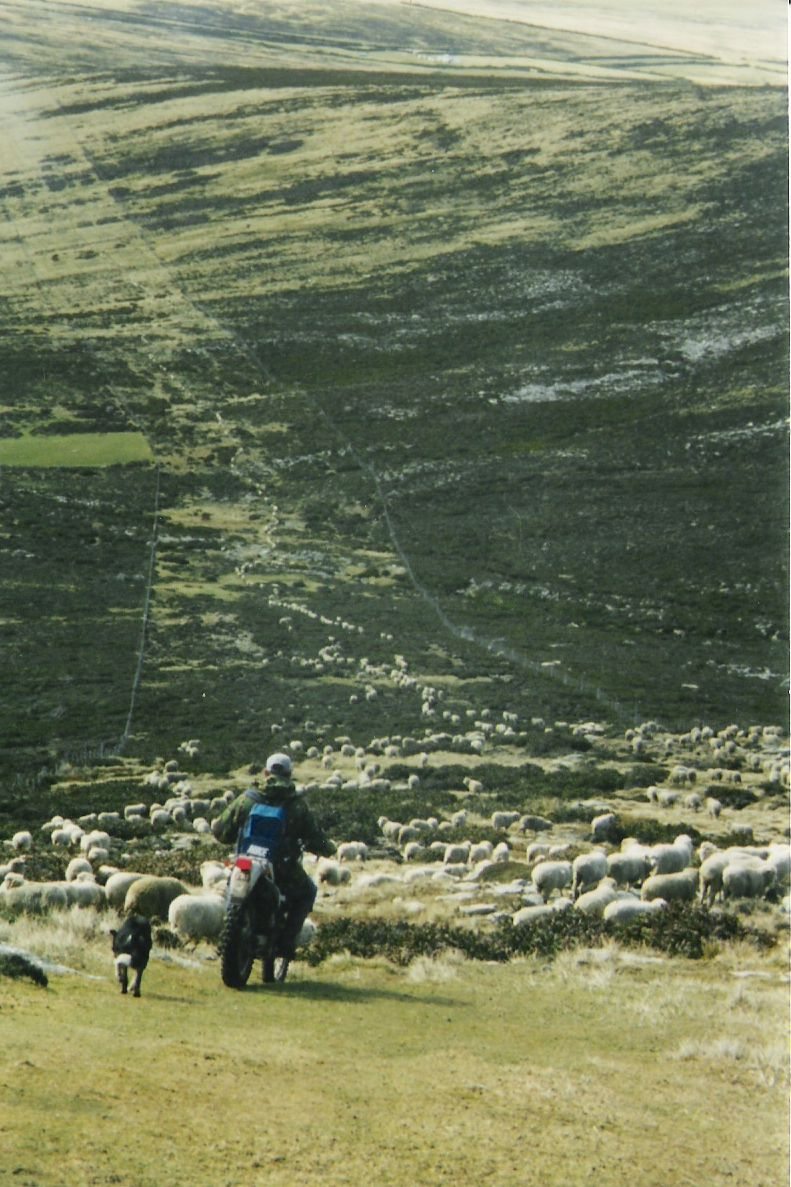
Sheep gathering on Weddell Island

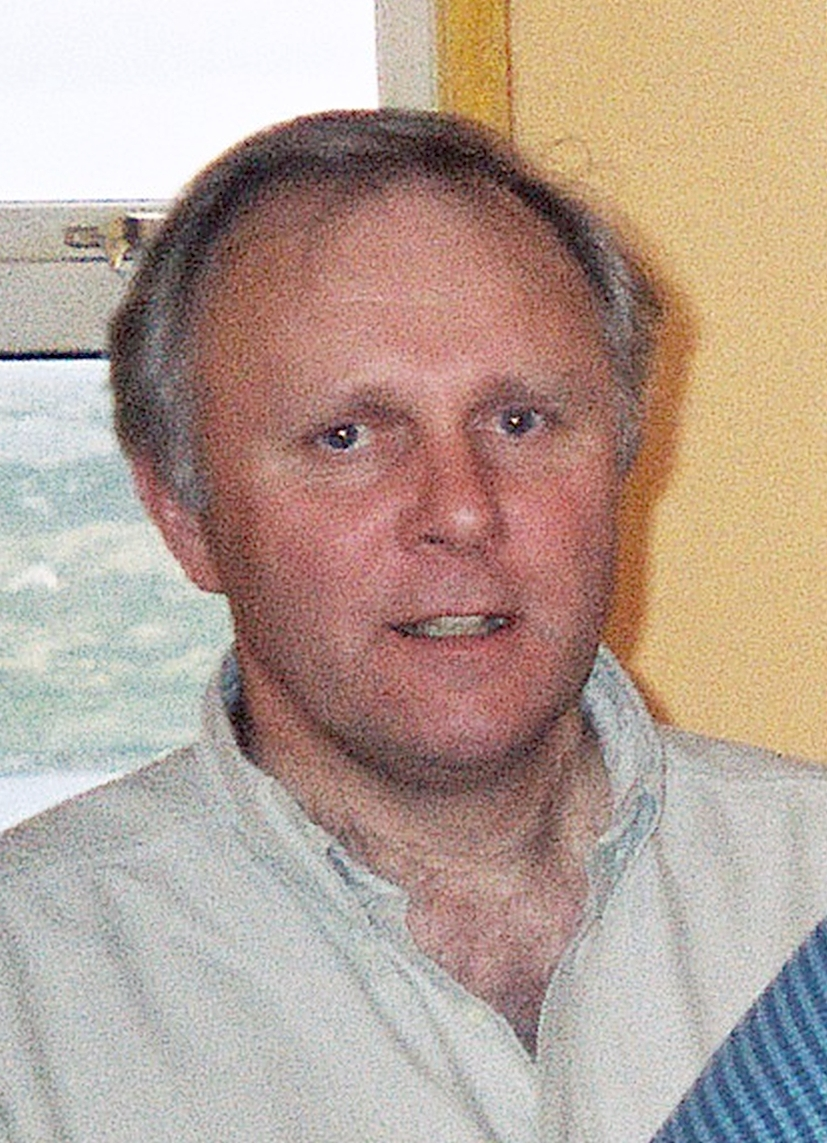
The brothers Lewis (pictured) and Stephen Clifton own the island since 2015

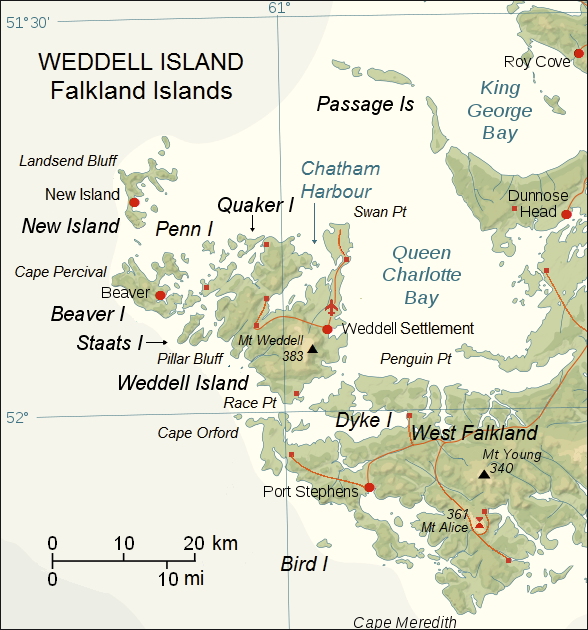
Map of Weddell Island
