= Bald Island, Weddell Island =

Bald Island
- Island
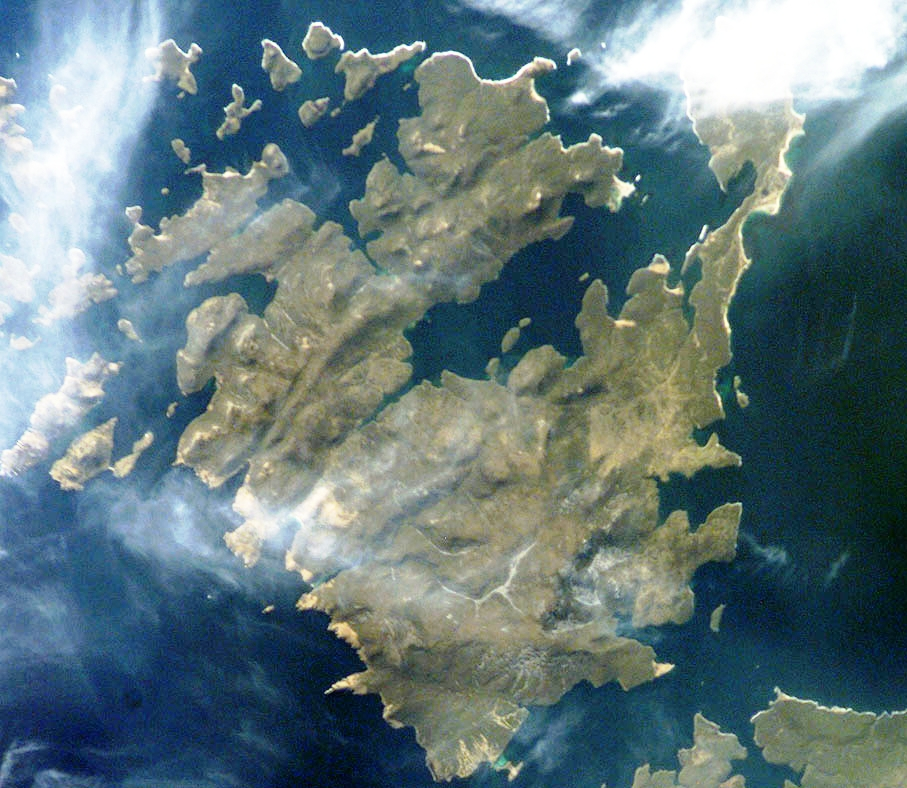
- Satellite image of Weddell Island

- Penn Island shown within the Falkland Islands
- Coordinates: 51.77608°S 60.96422°W
- Country: Falkland Islands
- Time zone: UTC−3 (FKST)
- If shown, area and population ranks are for all islands and all inhabited islands in the Falklands respectively.

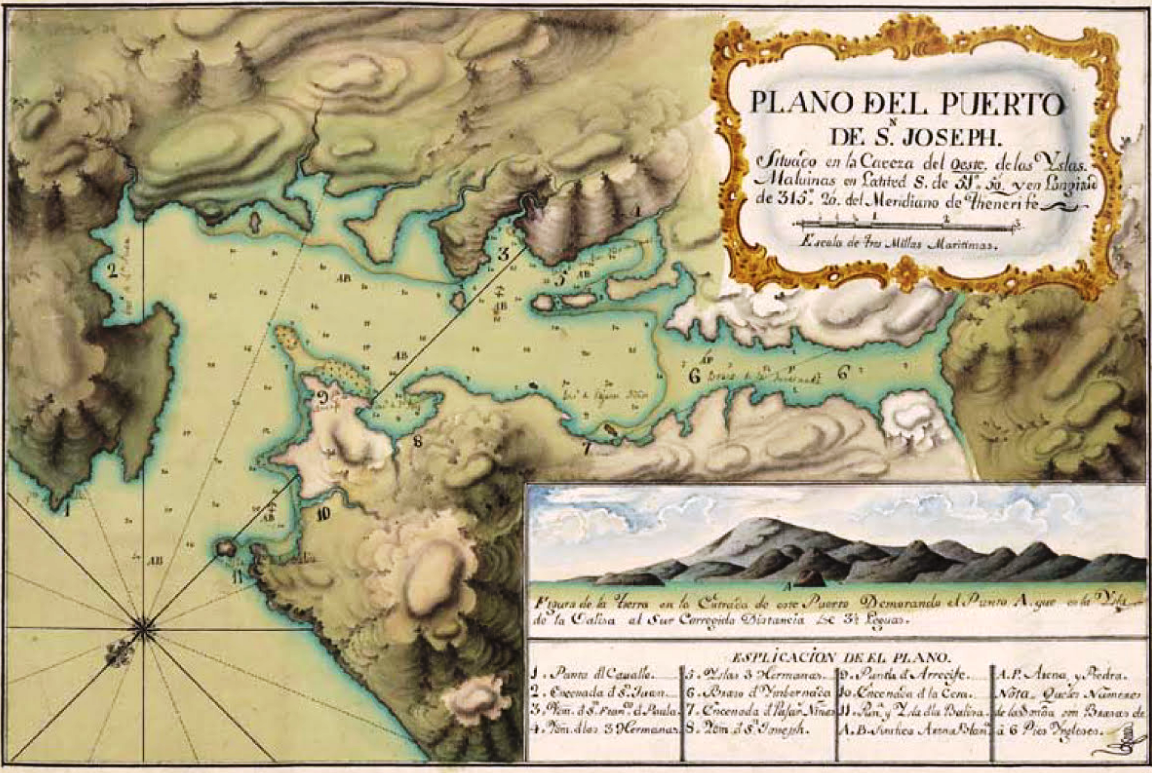
A post 1770 large scale, southeast-up map of Chatham Harbour (Puerto de San Joseph in the title); the illustration shows a north view of the harbour entrance marked by Bald Island (island “A”), with Mount Weddell prominent in the background

Bald Island is an uninhabited island in the Weddell Island Group of the Falkland Islands. It is located off Beacon Point, on the west side of the entrance to Chatham Harbour.

== Maps ==
- The Falkland Islands. Scale 1:401280 map. London: Edward Stanford, 1901
- Falkland Islands Explorer Map. Scale 1:365000. Ocean Explorer Maps, 2007
- Falklands Topographic Map Series. Scale 1:50000, 29 sheets. DOS 453, 1961–1979
- Falkland Islands. Scale 1:643000 Map. DOS 906. Edition 3-OS, 1998
- Map 500k--xm20-4. 1:500000 map of Weddell Island and part of West Falkland. Russian Army Maps (for the world)
