= Chatham Harbour, Weddell Island =

Bay in the Falkland Islands

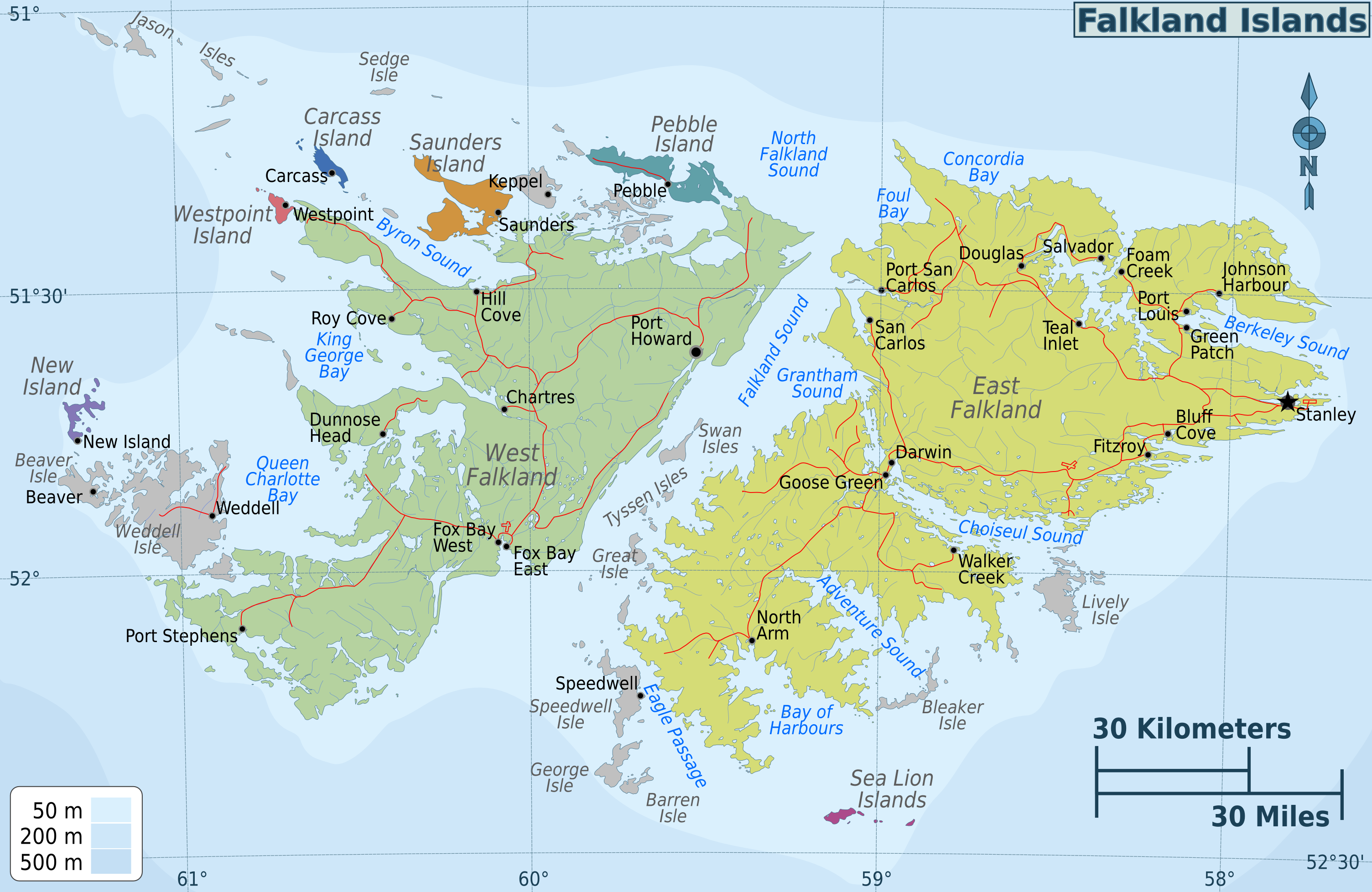
Location of Weddell Island at the western (left) end of the Falkland Islands

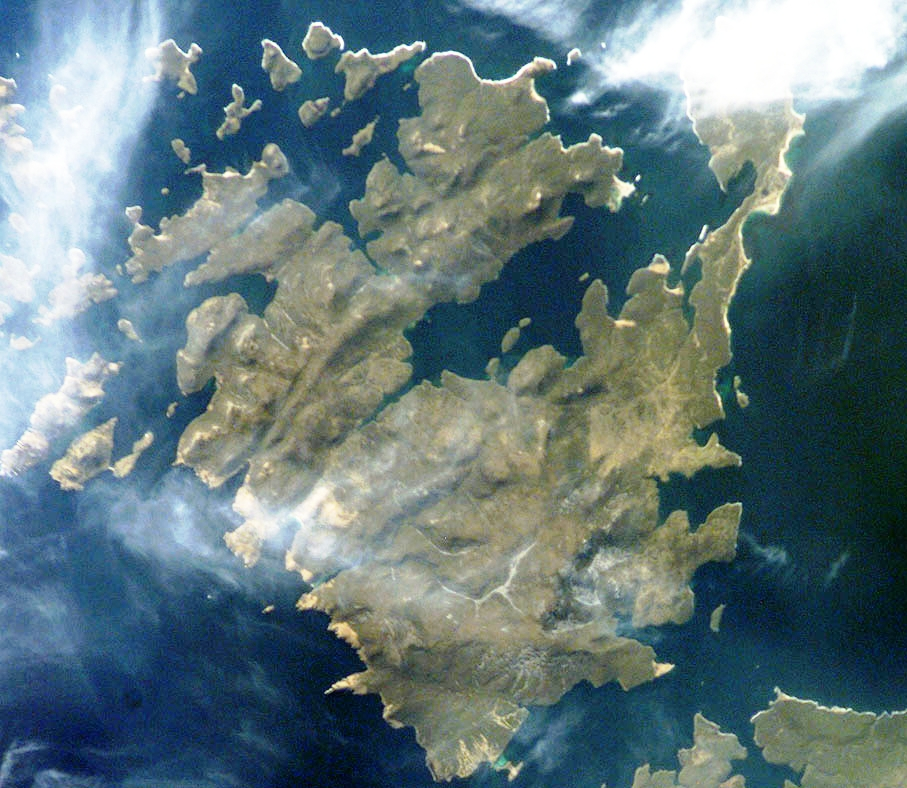
Satellite image of Weddell Island, with Chatham Harbour at top right and centre

Chatham Harbour (former name States Bay, Spanish: Puerto de San Joseph, Puerto de San José) is the large bay indenting the central part of Weddell Island in the Falkland Islands. It is entered east of Beacon Point and west of Loop Head. The 3 km wide bay extends 5 km in southeast direction, this part of the feature forming an anchorage named Bald Road, and north of Clay Point turning for 10 km in southwest direction. Chatham Harbour is centred at 51°50′16″S 60°57′32″W.

States Cove (former names States Harbour, Hussey Harbour) is an estuary on the southeast side of Chatham Harbour, centred at 51°50′15″S 60°54′15″W.

== Maps ==
- The Falkland Islands. Scale 1:401280 map. London: Edward Stanford, 1901
- Falkland Islands Explorer Map. Scale 1:365000. Ocean Explorer Maps, 2007
- Falklands Topographic Map Series. Scale 1:50000, 29 sheets. DOS 453, 1961-1979
- Falkland Islands. Scale 1:643000 Map. DOS 906. Edition 3-OS, 1998
- Map 500k--xm20-4. 1:500000 map of Weddell Island and part of West Falkland. Russian Army Maps (for the world)
- Approaches to the Falkland Islands. Scale 1:1500000 chart. Gps Nautical Charts, 2010
- Illustrated Map of Weddell Island

== Gallery ==
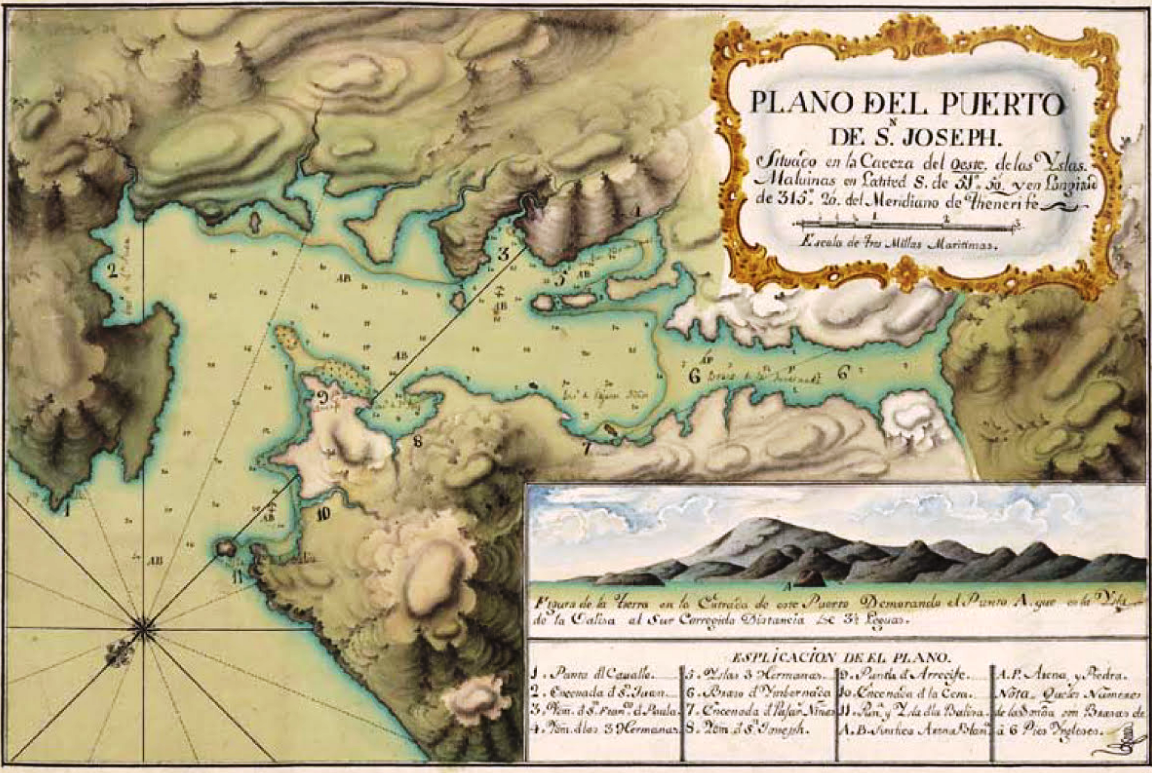
A post 1770 large scale, southeast-up map of Chatham Harbour (Puerto de San Joseph in the title); the illustration shows a north view of the harbour entrance marked by Bald Island (island “A”), with Mount Weddell prominent in the background

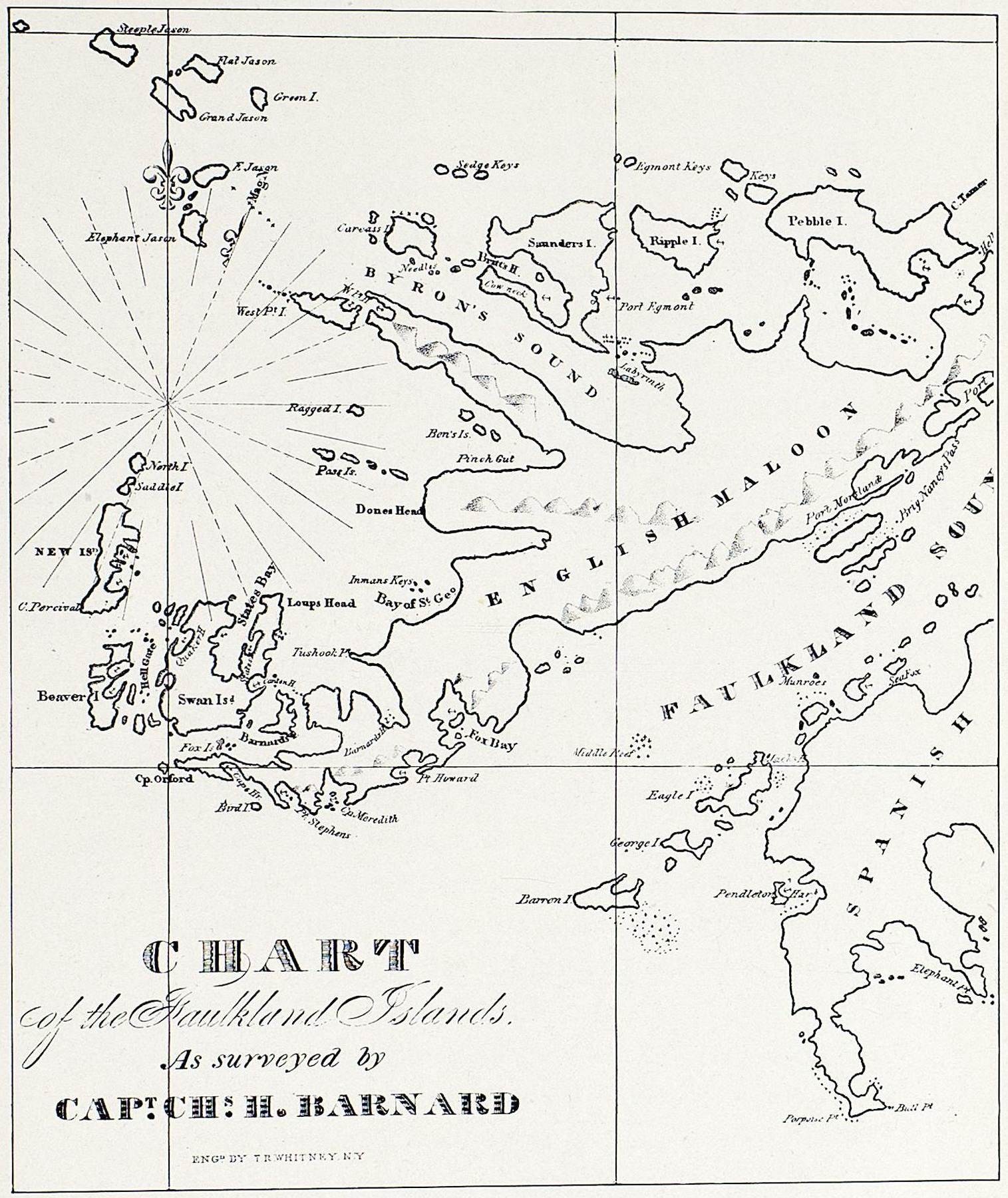
States Bay, States Harbour and Swan Island (present Chatham Harbour, States Cove and Weddell Island) on a pre 1829 Falklands map by Charles Barnard

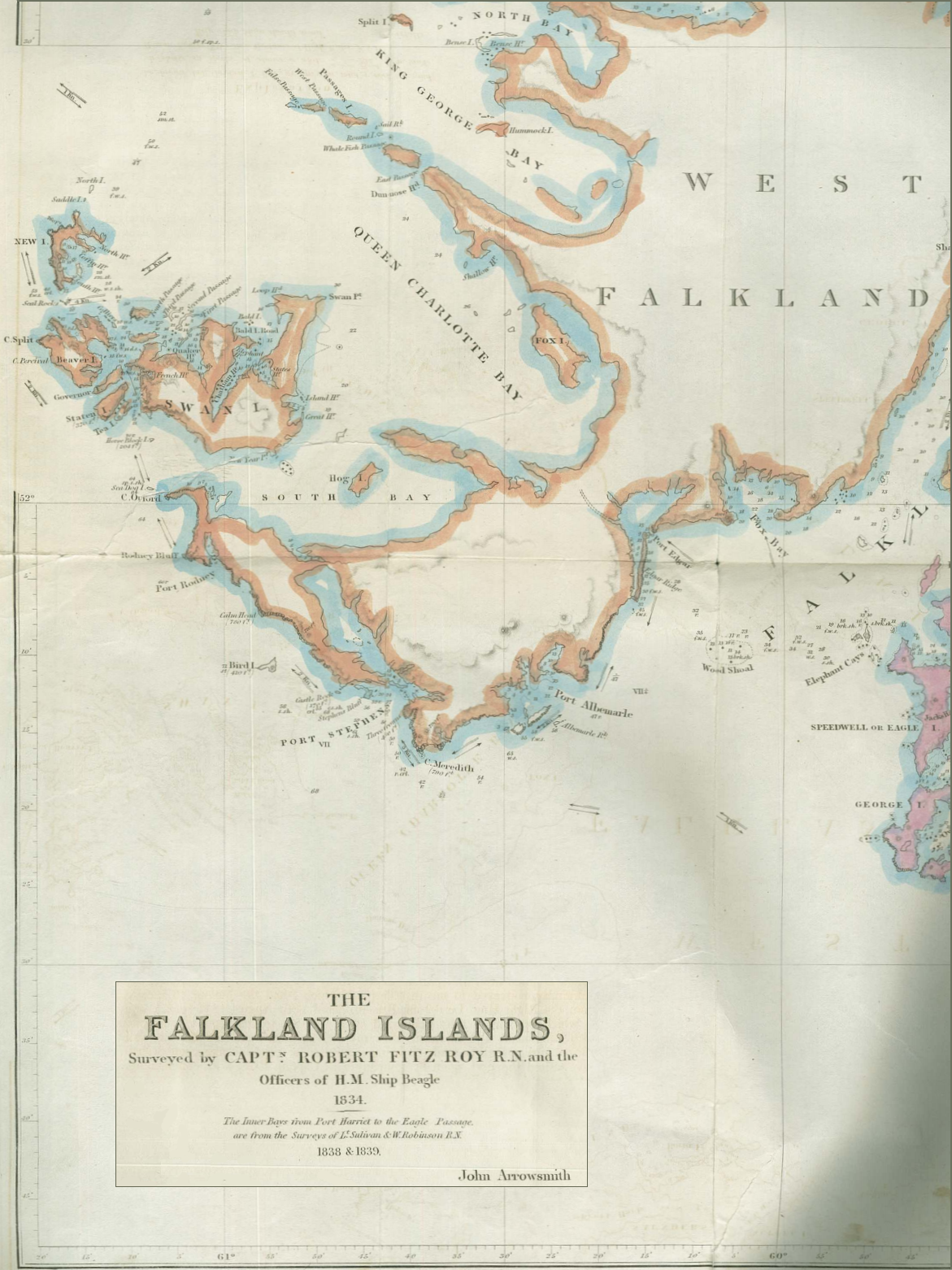
1841 Falkland Islands map by John Arrowsmith, fragment featuring Swan Island, States Harbour and Great Harbour (present Weddell Island, States Cove and Gull Harbour)

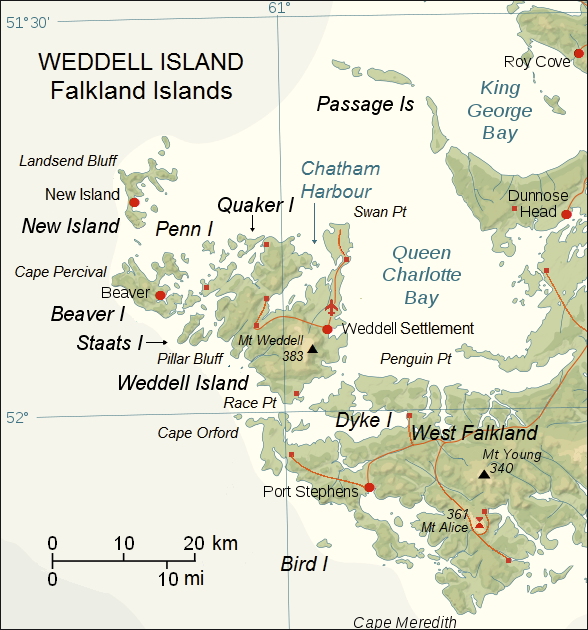
Map of Weddell Island
