= Race Point =

Locality on Weddell Island

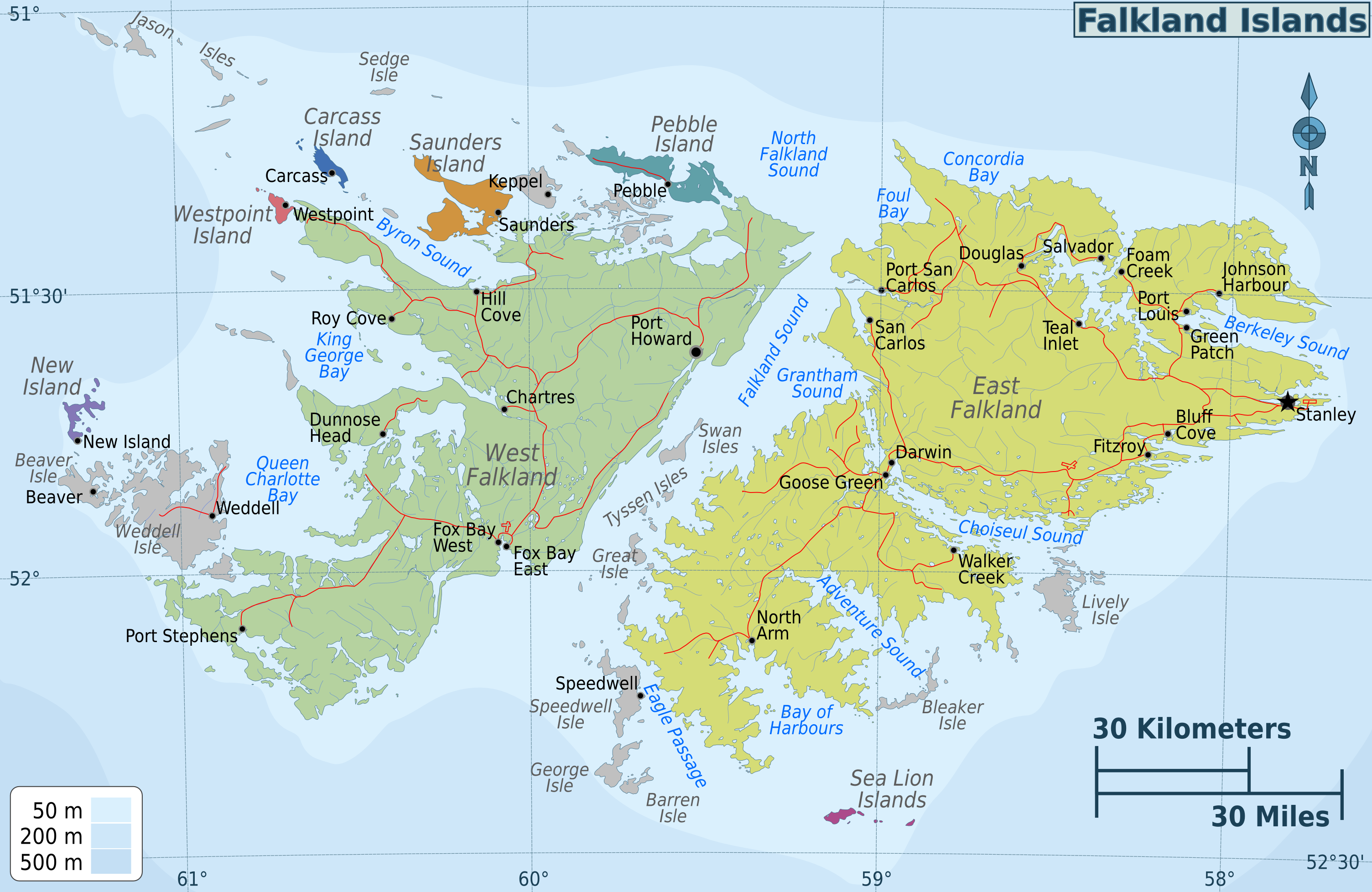
Location of Weddell Island in the Falkland Islands

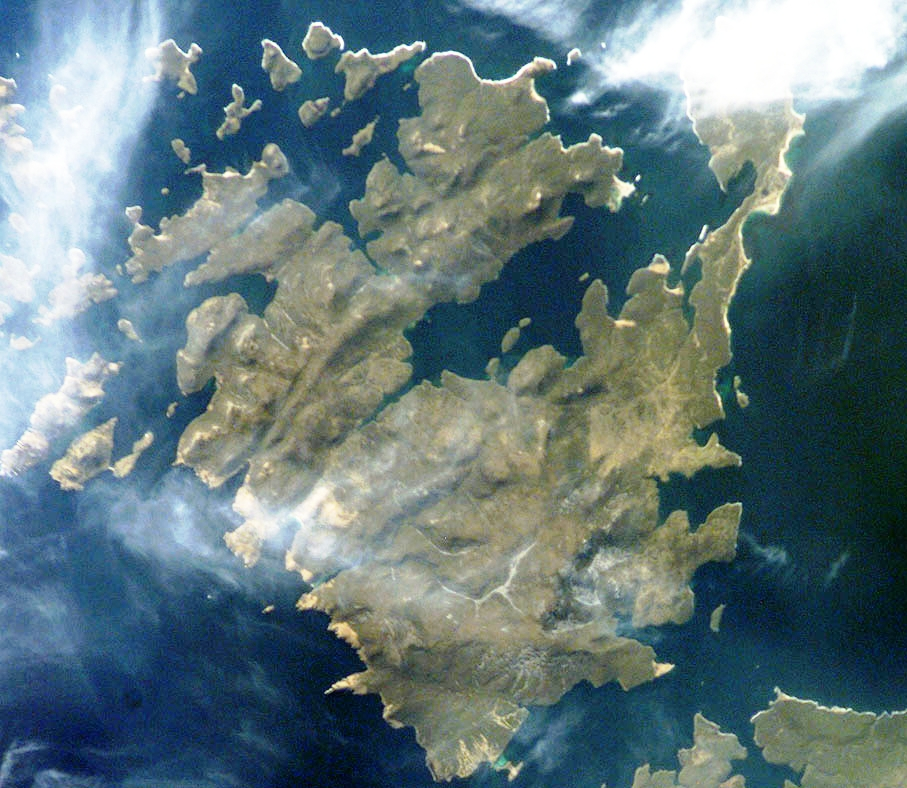
Satellite image of Weddell Island

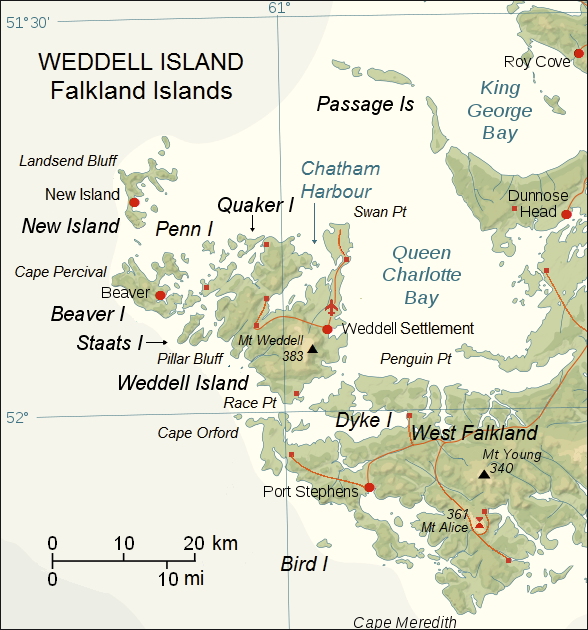
Map of Weddell Island

Race Point is the point on the north side of Smylie Channel forming the south extremity of Weddell Island in the Falkland Islands. The point is located at 51°59′22″S 61°00′00″W, which is 26.7 km south-southwest of Swan Point, 3.5 km west-northwest of neighbouring Dyke Island, 1.8 km north of West Island and 4 km north-northeast of Orford Hill, West Falkland.

== Maps ==
- The Falkland Islands. Scale 1:401280 map. London: Edward Stanford, 1901
- Falkland Islands Explorer Map. Scale 1:365000. Ocean Explorer Maps, 2007
- Falklands Topographic Map Series. Scale 1:50000, 29 sheets. DOS 453, 1961-1979
- Falkland Islands. Scale 1:643000 Map. DOS 906. Edition 3-OS, 1998
- Map 500k--xm20-4. 1:500000 map of Weddell Island and part of West Falkland. Russian Army Maps (for the world)
- Approaches to the Falkland Islands. Scale 1:1500000 chart. Gps Nautical Charts, 2010
- Illustrated Map of Weddell Island
