= Loop Head, Weddell Island =

Location in the Falkland Islands

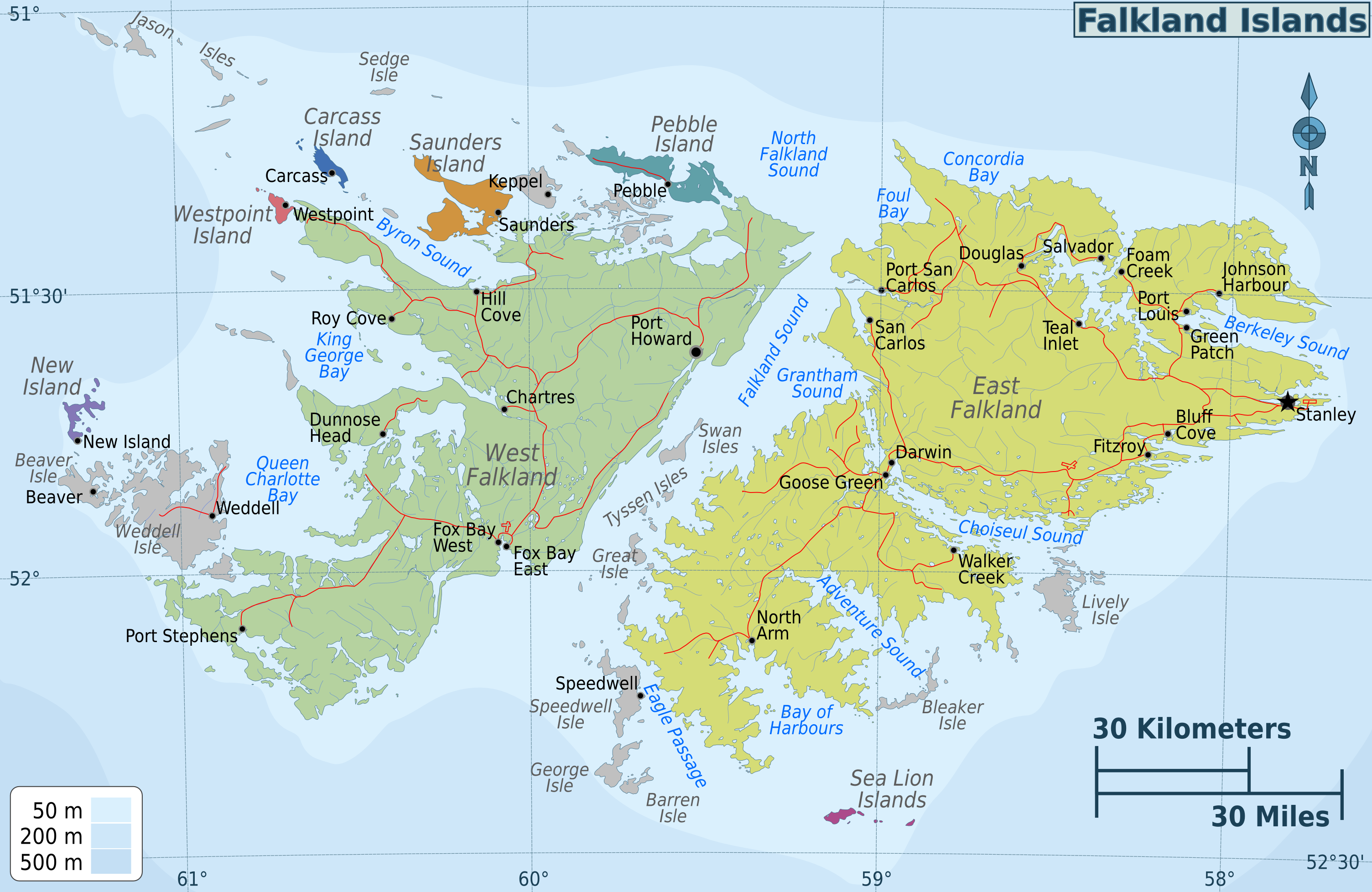
Location of Weddell Island in the Falkland Islands

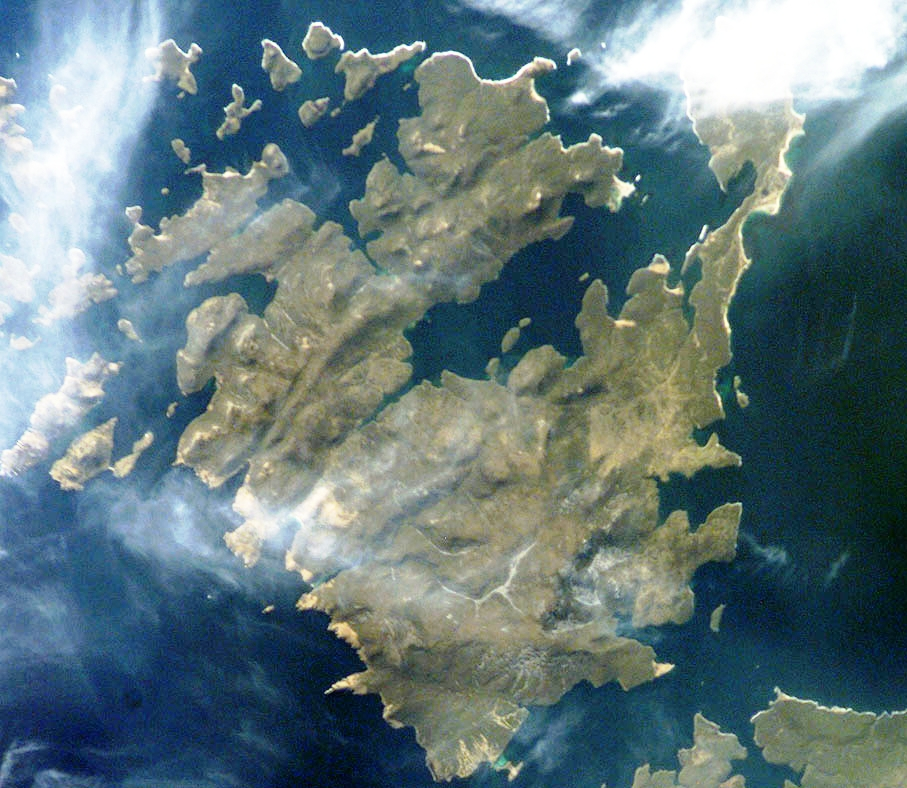
Satellite image of Weddell Island

Loop Head is the point on the east side of the entrance to Chatham Harbour in Weddell Island, Falkland Islands. It is located at 51°45′48″S 60°53′49″W, which is 2.4 kilometres (1.5 mi) west of Swan Point and 5.5 kilometres (3.4 mi) east-northeast of Beacon Point.

== Nature ==
Loop Head is home of a nature reserve, which is accessible to the public through tours. The nature reserve includes marine mammals such as sea lions and elephant seals, as well as Gentoo and Magellanic penguins, which come ashore onto the tussac grass. A 3.5 kilometre coastal tussac restoration program was launched in September 2017. Whales and dolphins can be visible from the shoreline from January to April. At the easternmost tip of Loop Head is a Sea Lion colony.

== Man-made structures ==
Loop Head is home to an old shanty, which was visited by New Zealand explorer Gerry Clark and his crew in June 1984. It is a leftover structure from when Weddell Island was a working sheep farm, with Loop Head once set aside for ewe clock and lamb rearing.

== Maps ==
- The Falkland Islands. Scale 1:401280 map. London: Edward Stanford, 1901
- Falkland Islands Explorer Map. Scale 1:365000. Ocean Explorer Maps, 2007
- Falklands Topographic Map Series. Scale 1:50000, 29 sheets. DOS 453, 1961-1979
- Falkland Islands. Scale 1:643000 Map. DOS 906. Edition 3-OS, 1998
- Map 500k--xm20-4. 1:500000 map of Weddell Island and part of West Falkland. Russian Army Maps (for the world)
- Approaches to the Falkland Islands. Scale 1:1500000 chart. Gps Nautical Charts, 2010
- Illustrated Map of Weddell Island

== Gallery ==
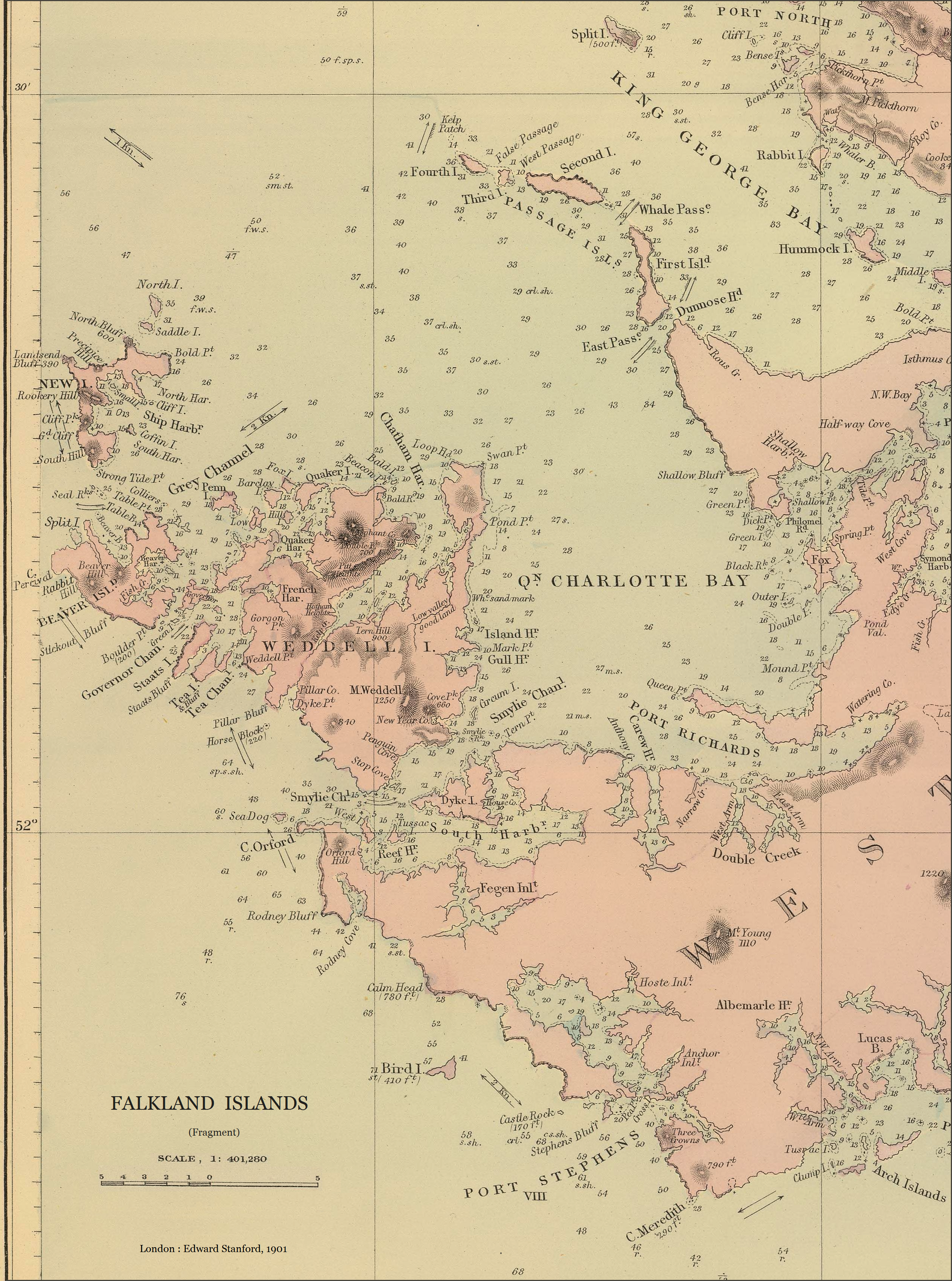
Old map of Weddell Island featuring Loop Head

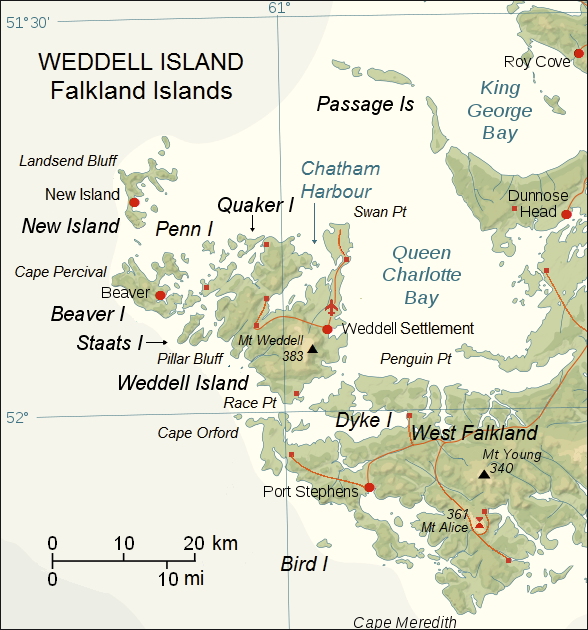
Map of Weddell Island
