= Swan Point, Weddell Island =

Headland of the Falkland Islands

Coordinates: 51°45′52″S 60°51′55″W

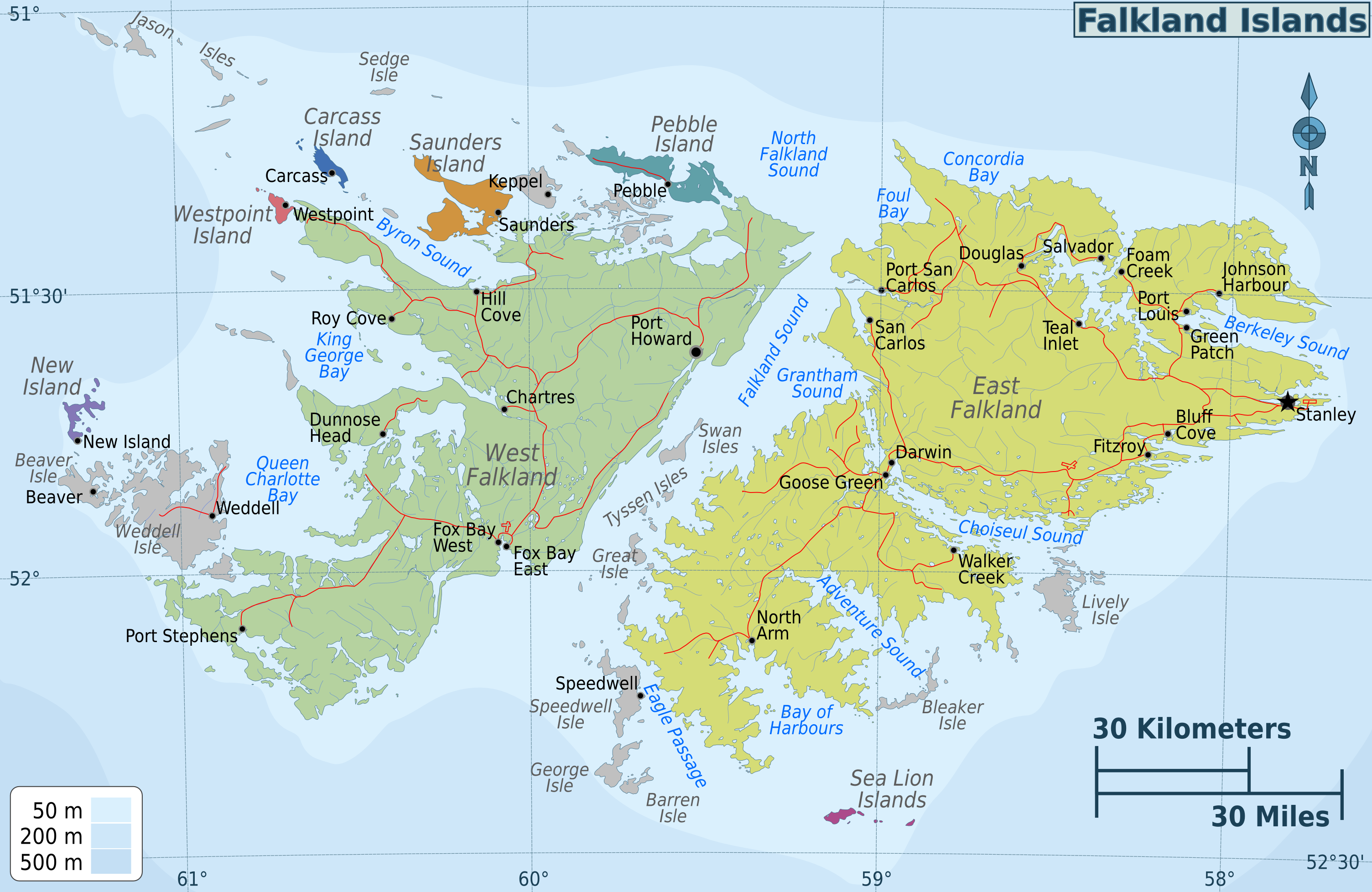
Location of Weddell Island in the Falkland Islands

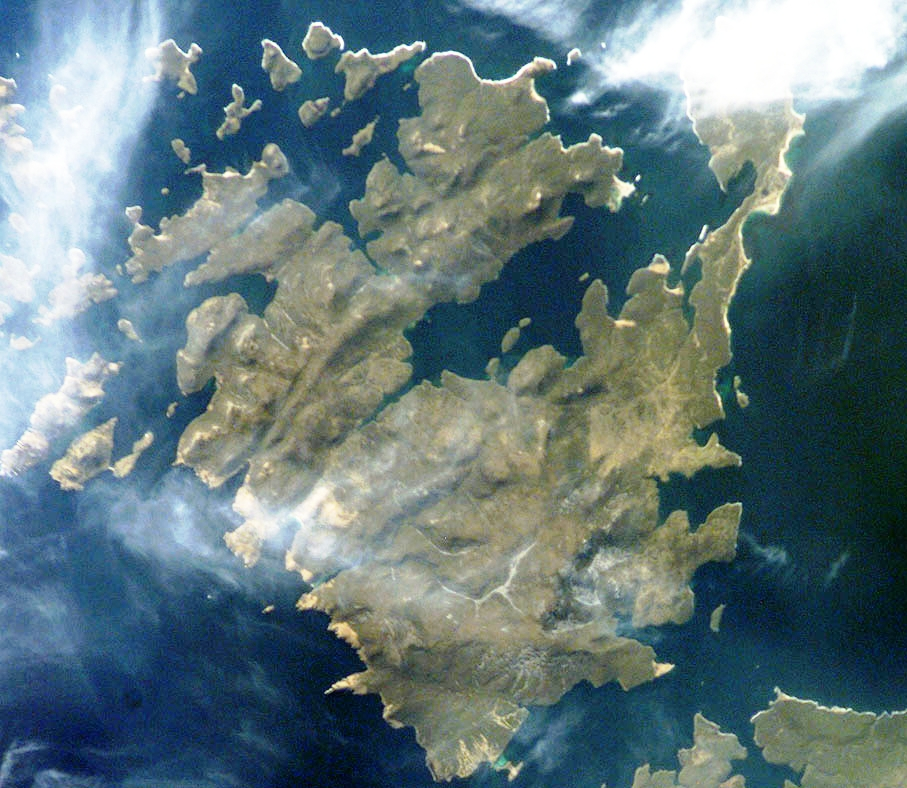
Satellite image of Weddell Island

Swan Point (Spanish: Punta Swan, Punta del Caballo) is the point on the southwest side of the entrance to Queen Charlotte Bay, forming the northeast extremity of Weddell Island in the Falkland Islands.

The point is located at, which is 26.7 kilometres (16.6 mi) north-northeast of Race Point, 2.4 kilometres (1.5 mi) east of Loop Head and 17 kilometres (11 mi) southwest of Dunnose Head, West Falkland.

Swan Island was an early name of Weddell Island.

== Maps ==
- The Falkland Islands. Scale 1:401280 map. London: Edward Stanford, 1901
- Falkland Islands Explorer Map. Scale 1:365000. Ocean Explorer Maps, 2007
- Falklands Topographic Map Series. Scale 1:50000, 29 sheets. DOS 453, 1961–1979
- Falkland Islands. Scale 1:643000 Map. DOS 906. Edition 3-OS, 1998
- Map 500k--xm20-4. 1:500000 map of Weddell Island and part of West Falkland. Russian Army Maps (for the world)
- Approaches to the Falkland Islands. Scale 1:1500000 chart. Gps Nautical Charts, 2010
- Illustrated Map of Weddell Island

== Gallery ==
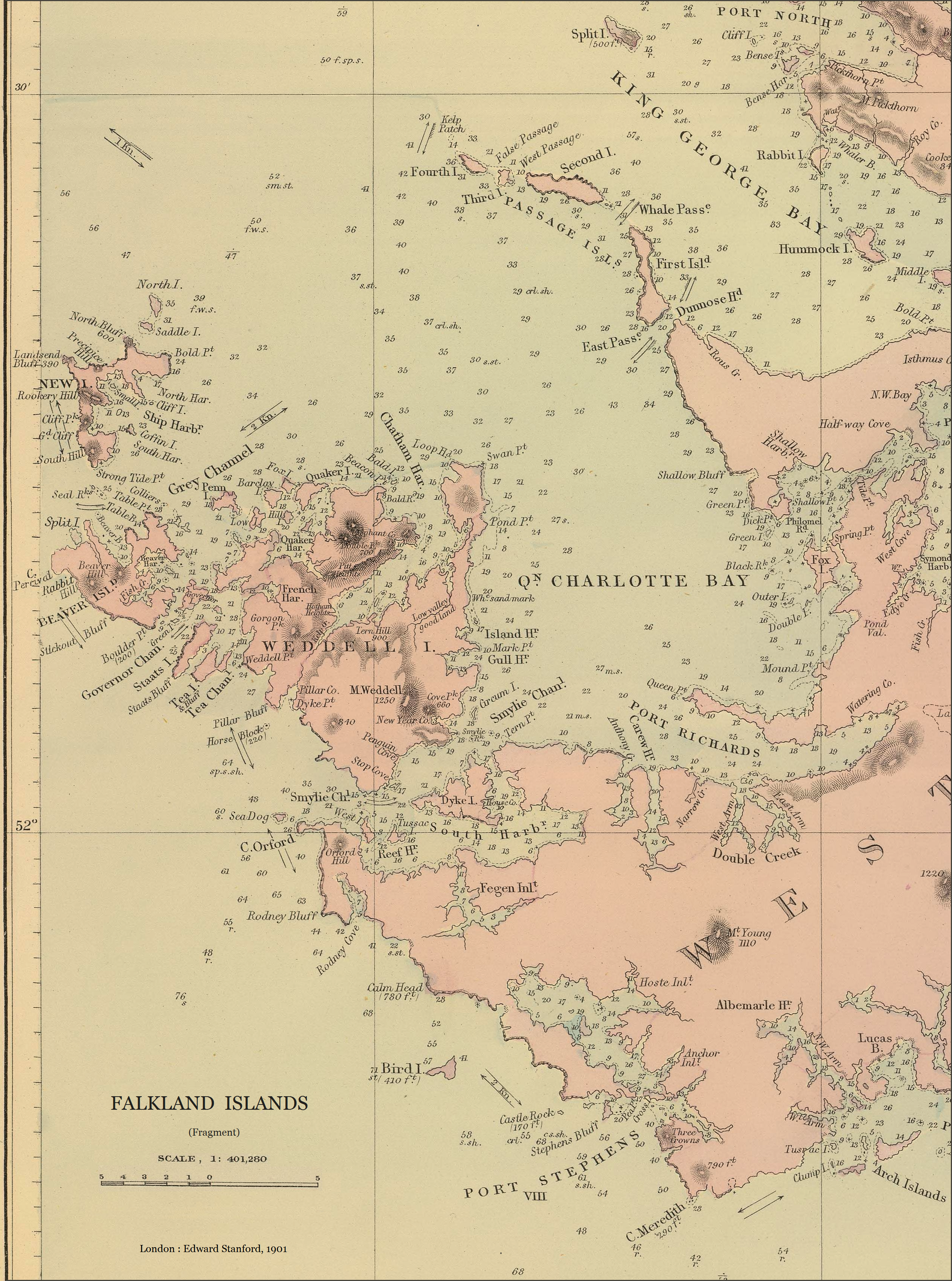
Old map of Weddell Island featuring Swan Point

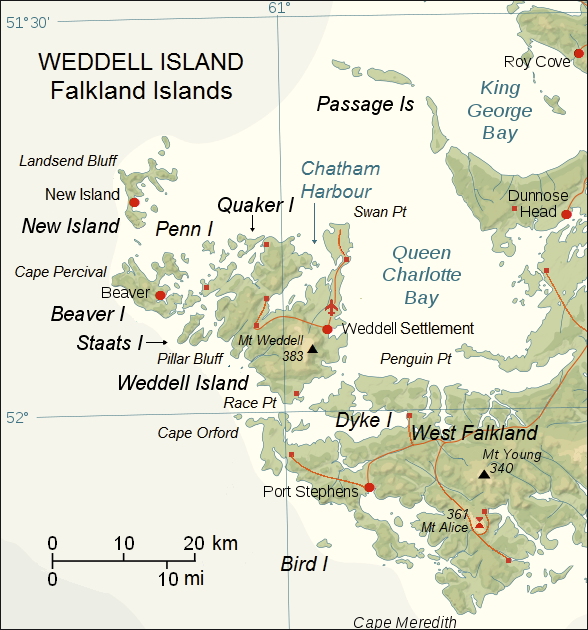
Map of Weddell Island
