= Gull Harbour =

Mountain in the Falkland Islands

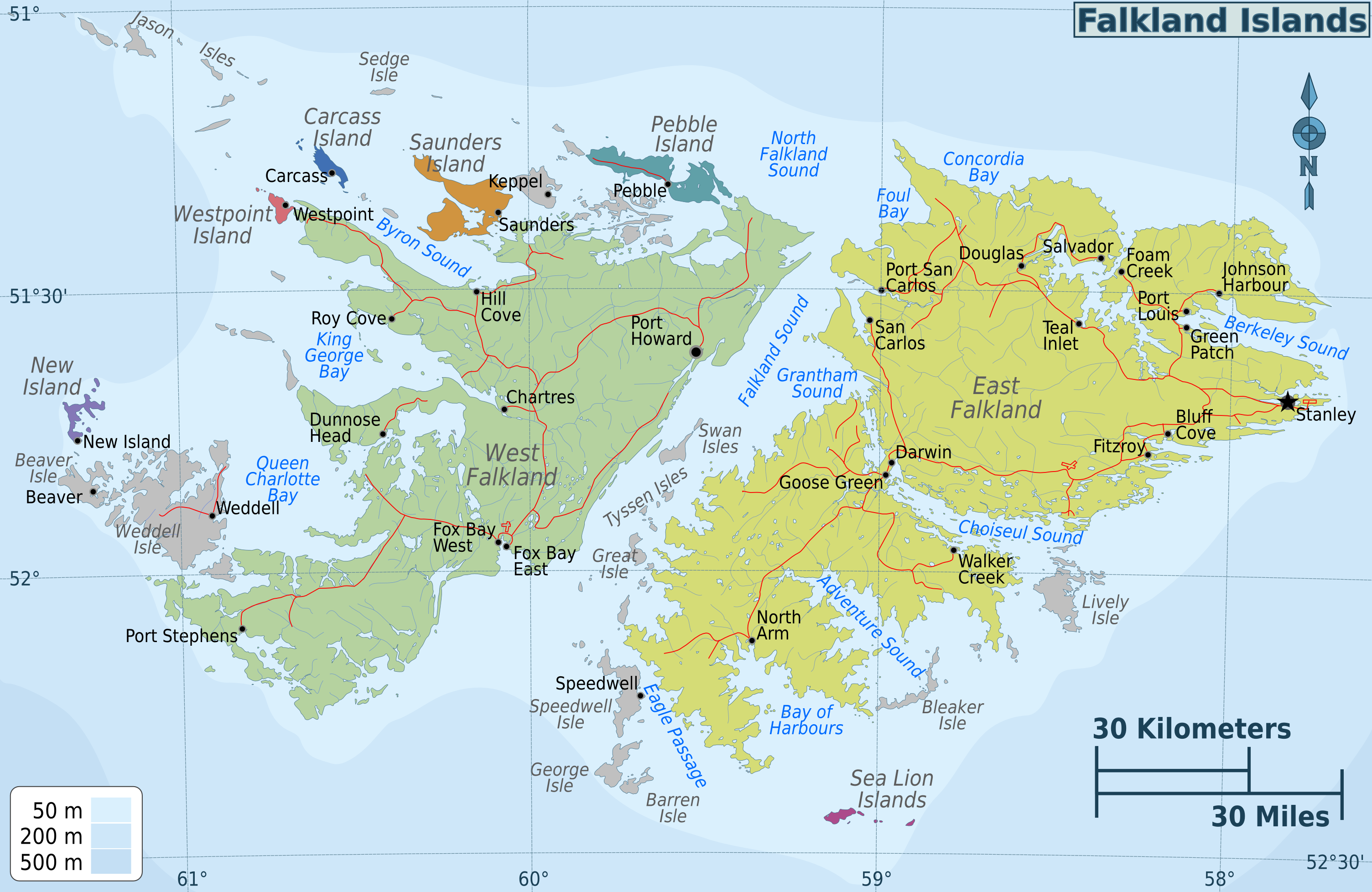
Location of Weddell Island in the Falkland Islands

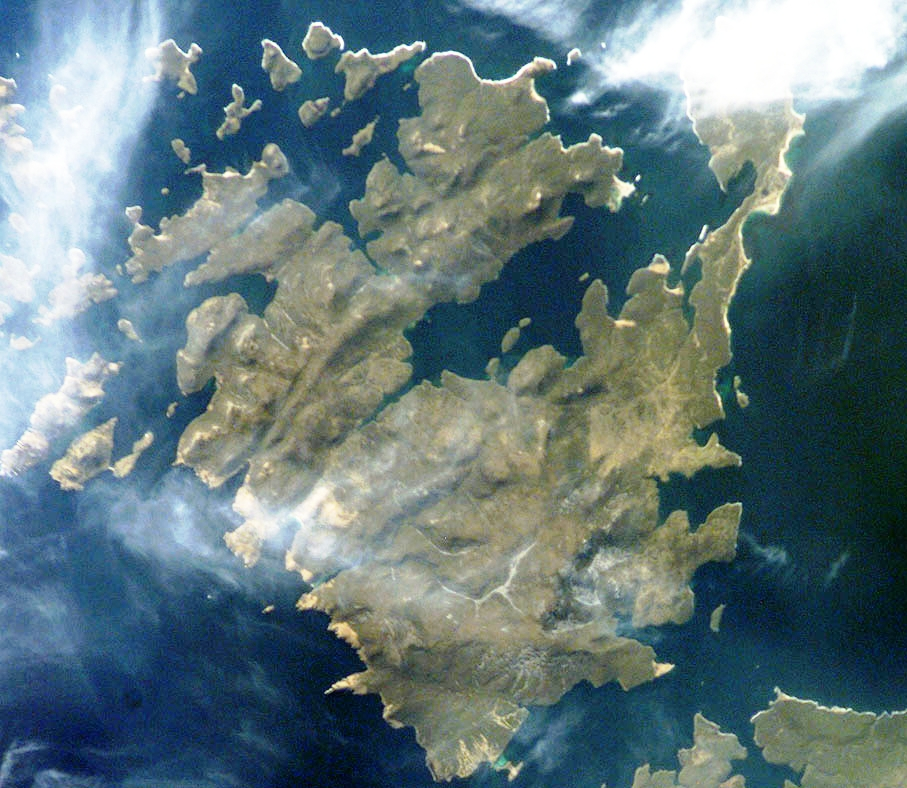
Satellite image of Weddell Island

Gull Harbour (former names States Harbour, Great Harbour) is the 1.3 km wide bay indenting for 2.8 km the east coast of Weddell Island in the Falkland Islands. It is entered north of Gull Point and south of Mark Point, and is centred at 51°53′56″S 60°53′20″W. The principal settlement of the island, Weddell Settlement, is situated at the head of the bay. Until the mid-nineteenth century Gull Harbour was known as Great Harbour.

== Maps ==
- The Falkland Islands. Scale 1:401280 map. London: Edward Stanford, 1901
- Falkland Islands Explorer Map. Scale 1:365000. Ocean Explorer Maps, 2007
- Falklands Topographic Map Series. Scale 1:50000, 29 sheets. DOS 453, 1961-1979
- Falkland Islands. Scale 1:643000 Map. DOS 906. Edition 3-OS, 1998
- Map 500k--xm20-4. 1:500000 map of Weddell Island and part of West Falkland. Russian Army Maps (for the world)
- Approaches to the Falkland Islands. Scale 1:1500000 chart. Gps Nautical Charts, 2010
- Illustrated Map of Weddell Island

== Gallery ==
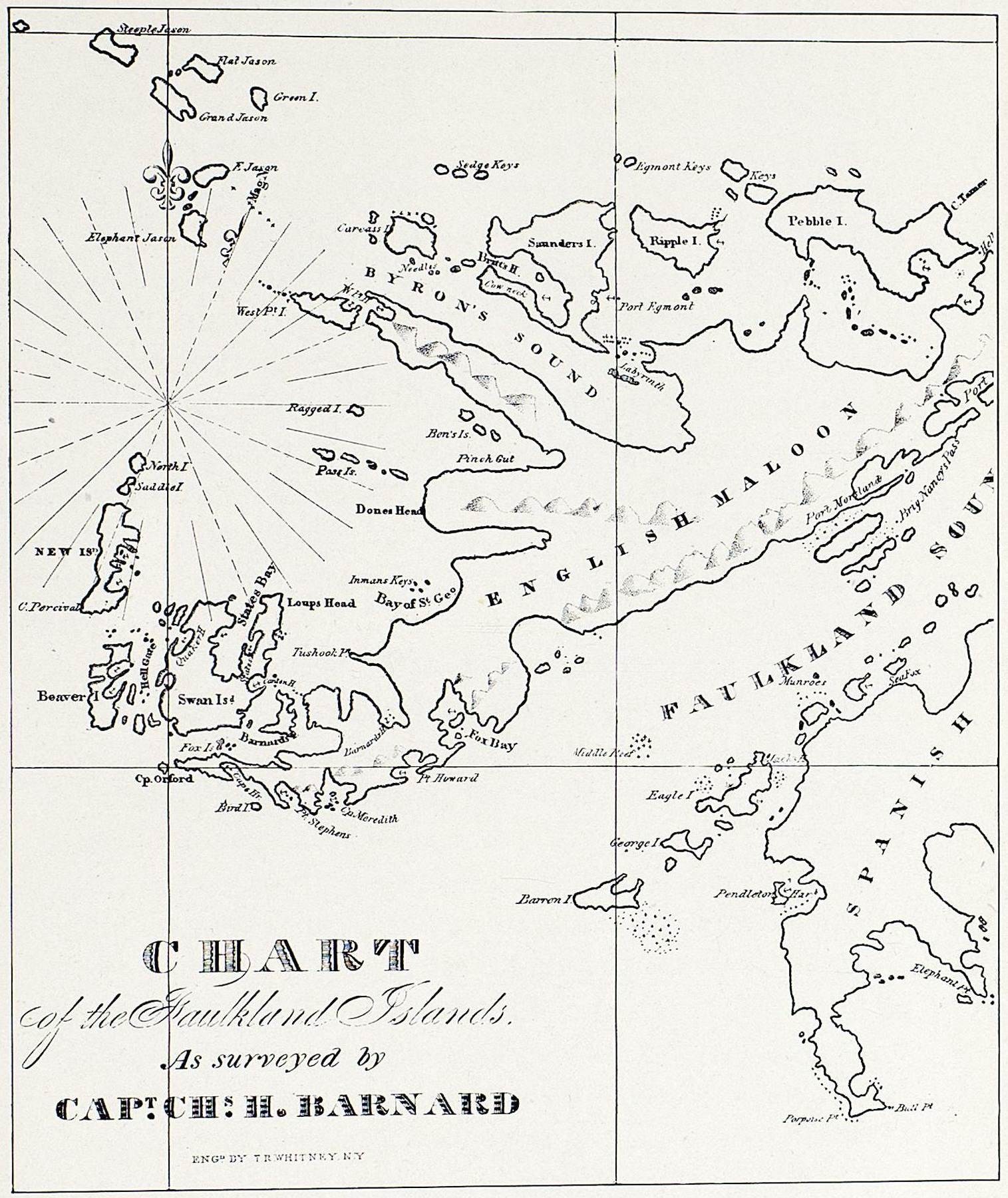
States Bay, States Harbour, Canton Harbour and Swan Island (present Chatham Harbour, States Cove, Gull Harbour and Weddell Island) on a pre 1829 Falklands map by Charles Barnard

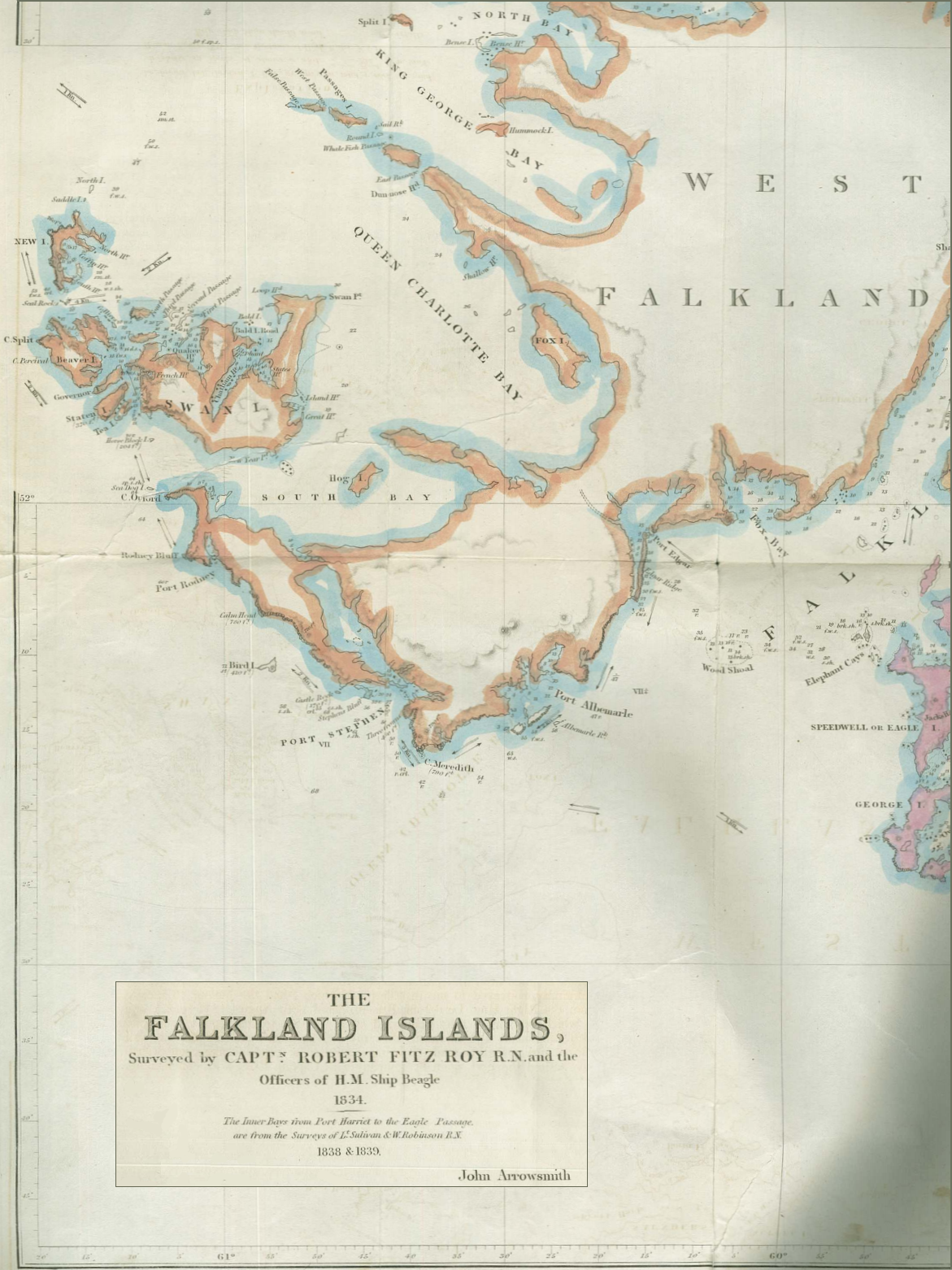
1841 Falkland Islands map by John Arrowsmith, fragment featuring Swan Island, States Harbour and Great Harbour (present Weddell Island, States Cove and Gull Harbour)

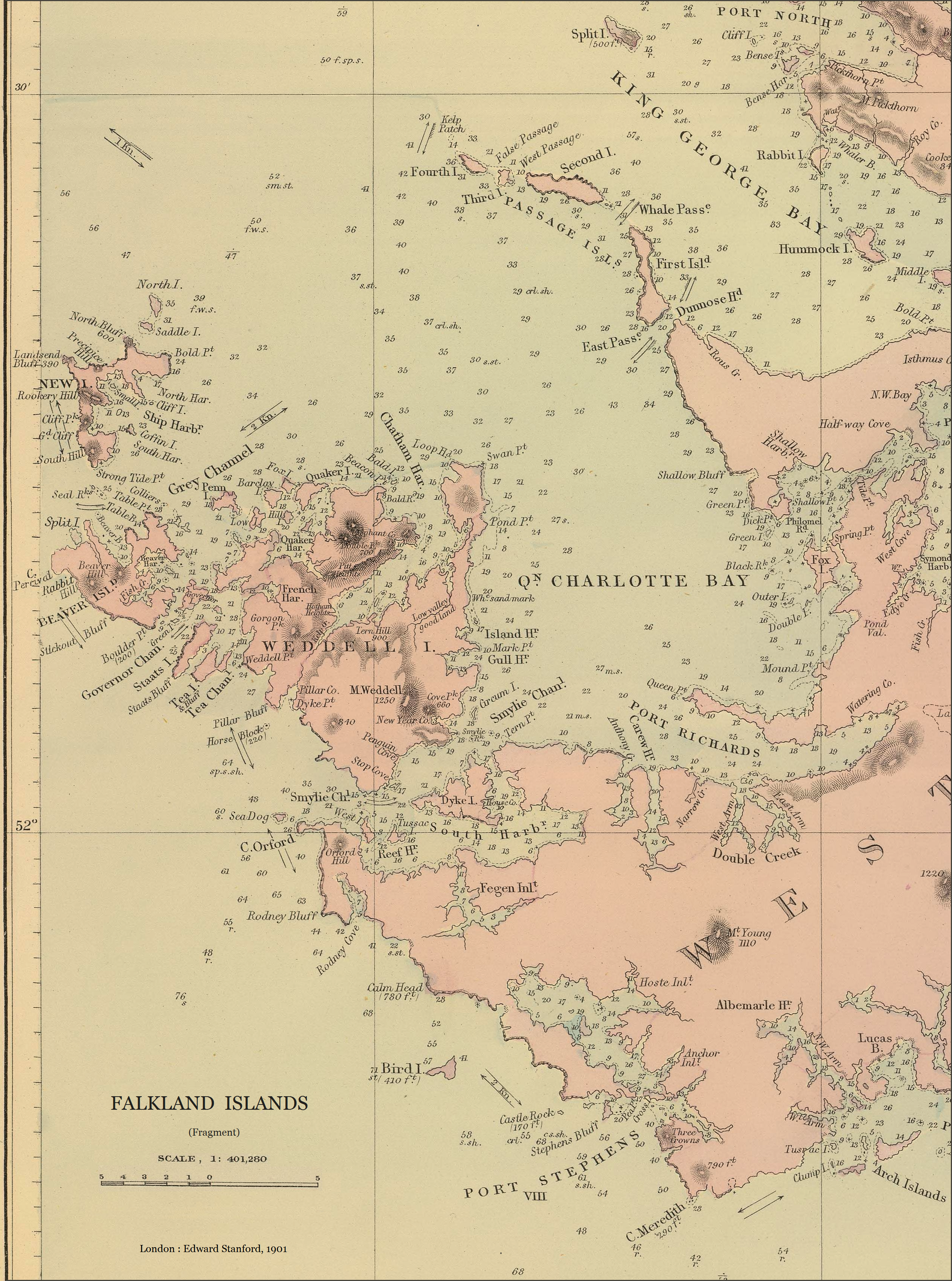
Old map of Weddell Island featuring Gull Harbour

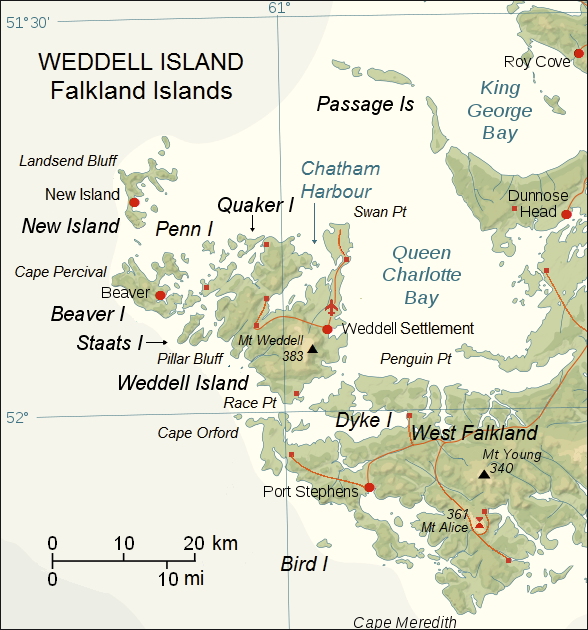
Map of Weddell Island
