= New Year Cove =

Bay in the Falkland Islands

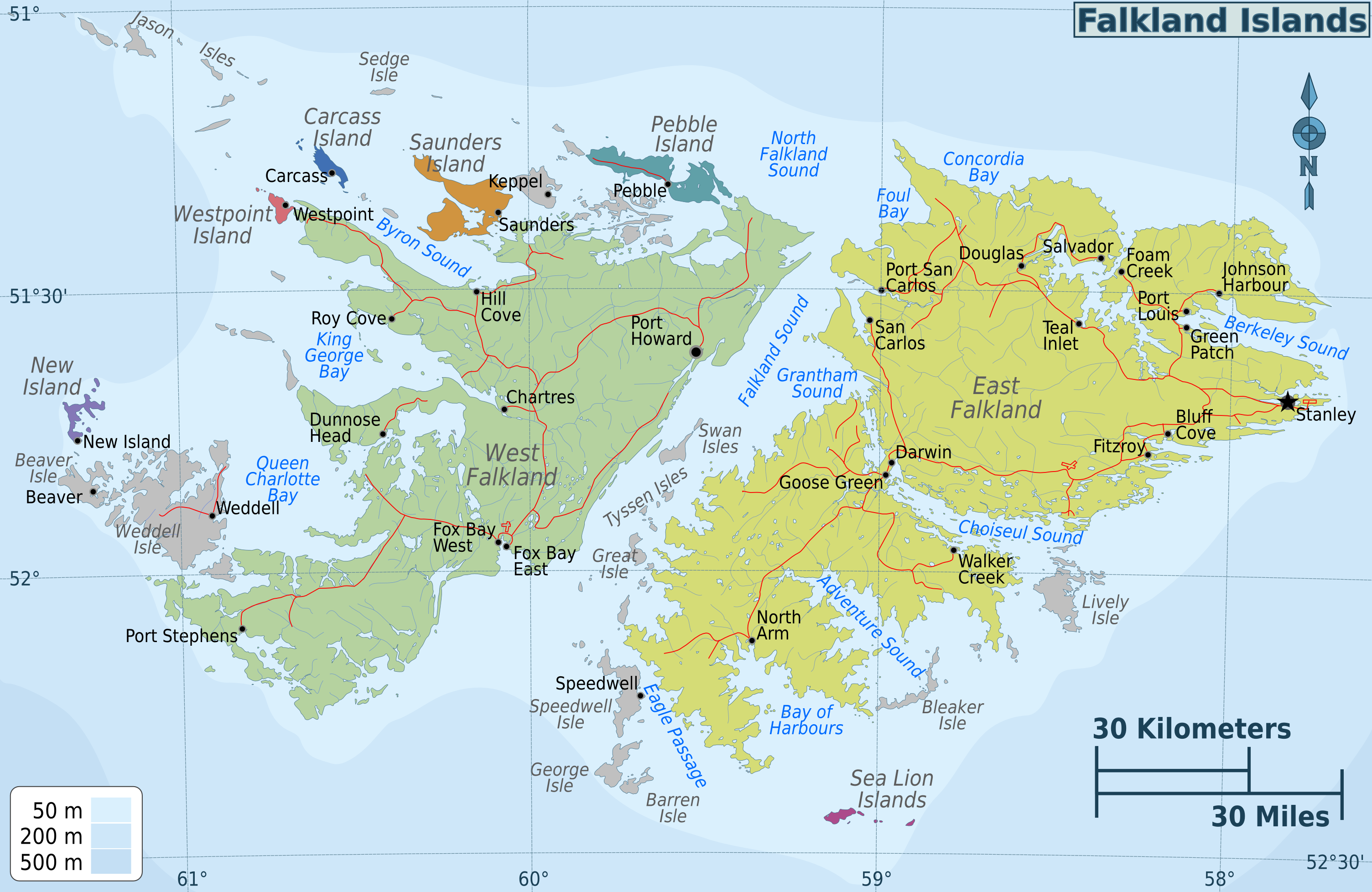
Location of Weddell Island in the Falkland Islands

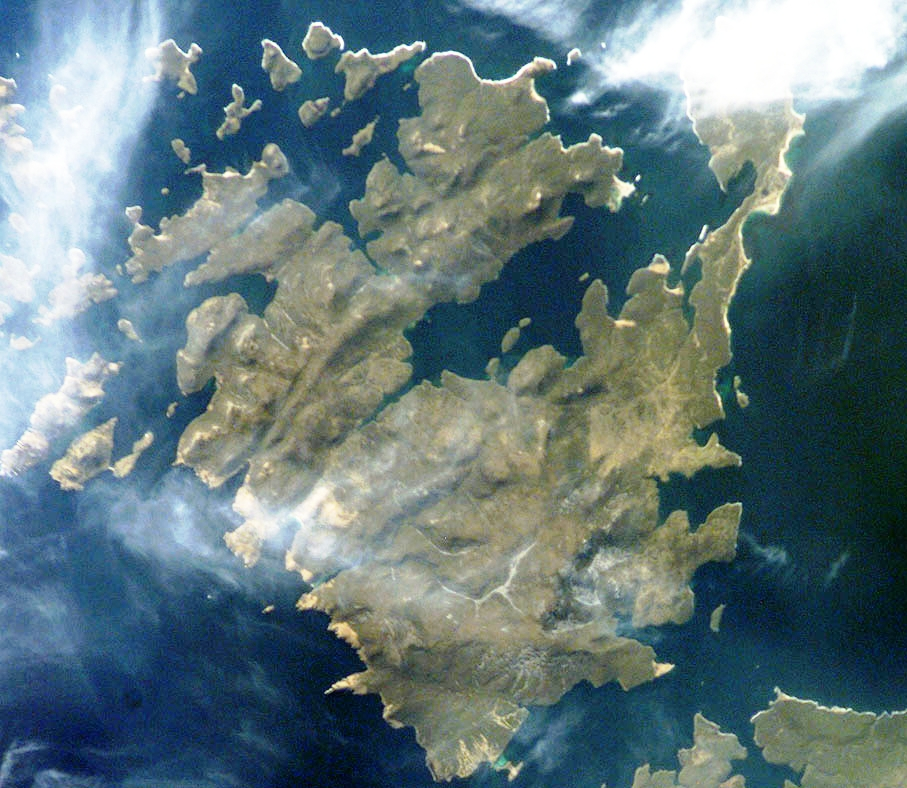
Satellite image of Weddell Island

New Year Cove is the 1.7 km wide bay indenting for 2.45 km the southeast coast of Weddell Island in the Falkland Islands. It is entered north of Hadassah Point and south of Circum Point and centred at 51°56′30″S 60°54′30″W.

== Maps ==
- The Falkland Islands. Scale 1:401280 map. London: Edward Stanford, 1901
- Falkland Islands Explorer Map. Scale 1:365000. Ocean Explorer Maps, 2007
- Falklands Topographic Map Series. Scale 1:50000, 29 sheets. DOS 453, 1961-1979
- Falkland Islands. Scale 1:643000 Map. DOS 906. Edition 3-OS, 1998
- Map 500k--xm20-4. 1:500000 map of Weddell Island and part of West Falkland. Russian Army Maps (for the world)
- Approaches to the Falkland Islands. Scale 1:1500000 chart. Gps Nautical Charts, 2010
- Illustrated Map of Weddell Island

== Gallery ==
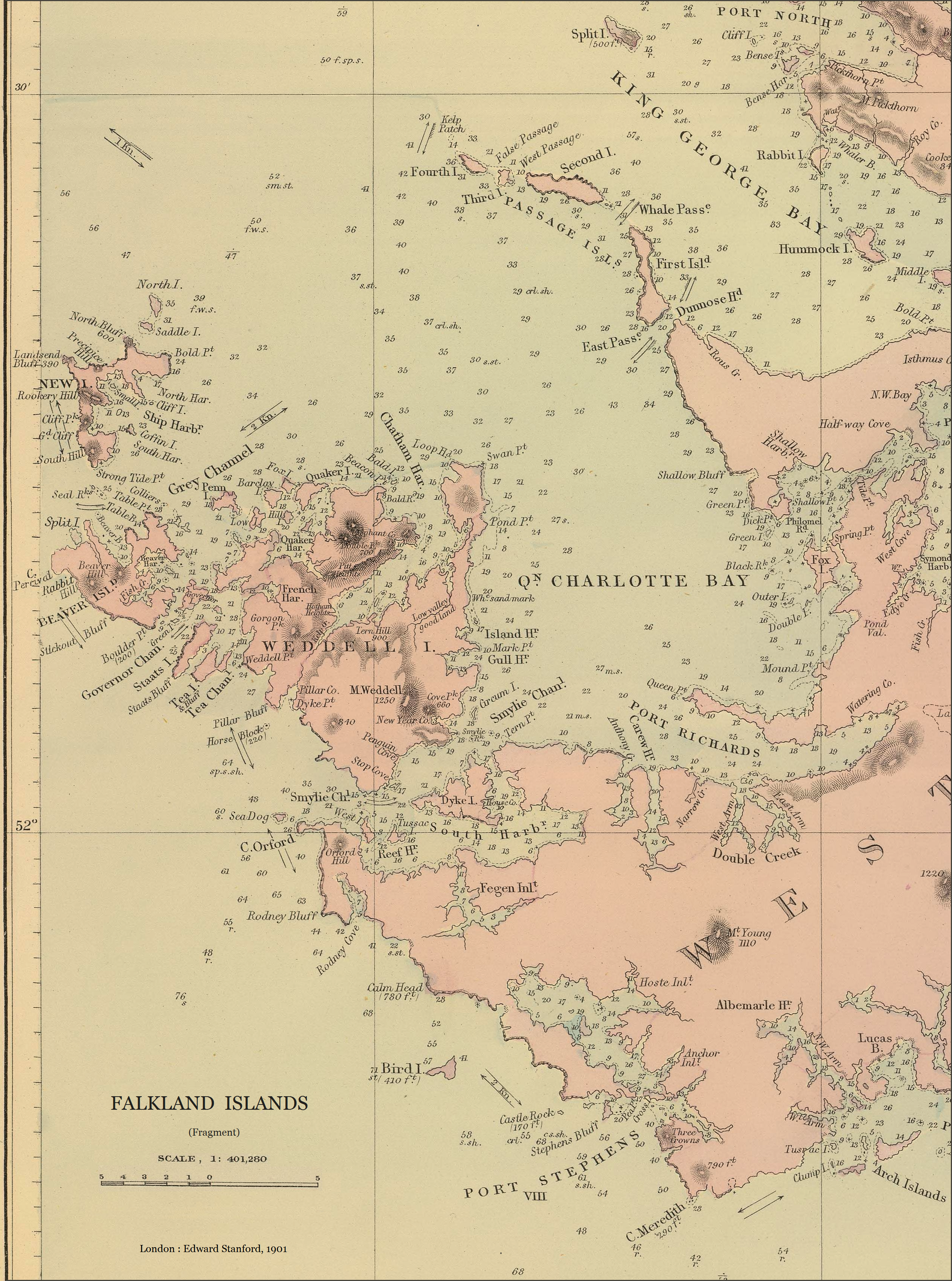
Old map of Weddell Island featuring French Harbour

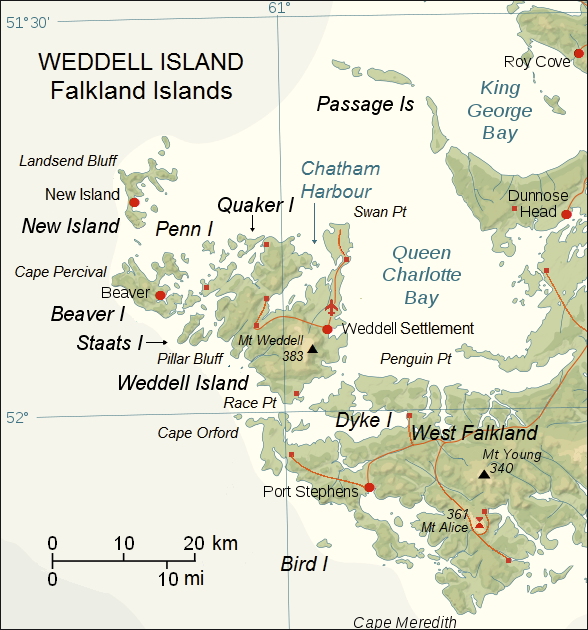
Map of Weddell Island
