= Dyke Island =

- Island
- Dyke Island shown within the Falkland Islands
- Coordinates: 51°59′16″S 60°52′49″W
- Country: Falkland Islands
- Time zone: UTC−3 (FKST)
- If shown, area and population ranks are for all islands and all inhabited islands in the Falklands respectively.

Dyke Island (former name Barnards Island) is one of the Falkland Islands, lying between Weddell Island, and West Falkland. The channel running between it and Weddell Island is called Smylie Channel.
