= Weddell Island =

Island in the Falkland Islands

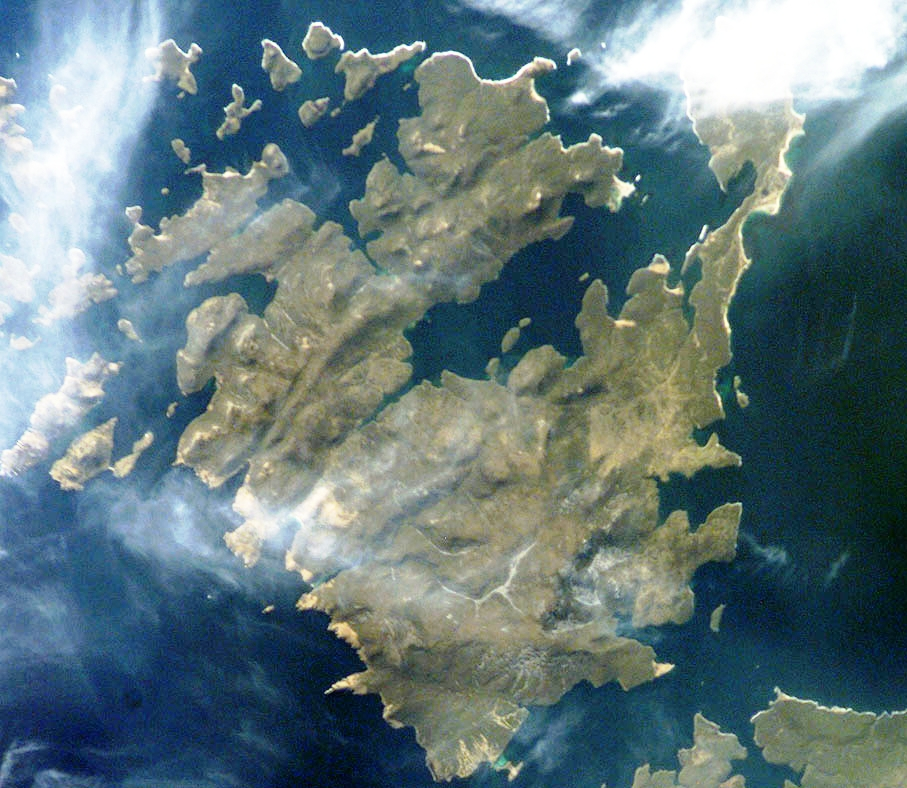
- Satellite image of Weddell Island

- Location within Falkland Islands Location within Atlantic Ocean
- Etymology: Named after James Weddell

Geography
- Location: South Atlantic Ocean
- Coordinates: 51°52′43″S 61°00′24″W
- Archipelago: Falklands Archipelago; Weddell Island Group
- Total islands: 23
- Major islands: Weddell, Bald, Barclay, Carthorse, Circum, Fox, Hill, Low, Penn, Pitt, Quaker
- Area: 265.8 km^{2} (102.6 sq mi)
- Length: 26.8 km (16.65 mi)
- Width: 22.4 km (13.92 mi)
- Coastline: 175.7 km (109.17 mi)
- Highest elevation: 383 m (1257 ft)
- Highest point: Mount Weddell

Administration
- Falkland Islands
- Constituency: Camp
- Statistical region: Outlying Islands
- Largest settlement: Weddell Settlement

Demographics
- Languages: English
- Ethnic groups: Falkland Islanders

Additional information
- Time zone: FKST (UTC−3)
- Official website: weddellisland.com

Weddell Island (Spanish: Isla San José) is one of the Falkland Islands in the South Atlantic, lying off the southwest extremity of West Falkland. It is situated 1,545 km (960 mi) west-northwest of South Georgia Island, 1,165 km (724 mi) north of Livingston Island, 606 km (377 mi) northeast of Cape Horn, 358 km (222 mi) northeast of Isla de los Estados, and 510 km (320 mi) east of the Atlantic entrance to Magellan Strait.

With an area of 265.8 km^{2} (102.6 mi^{2}) Weddell is the third largest island in the archipelago after East Falkland and West Falkland, and one of the largest private islands in the world. It has only one inhabited location, Weddell Settlement, with a single digit population engaged in sheep farming and tourism services. The island offers walks to wildlife watching sites and scenery destinations including some spectacular landscapes featuring the famous Falklands stone runs. Weddell is both an Important Plant Area and a priority Key Biodiversity Area.

It is a remote place, infrequently visited by a resupply ship and occasionally by private yachts, accessible by air with a short (some 200 km (120 mi)) if expensive flight from the Falklands capital, Stanley.

== Etymology ==
Until the mid-nineteenth century Weddell Island was known as Swan Island, a name of unknown derivation recorded as early as 1785 by Capt. George Dixon, a seasoned mariner who had sailed under James Cook. Amused by this particular name and the Falklands place naming in general, he wrote: Though these islands are universally known by the name of Falkland’s, yet many of them are called by different names, just, I presume, as the fancy of different cruisers have suggested; I just mention this circumstance to prevent thy surprise, on seeing such names as Swan Island, Keppel’s Island &c &c. That former name is not to be confused with Swan Island in the Falkland Sound, on the other side of West Falkland.

Possibly, the island might have been named after a native bird, the Black-necked swan. The name appeared, applied to Weddell and/or Staats and Tea Islands, and translated as ‘Island(s) of Swans’ (Île(s) des Cygnes or Islas de los Cisnes) on some French and Spanish maps.

The present name of the island comes from James Weddell, a British sealer and explorer who visited the Falklands in 1819–1824, overwintered once in 1820, and then a second time in May–September 1823 ashore on the island at Quaker Harbour. Weddell's book A Voyage Towards the South Pole documented, inter alia, certain events and persons of local history, including his running across the privateer David Jewett and the former castaway Charles Barnard. He is well known for his voyages to the Antarctic, and the Weddell seal and the geographic features Weddell Point and Weddell Glacier on South Georgia, and Weddell Sea (discovered by him in February 1823), Weddell Plain, Weddell Arm, Weddell Islands (name given by Weddell himself) and Weddell Lake in Antarctica are all named in association with him.

== History ==
=== Discovery ===
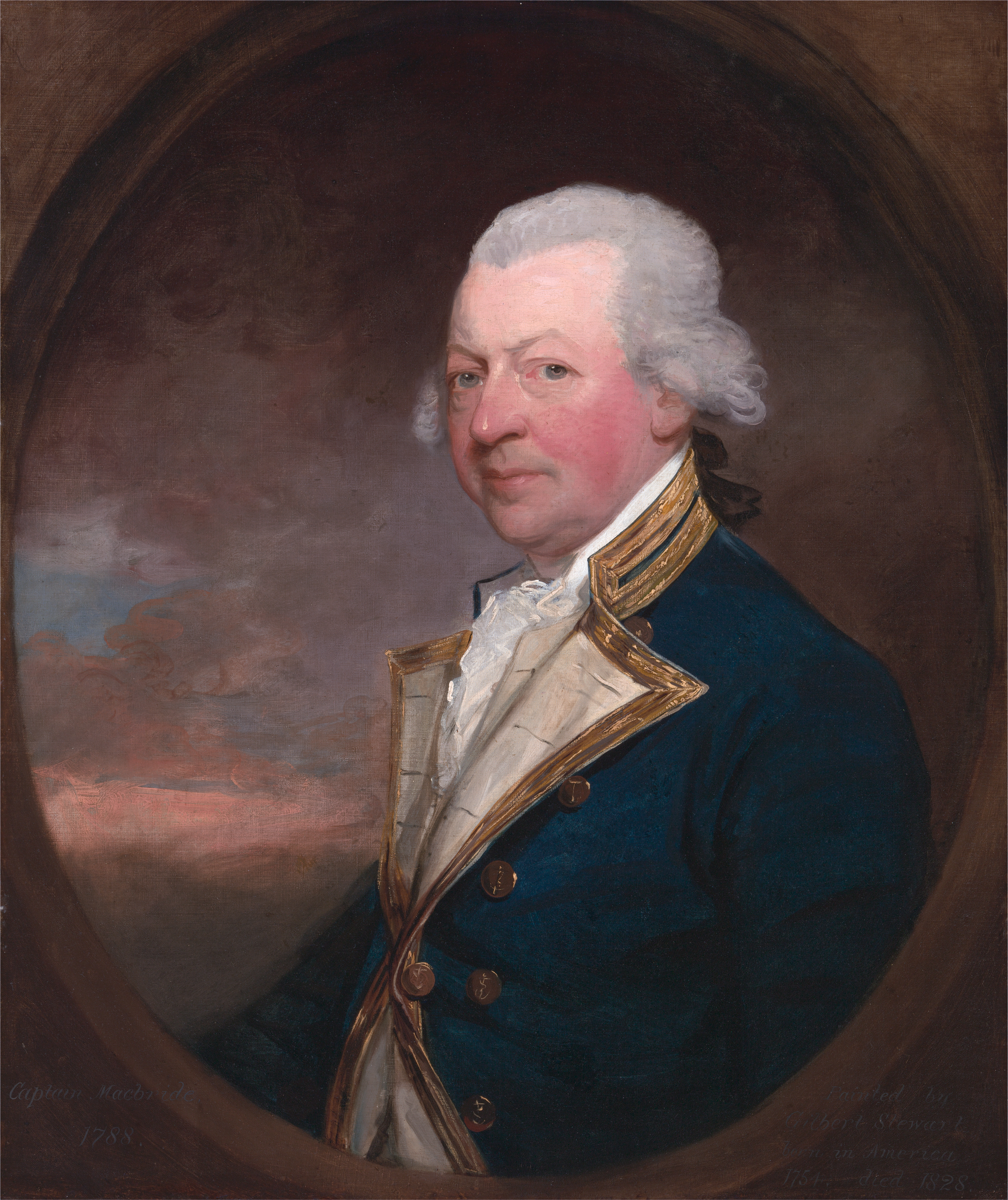
Capt. John MacBride, the discoverer of Weddell Island; portrait by Gilbert Stuart, 1788

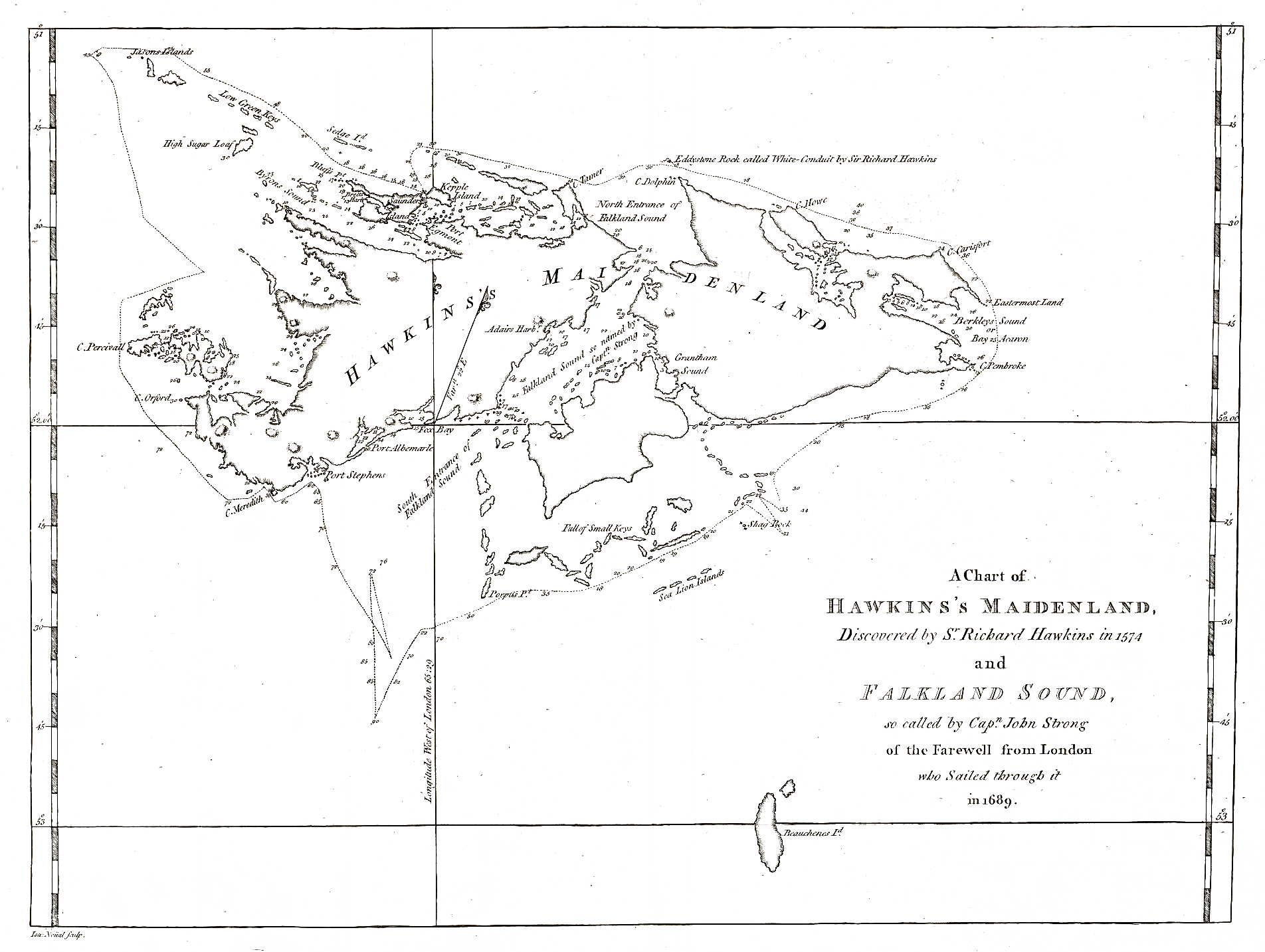
MacBride's chart featuring Weddell Island (nameless); the ship track depicted is that of HMS Jason in 1766

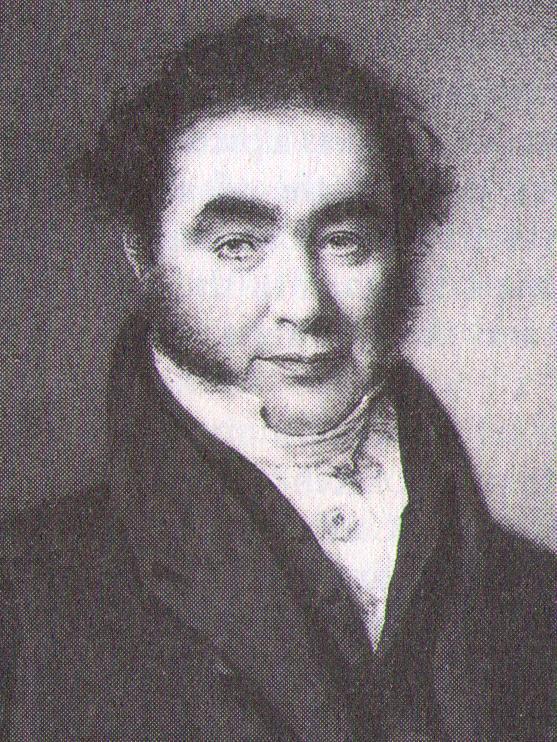
Weddell Island is named after James Weddell

The island was discovered in 1766 by the British navigator and accomplished military commander John MacBride during the first hydrographic survey of the Falklands archipelago carried out by his ship HMS Jason out of Port Egmont, the early British settlement situated on Saunders Island off the northwest coast of West Falkland. Of his new discoveries Capt. MacBride wrote unfavourably: We found a mass of islands and broken lands, beaten by storms almost perpetual. His temperature records for the area were more agreeable though. In January and February the thermometer rose to 59 °F (15 °C), but no higher; in August, it once fell to 20 °F (−7 °C), but was seldom lower than 32 °F (0 °C). As a result of that survey Weddell Island appeared on MacBride's chart of the Falklands, one of the most accurate for its time. Capt. James Cook, who surveyed and mapped South Georgia but did not visit the Falklands, based his 1777 chart of the islands on MacBride's one, inheriting some of its specific characteristics. For instance, both charts fail to show the secluded bay of Port Stephens, applying its name to present Port Albemarle instead.

Judging from contemporaneous mapping, the island was unknown to the French who established the first Falklands settlement, Port St. Louis in 1764.

The first Spanish sighting of Weddell Island was made by Miguel de Bernasani and Lieut. Francisco Orduña, from Port Stephens area, in the course of their overland trip across West Falkland in April 1769 (April 1768 according to other sources). Following a survey of the island and its principal embayment Chatham Harbour carried out by Capt. Manuel Pando in the ship San Francisco de Paula in July 1770, Weddell appeared on the map made by the ship's pilot Joseph Puig (and widely copied by other Spanish cartographers) together with Beaver and New Islands, the group denoted as Yslas de San Miguel. Puig, a Catalan, named the large bay Puerto de San Joseph after his own name saint, which name was subsequently applied to the island itself and Hispanicized to Isla San José. Such naming practices were not uncommon at the time, indeed San Miguel was Bernasani's name saint, while Port St. Louis honoured the name saint of the French navigator Louis Antoine de Bougainville.

=== Early history ===
The early inhabitants of the island were seal hunters. While some seal skins were taken from the Falklands by Bougainville in 1764, a large scale sealing industry was only developed since the 1770s by American and British sealers who frequented Weddell and nearby islands in the process. The first to bring their sealing vessels to the Falklands were probably Capts. Gamaliel Collins, David Smith and Greenwood from New England in 1774. Due to the nature of their trade, the sealers used to spend extensive periods of time ashore, and sometimes overwintered. So did Capt. Greenwood in his vessel King George at Port Egmont in 1774, and the British sealer United States under Capt. Benjamin Hussey in 1785 in Hussey Harbour – probably the estuary States Harbour on the southeast side of States Bay (current names States Cove and Chatham Harbour respectively). On the local conditions for survival, American sealer Edmund Fanning reviewed the available sources of food and fuel to conclude in his memoirs: In fact, a person would be able to subsist at the Falkland Islands for a considerable length of time, without experiencing any great degree of suffering. As a reminder of that period, many place names in the Weddell Island area honour sealers and sealing vessels, mostly American.

The sealers favoured Weddell and nearby Beaver Island and New Island as a base for their operations in the Falklands and South Georgia on several grounds. First, the islands offered a number of excellent harbours providing shelter against sudden westerly gales. Second, the sealers preferred to keep some distance away from the Spanish settlement of Puerto Soledad (present Port Louis) situated at the opposite extremity of the archipelago, about 175 nmi (324 km) away by sea. Spain was hostile, regarding sealer presence and activities as a challenge to its sovereignty claim of the Falklands. Nevertheless, the Spaniards refrained from using force against the sealers, and following the abandonment of Puerto Soledad in 1811, sealer presence spread throughout the Falklands. Finally, with the discovery of Livingston Island and other territories south of 60° south latitude in 1819, the location of the Falklands’ southwesternmost islands made them the ideal staging post for a final southbound 540 nmi (1,000 km) sailing leg to the new hunting grounds in Antarctica, with an occasional stopover at Staten Island (present Isla de los Estados) for the provision of necessary timber unavailable on the Falklands.

The Americans came to regard the Falklands seal fisheries as their traditional industry pursued freely since before the American Revolution, and did not hesitate to deploy the US Navy in protection of that industry from an Argentine attempt to curb American seal hunting by force in 1831. That ill-conceived attempt had long-lasting implications for the future of the islands, paving the way to a reassertion of British sovereignty over the Falkland Islands in 1833.

=== A Robinson Crusoe mise-en-scène ===
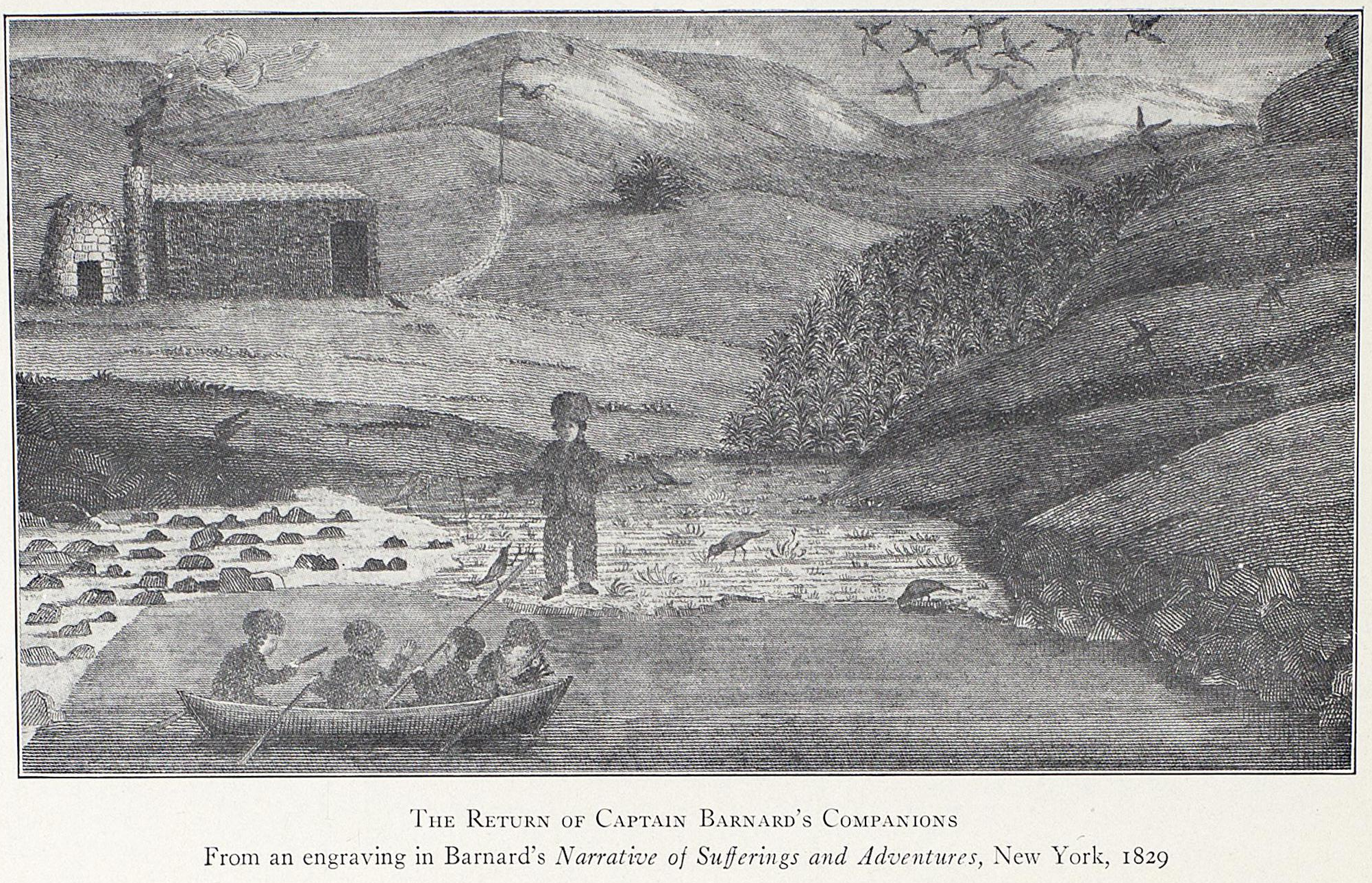
Capt. Barnard, his companions and their boat in front of their stone built hut on New Island, December 1813; the left side beach is occupied by a seal colony

In a famous Robinson Crusoe-like episode of Falklands history, American sealer Capt. Charles Barnard got marooned in the area from 11 June 1813 to 25 November 1814, together with four sailors – Jacob Green (American), and Joseph Albrook, James Louder and Samuel Ansel (Britons), accompanied by the captain's most helpful dog named Cent, and in possession of a 6.6 m (22 ft) whaleboat. The castaways built several shelters on Weddell (Swan Island to them) while hunting feral hogs and collecting drift wood for subsistence. Under the circumstances, one of them, Ansel, developed an aggressive attitude and was temporarily exiled by his companions to survive alone at Quaker Harbour from 28 December 1813 to 16 February 1814. In the vicinity of his tussac-built bivouac, the graves and headstones of two men were found a mile up the bay who, Barnard reasoned, must have been buried long since, as the letters were almost effaced from the stones. Following his encounter with James Weddell on New Island in 1821, the latter popularized Barnard's castaway story by his book published in 1825. Certain inaccuracies in Weddell's retelling of events and his attempt at embellishing his compatriots’ motives for taking over Barnard's ship Nanina and claiming it as a prize of the War of 1812 (subsequently, Barnard appealed successfully against the London prize court judgement and got his ship restored to him), probably prompted the American to write his Narrative of Sufferings and Adventures book published in 1829.

Barnard would later become a prominent figure in the Antarctic seal fishery, and Barnard Point and Rotch Dome on Livingston Island in the South Shetland Islands are named after him and two other American pioneers of Falklands and Antarctic sealing, the brothers Francis and William Rotch. Barnard named two features in the vicinity of Weddell Island after himself – Barnard's Island and Barnard's Harbour, present Dyke Island and Carew Harbour respectively.

=== Falklands War ===
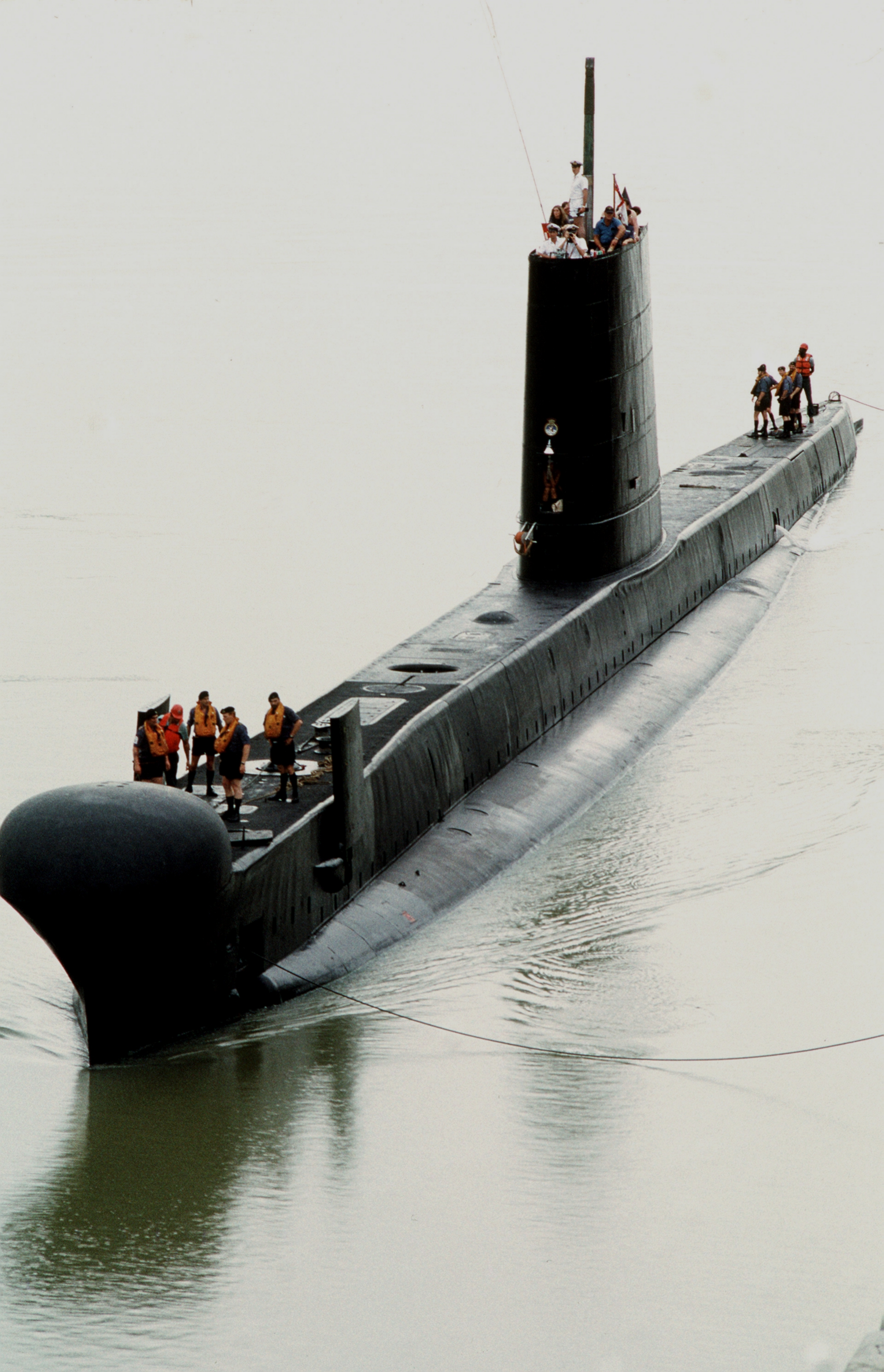
A sister ship of HMS Onyx

The island remained unoccupied by Argentine troops and virtually unaffected by military action during the 1982 Falklands War. In particular, neither land mines nor naval mines have been planted in the Weddell Island area, and indeed, anyplace west of Fox Bay, West Falkland.

On 5 June 1982, while en route from Falkland Sound to Chatham Harbour, the diesel-electric submarine HMS Onyx commanded by Lt. Cdr. Andrew Johnson – the only non nuclear powered Royal Navy sub to serve in the war – struck a pinnacle of rock off Cape Meredith at 150 feet (46 m) depth, which upon subsequent dry-dock examination at Portsmouth Naval Base turned out to have damaged two torpedo tubes and dangerously impacted one of the torpedoes. On the occasion, the submarine proceeded with the transportation of a six-member Special Boat Service detachment led by Lieut. David Boyd and Sgt. William Lewis to carry out reconnaissance of Weddell Island, take out any observation posts providing guidance for approaching enemy aircraft (none, it turned out), and insert a British team to send last minute warnings of the number and flight directions of inbound Argentine Air Force planes.

=== Shipwrecks and burials ===
Five vessels were reportedly lost in Weddell waters: the schooner Castalia dragged ashore in 1893, the pilot schooner Hadassah wrecked in Smylie Channel in 1896, the cutter Messenger dragged ashore in 1920, and the cutter Weddell sunk at Dyke Island whilst being towed to Weddell Island in 1939.

There is a total of sixteen recorded graves on the island, including the earliest two found by Barnard in 1813. Half of them are in the Weddell Settlement Cemetery, with the first one dated 1889. Some deaths had to do with the poor emergency medical aid available to such remote places in the past.

== Geography ==
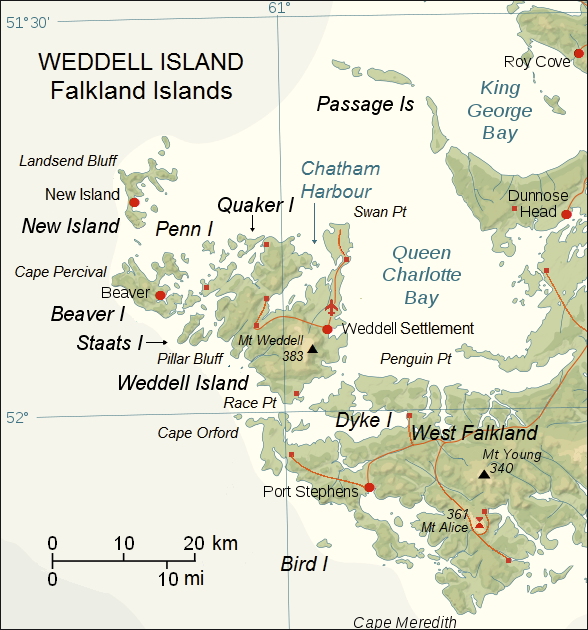
Map of the Weddell Island area featuring the island's airfield, roads and remote huts, and RRH Mount Alice station on West Falkland

Weddell Island is bounded by Queen Charlotte Bay on the east and Smylie Channel on the south, and is surrounded by a number of minor islands including Dyke Island to the southeast, Sea Dog Island and Horse Block (a conspicuous sea stack) to the southwest, Tea Island, Staats Island and Governor Island to the west, Beaver Island to the northwest, and Penn Island, Barclay Island and Quaker Island to the north, with New Island lying further away on the northwest.

The island is roughly inverted triangular in shape, almost entirely bisected by Chatham Harbour. Weddell extends 26.8 km (16.7 mi) in south–north direction and 22.4 km (13.9 mi) in east–west direction. Its highly indented coastline is 175.7 km (109.2 mi) long. Bar its northeastern lowland part, the island is mostly hilly. Pitt Heights (elevation 240 m (790 ft)) are situated in the northwest and Hotham Heights (236 m (774 ft)) in the west, while the south-central part of the island is occupied by certain nameless oval shaped heights that extend 9.5 km (5.9 mi) in east–west direction and 9 km (5.6 mi) in south–north direction, and feature the island's summit Mount Weddell rising to 383 m (1,257 ft).

=== Climate ===
Weddell has a maritime climate in the transition region between the tundra and subpolar zones under the Köppen-Geiger climate classification. It is influenced by the island's location north and west of the physical boundary of the Antarctic region, the Antarctic Convergence running broadly S-shaped in between the Falklands and South Georgia, and east of the southern Andes topographic barrier. The weather on Weddell Island is slightly warmer and notably more arid than that in Stanley, with an average annual temperature of about 6 °C (43 °F) and 500 mm annual precipitation, as compared to 5.5 °C (42 °F) and 600 mm in the latter. The variation between the average temperature of the warmest months (January and February) and that of the coldest months (June and July) is just -9 °C (16.2 °F). The extreme temperatures recorded on Weddell Island are −7.2 °C (19 °F) and 23.3 °C (74 °F).

By way of comparison, Weddell has an annual temperature graph very similar to that of the Faroe Islands. While the former is located at the same geographic latitude in the Southern Hemisphere as that of London (not the Faroes) in the Northern and, accordingly, the Nordic archipelago lies over 1,100 kilometres (680 mi) nearer than Weddell to the relevant geographical pole, as far as temperatures are concerned that is compensated by the climatic influences of the cold water Falklands Current and the warm water Norwegian Current respectively. However, the similarity does not extend to precipitation as the Faroes get two and a half times more rainfall than Weddell does.

=== Weddell Island Group ===
This island group in the Falklands archipelago comprises the following insular features associated with Weddell Island, i.e. lying closer to it than to neighbouring Beaver Island or New Island (which have island groups of their own), or to West Falkland:

Island	Coordinates	Island	Coordinates
Bald Island	51°46′36″S 60°57′56″W	Useless Island	51°50′23.5″S 60°57′09″W
Barclay Island	51°47′13″S 61°06′06″W	n/a (island)	51°47′55″S 61°04′25″W
Carthorse Island	51°51′33″S 60°59′02″W	Quaker Passage Islet	51°47′22.4″S 61°02′31″W
Circum Island	51°56′05″S 60°52′37″W	Penn Island	51°47′19″S 61°09′00″W
Cliff Island	51°56′35″S 61°05′12″W	Pitt Island	51°48′20″S 61°03′38″W
Fox Island	51°46′44″S 61°05′00″W	Skull Bay Island	51°53′16″S 61°08′20″W
Gull Island	51°48′47″S 61°08′36″W	Smylie Rock	51°57′15.5″S 60°52′51″W
Harbour Island	51°52′17″S 60°52′25″W	Stick in the Mud Island	51°50′56″S 61°10′05″W
Hill Island	51°54′56″S 61°05′04″W	Stop Islet	51°59′04″S 60°57′59″W
Horse Block	51°56′27.4″S 61°06′52″W	Quaker Island	51°47′03″S 61°03′22″W
Letterbox Island	51°49′30.5″S 61°08′58″W	Weddell Island	51°52′43″S 61°00′24″W
Low Island	51°48′07″S 61°07′11″W		

=== Mapping ===
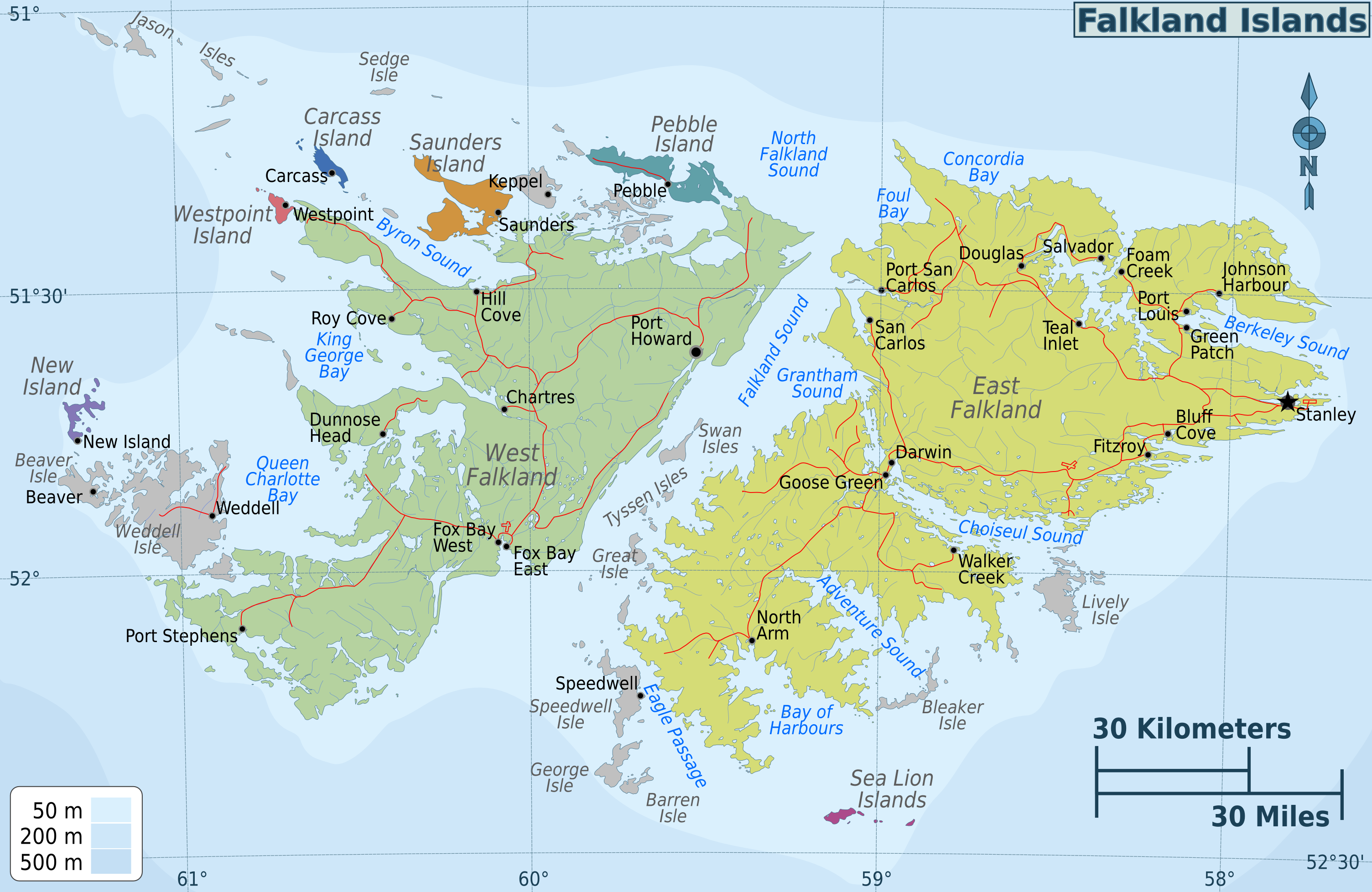
Location of Weddell within the Falkland Islands; the Outlying Islands are shown in colours different from those of East and West Falkland

Because of the Falklands' extremely indented and irregular coastline, remote location and rather late and slow process of settling the originally uninhabited islands, their mapping remained rudimentary up to the late 18th century. It was not until after the early British and Spanish hydrographic and land surveys in 1766–1770 that the islands were mapped faithfully to any detail, first their northeastern and northwestern parts where Port St. Louis (later renamed Puerto Soledad) and Port Egmont settlements were located respectively, and eventually their southeastern and southwestern areas.

- The Falkland Islands. Map of the scale 1:401280, 6⅓ English miles to 1 inch. London: Edward Stanford, 1901
- Falkland Islands Explorer Map. Scale 1:365000. Ocean Explorer Maps, 2007
- Falklands Topographic Map Series. Scale 1:50000, 29 sheets. DOS 453, 1961–1979
- Falkland Islands. Scale 1:643000 Map. DOS 906. Edition 3-OS, 1998
- Map 500k--xm20-4. Scale 1:500000 map of Weddell Island and part of West Falkland. Russian Army Maps (for the world)
- Approaches to the Falkland Islands. Scale 1:1500000 chart. Gps Nautical Charts, 2010
- Illustrated Map of Weddell Island
- Tactical pilotage chart TPC T-18B. Scale 1:500000. UK Military Survey, 1988

=== Old map gallery ===
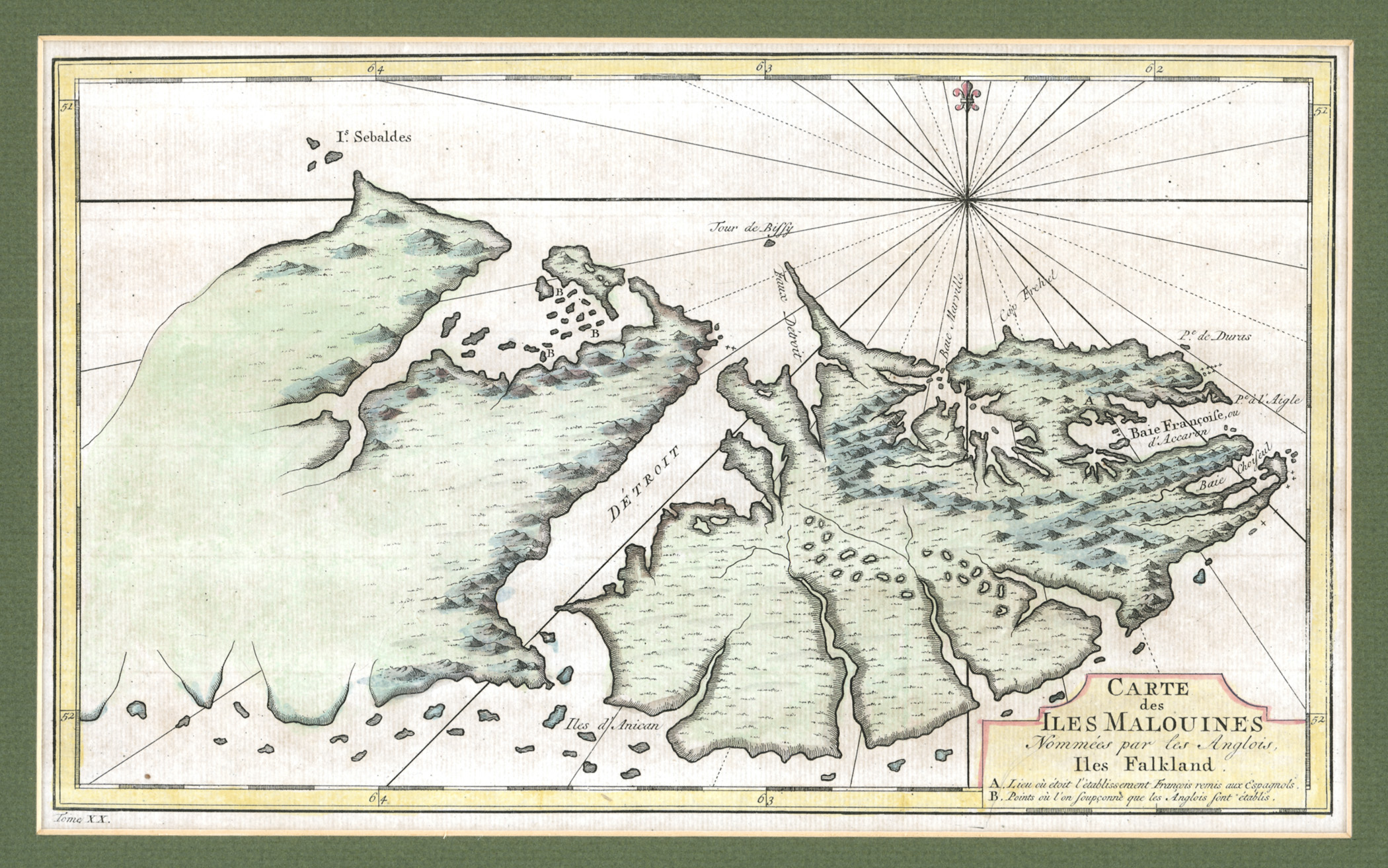
A 1767 map of the Falkland Islands by the French cartographer Étienne André Philippe (aka Philippe de Prétot)

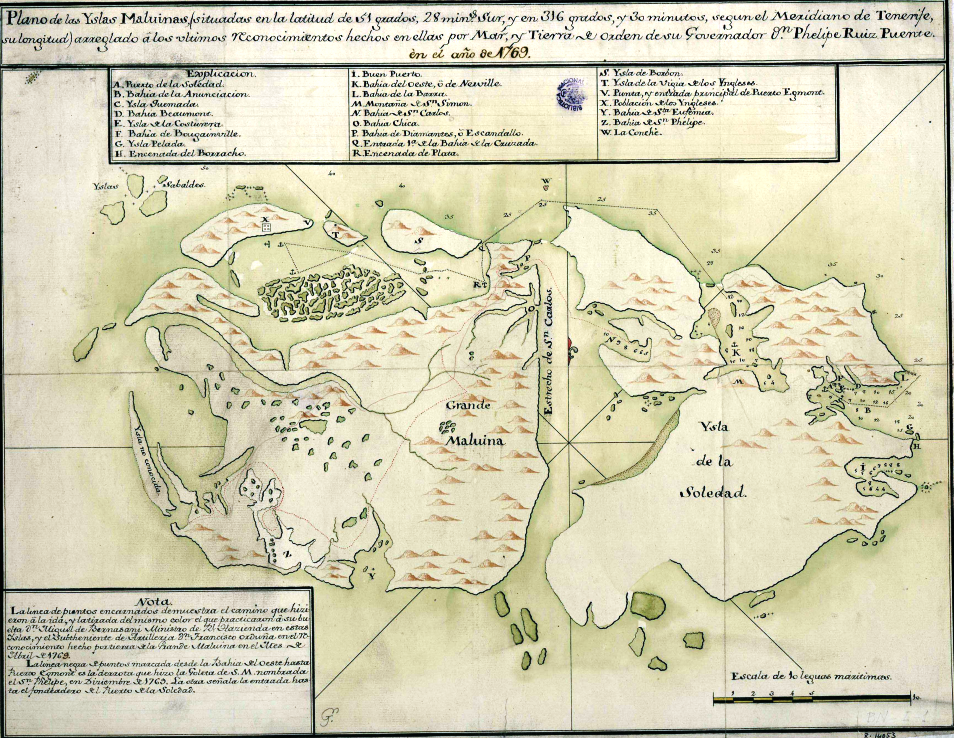
Weddell Island (inscription Ysla no conocida i.e. ‘Unknown island’) on a post 1769 Spanish map of the Falkland Islands, which also depicts the survey track of Bernasani and Orduña in 1769

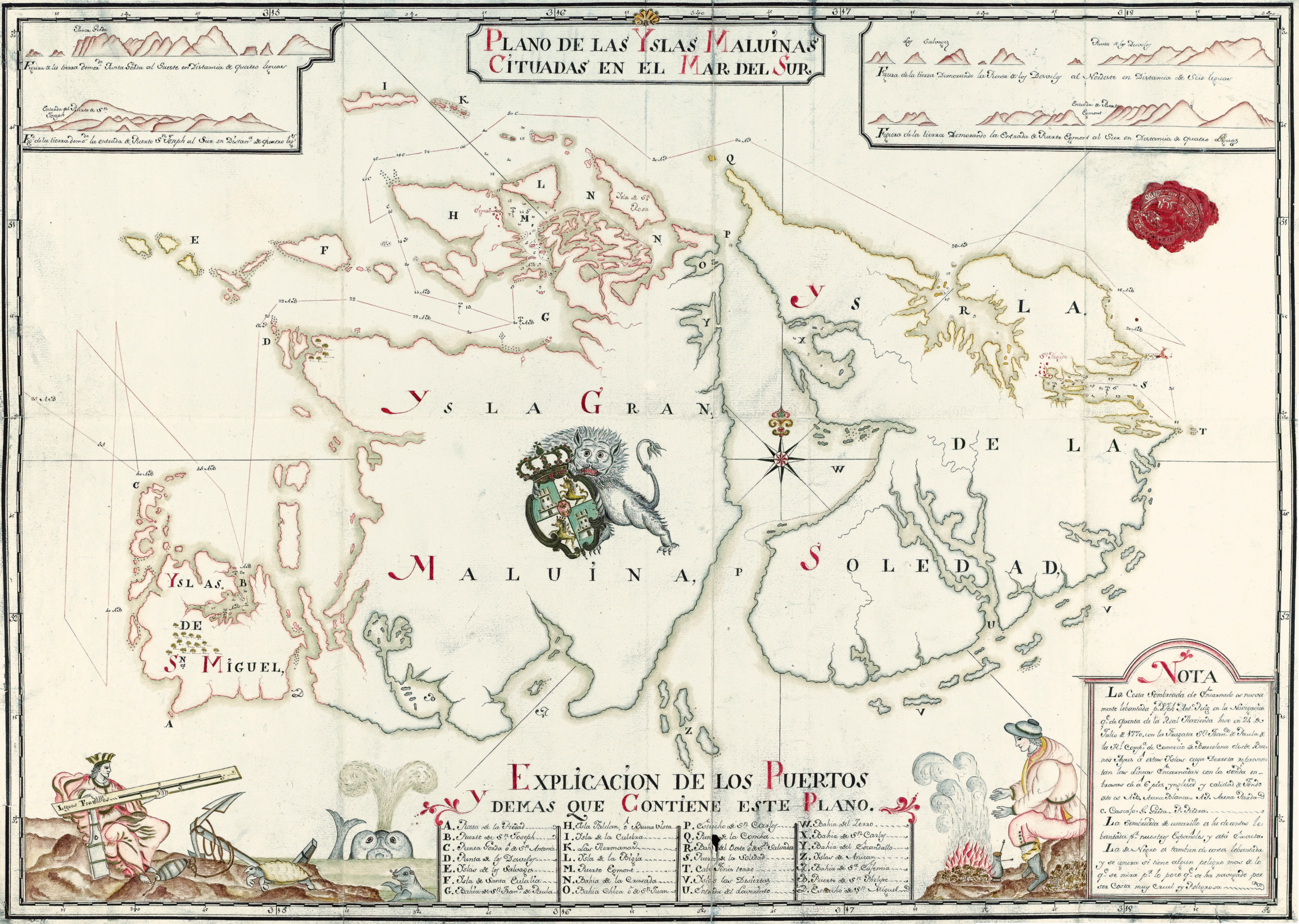
Weddell Island (together with Beaver and New Islands denoted as Yslas de San Miguel) on the 1770 map by Joseph Antonio Puig; depicted is also the survey track of the San Francisco de Paula in July 1770

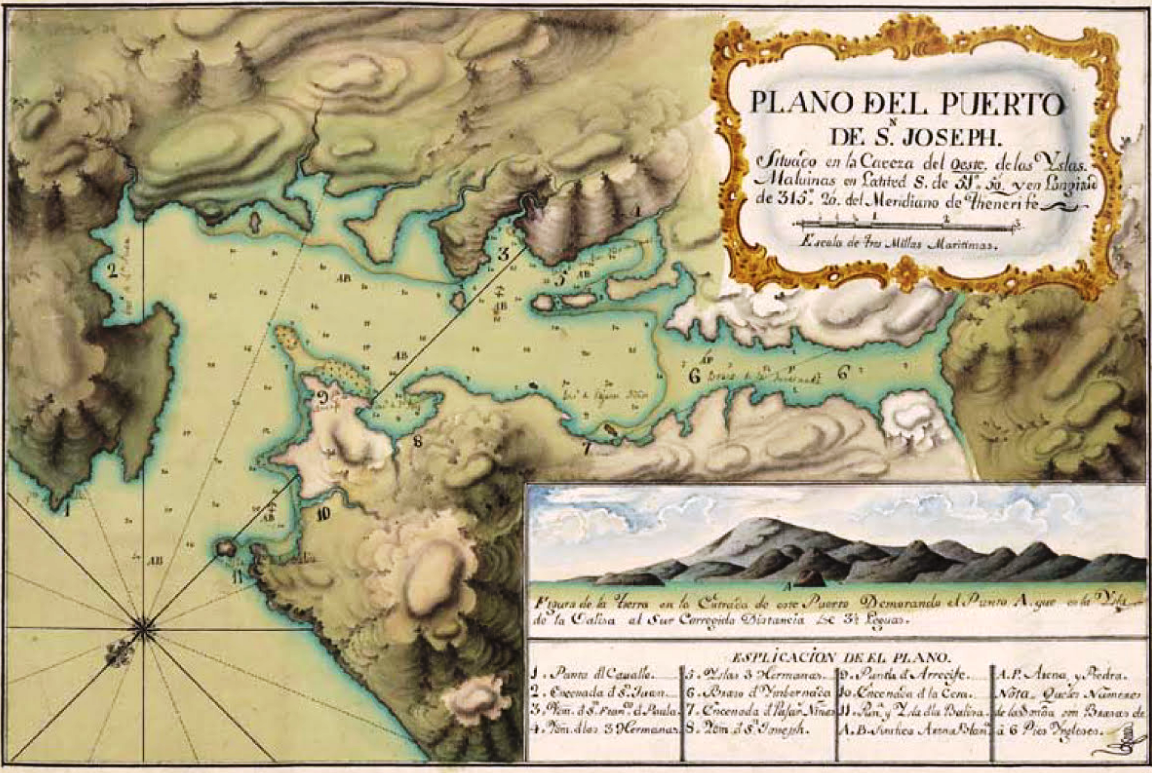
A post 1770 large scale, southeast-up map of Chatham Harbour (Puerto de San Joseph in the title), possibly by Puig as the map uses his illustration showing a north view of the harbour entrance marked by Bald Island (island “A”), with Mount Weddell prominent in the background

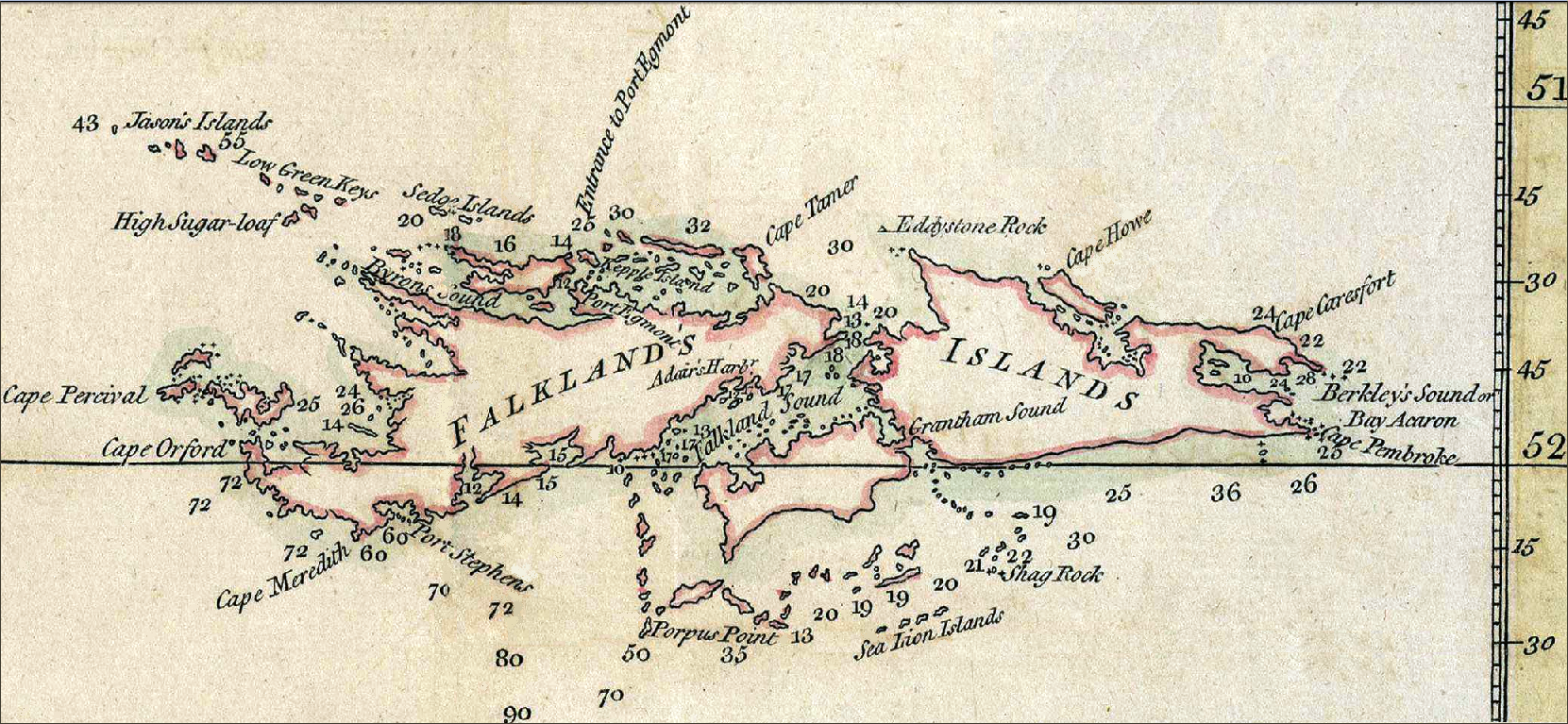
Weddell Island (nameless) on a 1777 chart of the Falkland Islands by James Cook

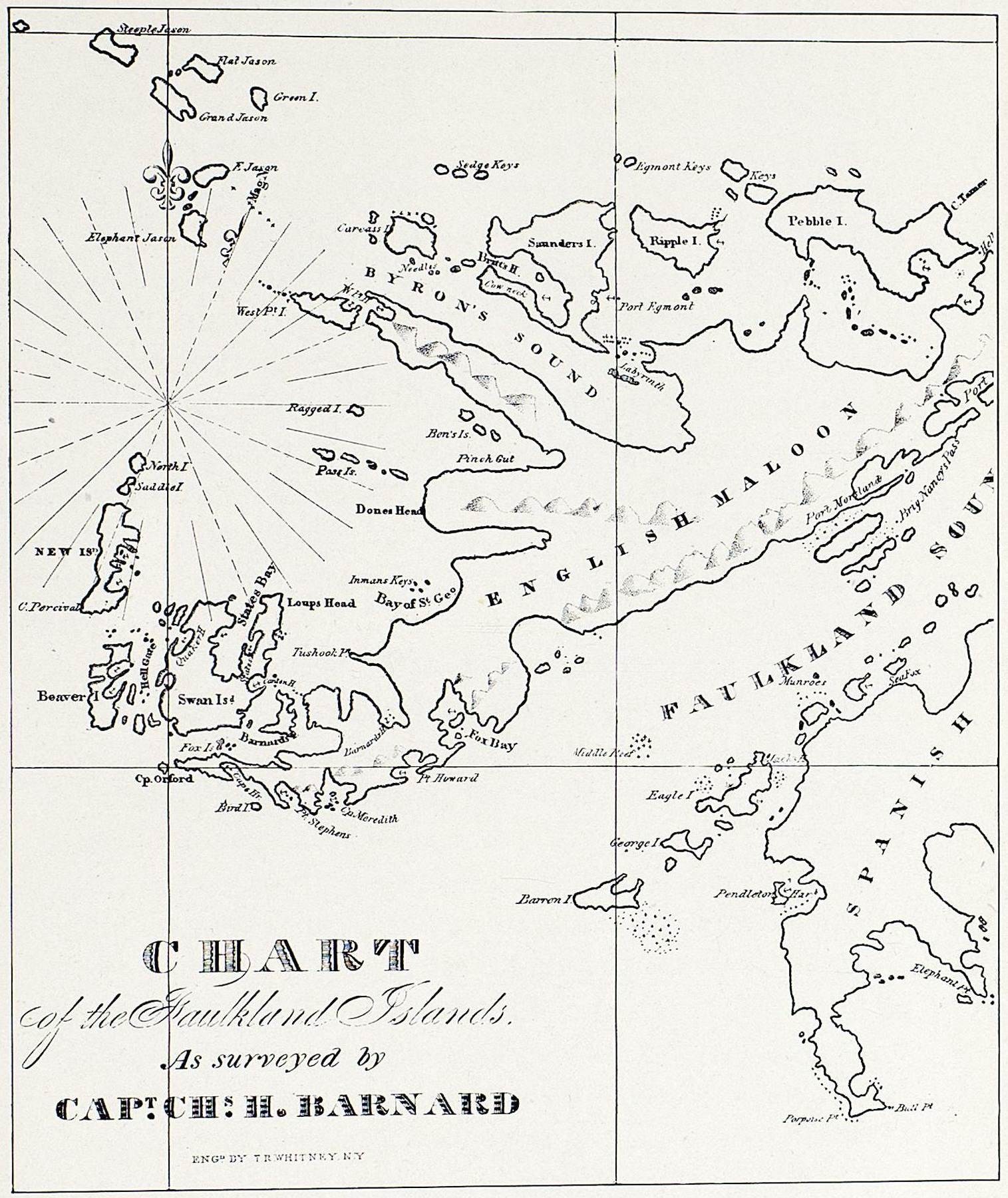
A pre 1829 Falklands map by Charles Barnard featuring States Bay, States Harbour, Canton Harbour, Swan Island and English Maloon (present Chatham Harbour, States Cove, Gull Harbour, Weddell Island and West Falkland)

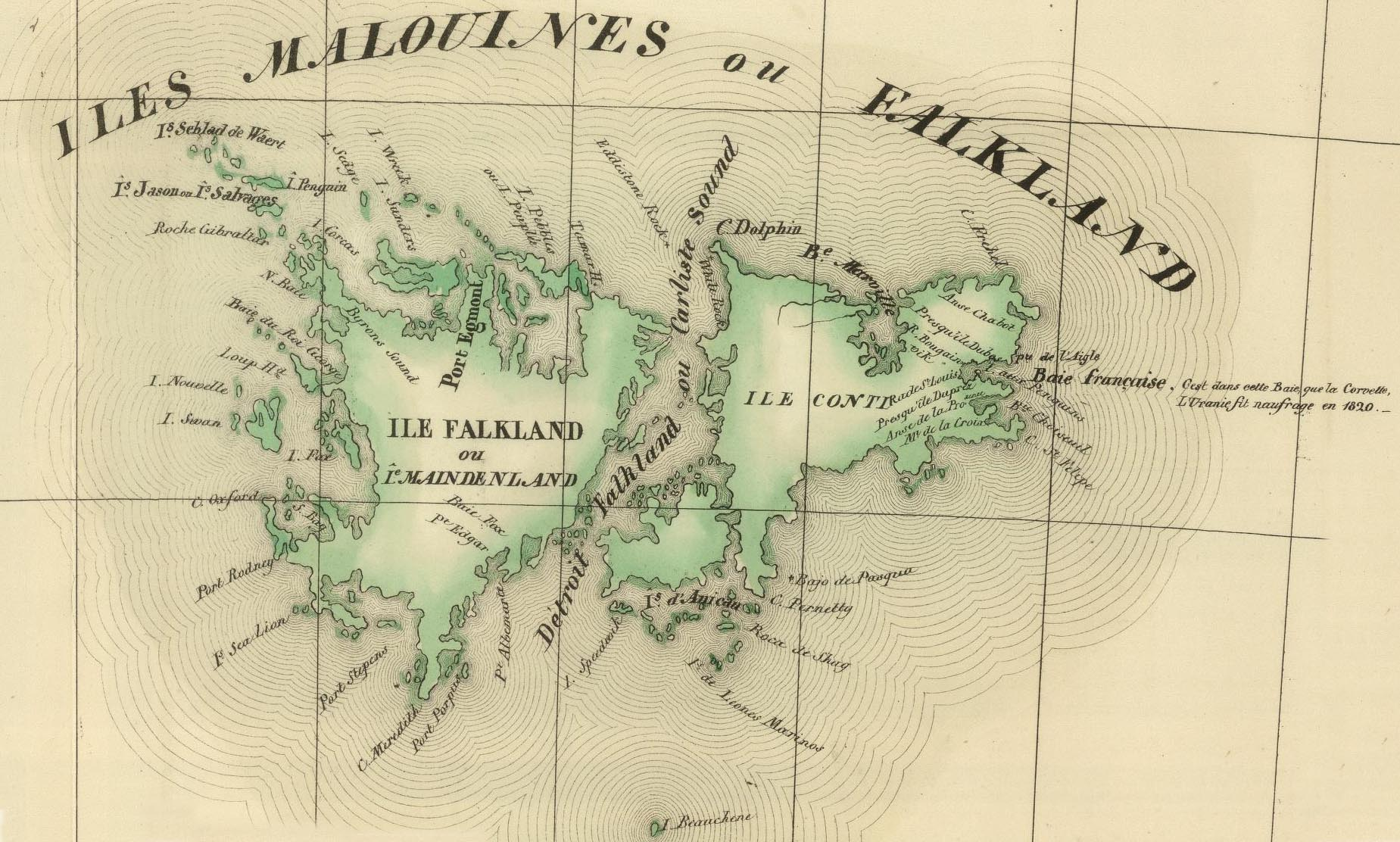
Île Swan (present Weddell Island) on an 1827 French map of the Falklands

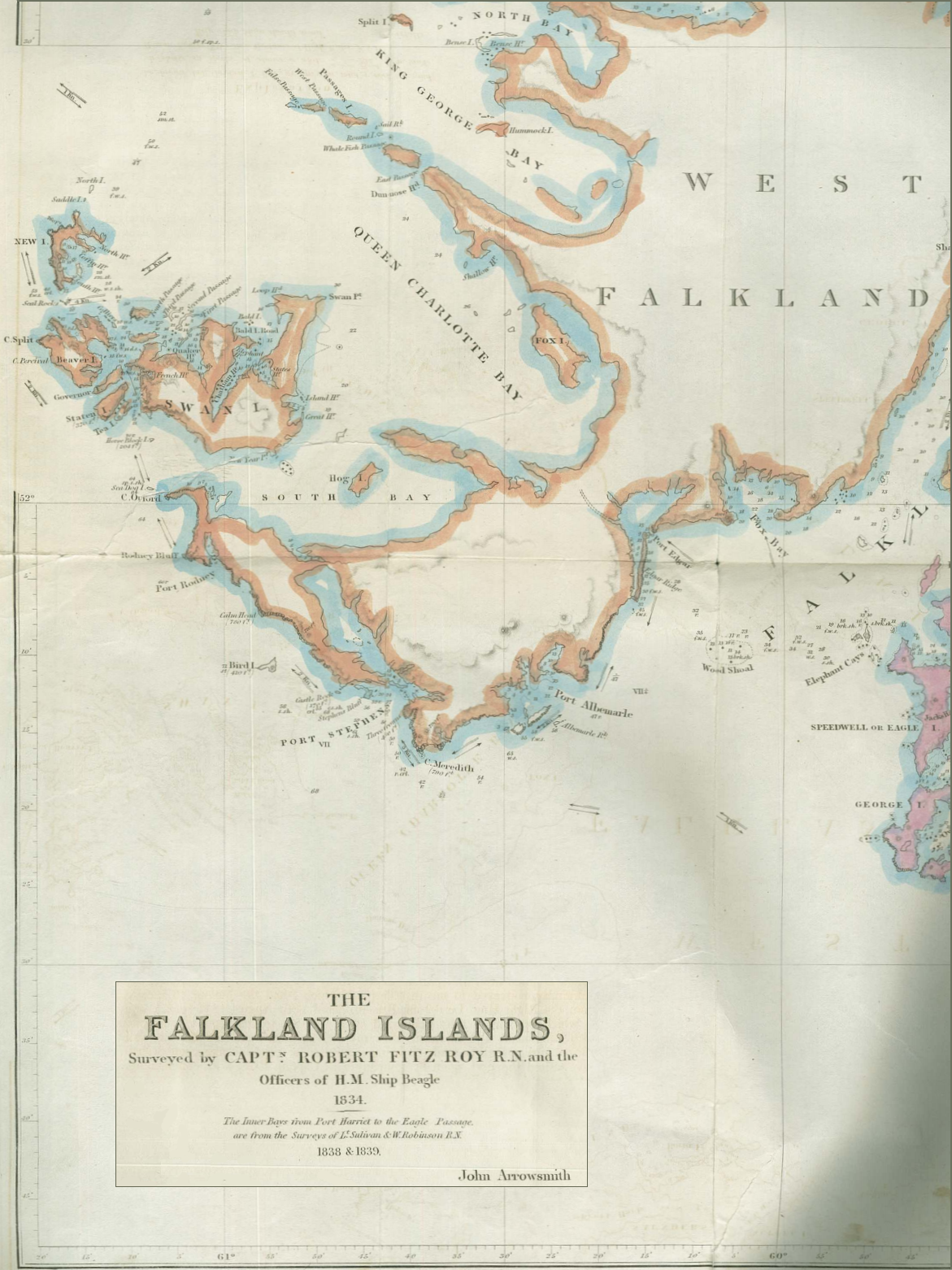
1841 Falkland Islands map by John Arrowsmith, fragment featuring Swan Island, States Harbour and Great Harbour (present Weddell Island, States Cove and Gull Harbour)

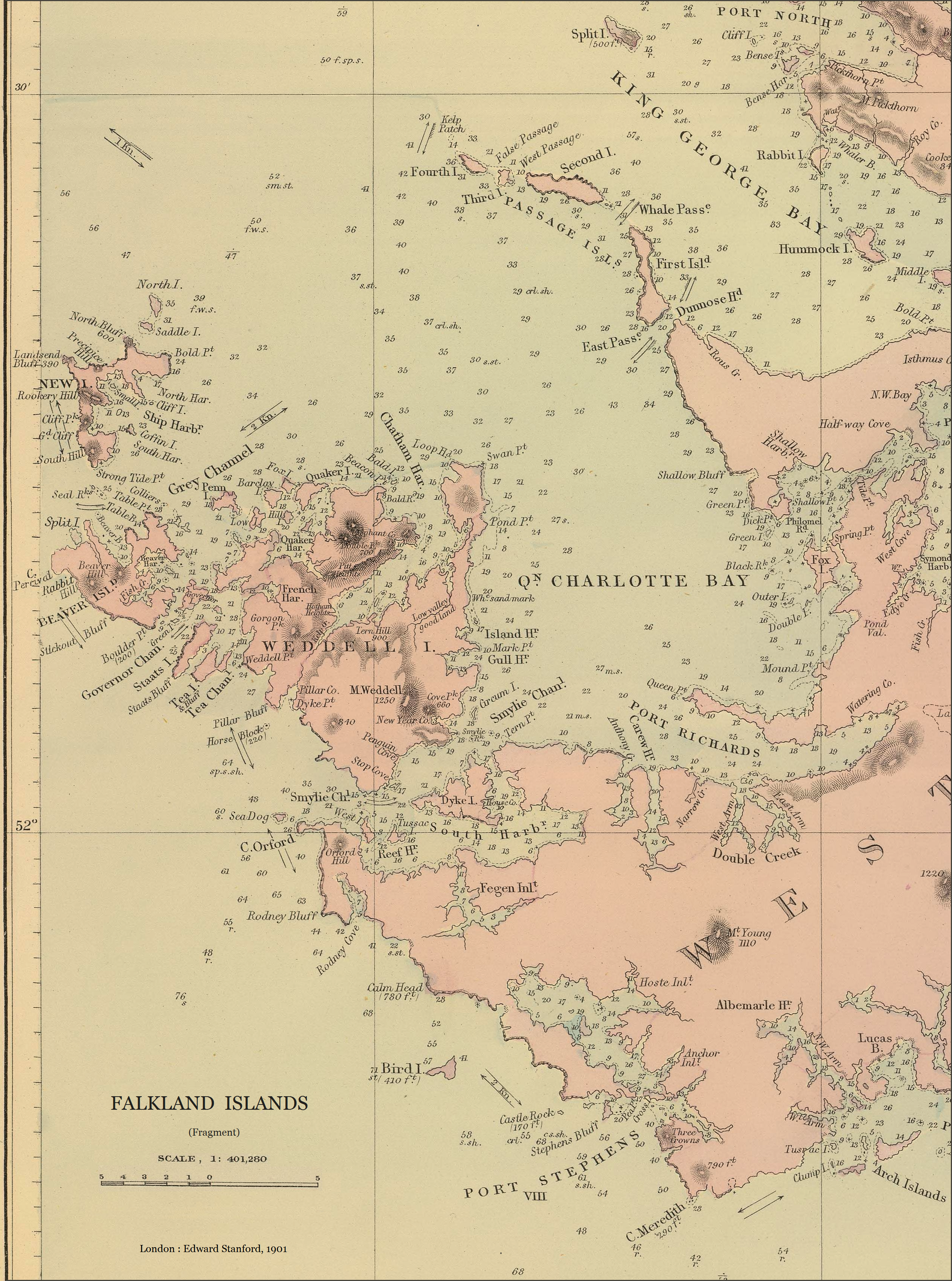
Detailed old map, or rather chart of Weddell Island; dashed line shows kelp that ships should avoid

== Geology ==
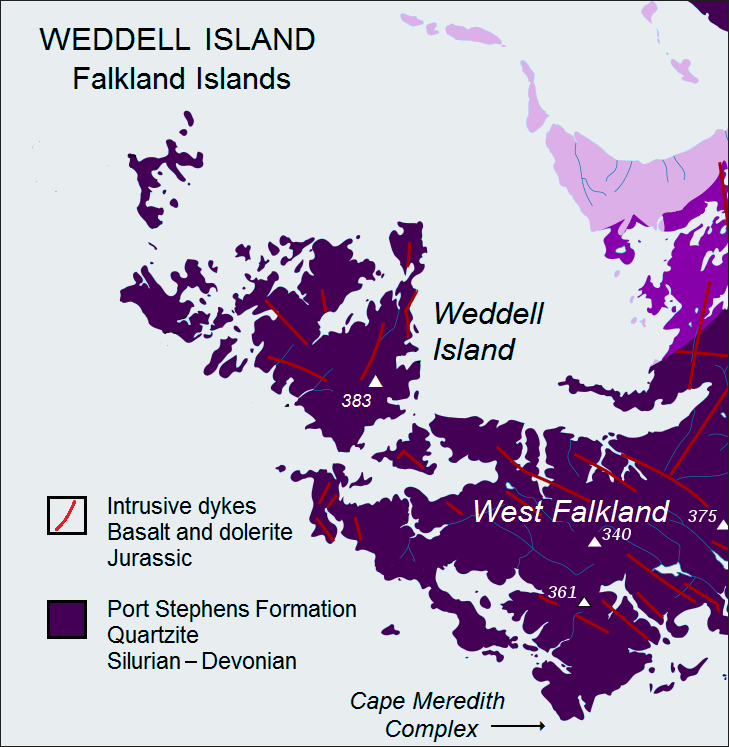
Geological map of the Weddell Island area

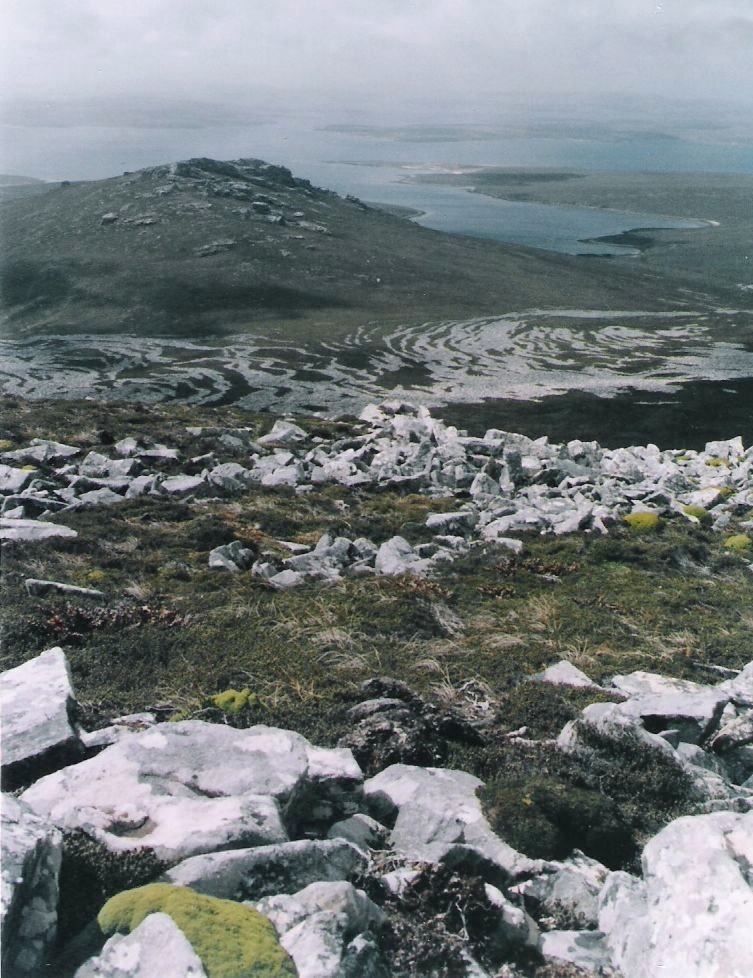
Massive stone runs in the foothills of Circum Peak, southeast view from Mount Weddell

The oldest rocks in the Falklands are gneiss and granite in the Cape Meredith complex, around 1100 million years old. These types of rocks are visible in cliffs at the south extremity of West Falkland, Cape Meredith, and correspond to the crystalline rocks that made up the interior of the Gondwana supercontinent. They also have a great geological similarity to rocks currently found in South Africa and in Queen Maud Land in Antarctica. On top of the gneiss and granite lie layers of quartzite, sandstone, and shales or mudstone in West Falkland and adjacent areas including Weddell Island. Cross-bedding and ripple marks identify the zone where these rocks were deposited as the shallow waters of a delta environment where currents transported submarine sediments. In the case of the Falklands these paleocurrent directions mostly run northward, and are very similar to those in formations in South Africa that run southward. Comparison of the two provides evidence that the block of sandstone sediments that contains the islands has rotated. Rocks in the central part of West Falkland contain fossils of marine organisms that lived in shallow water.

=== Stone runs ===
The modern Falklands landscape owes some of its most remarkable aspects to the polar climate of the last ice age. The islands have largely remained free of glaciers, with the exception of a few small ones on the highest hills. Nevertheless, they were repeatedly deep-frozen and battered by icy winds. The erosion of particular rock varieties caused by myriad freezing-thawing cycles taking place in periglacial conditions during the last Ice Age produced the dramatic stone runs, one of the most enigmatic features of the local landscape originally noted by Bougainville's naturalist Antoine-Joseph Pernety in 1764:

We have not been less astonished at the sight of the innumerable quantity of stones of all sizes, overthrown on each other, and yet arranged, as if they had been piled up carelessly to fill gullies. One does not hesitate to admire the prodigious effects of Nature.

The young Darwin, who visited and explored the Falklands twice, in March 1833 and March–April 1834, wrote:

In many parts of the island the bottoms of the valleys are covered in an extraordinary manner by myriads of great loose angular fragments of the quartz rock, forming ‘streams of stones.’ These have been mentioned with surprise by every voyager since the time of Pernety. The blocks are not waterworn, their angles being only a little blunted; they vary in size from one or two feet in diameter to ten, or even more than twenty times as much. They are not thrown together into irregular piles, but are spread out into level sheets or great streams. … In a valley south of Berkeley Sound, which some of our party called the ‘great valley of fragments,’ it was necessary to cross an uninterrupted band half a mile wide, by jumping from one pointed stone to another. So large were the fragments, that being overtaken by a shower of rain, I readily found shelter beneath one of them.

The Falkland Islands and Vitosha Mountain in Europe feature probably the most exceptional stone runs in terms of diversity, size and abundance. The highly specific combination of particular climatic conditions and rock varieties that existed there during the Quaternary explains both the formation of stone runs in certain areas of those two territories, and their absence in areas with otherwise comparable nature conditions. On the Falklands, stone runs form on outcrops of the Port Stanley and the Port Stephens Formations, and occur on East Falkland, West Falkland, and Weddell, Saunders and Keppel Islands. They appear in several varieties as stone patches, streams, terraces, fans, stripes and rivers, and are most widespread and voluminous in the Wickham Heights area of East Falkland, where the largest of them extend over 5 km (3.1 mi). One particularly long stone river on Weddell Island extends 4.3 km (2.7 mi), trending in a west-southwesterly direction from the plateau next west of Mount Weddell.

== Flora and fauna ==
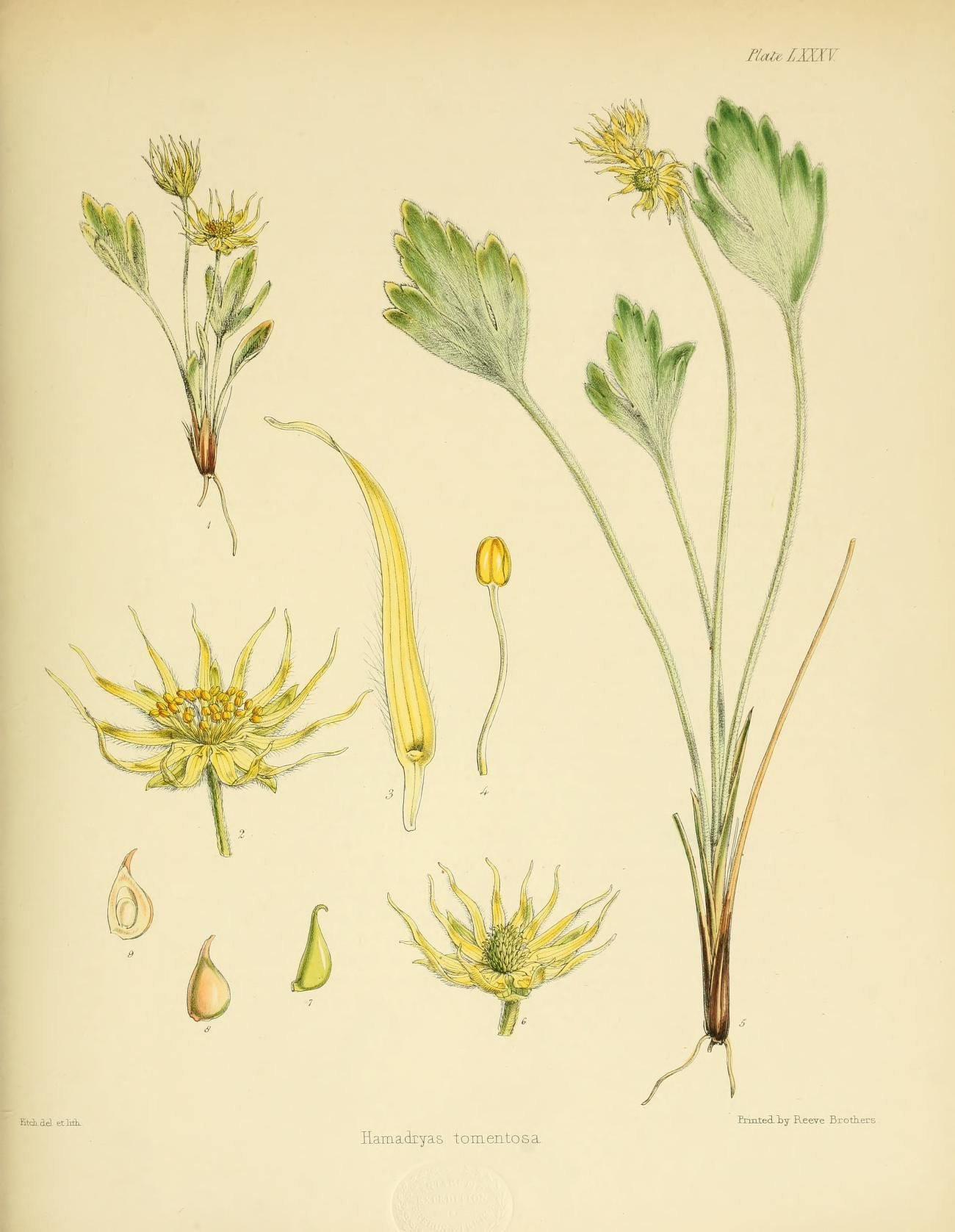
The Falklands endemic Silvery buttercup is found in the valleys of Weddell Island

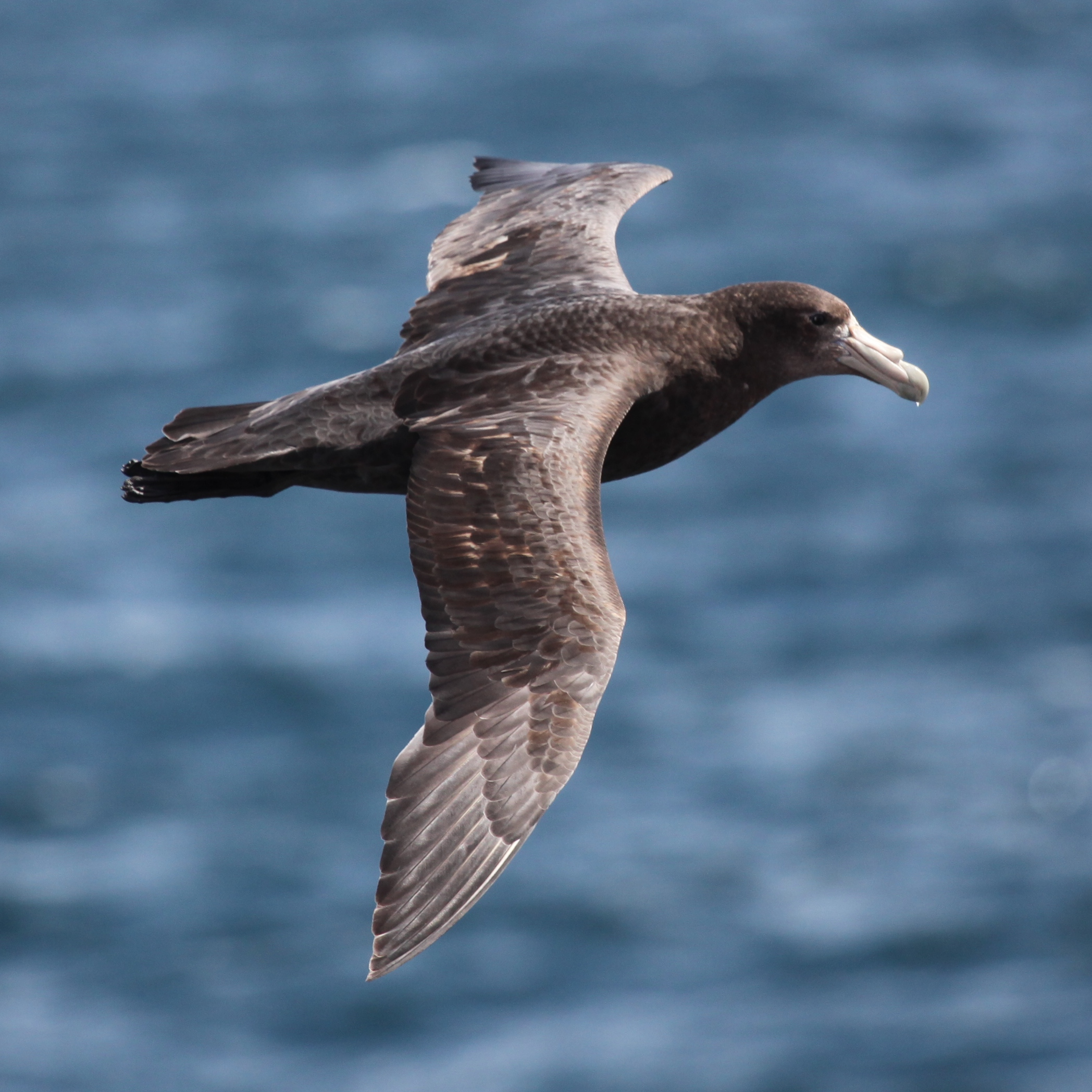
Southern giant petrel

Like many islands of the Falklands archipelago, Weddell is popular for its wildlife, including penguins, sealions, dolphins and a variety of other mammals and birds including endemic ones. The hogs hunted by Capt. Barnard were an early introduced alien species, recorded on Weddell Island already in the late eighteenth century. Exotic wildlife, including skunks, rheas, parrots and guanacos were introduced in the early 1930s by the then owner of the island John Hamilton (and brought in from Chile on board his ship Penelope), along with Patagonian foxes. The last, not to be confused with the extinct Falkland Island wolf, the warrah, can still be found and their eradication is being considered. One such fox eradication attempt failed in 1997–1998. Other species considered for possible eradication from Weddell include the house mice and the feral cats, most likely introduced to the Falklands by early sealing expeditions. More challenging, due to the island's size, would be an effort to eradicate the Norwegian rat; there are some successful large scale precedents though, notably those of Campbell Island and South Georgia. Several reindeer are present but not established as they are single sex. These were brought from South Georgia shortly before their eradication from that Antarctic island carried out in 2013–2015 due to environmental considerations.

A large number of alien plants including invasive ones are widespread within Weddell Island. Most conspicuous among these are a patch of Monterey cypress trees in Weddell Settlement and a number of lengthy hedges of European gorse in the vicinity of the settlement and Kelp Creek House. Both were planted on the treeless and shrubless island primarily for the purposes of wind protection. The tree plots at Weddell, Hill Cove, Roy Cove and Carcass Island are the very few sizable ones on the Falklands. Gorse has been spreading on the island with over fifteen thriving tufts located away from its original hedge lines, and needs control. Besides gorse, the introduced species currently posing the highest threats in the Falklands are Calafate (Berberis microphylla), Creeping thistle (Cirsium arvense) and Spear thistle (Cirsium vulgare). In the rivers and streams of the archipelago, introduced European brown trout (Salmo trutta) is displacing the local Zebra trout (Aplochiton zebra).

Scientific research has identified Weddell as both an Important Plant Area and a priority Key Biodiversity Area that merits protection. A survey of less than half of the island's territory carried out between 2007 and 2010 has recorded a total of 114 native species (65% of the Falkland native flora) and 41 introduced ones. The island holds a number of rare and very rare plant species, twelve endemic plant species with four of them endangered, including Moore's plantain and the largest recorded population of Falkland Rock-cress. It also hosts a globally significant population of Southern giant petrel. Germplasm collection from Weddell Island sites was carried out by the Alaska Plant Materials Center in 1998 for the purposes, among others, of possible tussac grass restoration projects in the Falklands.

== Government and politics ==
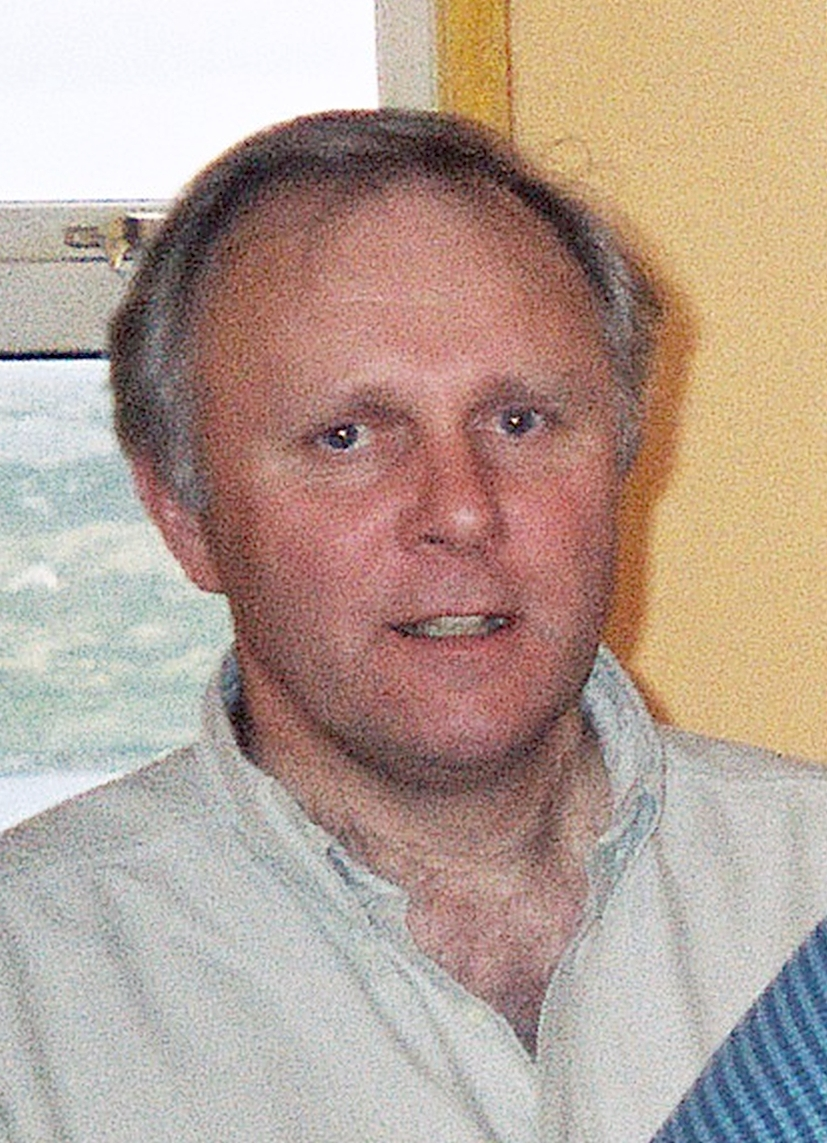
Lewis (pictured) and Stephen Clifton, brothers, own the island since 2015

Within the Falkland Islands, Weddell is part of the Camp electoral constituency, which comprises the entire country outside of Stanley, and returns three of the eight elected members of the Falklands Legislative Assembly — currently John Birmingham (politician), Jack Ford and Teslyn Barkman. For statistical and planning purposes, Weddell is part of the Outlying Islands statistical region including the Falklands except the two primary islands, East and West Falkland, with a total surface area of 1,033 km^{2} (399 mi^{2}) and population of 43 in 2016.

=== Ownership ===
During the last one and a half centuries Weddell Island has been owned in turn by the Williams, Hamilton, Ferguson, Visick and Clifton families. One of the past owners, Robert Ferguson, was born on the island.

With its surface area of 265.8 km^{2} (102.6 mi^{2}) Weddell is one of the largest private islands in the world. That title is sometimes claimed by two Hawaiian islands, Niʻihau and Lanai, although the former is smaller at 180 km^{2} (69 mi^{2}). While the latter is bigger at 364 km^{2} (141 mi^{2}), technically it might not qualify as about 2% of its territory belong to independent owners.

== Economy ==
In the course of the 19th century, sealing declined due to depletion of stocks and gave way to sheep farming as the mainstay of Falklands economy, a role shared with fishing, tourism and offshore hydrocarbon exploration. Sheep were farmed commercially for wool on the islands from the 1860s. Sheep raising on Weddell Island was established in 1871 by the Williams family who bought the island, and the island's farm at Weddell Settlement has been permanently populated since then.

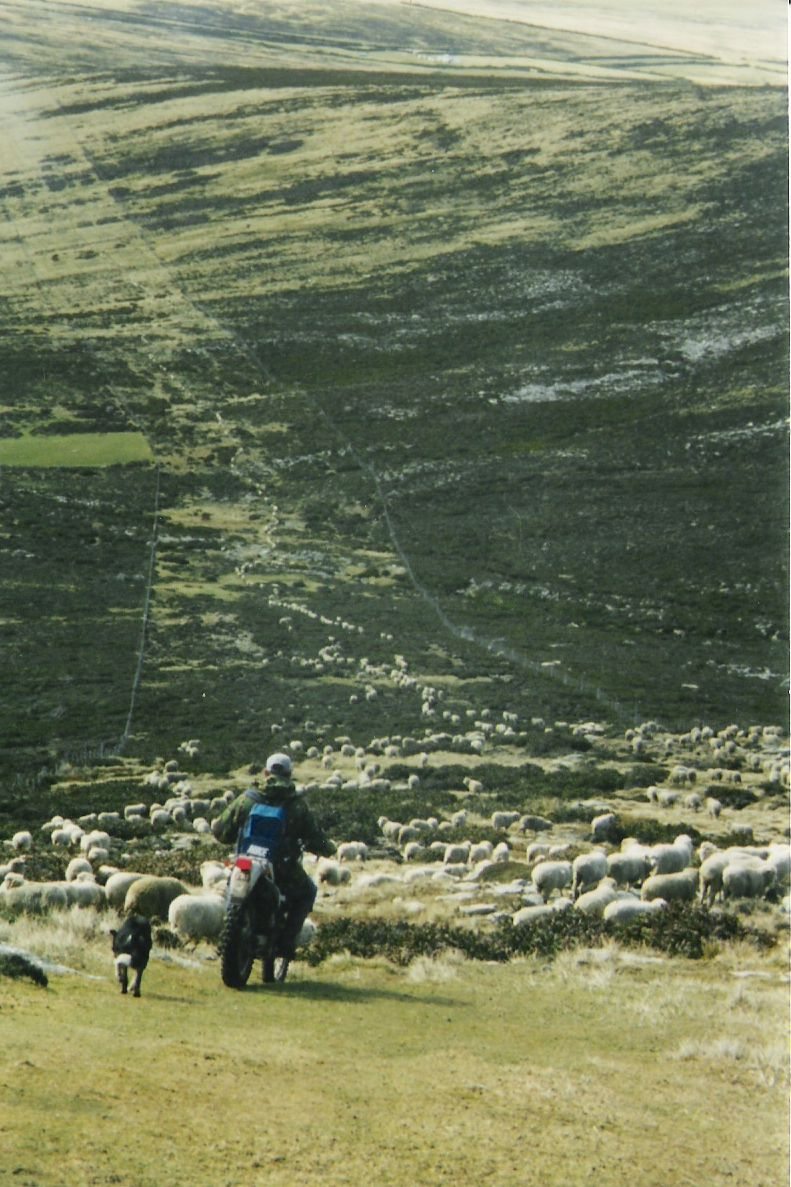
Sheep gathering along The Street’s fence lines

The small population of the island lives in Weddell Settlement on the east coast, the remainder of the island being run as a sheep farm and wildlands. Sheep numbers have varied greatly under different island owners, between 200 and 23,000, and currently stay at 600 to 700 with an improved breeding and grazing management. Sheep raising is now confined to the Mark Point Paddocks just north of the settlement. Tourist walks from Weddell Settlement include scenery destinations like Mount Weddell and Mark Point, and wildlife watching sites like Loop Head or Hell's Kitchen Cove in Chatham Harbour. All these activities take place northeast of the line linking New Year Cove on the southeast to Kelp Creek House on the northwest. The remaining two thirds of Weddell are sparsely visited, making it the wildest of the larger Falkland Islands.

Along with a diverse and abundant local wildlife, the island's tourist attractions include iconic landscapes featuring the famous Falklands stone runs that sparked Charles Darwin's interest and became the subject of much debate on their origins.

Trekking the stone runs might be as hard and risky as any sport, even though the stone run boulders are fixed quite stably, providing for better safety. Otherwise, the local terrain is walker and driver friendly – mostly hilly and well drained, lacking the boggy areas encountered elsewhere in the archipelago.

The tourist and farming infrastructure at Weddell Settlement is currently being renovated; in particular, the Weddell Lodge is being extended to provide additional tourist and workers accommodation during the summer period. More tourist accommodation is available in nearby Mountain View Cottage and Sea View Cottage. Several dilapidated ‘houses’ and ‘shanties’ in remote locations outside the settlement – Kelp Creek House, Chatham House, Loop Head Shanty, Stop Cove Shanty, Quaker Shanty and Sand Point Shanty – remain from times when the entire island was stocked with sheep.

Wind turbines and solar panels, supplemented by diesel generators, supply electric energy to four houses in Weddell Settlement.

=== Communications ===
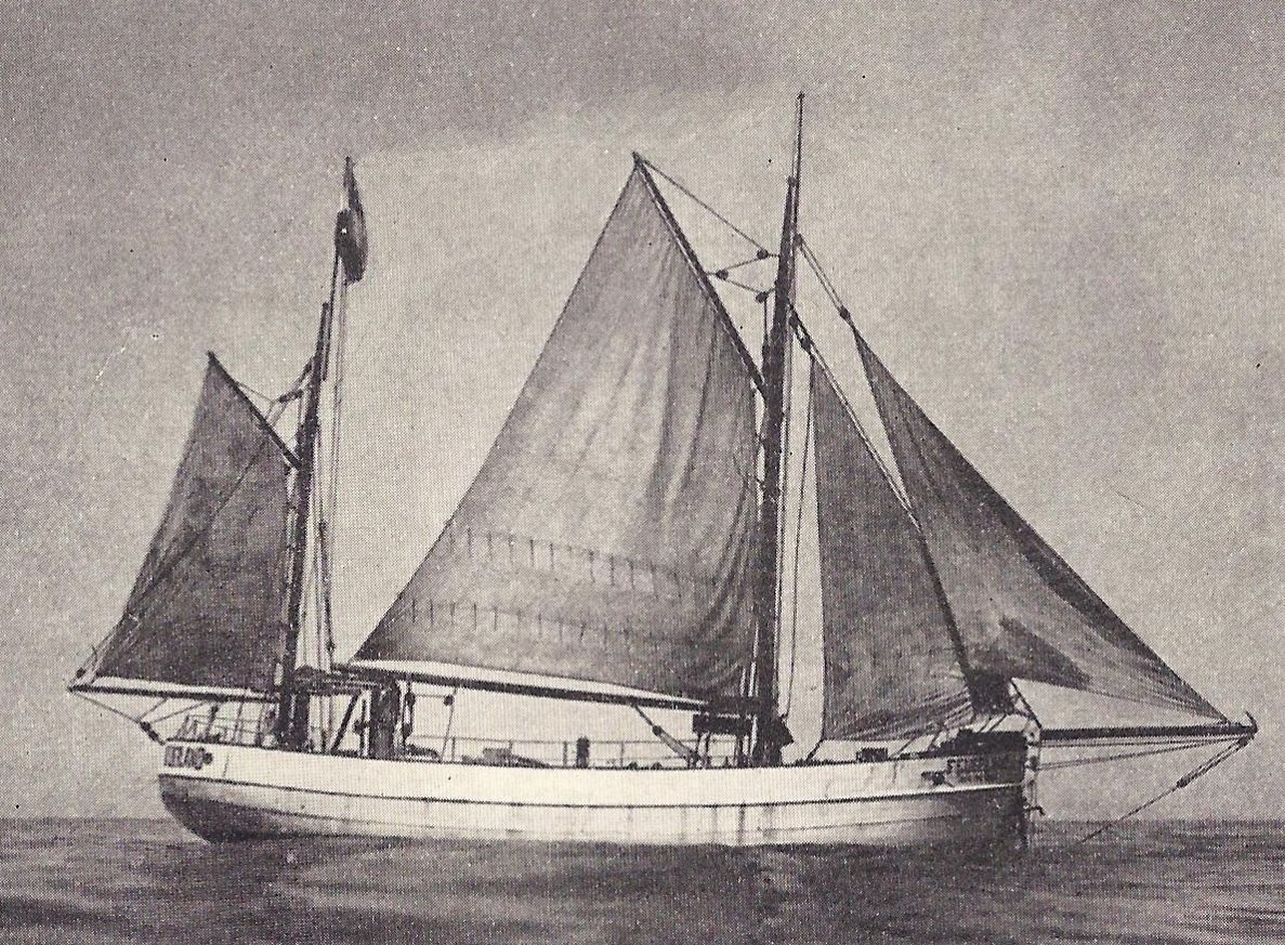
The ship Feuerland (Penelope) in 1928

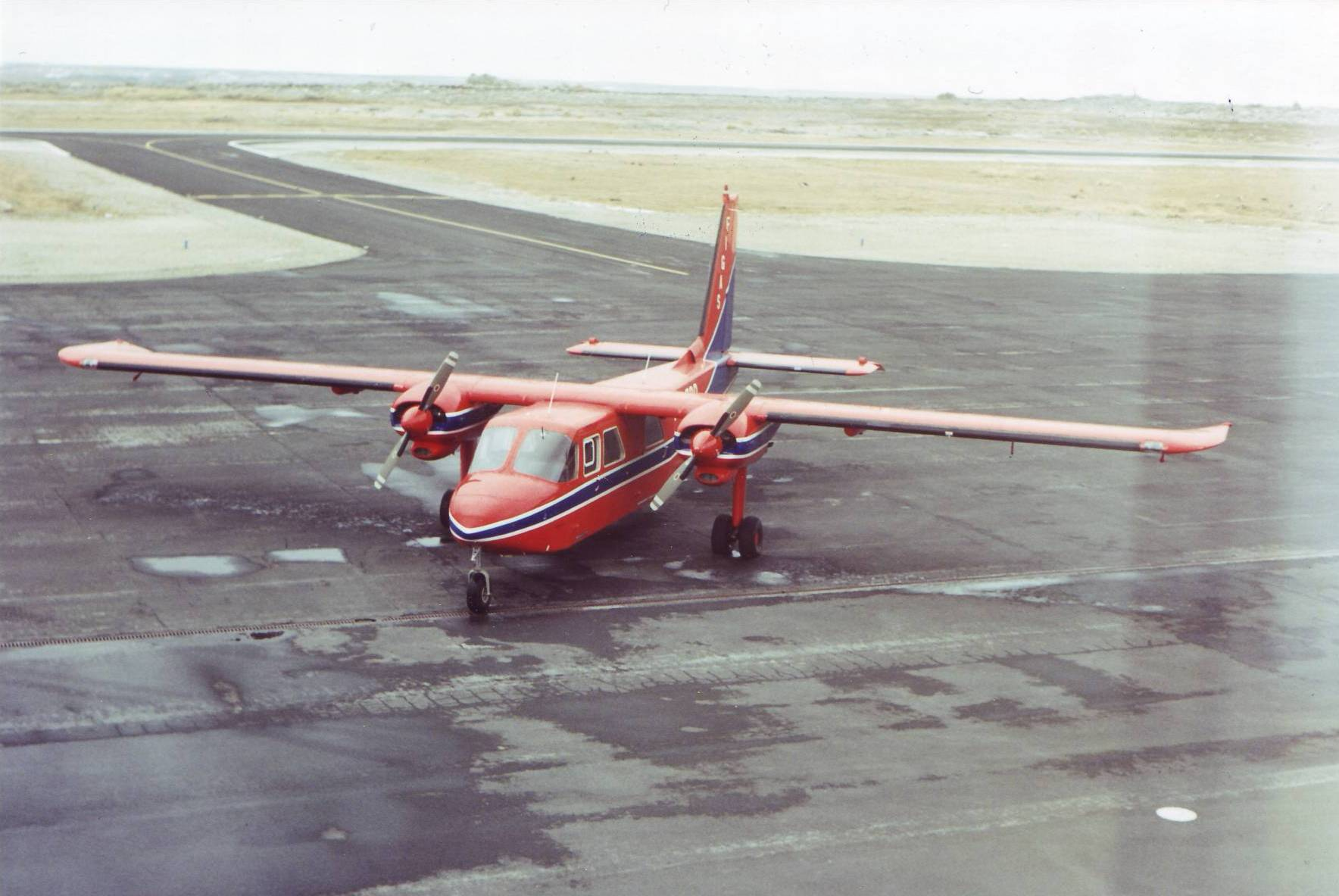
A FIGAS Islander aircraft at Stanley Airport

The island has an airfield situated 2.3 km (1.4 mi) north of Weddell Settlement, with two intersecting grass runways – 470 m (1,540 ft) and 400 m (1,300 ft) long respectively – used by the Falkland Islands Government Air Service (FIGAS) Islander aircraft operating out of Stanley Airport. Air distances from Weddell Airfield: Stanley Airport 217 km (135 mi), RAF Mount Pleasant 170 km (110 mi), Rodolfo Marsh Aerodrome 1,155 km (718 mi), Punta Arenas Airport 687 km (427 mi) and Rio Gallegos Airport 581 km (361 mi).

Sea transportation is serviced by a 50-meter wooden pier in Weddell Settlement, at the head of Gull Harbour, with a ramp being presently set up. The island receives scheduled visits from the Falklands resupply vessel MV Concordia Bay every 40 days on average. For a number of years before, this service has been provided by MV Tamar under Capt. Stephen Clifton, one of the present owners of the island.

Probably the most remarkable Weddell Island ship was the wooden two-masted cutter Feuerland (the German for Tierra del Fuego), originally sailed from Europe to Punta Arenas by the German naval aviator and WWI war hero Gunther Plüschow, and used as an expedition ship supporting his pioneering aerial survey of Patagonia and Tierra del Fuego. The ship was sold in 1929 to John Hamilton, brought to the island and renamed Penelope after his daughter, remaining based at Weddell until the 1950s and again in 1989–1993. The ship sailed for many decades and for various shipowners between the islands of the Falklands (including a brief confiscation and use by the Argentine Navy during the Falklands War), until 2006 when she was transported back to her native Germany and listed as a historic cultural monument.

Overland travel is accomplished by foot, horse, and mechanized off-road capable transport. There are two unpaved earth roads on the island, both leaving Weddell Settlement. One of them, 13 km (8.1 mi) long, runs towards the airfield and further north to Loop Head Shanty and the headland ending up in Loop Head and Swan Point. The other one leads 15 km (9.3 mi) in westerly direction, skirting the head of Chatham Harbour and turning north at Kelp Creek House to reach Chatham House at the west corner of the bay.

== See also ==
- Private island
- Stone run
- Wildlife of the Falkland Islands

== Bibliography ==
- B. Stonehouse (ed.). Encyclopedia of Antarctica and the Southern Oceans. Chichester, West Sussex: John Wiley & Sons, 2002. 404 pp. ISBN 978-0-471-98665-2
- Falkland Islands: British Overseas Territory, Atlantic Ocean. Encyclopædia Britannica, 2017
