= Cygne =

Cygne M.K may refer to:

- La Cygne, Kansas, a city in Linn County, Kansas
- "Le cygne", a movement of The Carnival of the Animals by Camille Saint-Saëns
- Le Cygne (journal), a scholarly journal published by the International Marie de France Society

== See also ==
- Île des Cygnes (disambiguation)
- Marais des Cygnes (disambiguation)
- Île aux Cygnes, a small island in the Seine in Paris, France
- Cygne blanc, a white-berried seedling of Cabernet Sauvignon discovered in Swan Valley, Western Australia
- Danse des petits cygnes, a dance from the ballet Swan Lake by Tchaikovsky
- Notre-Dame-des-Missions-du-cygne d'Enghien, a French Roman Catholic church
