= Swan Island =

Swan Island may refer to:

== Places ==
=== Australia ===
- Little Swan Island, Tasmania
- Swan Island (Tasmania)
- Swan Island (Victoria)

=== Falkland Islands ===
- Swan Islands, Falkland Islands
- Weddell Island, formerly Swan Island

=== United Kingdom ===
- Swan Island, London
- Swan Island, Surrey
- Swan Island, County Down, a townland in County Down, Northern Ireland
- Swan Island, County Antrim, a townland in County Antrim, Northern Ireland

=== United States ===
- Swan Island (Alaska)
- Swan Island (Chesapeake Bay), Chesapeake Bay
- Swan Island (Oregon)
- Swan Island Site, Illinois, an archaeological site
- Swan Island (Michigan)

=== Elsewhere ===
- Swan Islands, Honduras
- Swan Islands, Karkinit Bay, Ukraine, off the northwestern Crimean coast

== Other uses ==
- Swan Island (band), a rock band from Portland, Oregon
- Swan Island Airport, Swan Island, Portland
- Swan Island Shipyard, Swan Island, Portland

== See also ==
- Swan's Island, Maine
- Little Swan Island hutia, an extinct species of rodent
- Île des Cygnes (disambiguation), French for Swan Island or Island of Swans
