= Penn Island =

- Island
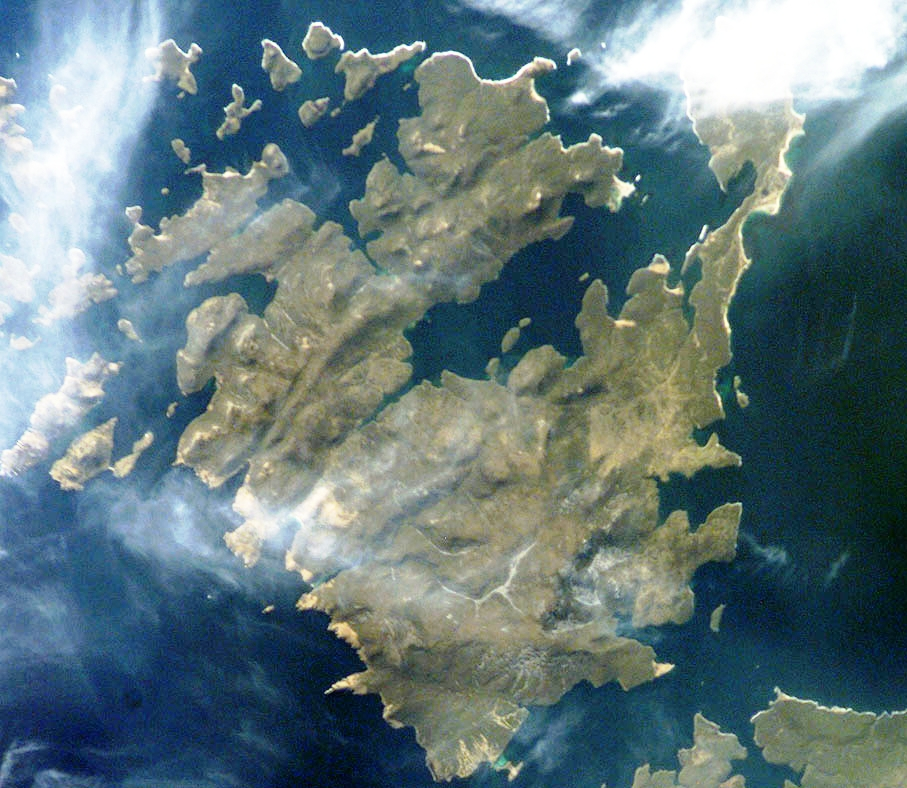
- Satellite image of Weddell Island

- Penn Island shown within the Falkland Islands
- Coordinates: 51.788°S 61.149°W
- Country: Falkland Islands
- Time zone: UTC−3 (FKST)
- If shown, area and population ranks are for all islands and all inhabited islands in the Falklands respectively.

Penn Island is an uninhabited island of the Weddell Island Group in the Falkland Islands. It lies north of Weddell Island, northeast of Beaver Island and west of Barclay Island.

== Maps ==
- The Falkland Islands. Scale 1:401280 map. London: Edward Stanford, 1901
- Falkland Islands Explorer Map. Scale 1:365000. Ocean Explorer Maps, 2007
- Falklands Topographic Map Series. Scale 1:50000, 29 sheets. DOS 453, 1961-1979
- Falkland Islands. Scale 1:643000 Map. DOS 906. Edition 3-OS, 1998
- Map 500k--xm20-4. 1:500000 map of Weddell Island and part of West Falkland. Russian Army Maps (for the world)
