= Governor Island, Falkland Islands =

Governor Island
- Island
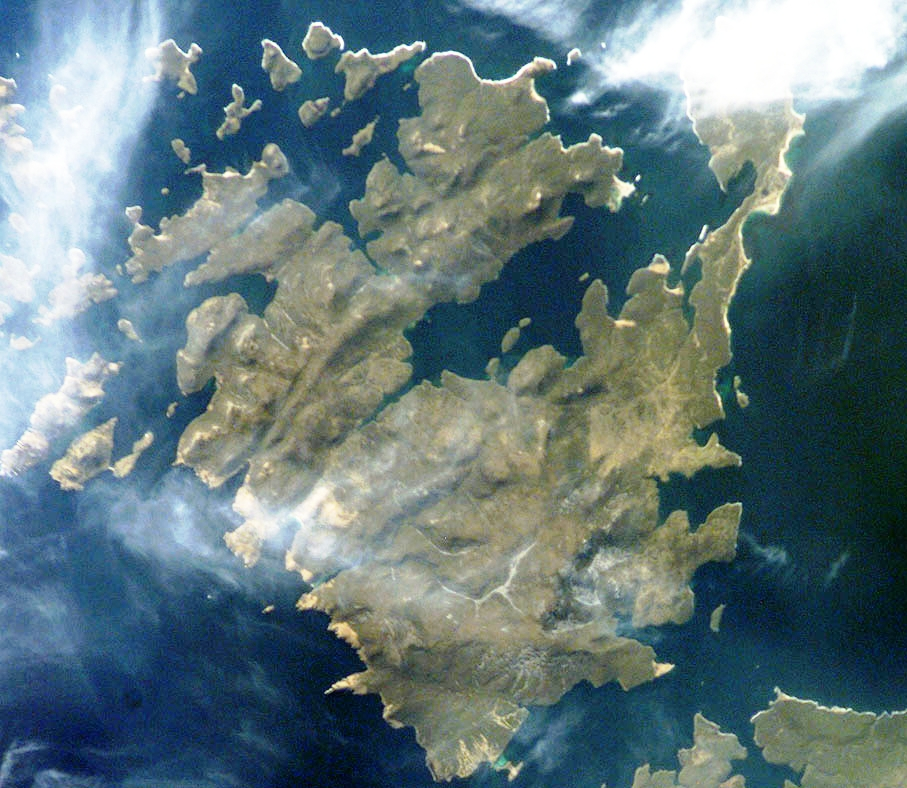
- Satellite image of Weddell Island

- Governor Island shown within the Falkland Islands
- Coordinates: 51.857°S 61.186°W
- Country: Falkland Islands

Area
  - Total: 2.2 km^{2} (0.85 sq mi)
- Time zone: UTC−3 (FKST)
- If shown, area and population ranks are for all islands and all inhabited islands in the Falklands respectively.

Governor Island is an uninhabited island of the Beaver Island Group in the Falkland Islands. It lies between Beaver Island and Weddell Island, north of Staats Island and is 220 hectares (544 acres) in area.

== Maps ==
- The Falkland Islands. Scale 1:401280 map. London: Edward Stanford, 1901
- Falkland Islands Explorer Map. Scale 1:365000. Ocean Explorer Maps, 2007
- Falklands Topographic Map Series. Scale 1:50000, 29 sheets. DOS 453, 1961-1979
- Falkland Islands. Scale 1:643000 Map. DOS 906. Edition 3-OS, 1998
- Map 500k--xm20-4. 1:500000 map of Weddell Island and part of West Falkland. Russian Army Maps (for the world)
