= Pitt Heights =

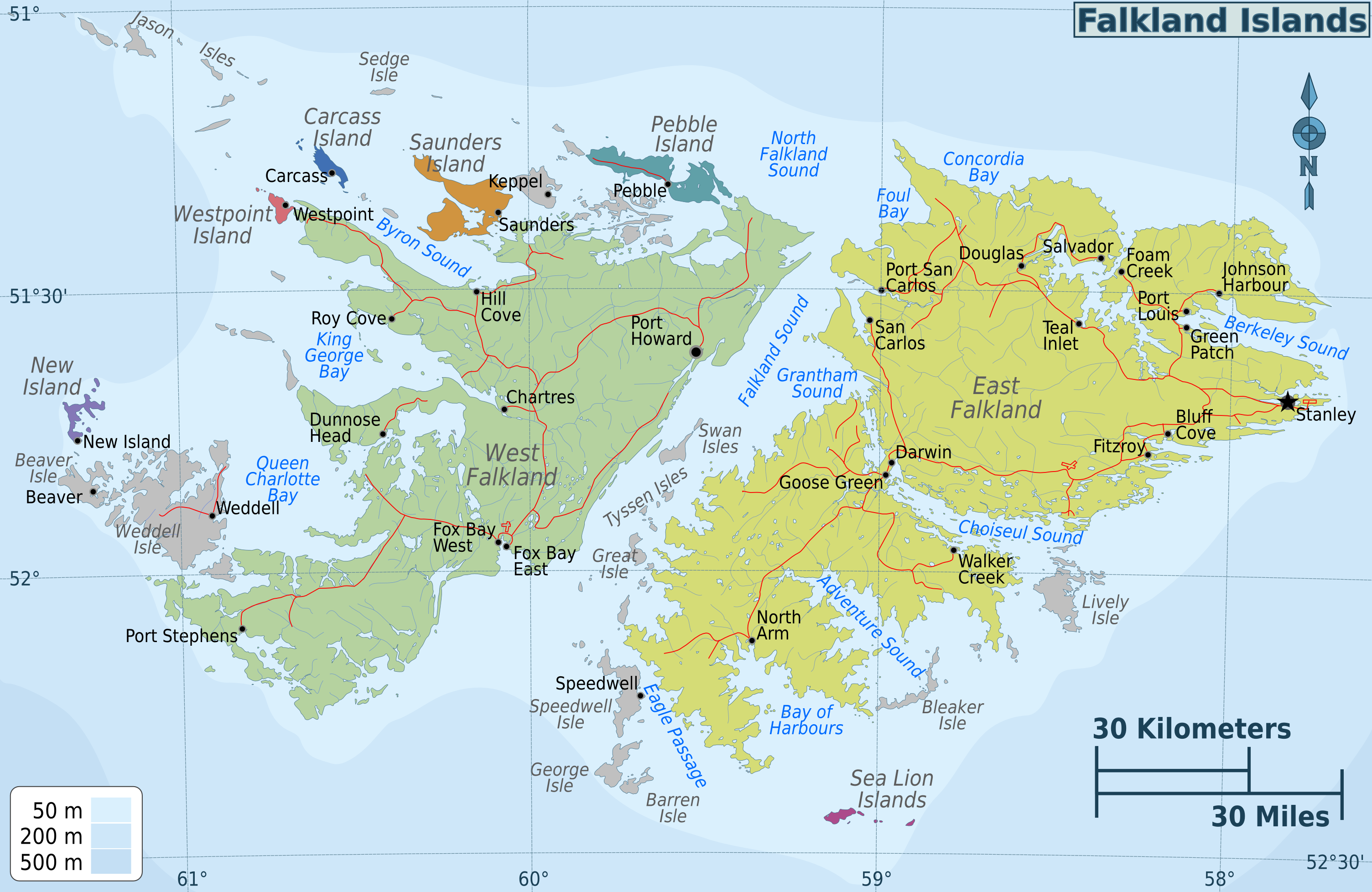
Location of Weddell Island in the Falkland Islands

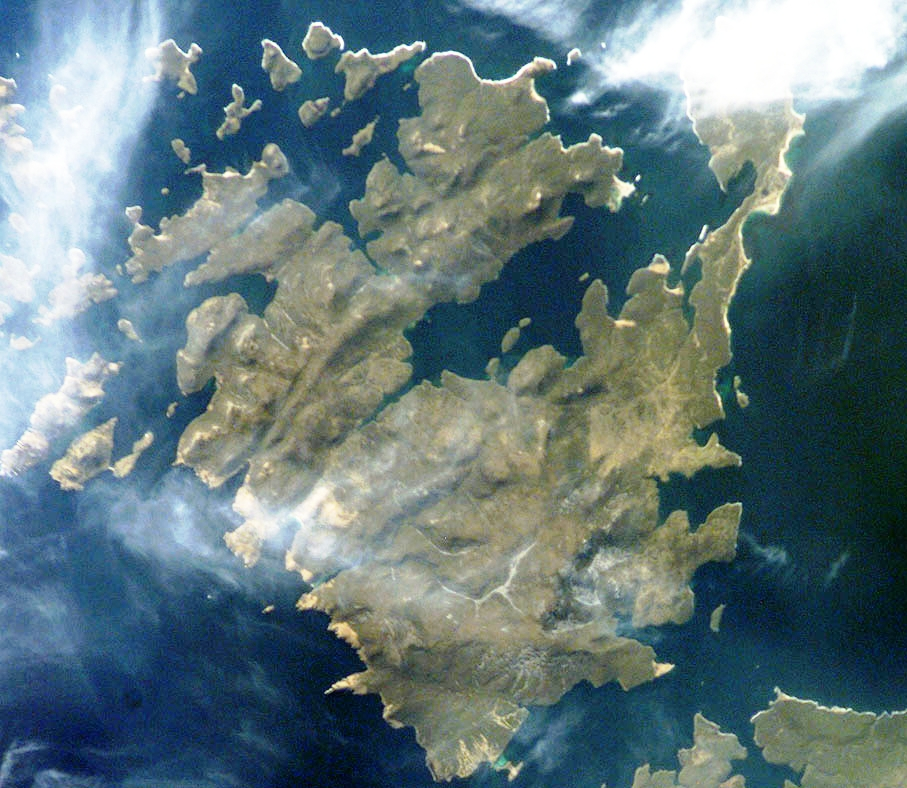
Satellite image of Weddell Island

Pitt Heights occupy the northwestern interior of Weddell Island in the Falkland Islands. The feature extends 7.5 km (4.7 mi) in southwest–northeast direction and 6.8 km (4.2 mi) in southeast–northwest direction, rising to 240 m (790 ft). Hotham Heights are centred at 51°49′05″S 61°00′30″W.

== Maps ==
- The Falkland Islands. Scale 1:401280 map. London: Edward Stanford, 1901
- Falkland Islands Explorer Map. Scale 1:365000. Ocean Explorer Maps, 2007
- Falklands Topographic Map Series. Scale 1:50000, 29 sheets. DOS 453, 1961-1979
- Falkland Islands. Scale 1:643000 Map. DOS 906. Edition 3-OS, 1998
- Map 500k--xm20-4. 1:500000 map of Weddell Island and part of West Falkland. Russian Army Maps (for the world)
- Approaches to the Falkland Islands. Scale 1:1500000 chart. Gps Nautical Charts, 2010
- Illustrated Map of Weddell Island

== Gallery ==
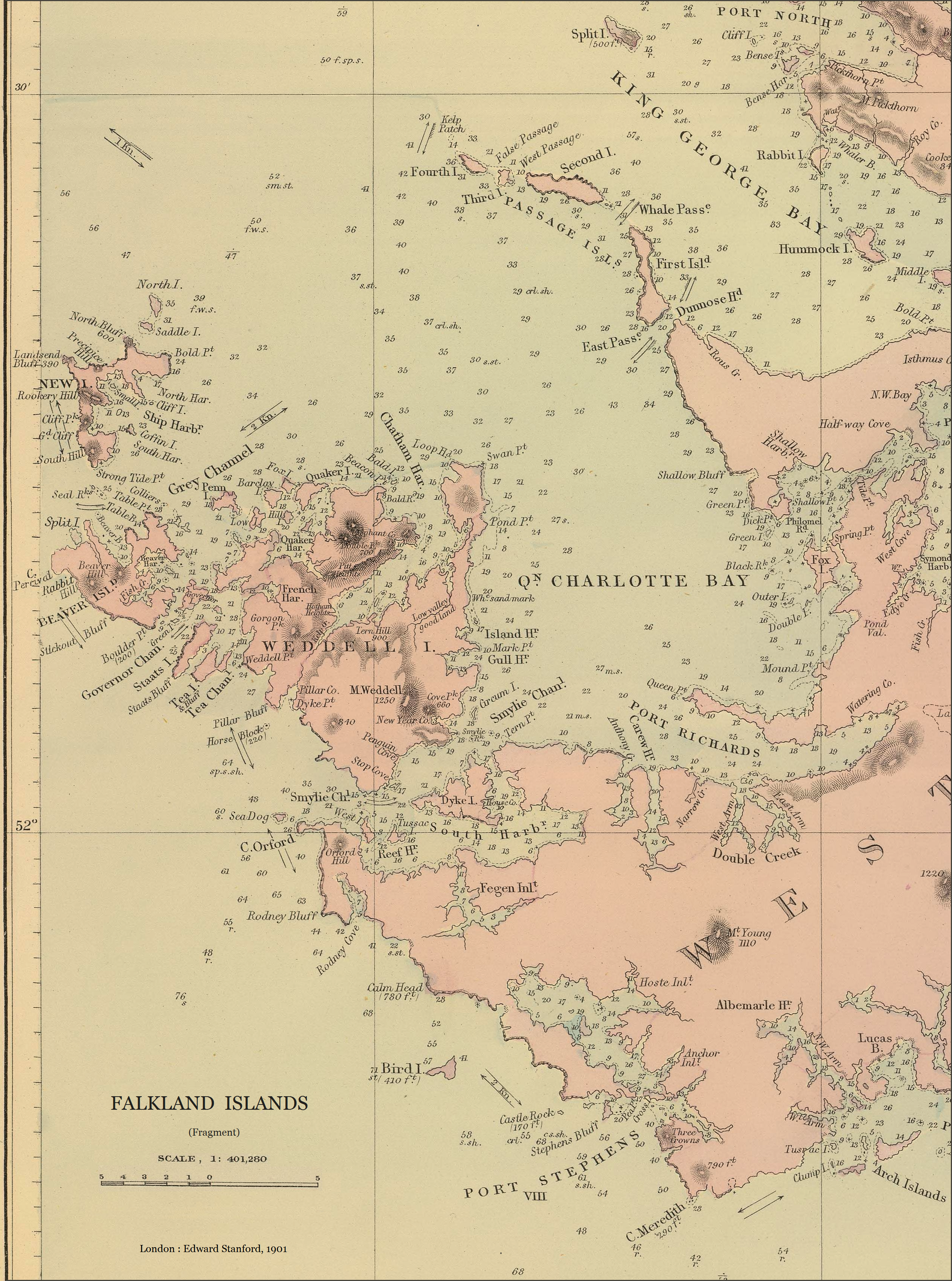
Old map of Weddell Island featuring Chatham Harbour

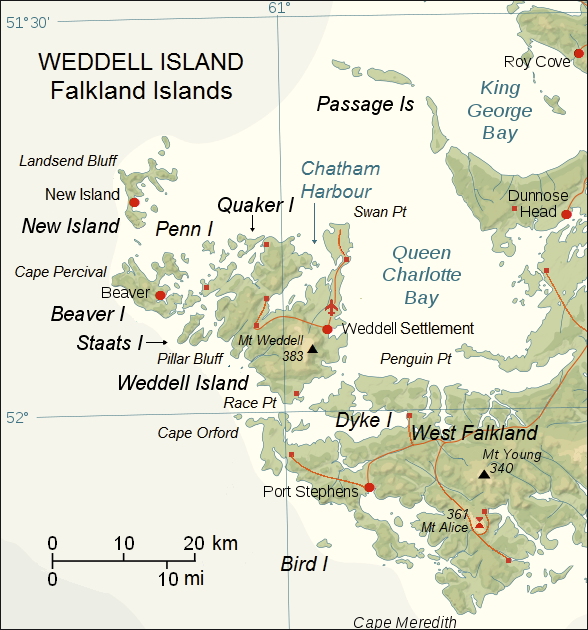
Map of Weddell Island
