= Île des Cygnes =

Île des Cygnes may refer to:

- Île des Cygnes (former island) in Paris
- another French name for Mauritius

== See also ==
- Cygne (disambiguation)
- Swan Island (disambiguation)
