= Marais des Cygnes =

Marais des Cygnes (Swans marsh in English) may refer to:

- Marais des Cygnes massacre prior to the American Civil War
- Marais des Cygnes Massacre Memorial Park a Kansas state historic site near that commemorates the 1858 massacre of the same name
- Battle of Marais des Cygnes during the American Civil War
- Marais des Cygnes National Wildlife Refuge in Kansas in the United States
- Marais des Cygnes River in Kansas and Missouri in the United States

== See also ==
- Marais (disambiguation)
- Cygnes (disambiguation)
