= Weddell Lake =

- Location within Antarctica
- Coordinates: 68°33′04″S 78°06′14″E
- Country: Antarctica

Weddell Lake is a lake in the valley which extends south from Weddell Arm on Broad Peninsula, Vestfold Hills on Princess Elizabeth Land in Antarctica. The lake was one of several lakes investigated by ANARE biologists wintering at Davis Station in 1974.
