= Le Cygne (journal) =

- Discipline: Medieval studies
- Language: English
- Edited by: Glyn S. Burgess

Publication details
- History: 1999-present
- Publisher: International Marie de France Society
- Frequency: Annual

Standard abbreviations
- ISO 4: Cygne

Indexing
- ISSN: 1087-9501

Links
- Journal homepage

Le Cygne: Journal of the International Marie de France Society (ISSN 1087-9501) is a scholarly journal, published annually in the fall, by the International Marie de France Society. The journal's publishes two to three articles in each volume except for special issues and the primary focus is Marie de France, her works, and the anonymous lays.

It is included in the Modern Language Association International Bibliography database.
