= Weddell Arm =

Weddell Arm (68°32′S 78°7′E) is the southernmost and westernmost arm of Langnes Fjord in the Vestfold Hills. Mapped by Norwegian cartographers from air photos taken by the Lars Christensen Expedition, 1936–37. Visited in 1955 and 1957 by ANARE (Australian National Antarctic Research Expeditions) parties and so named because they found large numbers of Weddell seals in the area.
