= Weddell =

Weddell may refer to:

== People ==
- Weddell (surname)

== Places ==
=== South Atlantic ===
- Weddell Glacier on South Georgia Island in the South Atlantic Ocean
- Weddell Island, one of the Falkland Islands in the South Atlantic Ocean
- Weddell Islands, in the South Orkney Islands
- Weddell Point, on South Georgia Island
- Weddell Point, Weddell Island in the Falkland Islands
- Weddell Settlement, on Weddell Island in the Falkland Islands

=== Weddell Sea ===
- Weddell Sea, near Antarctica south of the Atlantic Ocean
- Weddell Gyre, an ocean current in the Weddell Sea
- Weddell Plain, an undersea abyssal plain
- Weddell Polynya, an area of water surrounded by sea ice in the Weddell Sea

=== Elsewhere ===
- Weddell, Northern Territory, a locality in Australia

== See also ==
- Weddell seal, Antarctic seal, most southerly distribution of any mammal
- Weddle, another surname
- Wedel (disambiguation)
