= Weddell (surname) =

Weddell is a surname, and may refer to:

- Alan Weddell (born 1950), American football player and coach
- Alexander W. Weddell (1876–1948), American diplomat
- James Weddell (1787–1834), British sailor and polar explorer
- John Weddell (1583–1642), English sea captain
- Mimi Weddell (1915–2009), American actress
- Robert Weddell (1882–1951), Australian soldier and government administrator
- William Weddell (1736–1792), English landowner and politician

== See also ==
- Wedel (surname)
- Weddle
- Wedl
