= Wedl =

Wedl is a surname. Notable people with the surname include:

- Brennan Wedl (born 1997), American indie musician
- Carl Wedl (1815–1891), Austrian pathologist
- Lukas Wedl (born 1995), Austrian footballer

== See also ==
- Wedel (surname)
- Weddle
- Weddell
