= List of bodhrán players =

This is a list of bodhrán players, people known for playing the bodhrán.

- Alexander James Adams
- Maggie Boyle
- Ronnie Browne of The Corries
- Cormac Byrne, Uiscedwr, Seth Lakeman and others
- Bobby Clancy of The Clancy Brothers
- Kevin Conneff of The Chieftains
- Caroline Corr of The Corrs
- Aimee Farrell Courtney, winner of the 2010 World Bodhrán Championship, first woman to win this title
- Kevin Crawford of Lúnasa
- Junior Davey, 5 times All-Ireland winner 1990/1993/1996/1997/1999
- Tate Donovan American actor and director playing with the traditional Irish band, The Descendant
- Chrigel Glanzmann of Eluveitie
- Jackie Moran of Comas, Liz Carroll and Larry Nugent
- Elayne Harrington, rapper
- Tommy Hayes of Stockton's Wing
- John Joe Kelly of Flook
- Seamus Kennedy
- Dave King of Flogging Molly
- Dónal Lunny
- Tommy Makem
- Paddy Moloney
- Séan McCann of Canadian Folk/Roots band Great Big Sea - 1993 to present
- Johnny ("Ringo") McDonagh of De Dannan
- Peadar Mercier (1914-1991), formerly of The Chieftains and other bands
- Ruth Moody of The Wailin' Jennys
- Christy Moore
- Colm Murphy of De Dannan; tutor in bodhrán at University College, Cork, Ireland
- Fergus O'Byrne
- Mike Oldfield
- Liam Ó Maonlaí
- Seán Ó Riada
- Rónán Ó Snodaigh of Kíla
- Paul Phillips (1959–2007), player and teacher, All-Ireland winner 2003
- Debi Smith
- Leah Song of Rising Appalachia
- Chris Weddle
- Bill Whelan
- Roy Williamson
- Shane MacGowan (1957–2023)
- Ruairi Glasheen
- Niels Aaboe (also a piper)

== See also ==
- List of All-Ireland Fleadh champions
