= Pillar Bluff =

Headland in the Falkland Islands

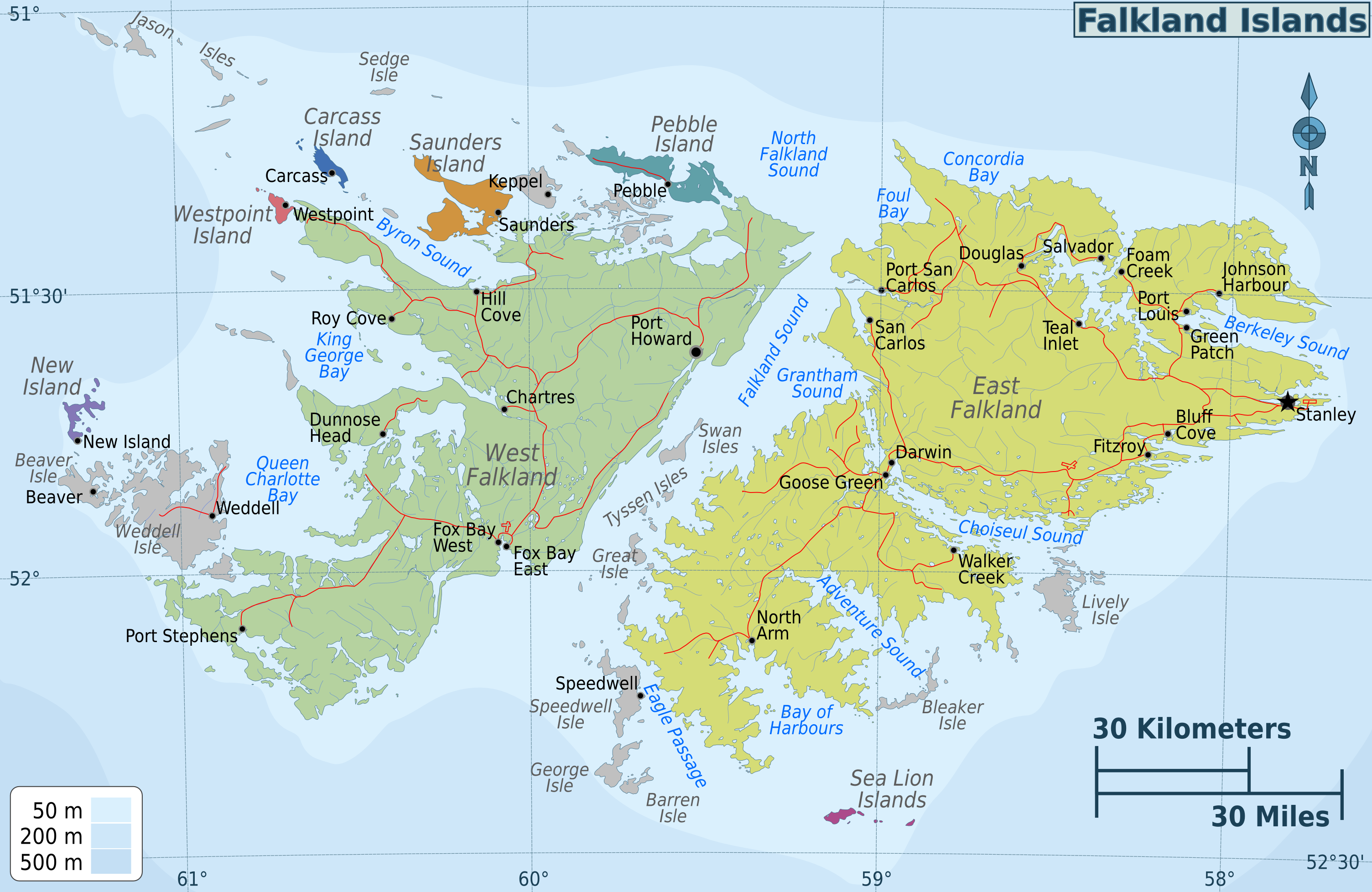
Location of Weddell Island in the Falkland Islands

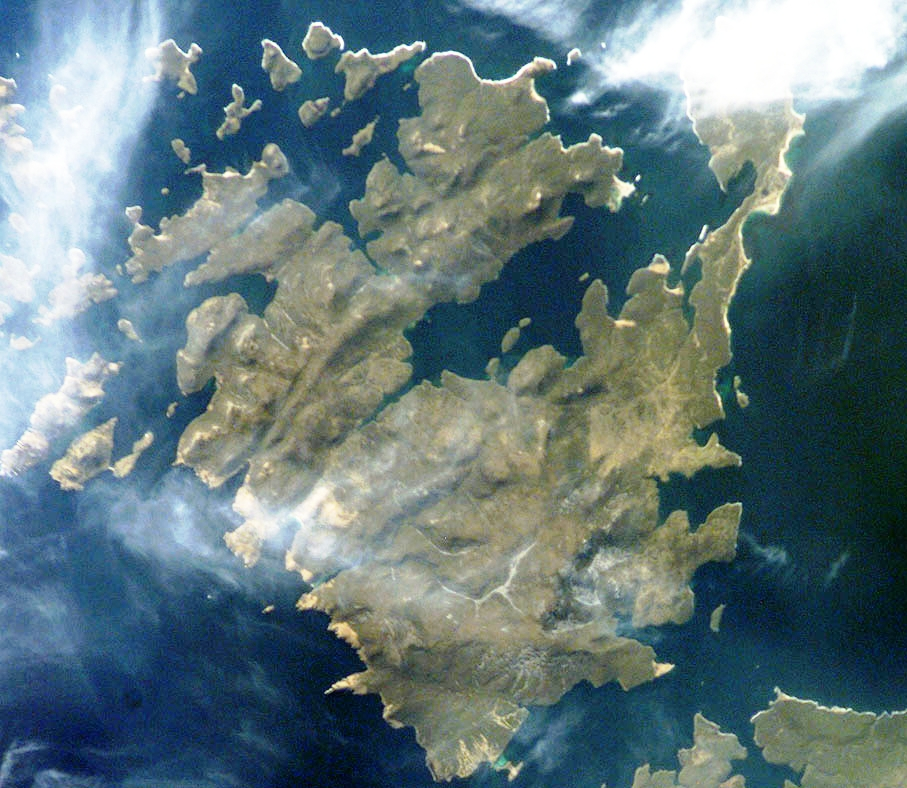
Satellite image of Weddell Island

Pillar Bluff is a headland projecting 1.1 km from the southwest coast of Weddell Island in the Falkland Islands and forming the west side of the entrance to Pillar Cove. It is located at 51°55′47″S 61°05′44″W, which is 9.3 km northwest of Race Point, 1.8 km northeast of Horse Block, 4 km southeast of Weddell Point and 9.8 km west of Mount Weddell.

== Maps ==
- The Falkland Islands. Scale 1:401280 map. London: Edward Stanford, 1901
- Falkland Islands Explorer Map. Scale 1:365000. Ocean Explorer Maps, 2007
- Falklands Topographic Map Series. Scale 1:50000, 29 sheets. DOS 453, 1961-1979
- Falkland Islands. Scale 1:643000 Map. DOS 906. Edition 3-OS, 1998
- Map 500k--xm20-4. 1:500000 map of Weddell Island and part of West Falkland. Russian Army Maps (for the world)
- Approaches to the Falkland Islands. Scale 1:1500000 chart. Gps Nautical Charts, 2010
- Illustrated Map of Weddell Island

== Gallery ==
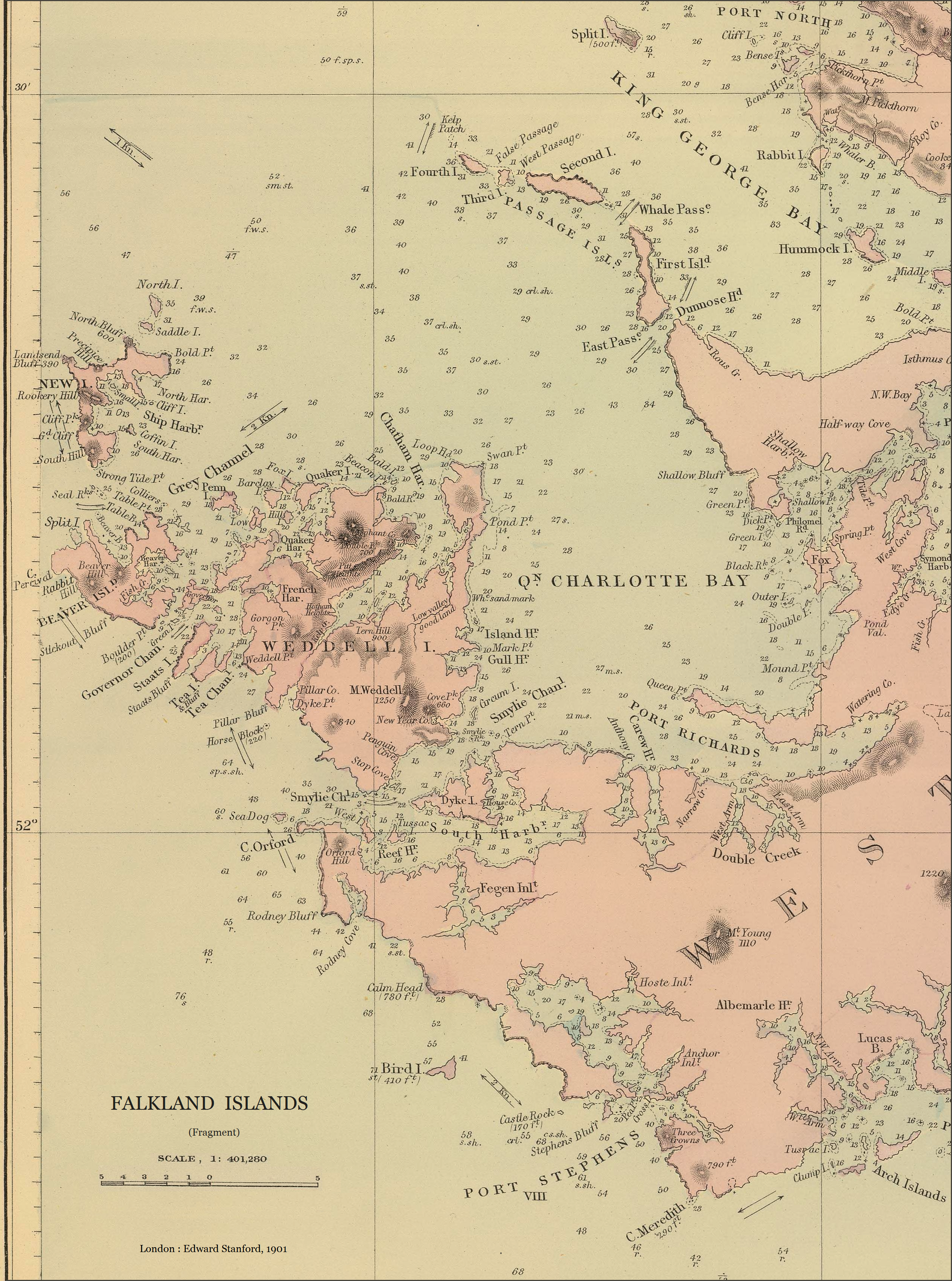
Old map of Weddell Island featuring Pillar Bluff

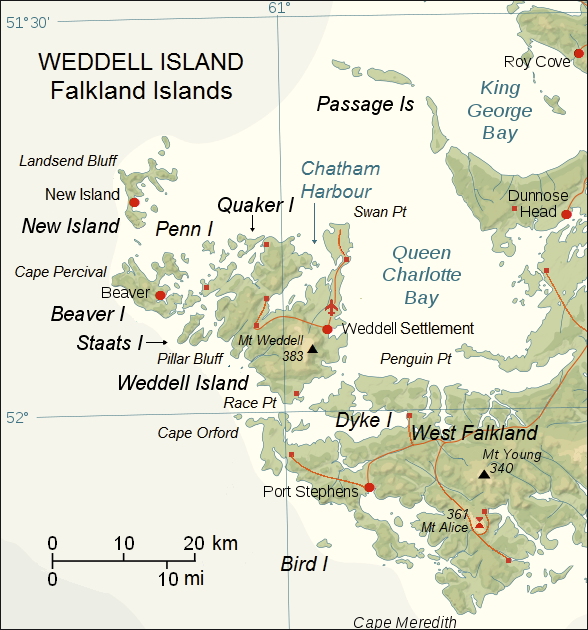
Map of Weddell Island
