= Jane (1818 ship) =

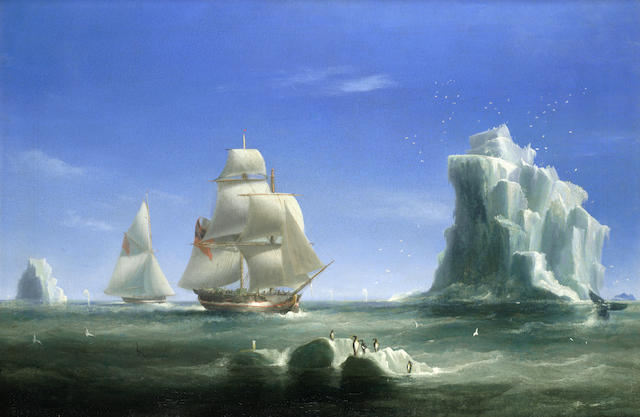
- The brig Jane and cutter Beaufoy in the James Weddell Antarctic Expedition 1823; attributed to William John Huggins (British, 1781-1845)

History

United Kingdom
- Name: Jane
- Acquired: 1818
- Fate: Condemned 1829

General characteristics
- Tons burthen: 154 (bm)

Jane was an American vessel launched in 1810 or 1812 and taken in prize, first appearing in British registers in 1818. She then became a whaler. Under the command of Captain James Weddell she explored the area around the South Shetland Islands and in 1823 reached the southernmost point ever reached until then. From about 1825 on she traded generally as a merchantman until she was condemned in 1829.

== Career ==
Jane first appeared in Lloyd's Register (LR) in 1818 with Petterson, master, Stranger, owner, and trade Yarmouth–Straits [of Gibraltar]. She was described as an American prize. James Strachan (not "Stranger") was a shipbuilder in North Leith, a partner in "Strachan & Gavin" shipbuilders. Strachan and James Mitchell, a Scottish insurance broker living in London, owned Jane.

1st whaling voyage (1818–1819): Jane sailed from London on 21 April 1818, and returned on 19 January 1819, with 325 casks of whale oil.

The 1819 volume of LR showed her master as Petterson, changing to J.Beddell, her owner as Strachan, and her trade as London–Gibraltar, changing to London–South Seas. "J.Beddell" was actually James Weddell, a former Royal Navy officer. Strachan engaged Weddell to take Jane whaling.

In 1820, news of the discovery of the South Shetland Islands had just broken, and Weddell suggested that fortunes might be made in the new sealing grounds.

2nd whaling voyage (1820–1821): Captain James Weddell sailed Jane, of or from Greenock, for the South Shetland Islands on 28 July 1820. Jane returned to Britain on 13 April 1821, with a full cargo of 220 tons of whale oil.

Weddell's first voyage as captain of Jane was so profitable that Strachan and Mitchell acquired a second ship, Beaufoy. She was a small (66 tons burthen) sloop that they either built, or that had been built in 1803 at Dover and that they bought.

3rd whaling voyage (1821–1822): Captain Weddell, by now a part-owner in Jane, sailed on 13 July 1821 for the South Shetland Islands. Jane, Waddell, master, and her tender, Beaufoy, were reported to have been at New South Shetland on 3 February with 800 seal skins and 60 tons of oil. However, there were some 45 sealers operating in the area, and seal were already becoming rare (a mere two years after the discovery of the islands), and so he scouted for new hunting grounds. Michael McCleod, captain of Beaufoy, sighted the South Orkney Islands on 22 November 1821, an independent discovery from that of Powell and Palmer just a few days earlier. Waddell returned on 19 July 1822 with 145 casks of oil and 1,200 seal skins.

4th whaling voyage (1822–1823): Jane and Beaufoy sailed from Gravesend on 13 September 1822, bound for the South Seas. Jane had just been sheathed, coppered and repaired. However, while Jane was lying at anchor in the Downs, Susannah of Star Cross ran into her, damaging Jane's bowsprit, sails, and rigging. After these had been replaced, Jane proceeded on 17 September on her journey to the New South Shetland Islands. On her way to Patagonia and South Shetland, Jane called at Madeira.

Beaufoy, Matthew Brisbane, master, sailed with Jane. Sealing proved disappointing, though, and after searching for land between the South Shetlands and the South Orkneys (and not finding any), they turned south in the hope to better sealing ground there. The season was unusually mild and tranquil, and on 20 February 1823, the two ships had reached 74°15′00″S 34°16′45″W. This was the southernmost position any ship had ever reached up to that time. They sighted a few icebergs but no land. Weddell theorized that the sea continued as far as the South Pole but two days' sailing would have brought him to Coats Land (to the east of the Weddell Sea. Instead, Weddell decided to turn back.

Jane returned to Britain on 17 July 1824, from the South Seas and Montevideo with 60 (or 66) casks of oil, 3,076 seal skins, 14 leopard seal skins, plus hides and horns. The seal skins fetched between ten and 21 shillings each. The hides and horns came from Montevideo.

After Jane's return Strachan had her repaired and employed her as a merchantman.

Year	Master	Owner	Trade	Source & notes
1825	Orniston	Strachan	London–Quebec	LR; small repairs 1821
1825	Prinston; Riddle	Straghan	London–Madeira	RS; small repairs 1824
1826	Riddle	Mitchell & Co.	London–Jamaica	LR; small repairs 1821 and repairs 1824
1827	Riddle; Mullers	Mitchell & Co.	London–Smyrna	LR; small repairs 1821
1827	Riddle	Straghan	London–Smyrna	RS; small repairs 1824
1829	Mallers	Mitchell	London–Madeira	RS; small repairs 1824
1829	T.Mallas; J.Waddle	Mitchell & Co.	London–Madeira	LR; small repairs 1821
1833	Mallers	Mitchell	London–Madeira	RS; small repairs 1824

== Fate ==
LL reported on 7 July 1829 that Jane, Weddell, master, had been condemned at Fayal. It again reported on 20 April 1830 that Jane, Weddell, master (late), had been condemned at Fayal.

On her passage from Buenos Aires to Gibraltar Jane had leaked so badly that she had to be given up at the Azores. Weddell and his cargo were transferred to another ship for the passage to England, but this ran aground on the island of Pica, and Weddell only barely survived. (Note: The wrecked vessel was almost certainly Swallow, of 164 tons burthen. She was wrecked on 11 July 1829 off Pica Island, with the loss of a crew member. She was on a voyage from Faial to Plymouth, Devon.) He later was master of Eliza, and died in 1834.
