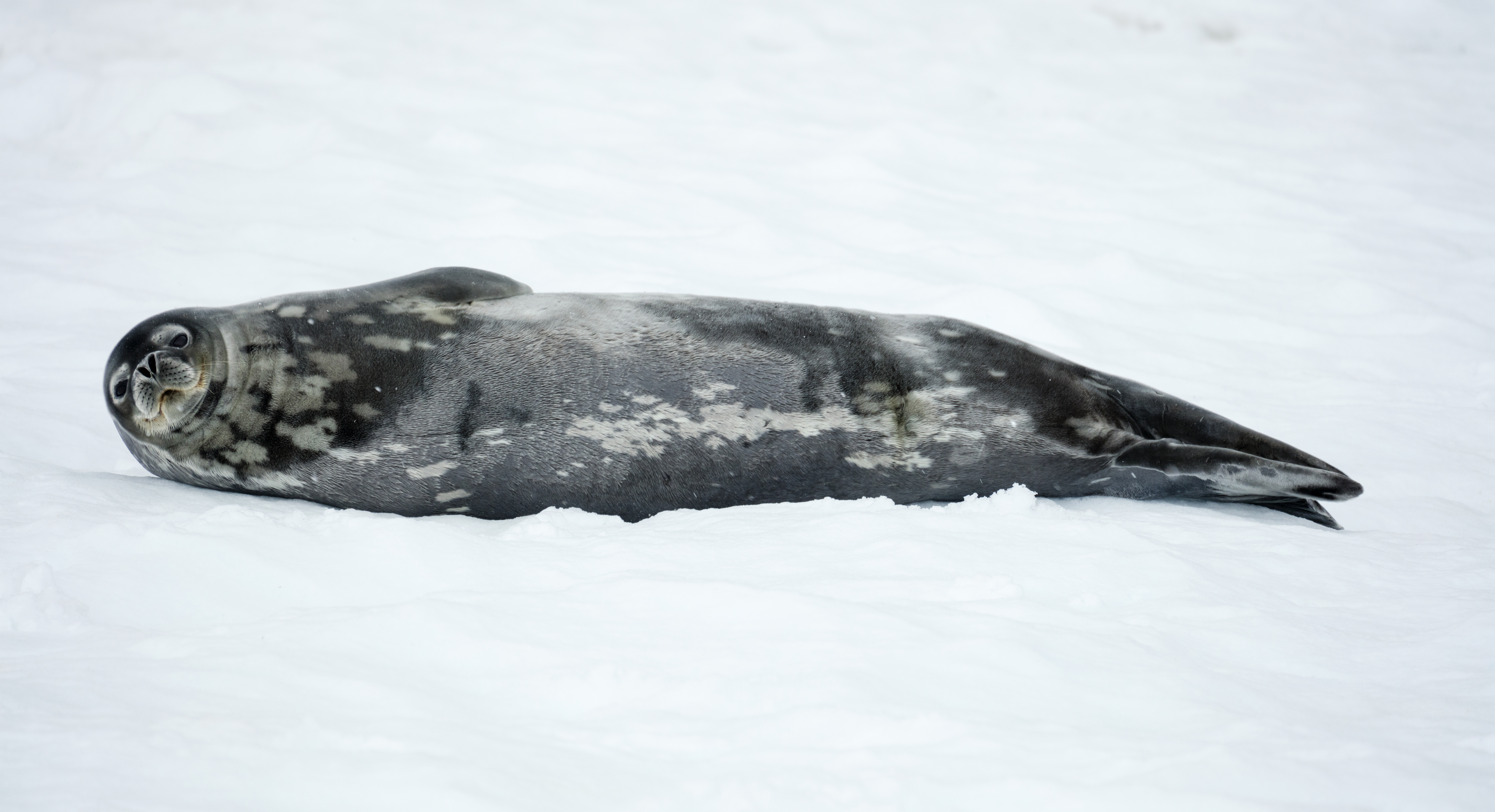
- At D'Hainaut Island, Mikkelsen Harbour, Trinity Island

Conservation status
- Least Concern (IUCN 3.1)

Scientific classification
- Kingdom: Animalia
- Phylum: Chordata
- Class: Mammalia
- Order: Carnivora
- Parvorder: Pinnipedia
- Family: Phocidae
- Genus: Leptonychotes; Gill, 1872
- Species: L. weddellii

Binomial name
- Leptonychotes weddellii (Lesson, 1826)
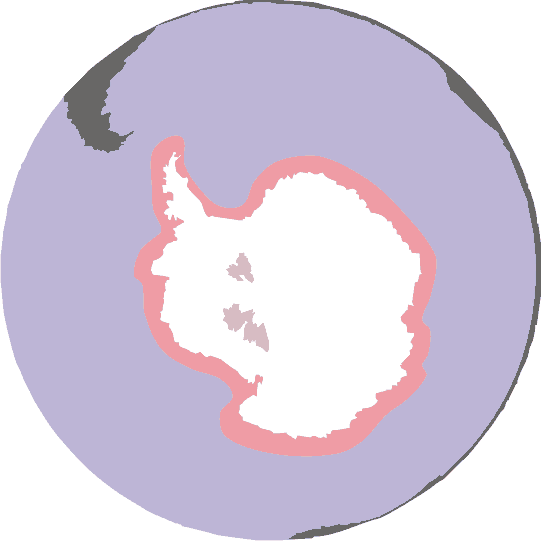
- Weddell seal range Water Ice Range

= Weddell seal =

Species of carnivore

The Weddell seal (Leptonychotes weddellii) is a relatively large and abundant true seal with a circumpolar distribution surrounding Antarctica. The Weddell seal was discovered and named in the 1820s during expeditions led by British sealing captain James Weddell to the area of the Southern Ocean now known as the Weddell Sea. The life history of this species is well documented since it occupies fast ice environments close to the Antarctic continent and often adjacent to Antarctic bases. It is the only species in the genus Leptonychotes.

== Description ==
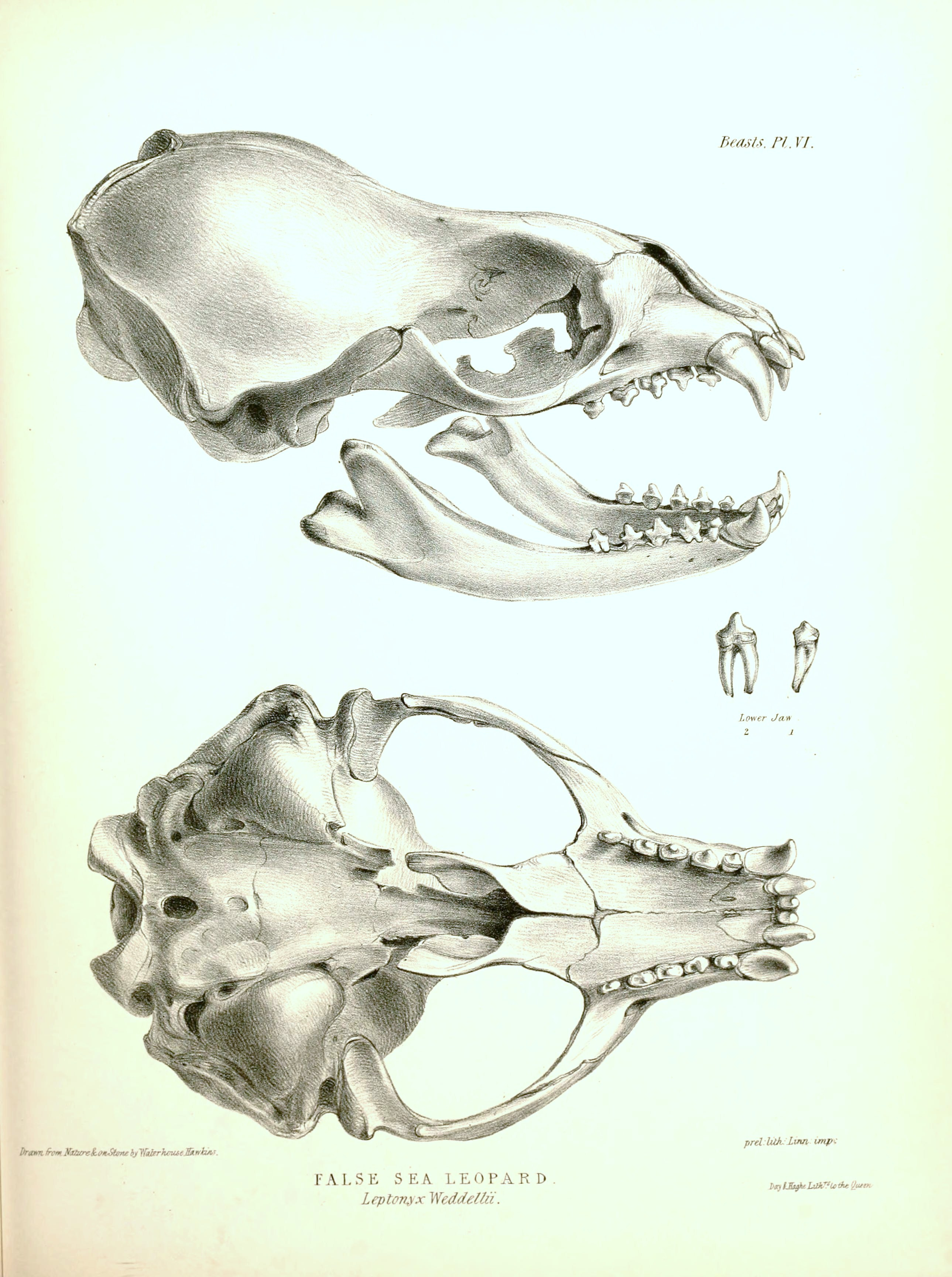
Skull

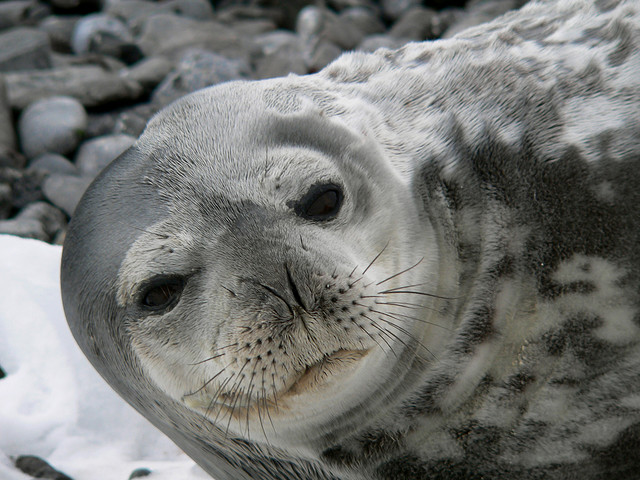
Close up of face

Weddell seals measure about 2.5–3.5 m (8 ft 2 in – 11 ft 6 in) long and weigh 400–600 kg (880–1,320 lb). They are amongst the largest seals, with a rather bulky body and short fore flippers relative to their body length. Males weigh less than females, usually about 500 kg (1,100 lb) or less. Male and female Weddell seals are generally about the same length, though females can be slightly larger. However, the male seal tends to have a thicker neck and a broader head and muzzle than the female. A molecular genetic-based technique has been established to confirm the sex of individuals in the laboratory. The Weddell seal face has been compared to that of a cat due to a short mouth line and similarities in the structure of the nose and whiskers.

The Weddell seal grows a thin fur coat around its whole body except for small areas around the flippers. The colour and pattern of the coat vary, often fading to a duller colour as the seal ages. This coat moults around the beginning of summer. Adults show a counter-shaded colouration that varies from bluish-black to dark grey dorsally and to light grey/silver ventrally. Coats may change to shades of brown before the annual moult. Adult males usually bear scars, most of them around the genital region. Weddell seal pups are born with a lanugo of similar colouration and they moult after 3–4 weeks; later, they turn a darker colour similar to that of adults. The pups are around half the length of their mother at birth and weigh 25–30 kg (55–66 lb). They gain around 2 kg (4.4 lb) a day, and by 6–7 weeks old they can weigh around 100 kg (220 lb).

== Behaviour ==
=== Movements ===
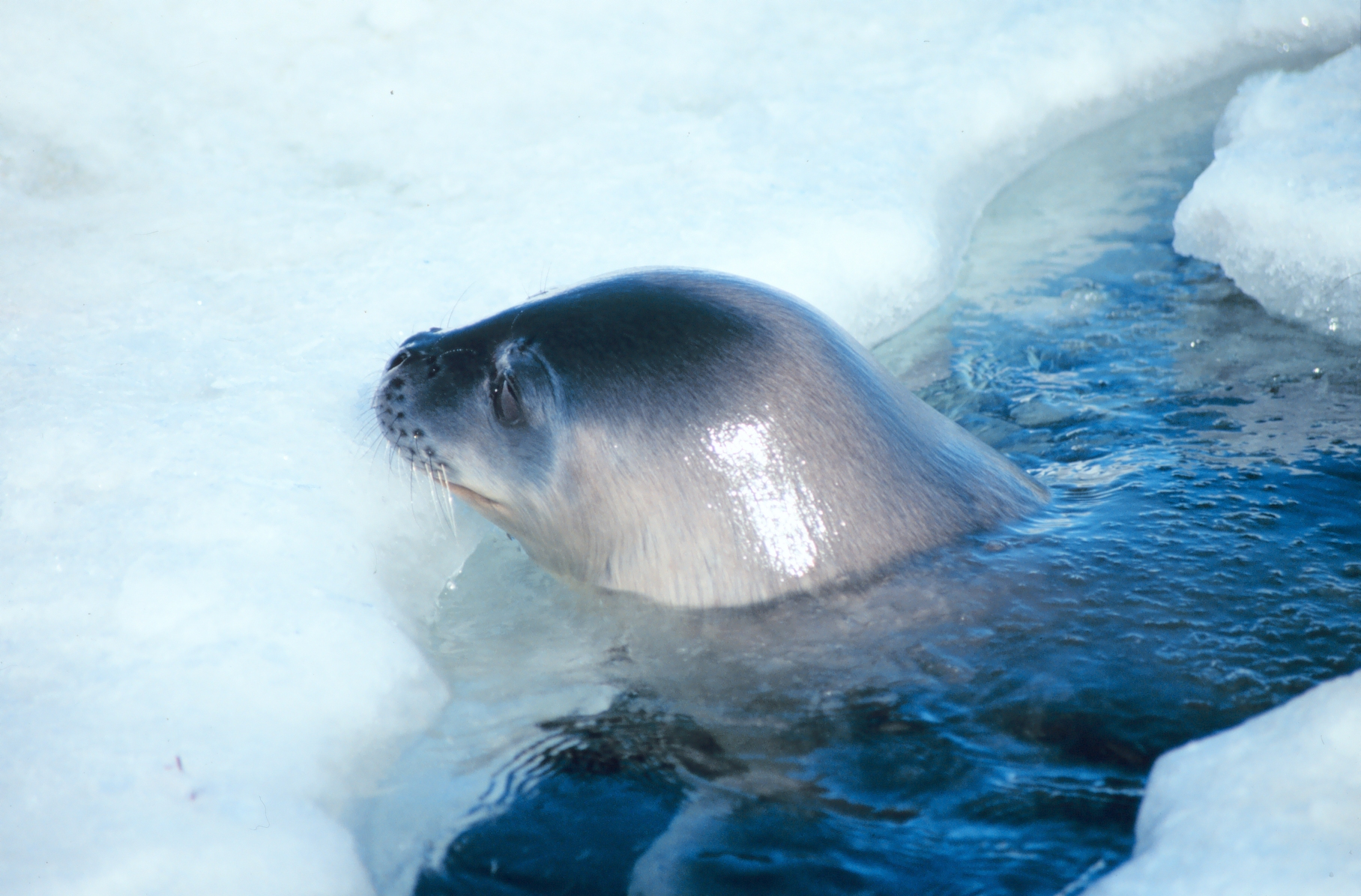
A Weddell seal at a breathing hole

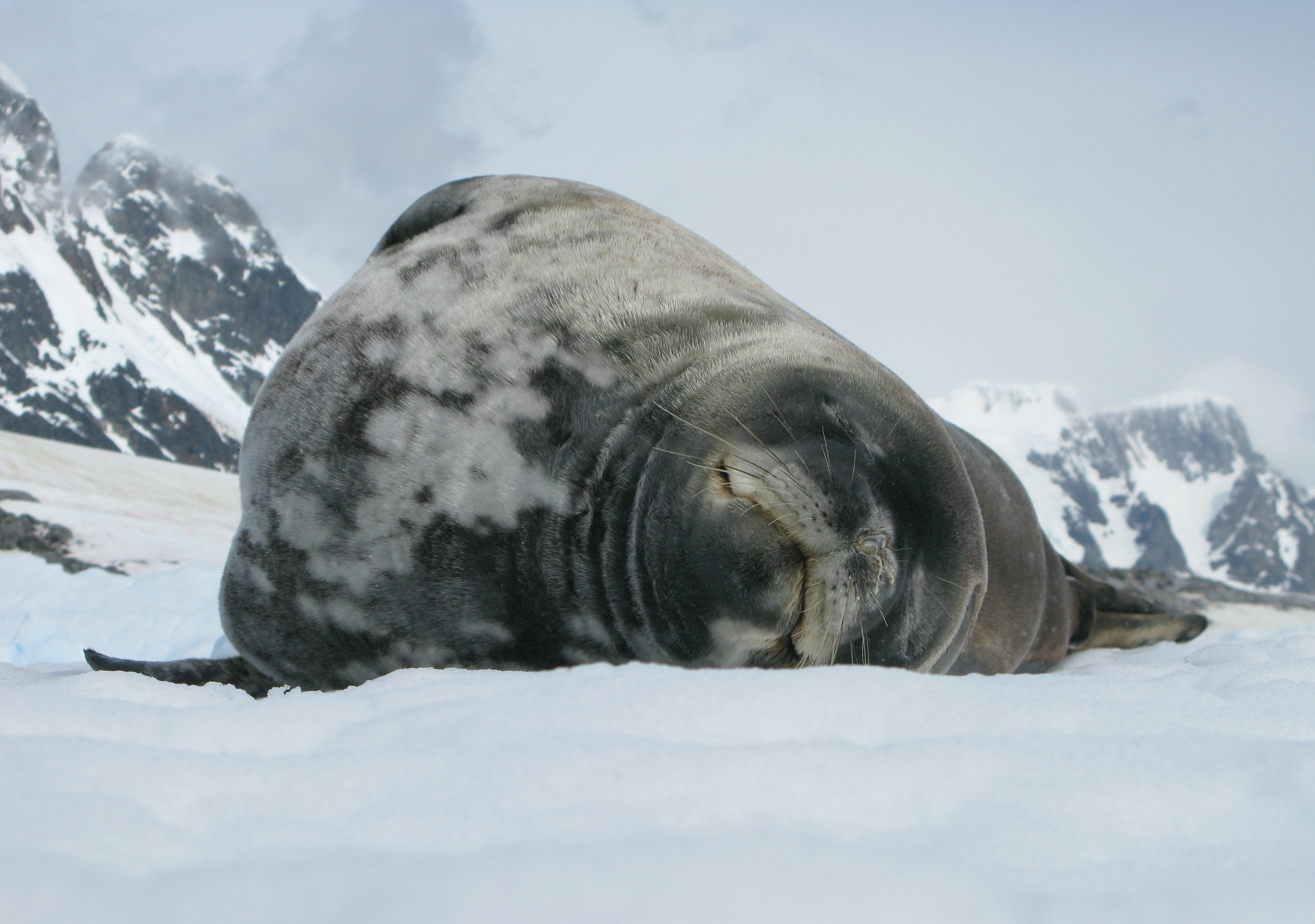
Weddell seal sleeping on Pléneau Island, Antarctica

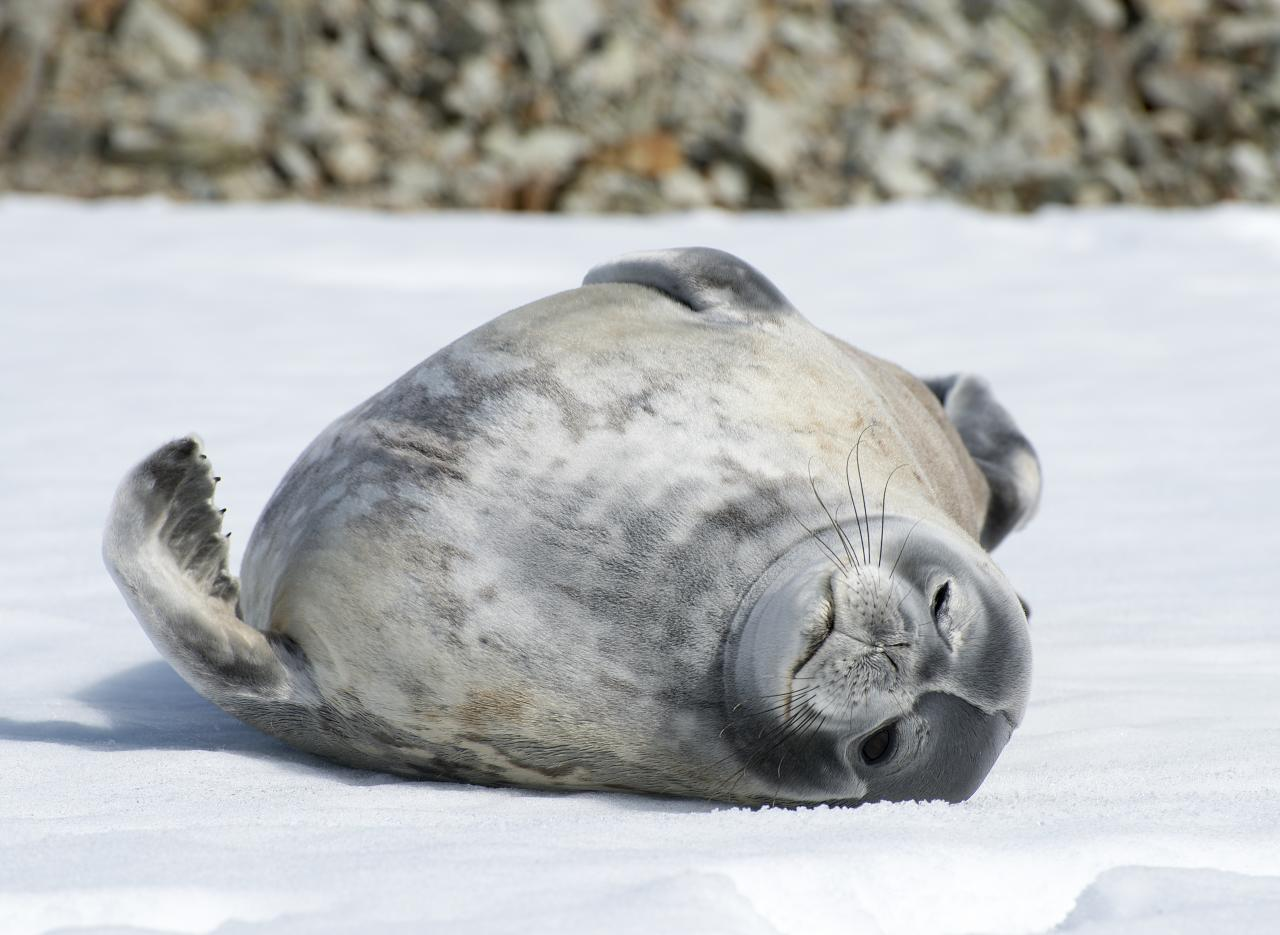
Sleeping on the snow in Antarctica

Weddell seals are commonly found on fast ice, or ice fastened to land, and gather in small groups around cracks and holes within the ice. In the winter, they stay in the water to avoid blizzards, with only their heads poking through breathing holes in the ice. These seals are often observed lying on their sides when on land. Weddell seals are non-migratory phocids (earless seal) that move regionally to follow the distribution of breathing holes and exit cracks within the ice changes between seasons. The species is primarily restricted to Antarctic waters: physical factors, such as glacial movement and tidal action, may increase fluctuations in distributions.

=== Foraging ===
Weddell seals dive to forage for food, maintain breathing holes in fast ice, and explore to find more ice holes. They have been observed to dive as deep as 600 m for up to an hour. These seals exhibit a diel dive pattern, diving deeper and longer during the day than at night. After dropping away from a breathing hole in the ice, the seals become negatively buoyant in the first 30 to 50 m (98 to 164 ft), allowing them to dive with little effort. They hunt in different parts of the water column depending on prey availability. Weddell seals hunt in both pelagic and benthic-demersal habitats.

Scientists believe Weddell seals rely mainly on eyesight to hunt for food when there is light. However, during the Antarctic winter darkness, when there is no light under the ice where the seals forage, they rely on other senses, primarily the sense of touch from their vibrissae or whiskers, which are not just hairs, but very complicated sense organs with more than 500 nerve endings that attach to the animal's snout. The hairs allow the seals to detect the wake of swimming fish and use that to capture prey.

Weddell seals are opportunistic feeders, who eat an array of fish, bottom-feeding prawns, cephalopods and crustaceans. A sedentary adult eats around 10 kg (22 lb) a day, while an active adult eats over 50 kg (110 lb) a day. Antarctic cod and silverfish constitute the majority of their diet. Cephalopods are common prey, and crustacean remains are sometimes found in Weddell seal scat, but at much lower rates than other prey species.

Although seabirds are not usually part of their diet, there have been several sightings of them chasing and killing penguins in the wild. Other Antarctic phocids are known to be seabird predators, resulting in implications that penguin hunting is a learned behaviour. There are recordings of four different penguin species being attacked by Weddell seals: a gentoo penguin, an emperor penguin, an Adélie penguin, and a chinstrap penguin. It has not been confirmed, however, if the penguins were consumed after being killed.

Weddell seals are top predators in the Antarctic. They have no natural predators when on fast ice. At sea or on pack ice, they are prey for the Antarctica's apex predators (killer whales and leopard seals) which prey primarily on juveniles and pups.

=== Breeding ===
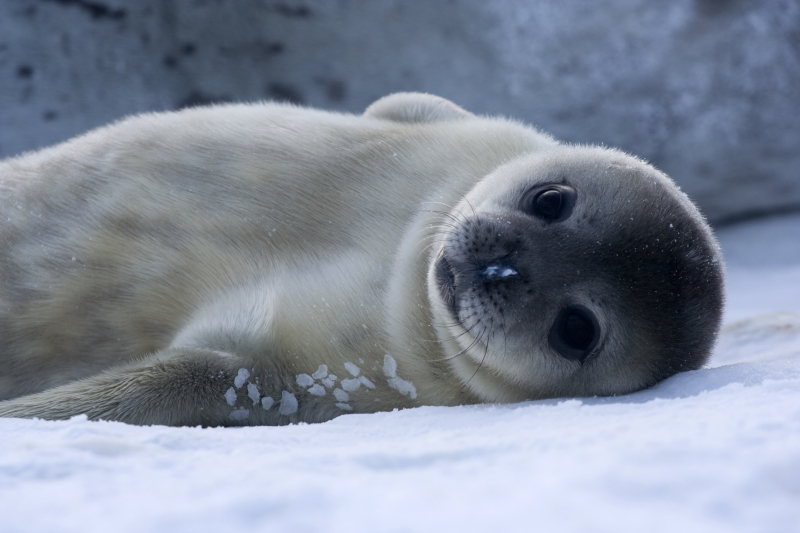
Baby Weddell seal, Adélie Land

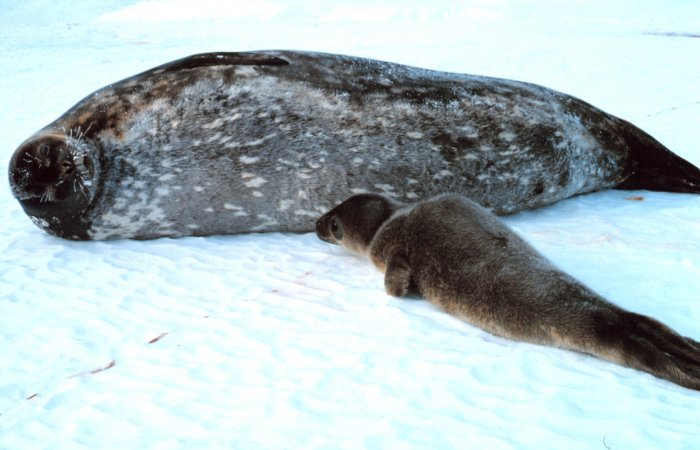
Weddell seal mother and pup

Weddell seals return to fast ice colonies during the spring for birthing and breeding. Weddell seal populations will often return to the same breeding sites over consecutive breeding seasons. Depending on the latitude it inhabits, this marine mammal gives birth from early September through November, with those living at lower latitudes giving birth earlier. Weddell seals usually give birth to one pup per year, however the Weddell seal is one of the only species of seals that can give birth to twin pups. Birthing of the pup takes only one to four minutes. Newborn pups weigh about 25–30 kg (55–66 lb) and grow to two times their weight within their first week of life. The pups take their first swim around one to two weeks of age. During the first two weeks, mother Weddell seals distinguish their pups through scent and specialised vocalisations, and stay in the same spatial area. After six to seven weeks, pups are weaned and begin to hunt independently.

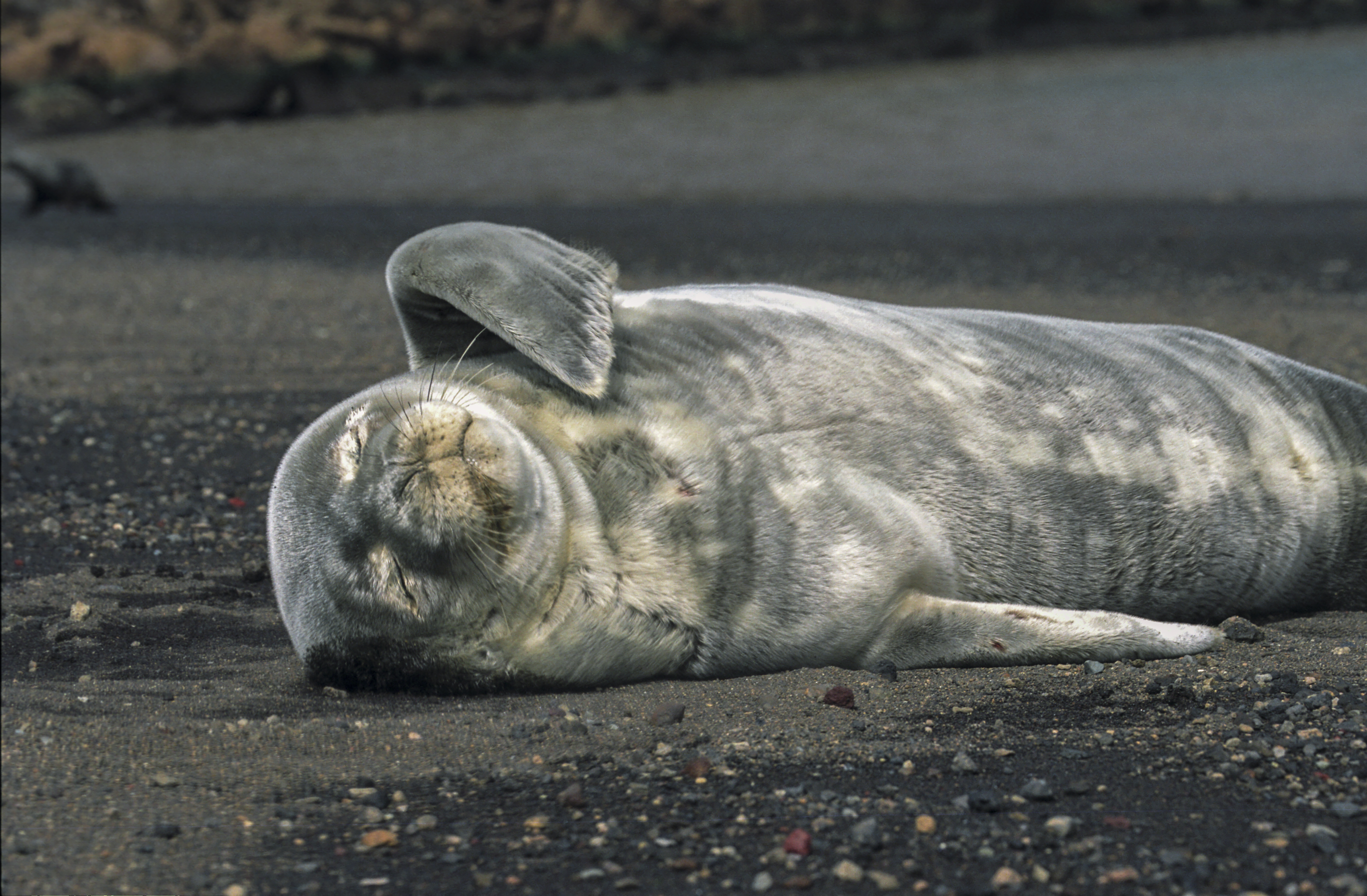
Weddell seal pup with its grey natal coat, Deception Island

Weddell seals show moderate polygyny and genetic analyses of mating success have suggested how factors such as size, diving ability, and site-specific experience enhance success in male Weddell seals. Additionally, fast ice breeding grounds cause females to cluster in large aggregations, making it easier for males to control their harem. The mating season occurs during austral spring between late November and December after pups are weaned and females begin ovulating. During the mating season, Weddell seals make noises loud enough to be felt through the ice. Males defend underwater territories during the breeding season and have been observed to fight. Copulation has only been observed to occur underwater, after the male approaches the female from the dorsal side. The female is often bitten on the neck by her partner if she tries to escape or terminate copulation. The seals are normally around six to eight years old when they first breed, but this can be much earlier for some females. Weddell seals undergo delayed implantation. The embryo is not implanted into the uterus until the beginning of austral summer, between mid-January and mid-February, allowing for birth under more favourable environmental conditions. Juvenile Weddell seals (0–2 years old) have high mortality, whereas no differences can be found between the mortality rate of animals older than 2 years and that of adults (Hastings et al., 1999). The maximum lifespan of the species is estimated at least 25 years.

Newborn Weddell seals have different thermoregulatory strategies from other species of seals. Weddell seal pups are not born with brown fat, which is used in other seal species for thermoregulation. Instead, they rely heavily on lanugo, a fine layer of hair on the surface of their skin, to keep warm. Studies also revealed high levels of enzyme activity in the muscles of newborn Weddell seals, suggesting that a primary thermoregulatory strategy of these seals includes muscle thermogenesis, or shivering. The activity of metabolic enzymes including citrate synthase, β-hydroxyacyl CoA dehydrogenase, and cytochrome c oxidase were measured and determined to be significantly active in newborn Weddell seals' longissimus dorsi, a large and major swimming muscle. Research has also suggested that pups have high mitochondrial densities in the muscle, which may serve a thermogenic role.

=== Vocalisation ===
Video of a reclining Weddell seal on pack ice in Adélie Land

Male and female Weddell seals communicate through a variety of sounds, specifically, males sometimes use "trills" to communicate. Weddell seals are also able to communicate with each other through different mediums. Weddell seals on ice can hear the calls of Weddell seals in the water as long as the noise level on land is low and they are nearby. Sound waves can be transmitted either through the ice itself or from water to breathing holes where female Weddell seals are usually breeding. There have been recordings of Weddell seal vocalisations that are described as songs. Their songs consist of repetitive sequences of the same vocal elements, and they only vary slightly over time. Individual Weddell seals can each produce their unique song, but singing behaviour is not common. Vocalisations are also important in mother–pup Weddell seal interactions. Mother Weddell seals use vocalisations to call their pups from further distances when smell can no longer be used efficiently (Opzeeland et al., 2011). Pups also use higher, more urgent vocalisations when hungry to alert their mothers to feed. Weddell seals commonly produce ultrasonic vocalizations. However, the functional significance of these high-frequency sounds is yet unknown.

== Taxonomy ==
Rice noted that the scientific name was misspelt in the past as L. weddelli and this synonym is no longer accepted, although it is still found commonly in the scientific literature before 1988.

Weddell seals can be confused with other two phocids that share the same range: Ross seal (Ommatophoca rossii) and crabeater seal (Lobodon carcinophagus).

== Population status ==
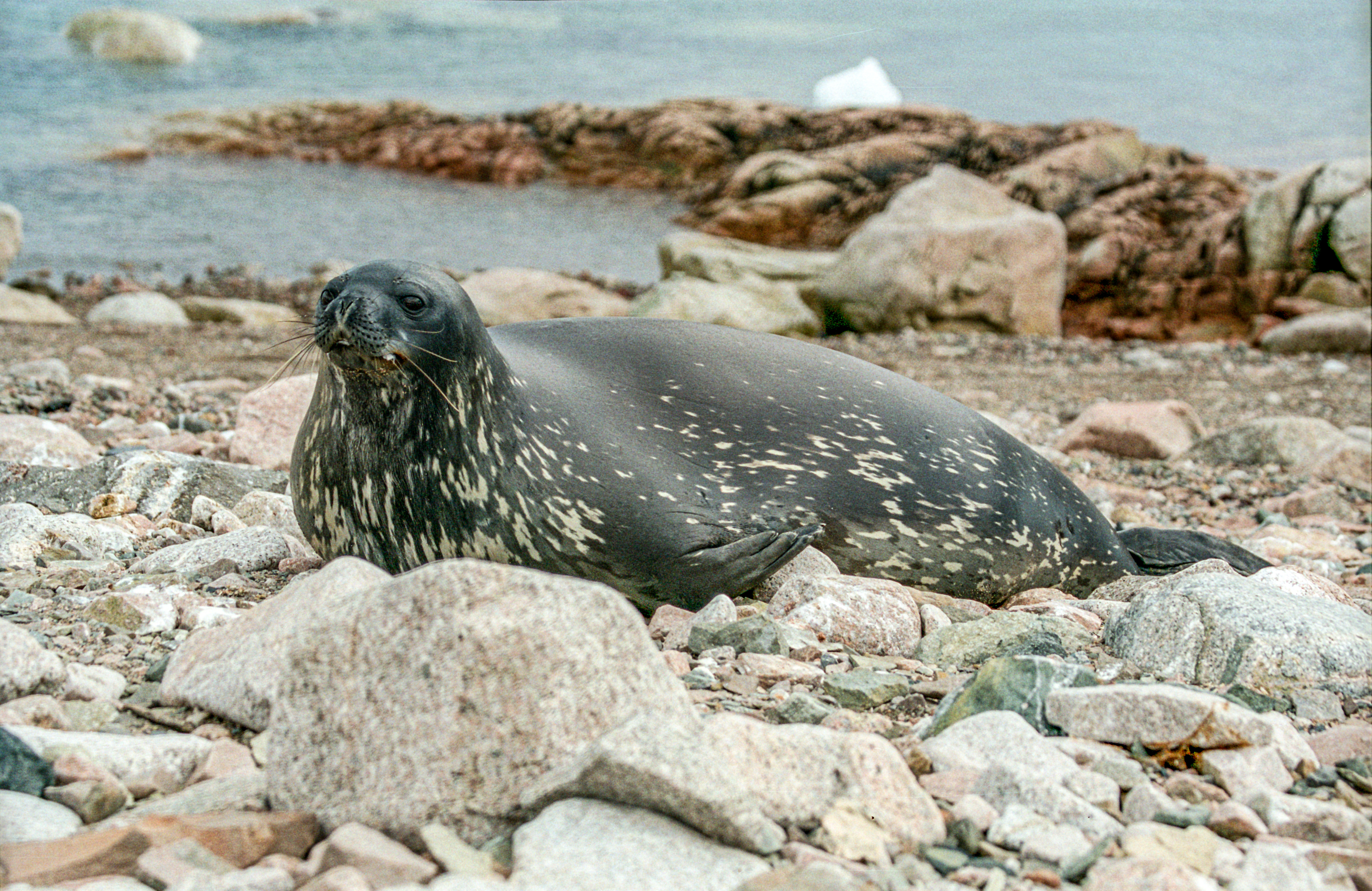
At Neko Harbour, Antarctica

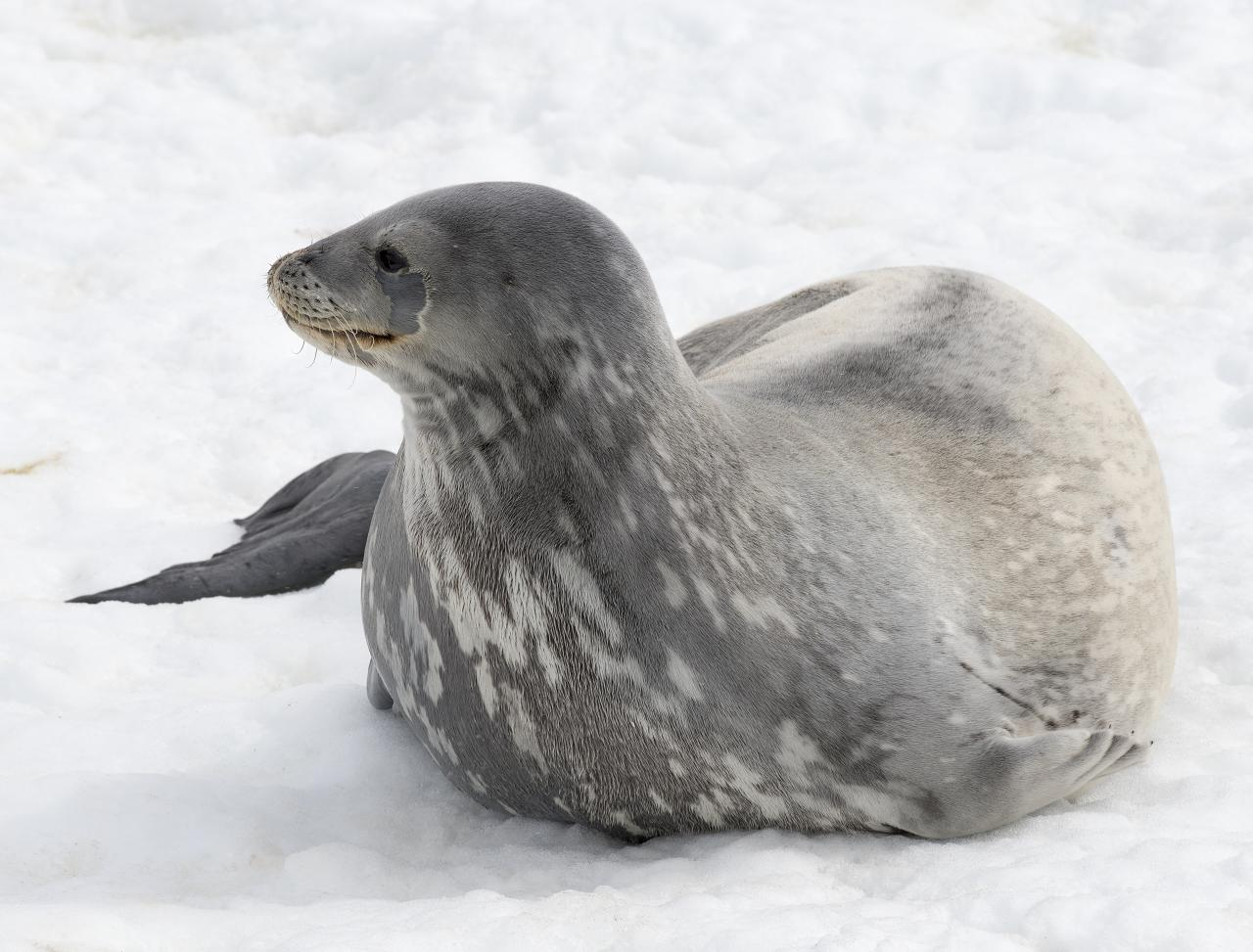
At The Snow in Antarctica

Weddell seals are the second most abundant species of Antarctic phocid, after the crabeater seal.

The most recent estimate suggests a population of about 202,000 female seals, based on high-resolution satellite images from November 2011 that cover the full habitat range of the species. This number includes females only, as males are mostly underwater guarding their territories in November. There are likely to be fewer males than females, as the ratio skews towards females with increasing age.

Previous estimates, with lower geographic coverage and thus relying more heavily on extrapolations, tended to be much higher, reporting numbers in the range of 800,000 or so.

Because of the widespread distribution of Weddell seals, population assessments are difficult and expensive to conduct, and therefore infrequently undertaken. However, thanks to the availability of higher-resolution satellite imagery and crowdsourced data, future counts may be simplified with automated image recognition.

== Threats ==
During the early periods of Antarctic exploration, Weddell seals suffered dramatic declines as they were hunted for food and oil. Populations have since recovered after the elimination of commercial sealing in the 1980s.

However, the effects of global climate change on Antarctic seals are still to be fully determined. Research estimates seal populations may decline as the availability of their habitat is extremely temperature sensitive thus making them potentially vulnerable. Climate changes affecting the duration and the extent of the sea ice and nutrient availability could potentially reduce pups' survival and may have important implications for population growth rates. The fact that some populations breed on land (e.g., in South Georgia), could demonstrate the ability of the species to colonise different environments, although the extent of such plasticity is uncertain.

In the past, the establishment of Antarctic research bases has caused a measure of disturbance to these seals. In January 1998 the Environmental Protection Protocol to the Antarctic Treaty was ratified, implementing environmental measures such as the banning of mining and oil drilling in Antarctica for at least 50 years, along with the banning of refuse disposal and the use of pesticides in the region. However, the disturbance effects of the increasing seasonal tourism in the Antarctic and Sub-Antarctic on Weddell seal behaviour, distribution, and foraging are still unknown.

Currently, there are no reports of significant fisheries interactions. Although, the development of new fisheries in Antarctic waters, particularly one targeting the Antarctic toothfish, could have an impact on Weddell seal nutrition, and potential operational interactions should be considered in the management plans.

== Conservation status ==
The Weddell seal is protected by the Antarctic Treaty and the Convention for the Conservation of Antarctic Seals (CCAS). It is classified as being of "least concern" by the IUCN. This species is not listed by CITES.

== See also ==
- Warren Zapol
