= Wedel (disambiguation) =

Wedel is a town in the district of Pinneberg, in Schleswig-Holstein, Germany.

Wedel may also refer to:

- E. Wedel, a Polish confectionery company
- Wedel or Vedel an older spelling of the city Vejle
- Wedel (surname), a surname
- Wedel station, a railway station on the Altona-Blankenese line
- Wedel (family)

== See also ==
- Weddell (disambiguation)
- Wedel-Jarlsberg
