= Swallow (1820 ship) =

History

United Kingdom
- Name: Swallow
- Namesake: Swallow
- Launched: 1818, or 1820, Shelburne, Nova Scotia
- Fate: Wrecked 11 July 1829

General characteristics
- Tons burthen: 64, or 65, or 164 (bm)
- Sail plan: Schooner

Swallow was launched in Shelburne, Nova Scotia, possibly in 1820, and was registered at Saint John, New Brunswick, in 1825, and then in Plymouth, Great Britain. She was wrecked in the Azores in 1829.

In 1825 Swallow sailed to Great Britain and assumed British Registry. She first appeared in Lloyd's Register (LR) in 1826 with L.John, master, Broderick, owner, and trade Cork–Gibraltar.

The Register of Shipping (RS) for 1829 showed Swallow with Johns, master, Broderick, owner, and trade London–Fayal.

Swallow was wrecked off Pico on 11 July 1829 with the loss of a crew member, her mate. She was on a voyage from Fayal to Plymouth, Devon.

At the time one of her passengers was James Weddell, whose ship Jane had become leaky on a voyage from Buenos Aires to Gibraltar and been condemned at Fayal. Her cargo had been transferred to Swallow and was completely lost.
