= French Harbour =

Bay in the Falkland Islands

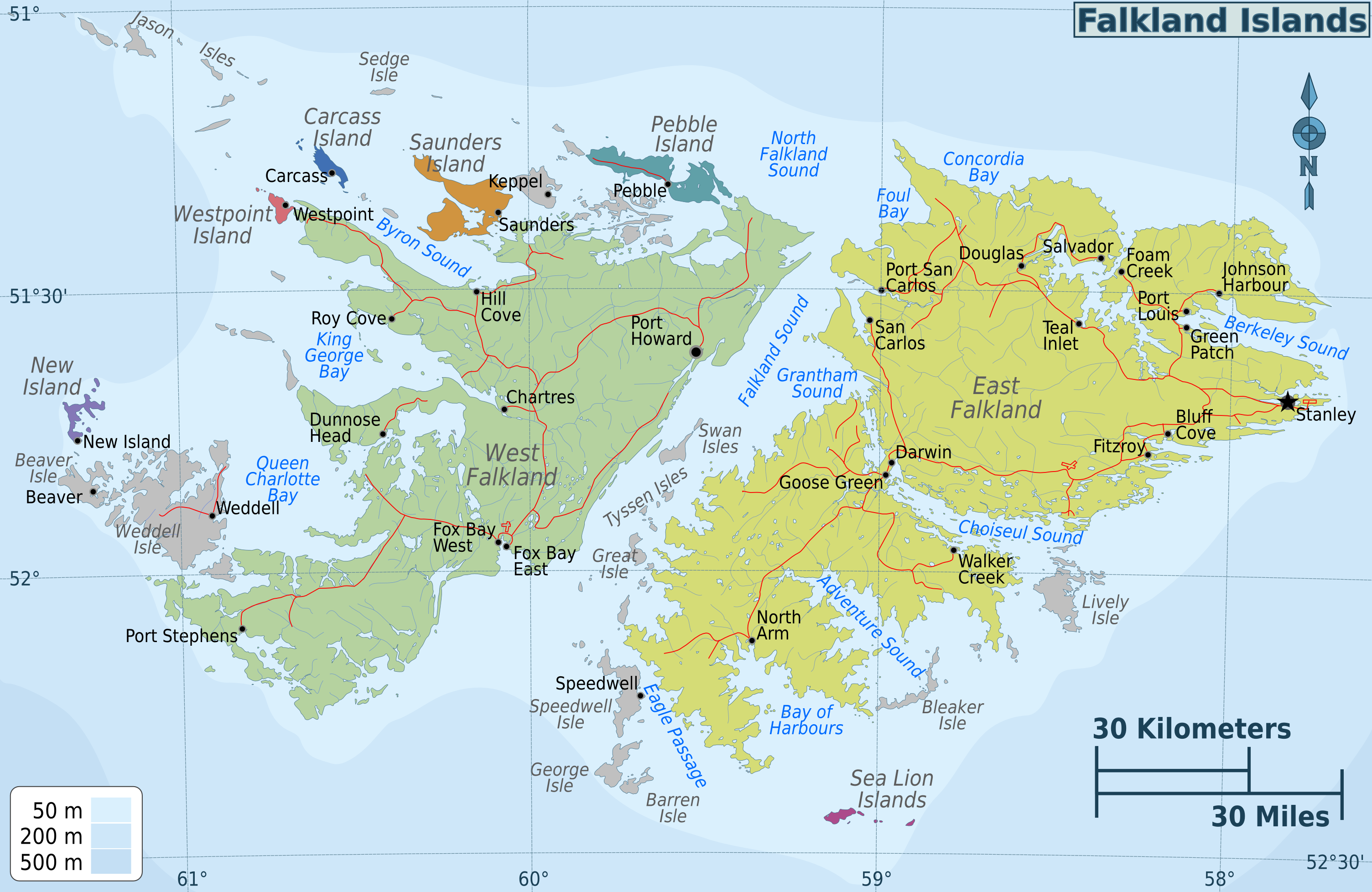
Location of Weddell Island in the Falkland Islands

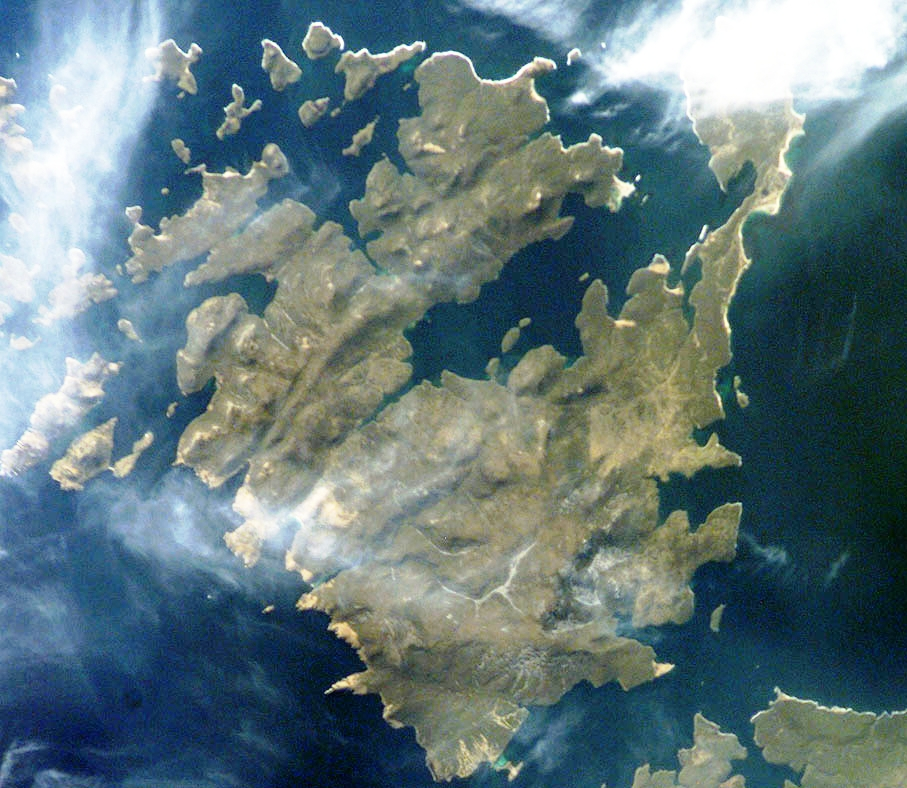
Satellite image of Weddell Island

French Harbour is the 500 m wide bay indenting for 3.1 km the west coast of Weddell Island in the Falkland Islands. It is entered 5.5 km north of Weddell Point, and centred at 51°51′03″S 61°06′50″W.

== Maps ==
- The Falkland Islands. Scale 1:401280 map. London: Edward Stanford, 1901
- Falkland Islands Explorer Map. Scale 1:365000. Ocean Explorer Maps, 2007
- Falklands Topographic Map Series. Scale 1:50000, 29 sheets. DOS 453, 1961-1979
- Falkland Islands. Scale 1:643000 Map. DOS 906. Edition 3-OS, 1998
- Map 500k--xm20-4. 1:500000 map of Weddell Island and part of West Falkland. Russian Army Maps (for the world)
- Approaches to the Falkland Islands. Scale 1:1500000 chart. Gps Nautical Charts, 2010
- Illustrated Map of Weddell Island

== Gallery ==
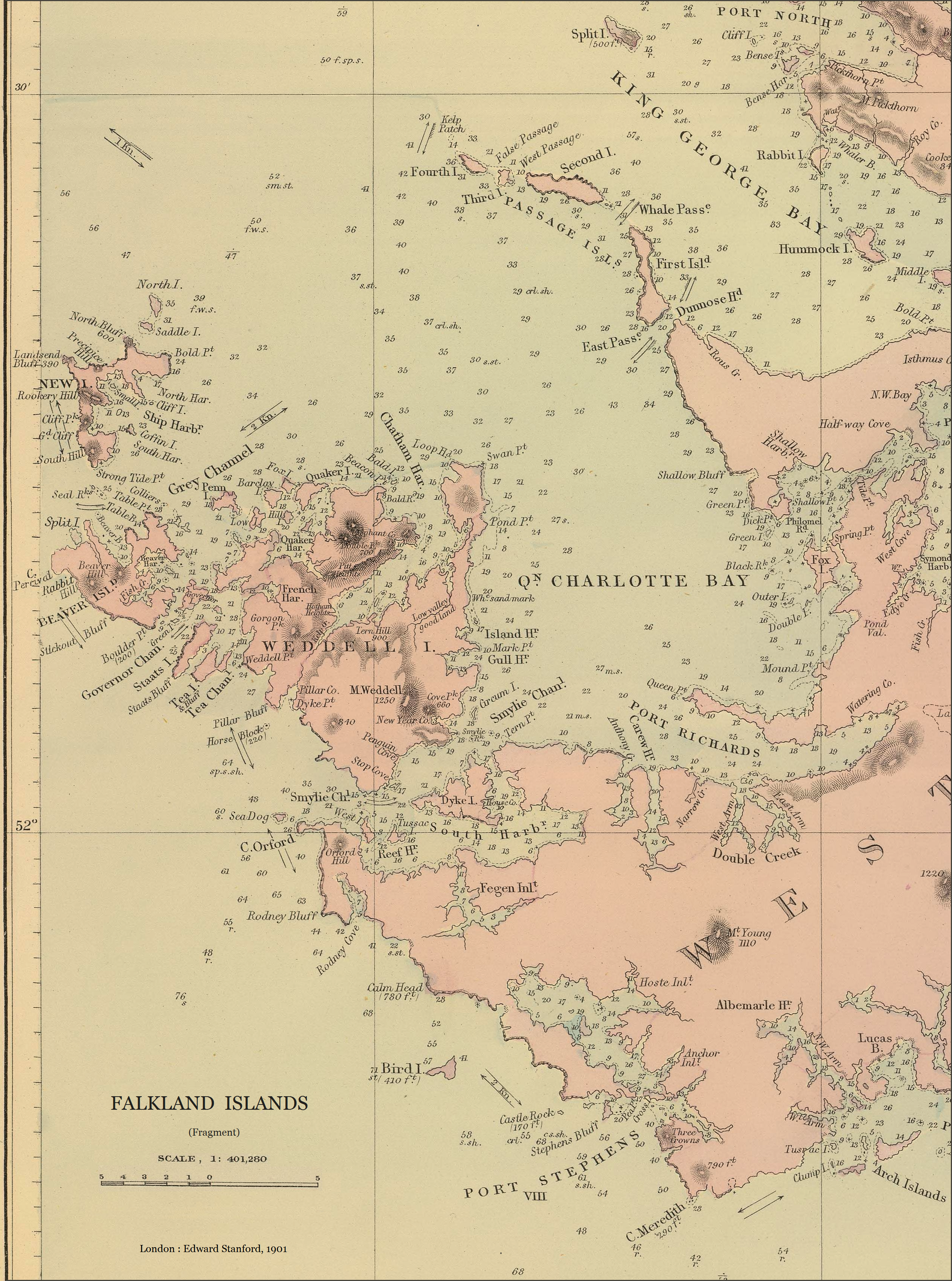
Old map of Weddell Island featuring French Harbour

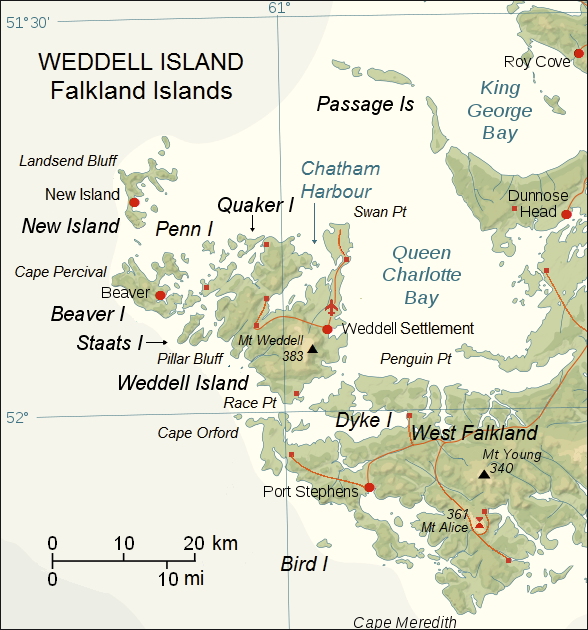
Map of Weddell Island
