= Horse Block =

- Island
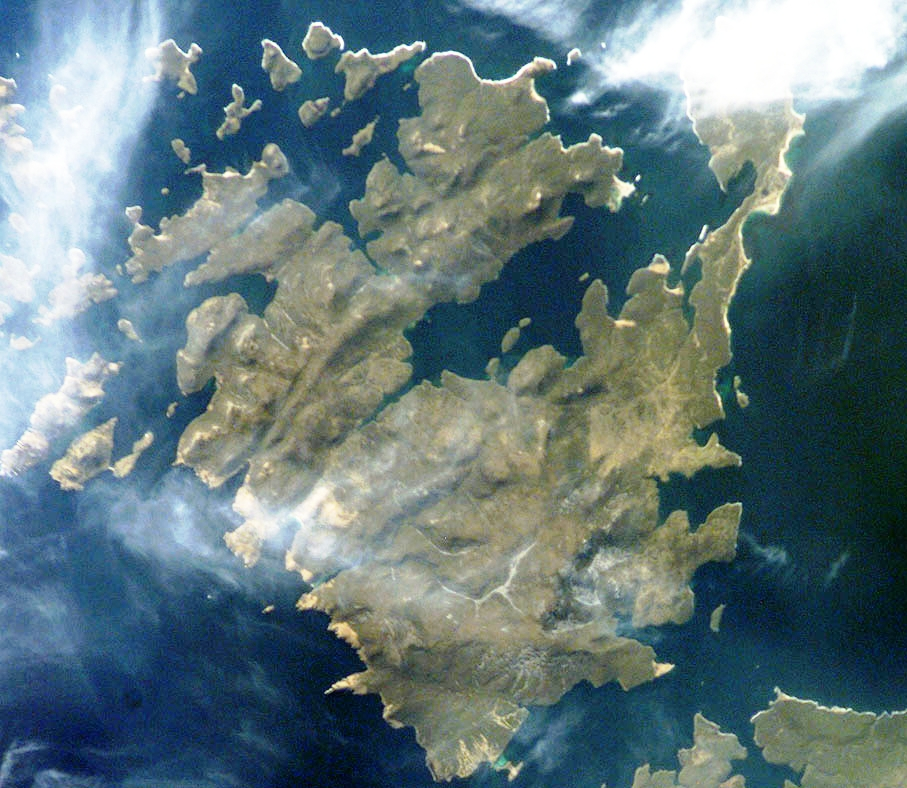
- Satellite image of Weddell Island

- Horse Block shown within the Falkland Islands
- Coordinates: 51.940944°S 61.114444°W
- Country: Falkland Islands
- Time zone: UTC−3 (FKST)
- If shown, area and population ranks are for all islands and all inhabited islands in the Falklands respectively.

The Horse Block is a sea stack of the Falkland Islands. It is situated off the southwest coast of Weddell Island, 1.8 km southwest of Pillar Bluff.

== Geology ==
Sea stacks are particularly common along the west of the Falklands due to the tidal swell, and the erosive, battering action of the Falkland Current.

The stack is named for its resemblance to a horse in silhouette.

== Gallery ==
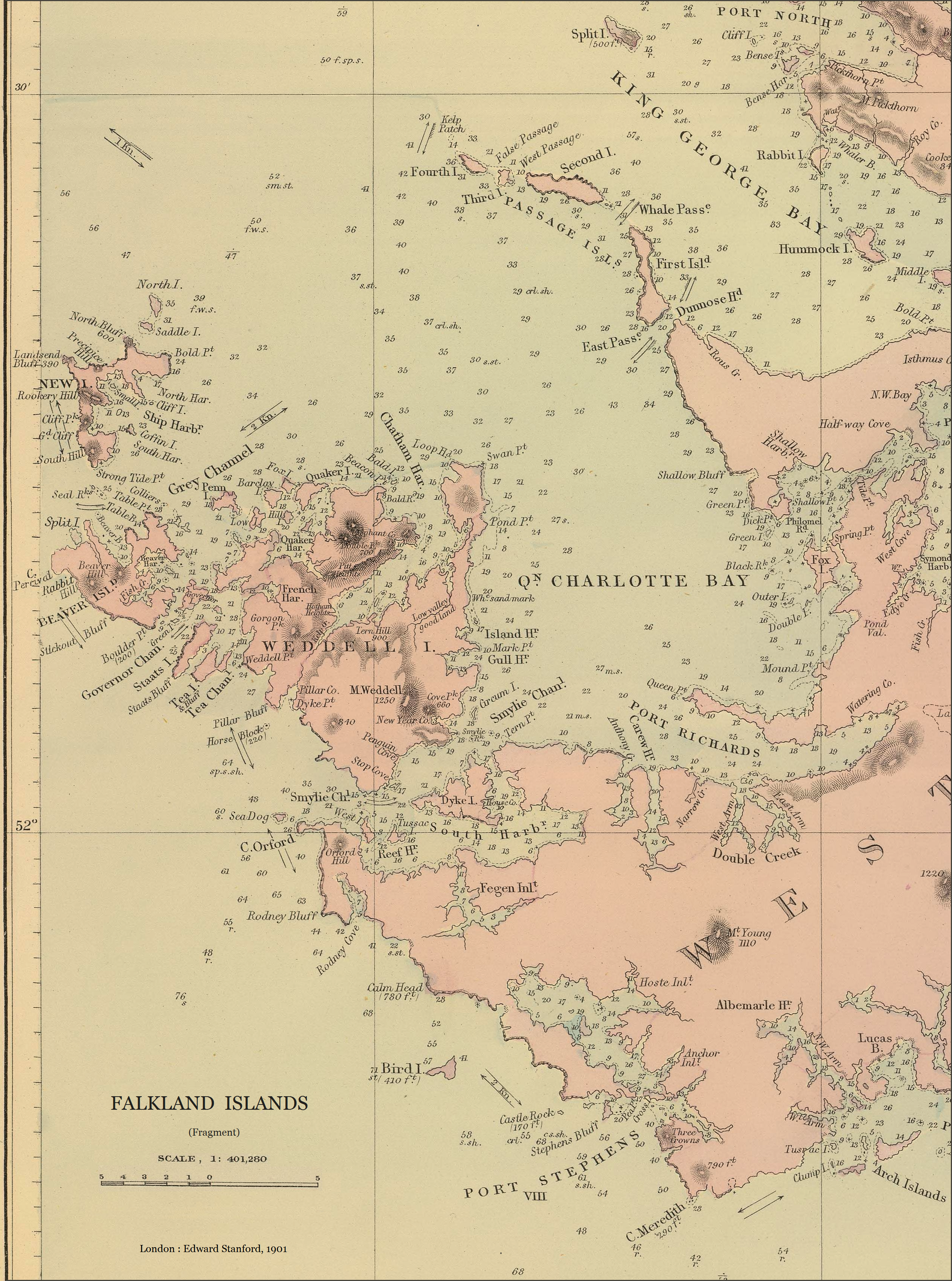
Old map of Weddell Island featuring Horse Block

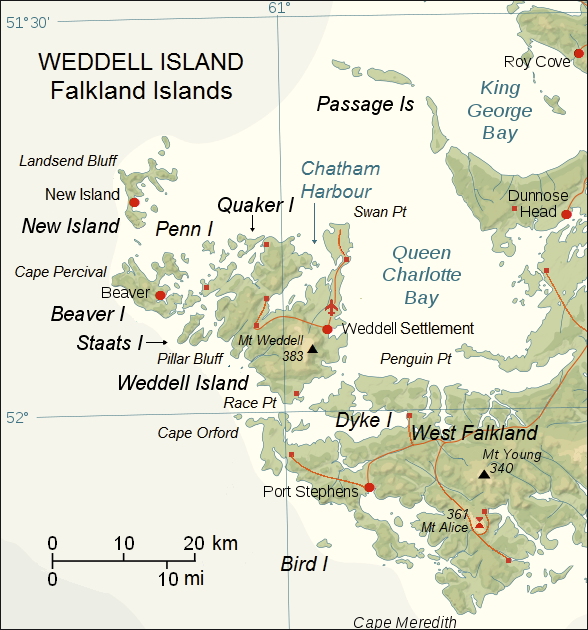
Map of Weddell Island

1901 map of the Falklands
