= Weddle =

Weddle is a surname. Notable people with the surname include:

- Chris Weddle (born 1983), bodhrán player and instructor
- David Weddle, American television producer and writer
- Eric Weddle (born 1985), American football player
- Jack Weddle (1905–1979), English footballer
- James D. Weddle, American businessman
- Mary Weddle (1934–2021), All-American Girls Professional Baseball League player
- Mat Weddle or Obadiah Parker (born 1983), American singer-songwriter
- Thomas Weddle (1817–1853) English mathematician
- Vernon Weddle (born 1935), American film, stage and television actor

== See also ==
- Weddell (disambiguation), which includes a list of people with the surname
