= Jerrold von Wedel =

American heart surgeon

- Born: 1921; New York, New York
- Died: July 18, 1963, age 42; San Juan, Puerto Rico
- Citizenship: United States
- Occupation: cardiovascular surgeon
- Spouse: Barbara Ann Stugard
- Children: Randall von Wedel; Diane von Wedel
- Parent(s): Dr. Hassow von Wedel, Jeanetter Klaverwyden

Academic background
- Education: Dartmouth College, Columbia University College of Physicians and Surgeons

Jerrold von Wedel (1921 - July 18, 1963) was an American heart surgeon who studied methods of using a skin flap graft to revascularize a diseased heart, as well as multiple sclerosis, which ultimately killed him. Served in the United States Navy as lieutenant in Japan 1945-1947. He was a faculty member at the University of Puerto Rico School of Medicine.

He died in 1963, at the age of 42 at the San Juan Veterans Administration Medical Center and was buried at Sleepy Hollow Cemetery in North Tarrytown, Mount Pleasant, Westchester, New York, United States., his widow established a cardiovascular research fund at the University of Puerto Rico.
