= Weddell Islands =

Islands of Antarctica

Coordinates: 60°37′51″S 44°49′23″W

Location of the Weddell Islands in the South Orkney Islands.

Location in Antarctica

The Weddell Islands are a group of small islands and rocks lying 1.9 km (1.2 mi) south of Saddle Island and 9 km (5.6 mi) north of the western end of Laurie Island, in the South Orkney Islands of Antarctica. They were probably first seen during a joint cruise by Captains Nathaniel B. Palmer and George Powell in December 1821. The name first appears on James Weddell's chart resulting from his exploration of the South Orkney Islands in 1823.

== Important Bird Area ==
A 30 ha site, comprising the largest island and some smaller islands immediately to the west, with the intervening marine area, has been designated an Important Bird Area (IBA) by BirdLife International because it supports breeding colonies totalling some 28,000 pairs of Pygoscelis penguins, estimated from 2011 satellite imagery, breeding along the lower slopes of the coastline. Other birds confirmed as breeding in the area include Cape and snow petrels.

== See also ==
- List of Antarctic and Subantarctic islands
