= Eliza (1824 ship) =

Merchant ship

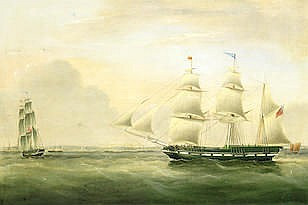
- The Barque Eliza off Margate; circle of Joseph Heard

History

United Kingdom
- Name: Eliza
- Builder: Prince Edward Island
- Launched: 1824
- Fate: Last listed 1843

General characteristics
- Type: Barque
- Tons burthen: 343, or 344, or 348 (bm)
- Propulsion: Sail

Eliza was a merchant ship built at Prince Edward Island, Canada in 1824. She made one voyage transporting convicts from Hobart Town to Sydney, and two to the Swan River Colony. She was last listed in 1843.

== Career ==
Eliza entered Lloyd's Register (LR) for 1826 with J. Fuze, master, T. Sturge, owner, and trade Cork.

The Register of Shipping (RS) for 1828 showed Eliza with S. Furse, master, Sturge, owner, and trade London–New South Wales.

Under the command of J. Fuze, from Portsmouth, England Eliza stopped at Hobart Town and picked up a number of prisoners for transportation. She arrived in Sydney on 16 May 1828. Eliza departed Port Jackson on 21 June 1828 bound for Batavia.

Eliza made two voyages to the Swan River Colony in Western Australia, probably both under the command of Captain James Weddell. She arrived at Freemantle on 8 May 1830. From there she proceeded to Tasmania. In September 1830 Eliza, Weddell, master, left England and arrived at Freemantle on 3 March 1831 with 43 passengers. Lloyd's List reported on 22 November 1831 that Eliza had grounded at Swan River but had been gotten off and was proceeding to Freemantle. Weddell sailed back to England in 1832.

Year	Master	Owner	Trade	Source & notes
1830	J.Fuse; Weddell	T.Surge; Asquith	Liverpool–Alexandria	LR
1835	W.J.Fox	Barnikel	Liverpool–Quebec	LR
1840	N.Purdie	Barnikel	Cork–Sierra Leone	LR; small repairs 1837 & 1838; "Not Op."
1843	N.Purdie	Barnikell	London–Africa	LR; small repairs 1837 & 1838; "Not Op."
