= Chris Weddle =

American drummer

Christopher James Weddle (born 1983) is a bodhrán player and instructor. He has taught workshops nationwide including Mountain View Arkansas, the Dublin Irish Festival, SE Missouri State University, Westminster College and in his home town of St. Louis Missouri.

Chris Weddle has represented the United States in the Fleadh Cheoil na hÉireann eight times, winning Silver and Bronze Medals in the All Ireland in the solo competitions as well as a gold medal in the Grapaí Cheoil. He has performed in Canada, Ireland, throughout the United States, he has opened for various artists such as the Chieftains, and has played before the U.S. Congress. He has recorded several albums consisting of traditional Irish music as well as rock and bluegrass. In recognition of his accomplishments, he has received the highest Congressional award given to civilians - the Congressional Award gold medal which was presented to him in June 2002 in Washington, D.C. He graduated from Webster University in 2006 with a degree in Film Production and is son of Jim Weddle, managing partner for Edward Jones Investments.
