= Paul Phillips (bodhran) =

Irish musician and bodhran maker

Paul Phillips

Paul Phillips (1959–2007) was one of Ireland's most popular and respected bodhrán players and teachers, immersed in the drum as an art form and in particular in the development and promotion of the style of play known as top-end. He shared stages at various times with Mary Bergin, Lunasa, Michael McGoldrick, Sean Ryan, Gerry O'Connor, Steve Cooney, Seamus Tansey and more. He was a regular member of Darragh Folk and Reely Jiggin. Phillips taught and toured widely across Europe, the United States and even as far afield as Timbuktu in the Sahara in 2006, bringing the drum to ever wider audiences. He was an experienced teacher and Comhaltas adjudicator and taught at many of the main summer schools in Ireland.

Phillips died suddenly on 16 September 2007. He had been playing music in the company of friends and was returning home to his wife Oonagh when he had a heart attack.

== Style and teaching ==
Phillips was a proponent of the top-end style of bodhran playing and recognised in his field as an innovator. As a teacher he had a focus on the young players and along with others such as Junior Davey and John Joe Kelly is credited with having been responsible for a new breed of contemporary bodhran playing.

== Bodhran Championships ==
- Ulster bodhrán Champion 1996 to 2003
- All Ireland bodhrán champion, 2003
- World bodhrán champion, 2005/06
- Comhaltas bodhrán and drumming adjudicator
