= D'Hainaut Island =

Island in Palmer Archipelago, Antarctica

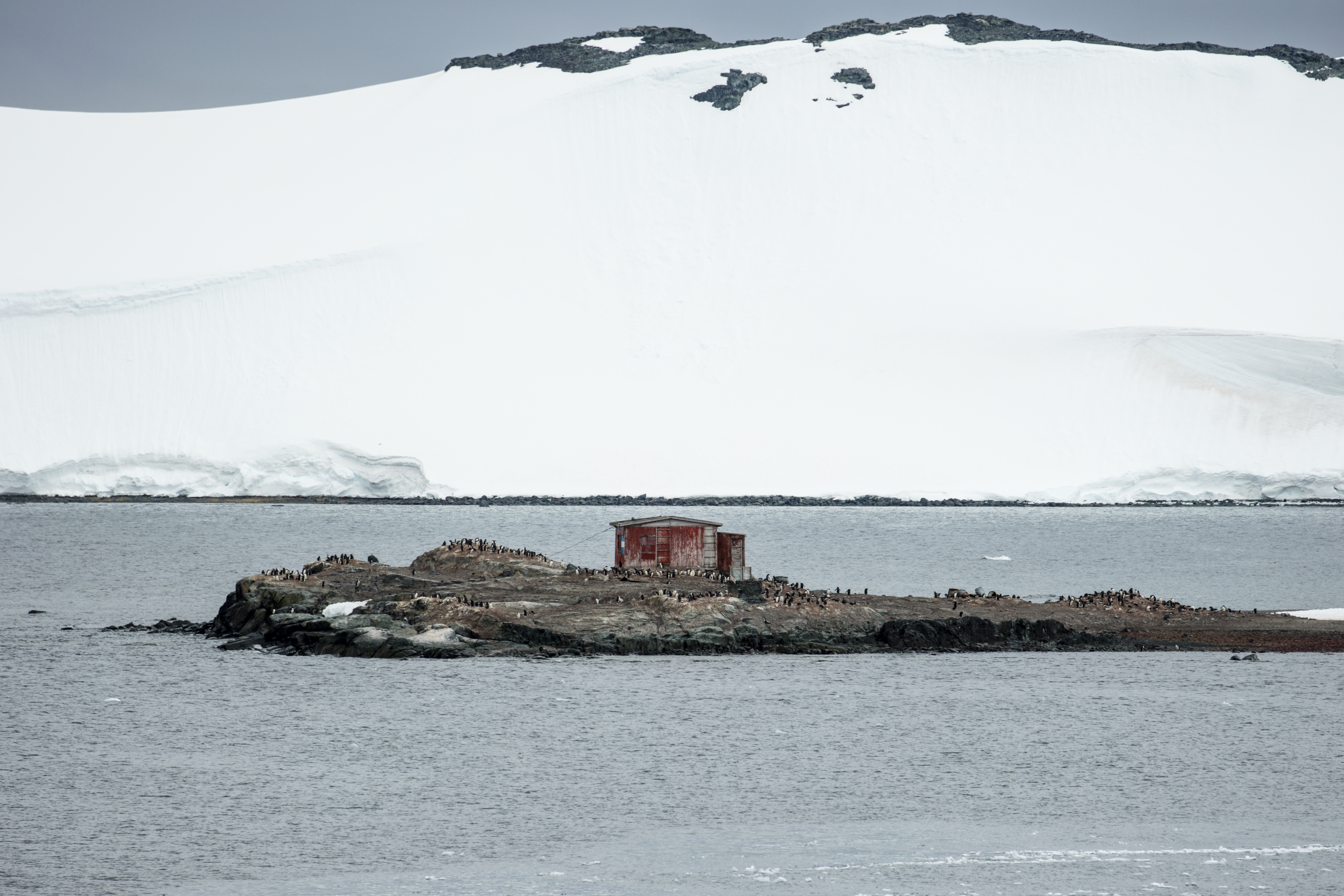
- Refuge Caillet-Bois on the islet

- Location within Antarctic Peninsula

Geography
- Location: Mikkelsen Harbor, Antarctica
- Coordinates: 63°54′09″S 60°47′29″W
- Archipelago: Palmer Archipelago

Administration
- Administered under the Antarctic Treaty System

Demographics
- Population: Uninhabited

D'Hainaut Island is a small island lying in Mikkelsen Harbor, Trinity Island, in the Palmer Archipelago. It was charted by the French Antarctic Expedition, 1908–1910, under Jean-Baptiste Charcot, and named by the sixth Chilean Antarctic Expedition (1952) for Lieutenant Ladislao D'Hainaut.

== Caillet-Bois Refuge ==
Refuge Caillet-Bois is an Argentine refuge in Antarctica located on the D'Hainaut Island. The refuge was inaugurated by the Argentine Navy on 10 December 1954. Originally it took the name of refuge Port Mikkelsen referred to the name of the Danish arctic explorer Ejnar Mikkelsen. The refuge with its current name, which pays tribute to the Argentine naval Captain and historian Teodoro Caillet Bois, was given in December 1977 by the icebreaker ARA General San Martin (Q-4). Then it was closed and evacuated on 17 January of the following year by the icebreaker personnel.

The ARA Petty Officer Castillo visited the shelter in early 2000 during the Antarctic campaign of 1999–2000 and the ARA Almirante Irizar inspected the refuge in April of the same year. The refuge was renovated in March 2017 by the personnel of the transport ARA Bahía San Blas.

== See also ==
- List of Antarctic and sub-Antarctic islands
- List of Antarctic field camps
