= Mikkelsen Harbour =

Bay in Antarctica

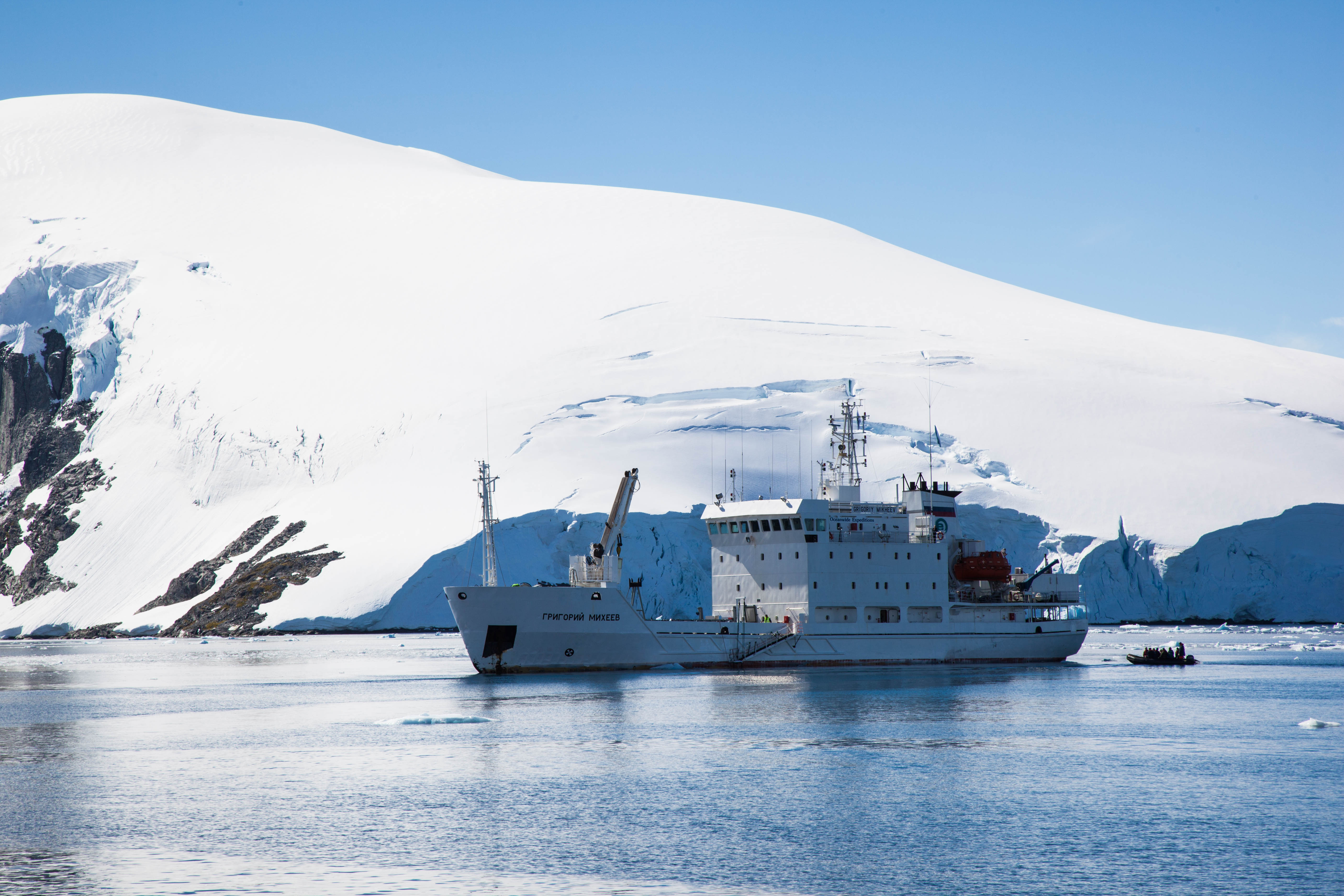
A Russian ship in Mikkelsen Harbour

Mikkelsen Harbour (63°54′S 60°47′W) is a small bay indenting the south side of Trinity Island between Skottsberg Point and Borge Point, in the Palmer Archipelago, Antarctica. It provides excellent anchorage for ships, and was frequently used by sealing vessels in the first half of the nineteenth century and by Norwegian whaling vessels at the beginning of the twentieth century.

== History ==
Mikkelsen Harbour was discovered by the Swedish Antarctic Expedition (SAE) of 1901–1904. The origin of the name comes from Peder Michelsen, a whaling manager who was lost in the whaling grounds in December 1910. The harbour was charted by Captain Hans Borge. Apparently the name was in common usage by 1913, at the time of the geologic reconnaissance by Scottish geologist David Ferguson in the whale-catcher Hanka.

== Named features ==
Mikkelsen Harbour is bordered to the west by Skottsberg Point, the southernmost point of Trinity Island. It was first charted by the SAE, it was named for Carl Skottsberg, botanist of the expedition. Borge Point is a headland forming the east side of Mikkelsen Harbour. Klo Rock is a rock on which the sea breaks, lying at the east side of the entrance to the harbor. Both features were charted and named by Captain Borge.

A small island called D'Hainaut Island sits within the harbour.
