= Wedel (surname) =

Wedel or Wedell is a surname. Notable people with the surname include:

- Wedel family
- Dieter Wedel (1939–2022), German director
- Erich Rüdiger von Wedel (1892-1954), German flying ace
- Georg Wolfgang Wedel (1645–1721), German professor of botany, chemistry and medicine
- George Wedel (1900–1981), English cricketer
- Hasso von Wedel (aviator) (1893-1945), German flying ace
- Hasso von Wedel (general) (1898-1961), German general during World War II
- Hedda von Wedel (born 1942), German jurist and politician
- Janine R. Wedel, American anthropologist
- Jerrold von Wedel (1921–1963), American heart surgeon
- Johann Adolph Wedel (1675–1747), German professor of medicine
- Karol Wedel (1813–1902), German Polish confectioner
- Matt Wedel, American paleontologist
- Michel Wedel, American professor of consumer science
- Mildred Mott Wedel (1912–1995), American scholar of Great Plains archaeology and ethnohistory
- Rainbow Wedell (born 2001), Australian actress
- Waldo Rudolph Wedel (1908–1996), American archaeologist
