= James Weddell =

British sailor and polar explorer (1787–1834)

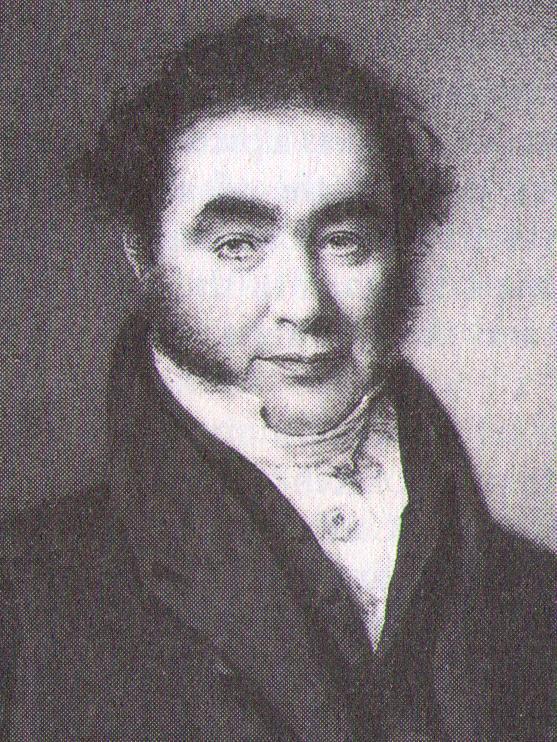
Weddell in 1828

James Weddell FRSE (24 August 1787 – 9 September 1834) was a British sailor, navigator and seal hunter who in February 1823 sailed to latitude of 74° 15′ S, a record 7.69 degrees or 532 statute miles south of the Antarctic Circle, and into a region of the Southern Ocean that later became known as the Weddell Sea.

== Early life ==
He was born in Ostend on the Belgian coast, son of a Scottish sea captain (captains were permitted their wives at sea). He was apprenticed as a seaman (this normally started at the age of eight) and so received little education, but could in the least read and write. He originally worked on merchant ships on the north-east Scottish coast.

He entered the merchant service very early in his life and was apparently bound to the master of a Newcastle collier (a coal transport vessel) for some years. About 1805 he shipped on board a merchantman trading to the West Indies, making several voyages there.

In 1808 he struck his captain, which was considered a severe crime, and was handed to the Royal Navy for punishment. This proved a positive rather than negative step. He studied navigation during his imprisonment and on release joined the Royal Navy as a midshipman. He rose rapidly through the ranks, becoming captain.

He was aboard HMS Hope in 1813 in the English Channel when she captured the "Young True Blooded Yankee", a small American privateer. With the end of the Napoleonic War he was laid off on half pay in February 1816, and for a while resumed merchant voyages to the West Indies. In 1819 he was paid off in full from the Royal Navy.

== Voyages to the Antarctic ==
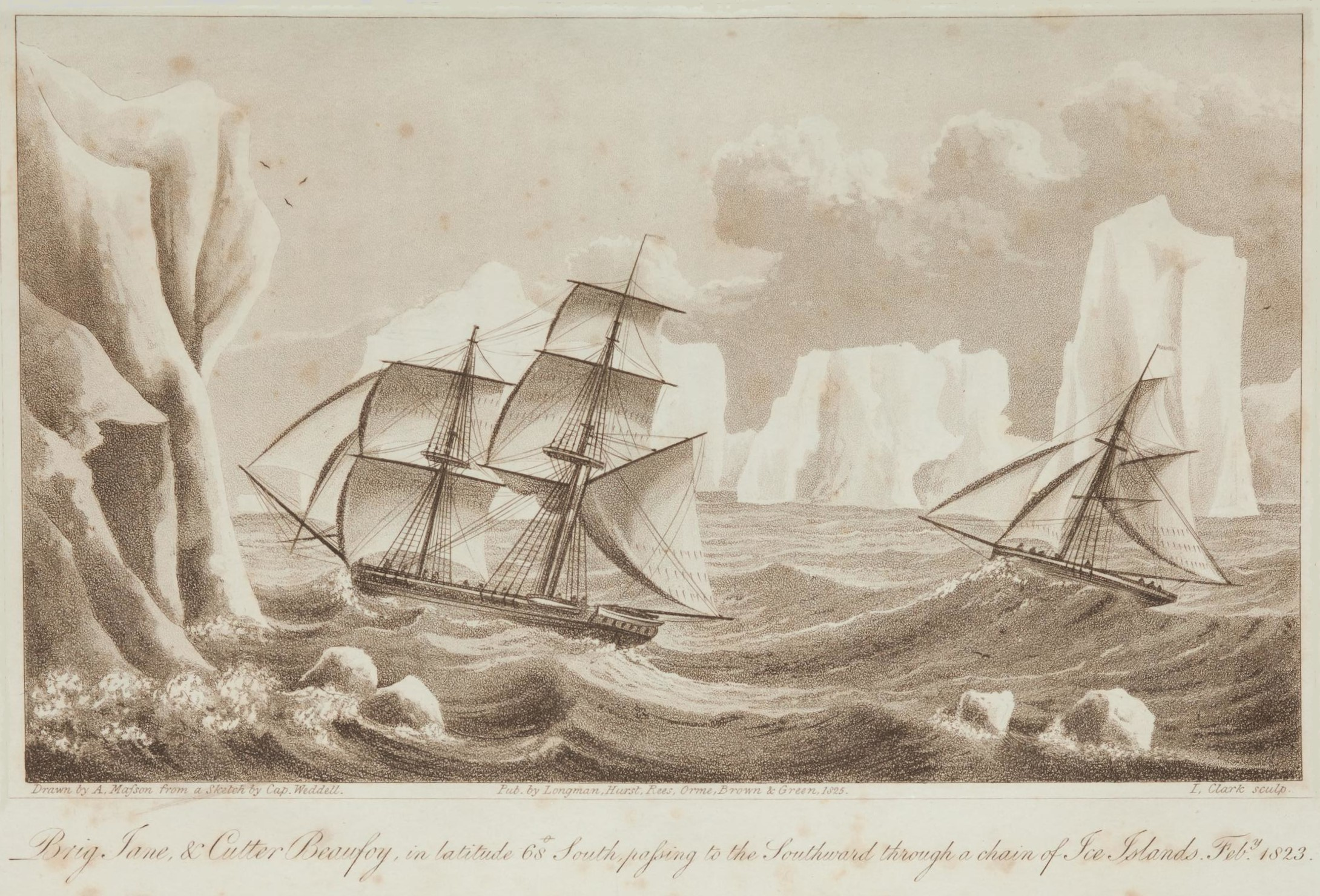
Print of James Weddell's second expedition, showing the brig Jane and cutter Beaufoy

In 1819 Weddell was introduced to James Strachan, a shipbuilder of North Leith, a partner of "Strachan & Gavin" shipbuilders.

Strachan, together with James Mitchell, a Scottish insurance broker living in London, owned the 160-ton brig Jane, an American-built ship taken during the War of 1812 and re-fitted for sealing. News of the discovery of the South Shetland Islands had just broken, and Weddell suggested that fortunes might be made in the new sealing grounds. His first voyage as the captain of the Jane took him to the Falkland Islands and further south. He returned with the holds full, and the voyage was so profitable that Strachan and Mitchell had a second ship, the Beaufoy, built.

The next voyage from 1821 and 1822 took both ships to the South Shetland Islands. However, there were some 45 sealers operating in the area, and seal were already becoming rare (a mere two years after the discovery of the islands), and so he scouted for new hunting grounds.

Michael McCleod, the captain of the Beaufoy, sighted the South Orkney Islands on 22 November 1821, an independent discovery from that of Powell and Palmer just a few days earlier. There, they hunted for seals, and arrived back in England in July.

On the third voyage from 1822 to 1824, Weddell again commanded the Jane, while the captain of the Beaufoy was one Matthew Brisbane. Together they sailed to the South Orkneys again. Sealing proved disappointing, though, and after searching for land between the South Shetlands and the South Orkneys (and not finding any), they turned south in the hope to better sealing ground. The season was unusually mild and tranquil, and on 20 February 1823, the two ships had reached latitude 74°15′S and longitude 34°16′45″W (−74.25, −34.279): the southernmost position any ship had ever reached up to that time. A few icebergs were sighted, but there was still no sight of land, leading Weddell to theorize that the sea continued as far as the South Pole. Another two days' sailing would have brought him to Coats Land (to the east of the Weddell Sea), but Weddell decided to turn back.

After deciding to go back, Weddell cheered the crew with the announcement of being southward of any former navigator and held a little ceremony; the colours were hoisted, a gun was fired, both crews gave three cheers, and an allowance of grog dispelled the gloom. A hope was infused that fortune might yet favor the crew of sealers. The area was named The Sea of George the Fourth, but the naming did not become permanent. The region would not be visited again until 1911, when Wilhelm Filchner discovered the Filchner-Ronne Ice Shelf.

Weddell returned north and sheltered at South Georgia, where he and his crews searched for the elusive seal. They wintered at the Falklands and sailed again for the South Shetlands in November 1823. At the beginning of 1824, the two ships separated. Weddell returned in March 1824 to the Falklands and headed back to England, where he arrived in July.

The Weddell seal was discovered and named in the 1820s during expeditions led by James Weddell.

His record for a southerly voyage, three degrees beyond that of James Cook, caused some raised eyebrows. Weddell was persuaded by Strachan and Mitchell to incorporate everything in a book. The first edition appeared in 1825, followed by second enlarged edition in 1827, incorporating some information from the Beaufoy which had returned to England in 1826.

Weddell appears to have been resident in Edinburgh, Scotland in the summer of 1826, when he was cited for non-payment of a debt of £245 (£21,000 in 2026), loaned to him by the Commercial Bank. As his name appears on no directory in this period he was either living with a friend or relative.

Papers now in the National Archives of Scotland show that he and his sponsors appear to have fallen out over liability for payment, and is probably more than coincidence that the navigational instruments taken by Weddell on board, cost, according to his book, £240. The Leith merchants engaging him may have felt that these were unnecessary for a sealing expedition, yet Weddell has been criticised by such historians as David Walton for failing to take more instruments, not fewer. The legal papers fail to indicate what happened to the debt.

He was certainly in Edinburgh in February 1827 as he was elected an Ordinary Fellow of the Royal Society of Edinburgh, requiring his physical presence (were he not present he would have been elected an Honorary Fellow). His proposer was Admiral Norwich Duff.

== Later life ==
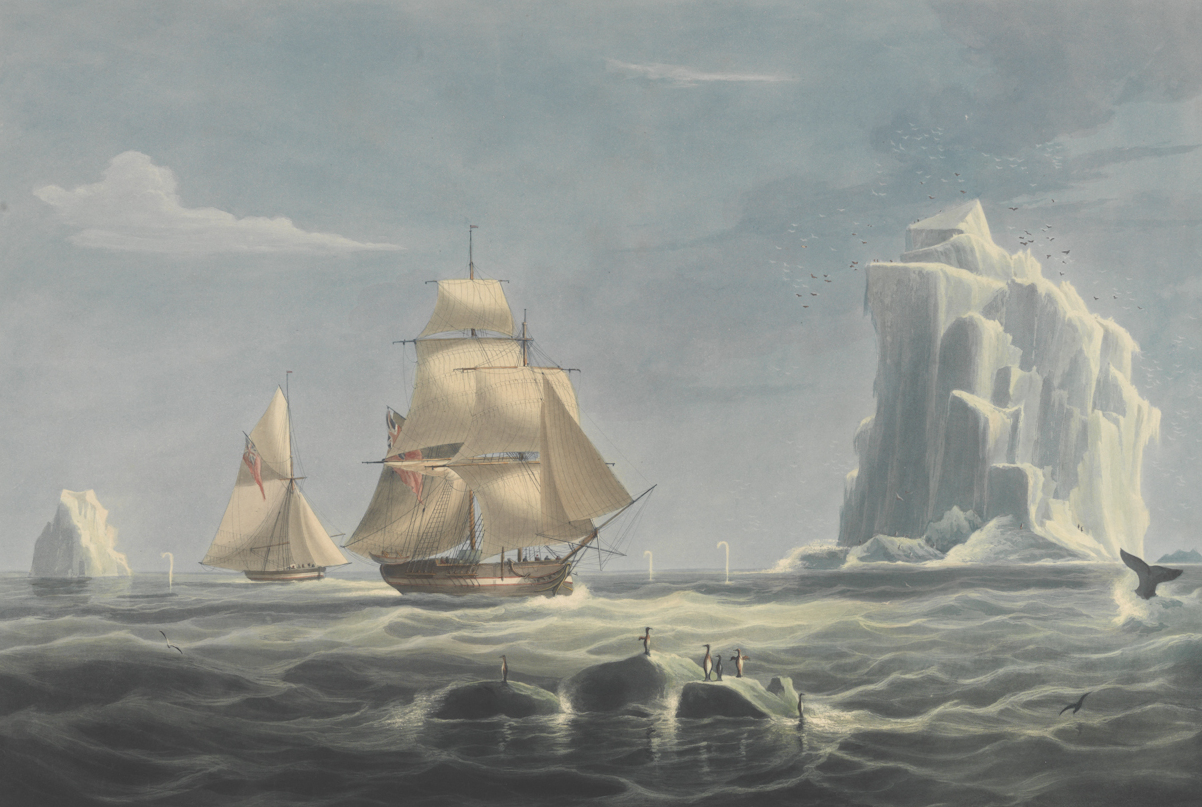
Jane and Beaufoy at their furthest point south in 1823

Weddell offered his services to the Admiralty with a proposal for a return voyage to the high southern latitudes, but was turned down. Instead, he returned to trading along the warmer Atlantic coasts. In 1829 he was again master of the Jane, but on a passage from Buenos Aires to Gibraltar Jane leaked so badly that she had to be given up at the Azores. Weddell and his cargo were transferred to another ship for the passage to England, but this ran aground on the island of Pico, and Weddell only barely survived.

The loss of the Jane meant financial ruin for Weddell, who was forced to take paid employment as a ship's master. In September 1830 he left England as master of Eliza, bound for the Swan River Colony in Western Australia. From there he proceeded to Tasmania. He sailed back to England in 1832.

Weddell died on 9 September 1834 at the age of forty-seven. Although perhaps less affluent and famous than might be expected, he died in his house at Norfolk Street off The Strand in London. He was buried in the churchyard of St Clement Danes, very close to his home.

== Commemorations ==
Three places are named after him – the Weddell Sea, Weddell Islands in the South Orkney Islands, and Weddell Island in the Falklands. Also the Weddell seal is named after him.

== Publications ==
- A Voyage Towards the South Pole (1825)
