= James D. Weddle =

James D. Weddle is a former managing partner of Edward Jones Investments. He joined the firm as an intern while earning his MBA at Washington University in St. Louis when he was hired in 1976 as a part-time intern in the firm's Research department and spent his entire forty-year career with Edward Jones. In 1984, Weddle was named a principal in the firm and moved back to St. Louis, Missouri, where he assumed a series of responsibilities, including one of the firm's largest areas, Mutual Fund Sales and Marketing. In 1989, he became responsible for development of the east coast market. Weddle was named managing partner in November 2005 when he replaced Doug Hill. He retired in 2018, following the company's bylaws which require it in the year a partner turns 65.

He is a graduate of DePauw University, where he was a member of Delta Kappa Epsilon fraternity.
