= Weddell Point, Weddell Island =

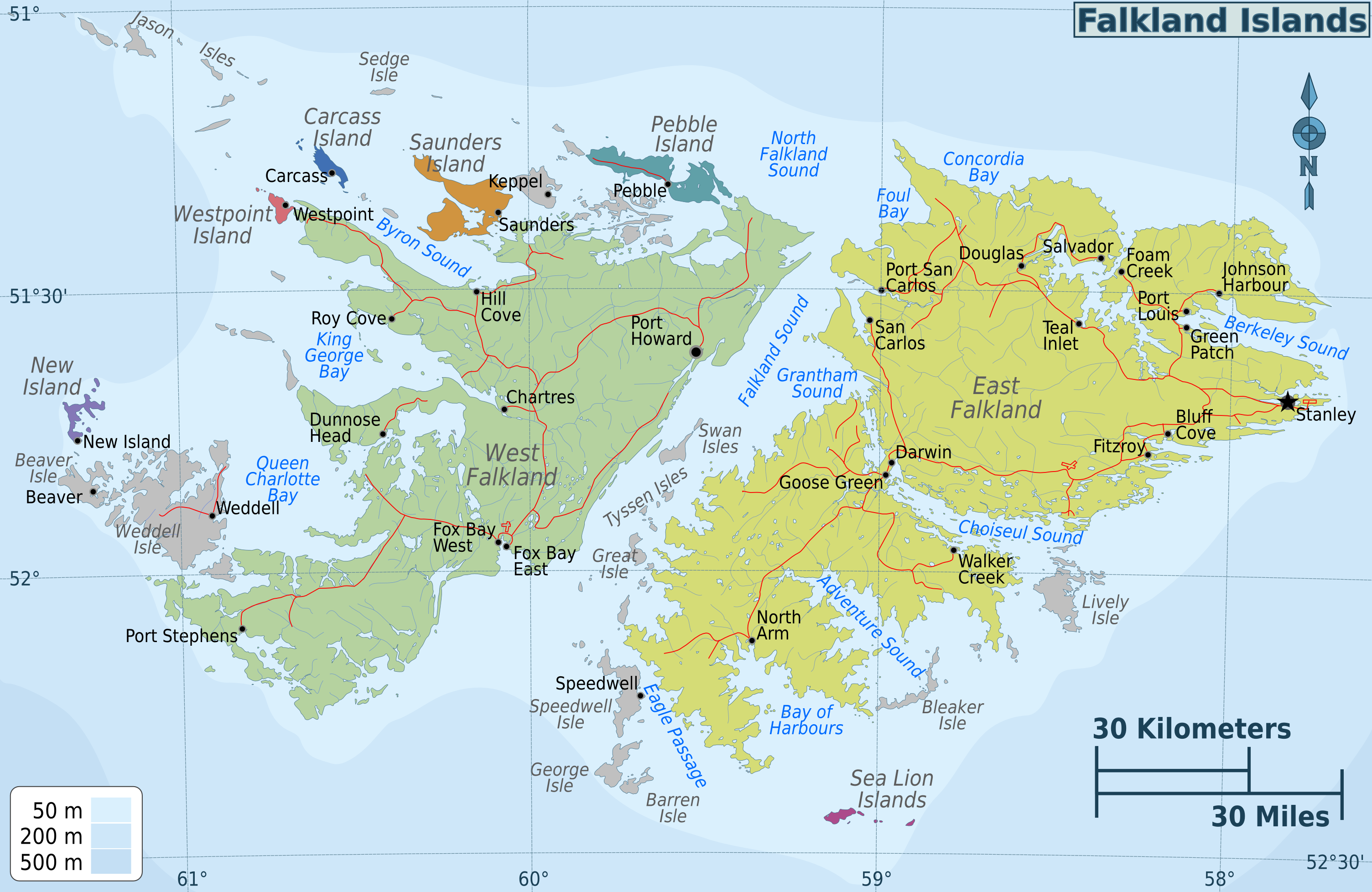
Location of Weddell Island in the Falkland Islands

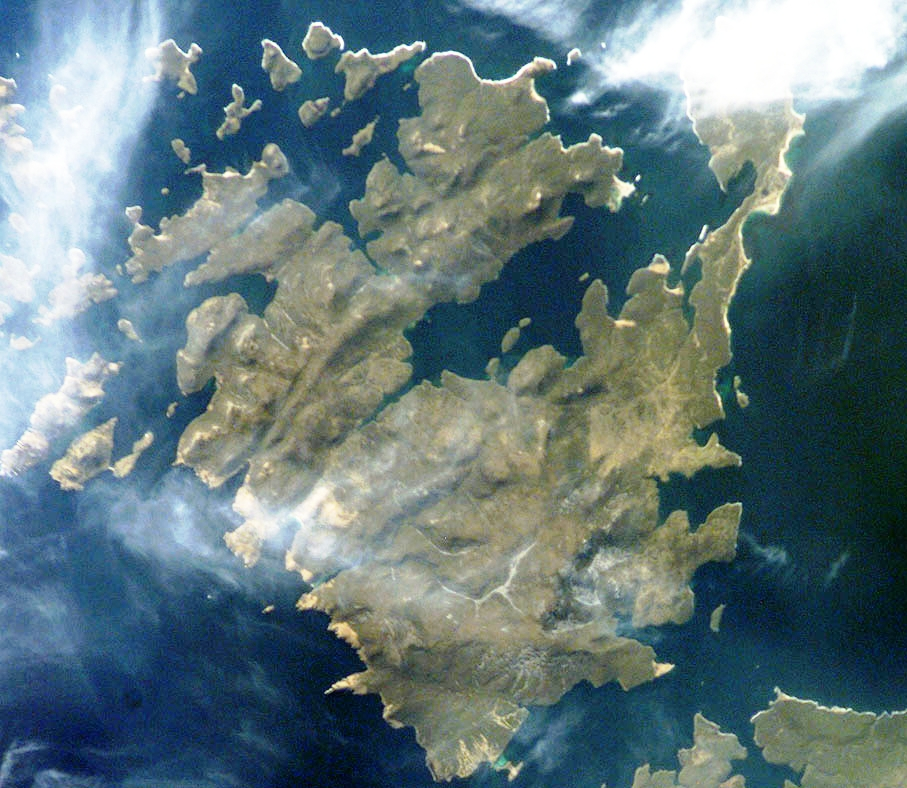
Satellite image of Weddell Island

Weddell Point is the point on the east side of Tea Island Passage forming the south side of the entrance to Skull Bay on the west coast of Weddell Island in the Falkland Islands. The point is located at 51°54′10″S 61°08′03″W, which is 13.2 km northwest of Race Point, 1.1 km southeast of Tea Island and 1.5 km south of Skull Bay Island.

== Maps ==
- The Falkland Islands. Scale 1:401280 map. London: Edward Stanford, 1901
- Falkland Islands Explorer Map. Scale 1:365000. Ocean Explorer Maps, 2007
- Falklands Topographic Map Series. Scale 1:50000, 29 sheets. DOS 453, 1961-1979
- Falkland Islands. Scale 1:643000 Map. DOS 906. Edition 3-OS, 1998
- Map 500k--xm20-4. 1:500000 map of Weddell Island and part of West Falkland. Russian Army Maps (for the world)
- Approaches to the Falkland Islands. Scale 1:1500000 chart. Gps Nautical Charts, 2010
- Illustrated Map of Weddell Island

== Gallery ==
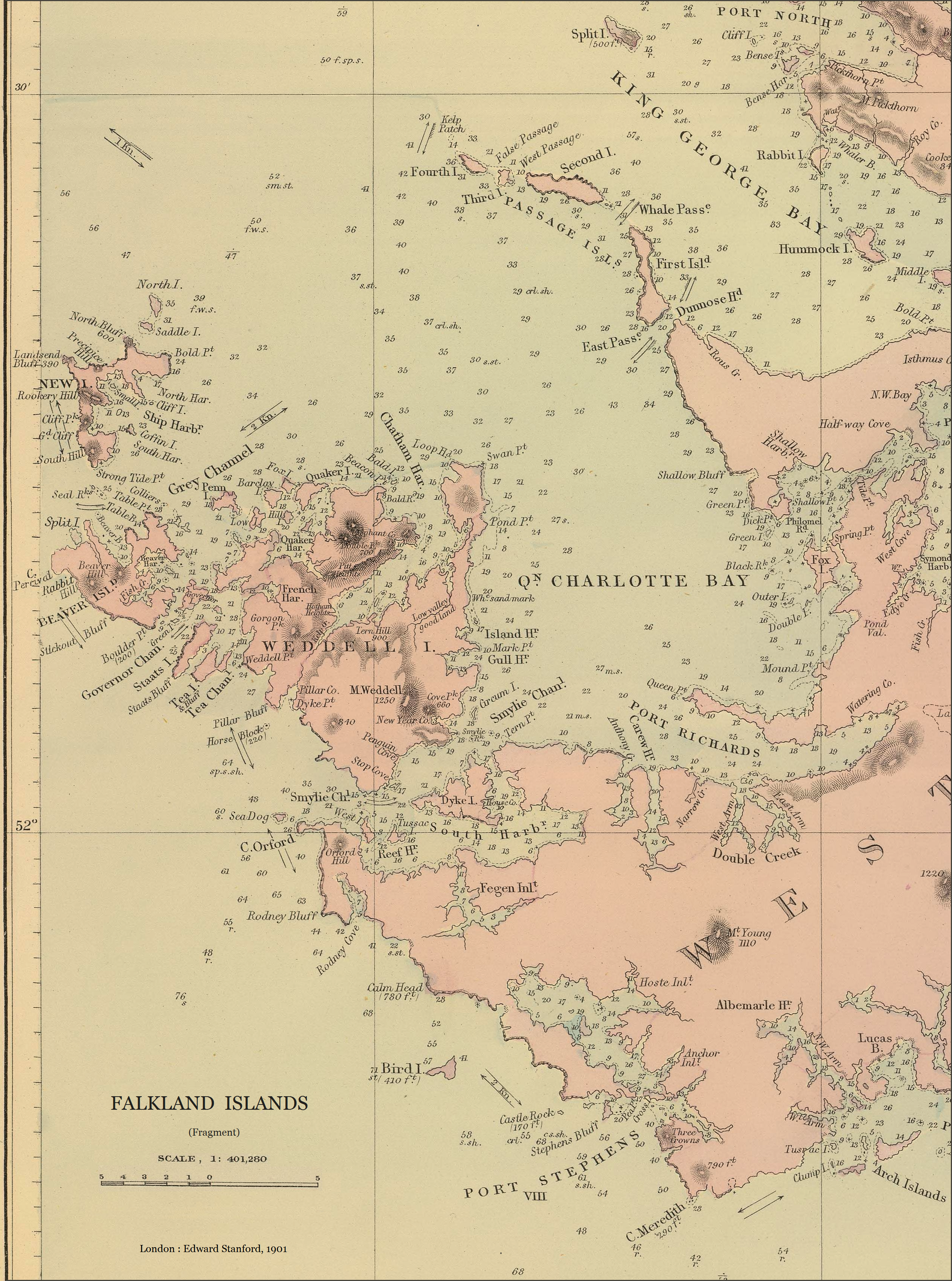
Old map of Weddell Island featuring Weddell Point

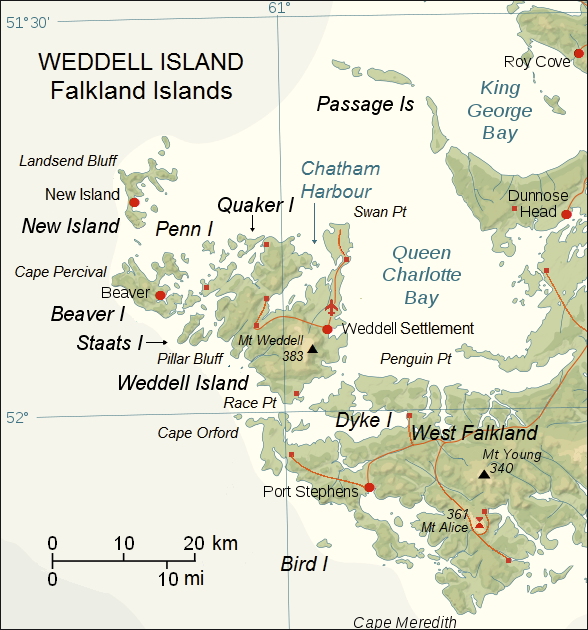
Map of Weddell Island
