= List of large-volume volcanic eruptions in the Basin and Range Province =

Large-volume volcanic eruptions in the Basin and Range Province include Basin and Range eruptions in Utah, California, Idaho, Colorado, New Mexico, Texas, Arizona, Nevada, Wyoming, and Oregon, as well as those of the Long Valley Caldera geological province and the Yellowstone hotspot.

== Volcanic fields ==
The volcanic fields within the Basin and Range Province include Northwestern Nevada, the Modoc Plateau, Central Nevada, the Great Basin, Southwestern Nevada, the Mojave Desert, and the Long Valley Caldera regions. Named fields include Coso Volcanic Field, Mono Lake Volcanic Field, Marysvale Volcanic Field, San Juan volcanic field, Indian Peak, Central Colorado volcanic field, Jemez volcanic lineament, Mogollon-Datil volcanic field, Santa Rosa-Calico, and Boot Heel volcanic field.

== Geological features ==
Many geological features in Western United States have a Northeastern orientation; the North American craton motion has the same orientation as well. For example: the Trans-Challis fault zone in Idaho, the Snake River in Oregon, the Garlock Fault in California, the Colorado River in Utah, the Colorado Mineral Belt, Crater Flat-Reveille Range-Lunar Crater lineament, the Northwestern Nevada volcanic field, the San Juan caldera cluster in Colorado, the Socorro-Magdalena caldera cluster in New Mexico, Jemez Lineament, and the Yellowstone hotspot trail. But the Yellowstone hotspot trail was modified through faults and extension.

== Geology ==
Prior to the Eocene Epoch (55.8 ± 0.2 to 33.9 ± 0.1 Ma), the convergence rate of the Farallon and North American Plates was fast and the angle of subduction was shallow. During the Eocene, the Farallon Plate subduction-associated compressive forces of the Laramide orogeny ended, plate interactions changed from orthogonal compression to oblique strike-slip, and volcanism in the Basin and Range Province flared up. It is suggested that this plate continued to be underthrust until about 19 Ma, at which time it was completely consumed and volcanic activity ceased, in part. Olivine basalt from the oceanic ridge erupted around 17 Ma and extension began. The extension resulted in roughly north-south-trending faults, the Great Basin, the Walker trough, the Owens graben, and the Rio Grande rift, for instance.

== List of large-volume eruptions in the Basin and Range Province ==
The large-volume eruptions in the Basin and Range Province include:

Large-Volume Eruptions in the Basin and Range Province
Name or Source	Counties	States	Age (Ma)	VEI	Volume	Notes	References
Long Valley Caldera	Mono	California	0.7589 ± 0.0018	7	600 km^{3} (140 cu mi)	Created the Bishop tuff	
Valles Caldera	Sandoval	New Mexico	1.15	7	600 km^{3} (140 cu mi)	Created the Tshirege formation of the Bandelier tuff	
Valles Caldera	Sandoval	New Mexico	1.47			Created the Otowi member of the Bandelier tuff	
Lake Owyhee volcanic fields	Malheur	Oregon	15 to 15.5			May have been due to the Yellowstone hotspot	
Northwest Nevada volcanic field	Washoe, Humboldt	Nevada	15.5 to 16.5			May have been due to the Yellowstone hotspot. Calderas include Virgin Valley, High Rock, Hog Ranch, and others. Tuffs include Idaho Canyon, Ashdown, Summit Lake, and Soldier Meadow.	
Columbia River Basalt Province		Idaho, Nevada, Oregon, Washington	14 to 17		240,000 km^{3} (58,000 cu mi)		
Mount Belknap Caldera	Beaver, Piute	Utah	19		150 km^{3} (36 cu mi)	17 km × 12 km (10.6 mi × 7.5 mi); Marysvale Volcanic Field; Joe Lott tuff	
Big John Caldera		Utah	22		50 km^{3} (12 cu mi)	10 km × 6 km (6.2 mi × 3.7 mi); Marysvale Volcanic Field; Delano Peak tuff	
Monroe Peak Caldera		Utah	23		200 km^{3} (48 cu mi)	20 km × 16 km (12.4 mi × 9.9 mi); Marysvale Volcanic Field; Osiris tuff	
Lake City calderas		Colorado	23.1		300 km^{3} (72 cu mi)	20 km (12 mi); San Juan volcanic field; Sunshine Peak tuff	
Turkey Creek Caldera	Cochise	Arizona	25		500 km^{3} (120 cu mi)	25 km (16 mi); Rhyolite Canyon Formation; Chiricahua National Monument	
Lake City calderas		Colorado	25.9		200 to 500 km^{3} (48 to 120 cu mi)	25 km (16 mi); San Juan volcanic field	
Questa Caldera	Taos	New Mexico	26		400 km^{3} (96 cu mi)	15 km (9.3 mi); Questa-Latir volcanic locus; Amalia tuff	
Creede Caldera		Colorado	26.7		500 km^{3} (120 cu mi)	24 km (15 mi); San Juan volcanic field; Wheeler Geologic Area; Snowshoe Mountain tuff	
San Luis Caldera Complex		Colorado	26.8		562 km^{3} (135 cu mi)	18 km (11 mi); San Juan volcanic field; Wheeler Geologic Area; Nelson Mountain tuff	
San Luis Caldera Complex		Colorado	26.9		250 km^{3} (60 cu mi)	18 km (11 mi); San Juan volcanic field; Wheeler Geologic Area; Cebola Creek tuff	
San Luis Caldera Complex		Colorado	27		150 km^{3} (36 cu mi)	18 km (11 mi); San Juan volcanic field; Wheeler Geologic Area; Rat Creek tuff	
Three Creeks Caldera		Utah	27		100 to 200 km^{3} (24 to 48 cu mi)	8 km (5.0 mi); Marysvale Volcanic Field; Cove Fort-Sulphurdale area; Three Creeks tuff	
South River Caldera		Colorado	27.1		500 km^{3} (120 cu mi)	San Juan volcanic field; Wheeler Geologic Area; Wason Park tuff	
Central San Juan Caldera		Colorado	27.2		250 km^{3} (60 cu mi)	San Juan volcanic field; Blue Creek tuff	
Bachelor Caldera		Colorado	27.35		1,200 km^{3} (290 cu mi)	20 km × 28 km (12 mi × 17 mi); San Juan volcanic field; Wheeler Geologic Area; Carpenter Ridge tuff	
Silverton Caldera		Colorado	27.6		50 to 100 km^{3} (12 to 24 cu mi)	20 km (12 mi); San Juan volcanic field; Crystal Lake tuff	
La Garita Caldera		Colorado	27.8	8	5,000 km^{3} (1,200 cu mi)	100 km × 35 km (62 mi × 22 mi); San Juan volcanic field; Wheeler Geologic Area; Fish Canyon tuff	
San Juan Caldera		Colorado	28		1,000 km^{3} (240 cu mi)	22 km × 24 km (14 mi × 15 mi); San Juan volcanic field; Sapinero Mesa tuff	
Uncompahgre Caldera		Colorado	28.1		1,000 km^{3} (240 cu mi)	23 km × 20 km (14 mi × 12 mi); Uncompahgre National Forest; San Juan volcanic field; Dillon/Sapinero Mesa tuff	
Lost Lake Caldera		Colorado	28.2		100 to 500 km^{3} (24 to 120 cu mi)	San Juan volcanic field; Blue Mesa tuff	
Platoro calderas		Colorado	28.2		1,000 km^{3} (240 cu mi)	San Juan volcanic field; Chiquito Peak tuff	
Central San Juan Caldera		Colorado	28.3		500 km^{3} (120 cu mi)	San Juan volcanic field; Masonic Park tuff	
Ute Creek Caldera		Colorado	28.3		500 km^{3} (120 cu mi)	Central Colorado volcanic field; Ute Ridge tuff	

Large-volume eruptions of the Southwestern Nevada volcanic field (SWNVF)
Caldera name	Age (Ma)	Volume	Notes	References
Black Mountain Caldera	7 ± 1	300 km^{3} (72 cu mi)	18 km (11 mi) wide; Thirsty Canyon tuff	
Timber Mountain caldera complex	11.45	900 km^{3} (220 cu mi)	30 km × 25 km (19 mi × 16 mi); Timber Mountain tuff – Ammonia Tanks member	
Timber Mountain caldera complex	11.6	1,200 km^{3} (290 cu mi)	Timber Mountain tuff – Rainer Mesa member	
Paintbrush Caldera	12.7	1,000 km^{3} (240 cu mi)	20 km (12 mi) wide; Paintbrush tuff – Topopah Spring member	
Paintbrush Caldera	12.8	1,200 km^{3} (288 cu mi)	Paintbrush tuff – Tiva Canyon member	
Silent Canyon Caldera	13	200 km^{3} (48 cu mi)	20 km × 16 km (12.4 mi × 9.9 mi)	
Crater Flat Group	13.25	650 km^{3} (156 cu mi)	Belted Range tuff	

=== List of Rupelian calderas ===
The Rupelian age/stage (Paleogene period/system, Oligocene epoch/series) spans the time between 33.9 ±0.1 Ma and 28.4 ±0.1 Ma (million years ago).

Large-Volume Eruptions in the Basin and Range Province
Name or Source	Counties	States	Age (Ma)	VEI	Volume	Notes	References
Bursum Caldera		New Mexico	28.5 ± 0.5		1,050 km^{3} (250 cu mi)	40 km × 30 km (25 mi × 19 mi); Mogollon-Datil volcanic field; Bloodgood Canyon tuff	
Bursum Caldera		New Mexico	28.5 ± 0.5		1,200 km^{3} (290 cu mi)	40 km × 30 km (25 mi × 19 mi); Mogollon-Datil volcanic field; Apache Springs tuff	
San Juan Caldera		Colorado	28.5		900 km^{3} (220 cu mi)	San Juan volcanic field	
Summitville Caldera		Colorado	28.5		100 to 500 km^{3} (24 to 120 cu mi)	12 km × 8 km (7.5 mi × 5.0 mi); San Juan volcanic field; Ojito Creek / La Jadero tuffs	
Mount Hope		Colorado	29		500 km^{3} (120 cu mi)	15 km (9.3 mi); San Juan volcanic field; Masonic Park tuff	
White Rock Caldera		Nevada	29.02 ± 0.04		2,600 km^{3} (620 cu mi)	50 km (31 mi); White Rock Mountains; Lund tuff	
Ute Creek		Colorado	29		500 km^{3} (120 cu mi)	8 km (5.0 mi); San Juan volcanic field; Ute Ridge tuff	
Platoro calderas	Conejos	Colorado	29.5		500 km^{3} (120 cu mi)	12 km × 18 km (7.5 mi × 11.2 mi); San Juan volcanic field; Black Mountain tuff	
Indian Peak		Nevada	29.5		3,200 km^{3} (770 cu mi)	Wah Wah Springs tuff	
Platoro calderas	Conejos	Colorado	30		592 km^{3} (142 cu mi)	18 km × 22 km (11 mi × 14 mi); San Juan volcanic field; La Jara Canyon tuff	
Goodsight–Cedar Hills volcano-tectonic depression		New Mexico	30.5 ± 1.5		295 km^{3} (71 cu mi)	Bell Top formation	
William's Ridge		Nevada	31.4		3,500 km^{3} (840 cu mi)	Windous Butte tuff	
North Pass Caldera		Colorado	32.25		400 to 500 km^{3} (96 to 120 cu mi)	Central Colorado volcanic field; Saguache Creek tuff	
Organ Caldera		New Mexico	32		500 km^{3} (120 cu mi)	16 km (9.9 mi); Cueva Soledad rhyolite	
Chinati Caldera		Texas	32.5 ± 0.5		1,000 km^{3} (240 cu mi)	30 km × 20 km (19 mi × 12 mi); Mitchel Mesa rhyolite	
Bonanza		Colorado	32.5		100 km^{3} (24 cu mi)	12 km (7.5 mi); Central Colorado volcanic field; Bonanza tuff	
Cowboy Rim	Hidalgo	New Mexico	33		500 km^{3} (120 cu mi)	26 km × 18 km (16 mi × 11 mi); Gillespie tuff	
Emory Caldera	Grant	New Mexico	33	8	1,310 km^{3} (310 cu mi)	25 km × 55 km (16 mi × 34 mi); Mogollon-Datil volcanic field; Kneeling Nun tuff	
Socorro Caldera	Socorro	New Mexico	33		500 km^{3} (120 cu mi)	25 km × 35 km (16 mi × 22 mi); Hells Mesa rhyolite	
Marshall Creek		Colorado	33.7		100 km^{3} (24 cu mi)	Thirtynine Mile volcanic area; Central Colorado volcanic field; Thorn Ranch tuff	
Mount Aetna		Colorado	33.81		100 km^{3} (24 cu mi)	10 km (6.2 mi); Central Colorado volcanic field; Badger Creek tuff	
Grizzly Peak Caldera		Colorado	34.31		100 km^{3} (24 cu mi)	12 km (7.5 mi); Central Colorado volcanic field; Grizzly Peak rhyolite	
Juniper Caldera	Hidalgo	New Mexico	35		500 km^{3} (120 cu mi)	Oak Creek Tuff	
Mount Princeton		Colorado	35.3 ± 0.6		1,000 km^{3} (240 cu mi)	Central Colorado volcanic field; Wall Mountain tuff	
Davis Mountains		Texas	35.35 ± 0.6		210 km^{3} (50 cu mi)	Wild Cherry tuff; Casket Mountain lava	
Davis Mountains		Texas	35.61 ± 0.09		200 km^{3} (48 cu mi)	Barrel Springs formation; Ash Flow tuff	
Quitman Caldera	Hudspeth	Texas	36		300 km^{3} (72 cu mi)	15 km × 10 km (9.3 mi × 6.2 mi); Square Peak volcanics	
Davis Mountains		Texas	36.2 ± 0.6		300 km^{3} (72 cu mi)	Mafic lavas	
Davis Mountains		Texas	36.33 ± 0.13		150 km^{3} (36 cu mi)	Paisano Volcano tephra	
Davis Mountains		Texas	36.51 ± 0.05		210 km^{3} (50 cu mi)	Adobe Canyon and Limpia formations	
Davis Mountains		Texas	36.82 ± 0.08		1,250 km^{3} (300 cu mi)	Flood rhyolites, rhyolite domes, and Gomez tuff	
Muir Caldera	Hidalgo	New Mexico	37		300 km^{3} (72 cu mi)	26 km × 18 km (16 mi × 11 mi); Woodhaul Canyon tephra	
Infernito Caldera		Texas	37.5 ± 0.5		85 km^{3} (20 cu mi)	12 km (7.5 mi); Buckshot tuff	
Thomas Caldera	Millard	Utah	39		400 km^{3} (96 cu mi)	16 km × 25 km (9.9 mi × 15.5 mi); Mount Laird tuff	
Twin Peaks Caldera	Custer	Idaho	45		500 km^{3} (120 cu mi)	20 km (12 mi); Challis volcanic field; Challis Creek tuff	
Van Horn cauldron complex	Custer	Idaho	46 ± 0.6			34 km × 48 km (21 mi × 30 mi); Challis volcanic field; Elis Creek tuff	
Silver Bell Caldera		Arizona	55.8			8 km (5.0 mi); Mount Laird tuff	
Silver Bell Caldera		Arizona	68		150 km^{3} (36 cu mi)	8 km (5.0 mi); Lithic tuff	
Tucson Mountain Caldera	Pima	Arizona	73		500 km^{3} (120 cu mi)	25 km (16 mi); Cat Mountain tuff	

== Sources ==
- Askren, Daniel R.; Michael F. Roden; James A. Whitney (August 1997). "Petrogenesis of Tertiary Andesite Lava Flows Interlayered with Large-Volume Felsic Ash-Flow Tuffs of the Western USA". Journal of Petrology. 38 (8): 1021–1046. Bibcode:1997JPet...38.1021A. doi:10.1093/petroj/38.8.1021.
- Ben G. Mason; David M. Pyle; Clive Oppenheimer (2004). "The size and frequency of the largest explosive eruptions on Earth". Bulletin of Volcanology. 66 (8): 735–748. Bibcode:2004BVol...66..735M. doi:10.1007/s00445-004-0355-9. S2CID 129680497.
- Best, M.G.; Christiansen, E.H. & Blank, R.H. Jr. (1989). "Oligocene caldera complex and calc-alkaline tuffs and lavas of the Indian Peak volcanic field, Nevada and Utah". Bull. Geol. Soc. Am. 101 (8): 1076–1090. Bibcode:1989GSAB..101.1076B. doi:10.1130/0016-7606(1989)101<1076:occaca>2.3.co;2.
- Best, M.G.; Scott, R.B.; Rowley, P.D.; Swadley, W.C.; Anderson, R.E.; Gromme, C.S.; Harding, A.E.; Deino, A.L.; Christiansen, E.H.; Tingey, D.G. & Sullivan, K.R. (1993), "Oligocene–Miocene caldera complexes, ash-flow sheets, and tectonism in the central and southeastern Great Basin", in Lahren, M.M.; Trexler, J.H. & Spinosa, C. (eds.), Crustal Evolution of the Great Basin and the Sierra Nevada, Field Trip Guidebook for Cordilleran/Rocky Mountain Sections of the Geol. Soc. Am., Reno: University of Nevada, pp. 285–312
- Bove, D.J.; Hon, K.; Budding, K.E.; Slack, J.F.; Snee, L.W.; Yeoman, R.A. (2001). "Geochronology and geology of late Oligocene through Miocene volcanism and mineralization in the Western San Juan Mountains, Colorado". USGS Professional Paper. 1642: 1–30.
- Matthew E. Brueseke & William K. Hart (2008). "Geology and Petrology of the Mid-Miocene Santa Rosa-Calico Volcanic Field, Northern Nevada" (PDF). Nevada Bureau of Mines and Geology Bulletin. 113: 44. Archived from the original (PDF) on 2010-06-07.
- Castor, S.B. & Henry, C.D. (2000). "Geology, geochemistry, and origin of volcanic rock-hosted uranium deposits in northwest Nevada and southeastern Oregon, USA". Ore Geology Review. 16 (1–2): 1–40. Bibcode:2000OGRv...16....1C. doi:10.1016/S0169-1368(99)00021-9.
- Chapin, C.E.; Wilks, M.; McIntosh, W.C. (2004). "Space-time patterns of Late Cretaceous to present magmatism in New Mexico—comparison with Andean volcanism and potential for future volcanism" (PDF). New Mexico Bureau of Geology and Mineral Resources Bulletin. 160: 13–40. Archived from the original (PDF) on 2010-06-09.
- Matthew A. Coble & Gail A. Mahood (2008). New geologic evidence for additional 16.5–15.5 Ma silicic calderas in northwest Nevada related to initial impingement of the Yellowstone hot spot (PDF). Earth and Environmental Science. Vol. 3. Collapse Calderas Workshop, IOP Conf. Series. p. 012002. Bibcode:2008E&ES....3a2002C. doi:10.1088/1755-1307/3/1/012002.
- Deal, E.G.; Elston, W. E.; Elston, E.E.; Peterson, S.L.; Reiter, D. E. (1978). "Cenozoic volcanic geology of the Basin and Range province in Hidalgo County, southwestern New Mexico". New Mexico Geol. Soc. Guidebook 29th Field Conference: 219–229.
- Elston, W.E.; Seager, W.R.; Clemons, R.E. (1975). "Emory cauldron, Black Range, New Mexico, source of the Kneeling Nun Tuff". Field Conf Guide, New Mexico Geological Society. 26: 283–292.
- Erb, E.E. Jr. (1979). Petrologic and structural evolution of ash-flow tuff cauldrons and noncauldron related volcanic rocks in the Animas and southern Peloncillo Mountains, Hidalgo County, New Mexico. Albuquerque: University of New Mexico.
- Farmer, G.L.; Broxton, D.E.; Warren, R.G.; Pickthorn, W. (1991). "Nd, Sr, and O isotopic variations in metaluminous ash-flow tuffs and related volcanic rocks at the Timber Mountains/Oasis Valley caldera complex, SW Nevada: implications for the origin and evolution of large-volume silicic magma bodies". Contributions to Mineralogy and Petrology. 109 (1): 53–68. Bibcode:1991CoMP..109...53F. doi:10.1007/BF00687200. S2CID 140682518.
- Gregory, K.M. & McIntosh, W.C. (1996). "Paleoclimate and paleoelevation of the Oligocene Pitch-Pinnacle flora, Sawatch Range, Colorado". Bull. Geol. Soc. Am. 108 (5): 545–561. Bibcode:1996GSAB..108..545G. doi:10.1130/0016-7606(1996)108<0545:papoto>2.3.co;2.
- Hardyman, R.F. (1981). "Twin Peaks caldera of central Idaho". Montana Geological Society 1981 Field Conference on Southwest Montana: 317–322.
- Heiken, G.; Goff, F.; Gardner, J.N.; Baldridge, W.S.; Hulen, J.B.; Nielson, D.L.; Vaniman, D. (1990). "The Valles/Toledo Caldera Complex, Jemez Volcanic Field, New Mexico". Annu. Rev. Earth Planet. Sci. 18: 27–53. Bibcode:1990AREPS..18...27H. doi:10.1146/annurev.ea.18.050190.000331.
- Henry, C.D.; Kunk, M.J.; McIntosh, W.C. (1994). "40 Ar/ 39 Ar chronology and volcanology of silicic volcanism in the Davis Mountains, Trans-Pecos Texas". Geological Society of America Bulletin. 106 (11): 1359–1376. Bibcode:1994GSAB..106.1359H. doi:10.1130/0016-7606(1994)106<1359:aacavo>2.3.co;2.
- Henry, C.D. & Price, J.G. (1984). "Variations in caldera development in the Tertiary volcanic field of trans-Pecos Texas". J. Geophys. Res. 89 (B10): 8765–8786. Bibcode:1984JGR....89.8765H. doi:10.1029/JB089iB10p08765.
- Hildreth, W. (1979). "The Bishop Tuff: Evidence for the origin of compositional zonation in silicic magma chambers". Geol. Soc. Am. Spec. Pap. Geological Society of America Special Papers. 180: 43–75. doi:10.1130/spe180-p43. ISBN 978-0-8137-2180-4.
- Izett, Glen A. (1981). "Volcanic Ash Beds: Recorders of Upper Cenozoic Silicic Pyroclastic Volcanism in the Western United States". Journal of Geophysical Research. 86 (B11): 10200–10222. Bibcode:1981JGR....8610200I. doi:10.1029/JB086iB11p10200.
- Korringa, Marjorie K. (December 1973). "Linear vent area of the Soldier Meadow Tuff, an ash-flow sheet in northwestern Nevada". Geological Society of America Bulletin. 84 (12): 3849–3866. Bibcode:1973GSAB...84.3849K. doi:10.1130/0016-7606(1973)84<3849:LVAOTS>2.0.CO;2.
- Latta, J.S. IV (1983). "Geochemistry and petrology of the ash flows of Chiricahua National Monument, Arizona and their relation to the Turkey Creek Caldera". M.S. Thesis. University of Arizona, Tucson: 194.
- Maughan, Larissa L.; Christiansen, Eric H.; Best, Myron G.; Grommé, C. Sherman; Deino, Alan L.; Tingey, David G. (2002). "The Oligocene Lund Tuff, Great Basin, USA: a very large volume monotonous intermediate". J. Volcanol. Geotherm. Res. 113 (1–2): 129–157. Bibcode:2002JVGR..113..129M. doi:10.1016/s0377-0273(01)00256-6.
- McIntosh, W.C. & Chapin, C.E. (2004). "Geochronology of the central Colorado volcanic field". Bull. New Mexico Bur. Geol. Min. Res. 160: 205–237.
- McKee, E. H. (1971). "Tertiary Igneous Chronology of the Great Basin of Western United States–Implications for Tectonic Models". Geological Society of America Bulletin. 82 (12): 3497–3502. Bibcode:1971GSAB...82.3497M. doi:10.1130/0016-7606(1971)82[3497:ticotg]2.0.co;2.
- Morgan, L.A.; Doherty, D.J.; Leeman, W.P. (1984). "Ignimbrites of the Eastern Snake River Plain: evidence for major caldera-forming eruptions". J. Geophys. Res. 89 (B10): 8665–8678. Bibcode:1984JGR....89.8665M. doi:10.1029/JB089iB10p08665.
- Moye, F.J.; Hackett, W.R.; Blakley, J.D.; Snider, L.G. (1988). "Regional geologic setting and volcanic stratigraphy of the Challis Volcanic Field, Central Idaho". Idaho Geological Survey Bulletin. 27: 87–97.
- Noble, D.C. (1988), "Cenozoic volcanic rocks of the northwestern Great Basin: an overview", Spring Field Trip Guidebook, Special Publication No. 7, Geological Society of Nevada, pp. 31–42
- Osburn, G.R. & Chapin, C.E. (1983). "Ash-flow tuffs and cauldrons in the northeast Mogollon-Datil volcanic field: A summary". Field Conference Guide of the New Mexico Geological Society. 34: 197–204.
- Min, K.; Reiners, P.W.; Nicolescu, S.; Wolff, J.A.; Mundil, R.; Winters, L.R. (2004). "(U-Th)/He dating of volcanic phenocrysts with high-(U-Th) inclusions, Bandelier Tuff, New Mexico". Eos, Transactions, American Geophysical Union. 85 (Abstract V43E–1450): V43E–1450. Bibcode:2004AGUFM.V43E1450M.
- Sawyer, David A.; R. J. Fleck; M. A. Lanphere; R. G. Warren; D. E. Broxton & Mark R. Hudson (October 1994). "Episodic caldera volcanism in the Miocene southwestern Nevada volcanic field: Revised stratigraphic framework, 40Ar/39Ar geochronology, and implications for magmatism and extension". Geological Society of America Bulletin. 106 (10): 1304–1318. Bibcode:1994GSAB..106.1304S. doi:10.1130/0016-7606(1994)106<1304:ECVITM>2.3.CO;2.
- Ratté, J.C.; Marvin, R.F.; Naeser, C.W. (1984). "Calderas and ash flow tuffs of the Mogollan Mountains, southwestern New Mexico". J. Geophys. Res. 89 (B10): 8713–8732. Bibcode:1984JGR....89.8713R. doi:10.1029/JB089iB10p08713.
- Rytuba, James J.; John, David A.; McKee, Edwin H. (May 3–5, 2004). "Volcanism Associated with Eruption of the Steens Basalt and Inception of the Yellowstone Hotspot". The Geological Society of America (Abstract). Archived from the original on 2010-12-23.
- Sarna-Wojcicki, A.M.; Pringle, M.S.; Wijbrans, J. (2000). "New 40Ar/39Ar age of the Bishop Tuff from multiple sites and sediment rate calibration for the Matuyama-Brunhes boundary". J. Geophys. Res. 105 (B9): 21431–21443. Bibcode:2000JGR...10521431S. doi:10.1029/2000JB900901.
- Seager, W.R. (1973). "Resurgent volcano-tectonic depression of Oligocene age, south-central New Mexico". Bull. Geol. Soc. Am. 84 (11): 3611–3626. Bibcode:1973GSAB...84.3611S. doi:10.1130/0016-7606(1973)84<3611:rvdooa>2.0.co;2.
- Seager, W.R. (1981). "Geology of Oregon Mountains and southern San Andreas Mountains, New Mexico". Memoir of the New Mexico Bureau of Mineral Resources. 36: 1–97.
- Sigurdsson, H. (2000), "Volcanic episodes and rates of volcanism", in Sigurdsson, H. (ed.), Encyclopedia of volcanoes, San Diego: Academic Press, pp. 271–279
- Smith, R.L. & Luedke, R.G. (1984). "Potentially active volcanic lineaments and loci in western conterminous United States". Explosive Volcanism: Inception, Evolution, and Hazard. National Research Council, Geophysics Study Committee. pp. 47–66. ISBN 978-0-309-03393-0.
- Steven, T.A. & Ratte, J.C. (1965). "Geology and structural control of ore deposition in the Creede district, San Juan Mountains, Colorado". USGS Professional Paper. 487: 90. Bibcode:1965usgs.rept...10S. doi:10.3133/pp487.
- Varga, R.J. & Smith, B.M. (1984). "Evolution of the early oligocene Bonanza caldera, northeast San Juan volcanic field, Colorado". J. Geophys. Res. 89 (B10): 8679–8694. Bibcode:1984JGR....89.8679V. doi:10.1029/JB089iB10p08679.
- Ward, Peter L. (2 April 2009). "Sulfur Dioxide Initiates Global Climate Change in Four Ways" (PDF). Thin Solid Films. 517 (11): 3188–3203. Bibcode:2009TSF...517.3188W. doi:10.1016/j.tsf.2009.01.005. Archived from the original (PDF) on 20 January 2010.
  - "Supplementary Table to P.L. Ward, Thin Solid Films (2009) Major volcanic eruptions and provinces" (PDF). Teton Tectonics. Archived from the original (PDF) on 2010-01-20.
  - "Supplementary References to P.L. Ward, Thin Solid Films (2009)" (PDF). Teton Tectonics. Archived from the original (PDF) on 2010-01-20.

=== Columbia River Basalt Province-sources ===
- Brueseke, M.E.; Heizler, M.T.; Hart, W.K. & S.A. Mertzman (15 March 2007). "Distribution and geochronology of Oregon Plateau (U.S.A.) flood basalt volcanism: The Steens Basalt revisited". Journal of Volcanology and Geothermal Research. 161 (3): 187–214. Bibcode:2007JVGR..161..187B. doi:10.1016/j.jvolgeores.2006.12.004.
- Camp, V.E. & Ross, M.E. (2000). "Mapping the Steens-Columbia River Basalt Connection: Implications for the extent, volume, and magma supply rate of CRB volcanism". Geol. Soc. Am. Abstr. Programs. 32: A159.
- Carson, Robert J.; Pogue, Kevin R. (1996). Flood Basalts and Glacier Floods:Roadside Geology of Parts of Walla Walla, Franklin, and Columbia Counties, Washington. Washington State Department of Natural Resources (Washington Division of Geology and Earth Resources Information Circular 90). ISBN none.
- Jarboe, N.A.; Coe, R.S.; Renne, P.R.; Glen, J.M. (2006). "40Ar/39Ar ages of the Early Columbia River Basalt Group: Determining the Steens Mountain Geomagnetic Polarity Reversal (R0-N0) as the top of the C5Cr Chron and the Imnaha Normal (N0) as the C5Cn.3n Chron". Eos, Transactions, American Geophysical Union. 87 (Abstract V51D–1702): V51D–1702. Bibcode:2006AGUFM.V51D1702J.
- Camp, Victor E.; Martin E. Ross; William E. Hanson (January 2003). "Genesis of flood basalts and Basin and Range volcanic rocks from Steens Mountain to the Malheur River Gorge, Oregon". Geological Society of America Bulletin. 115 (1): 105–128. Bibcode:2003GSAB..115..105C. doi:10.1130/0016-7606(2003)115<0105:gofbab>2.0.co;2.
- Reidel, Stephen P. (January 2005). A Lava Flow without a Source: The Cohasset Flow and Its Compositional Members. The Journal of Geology, Volume 113, Pp 1 – 21. ISBN none.
- Web citations:
  - "Southeast Oregon Basin and Range". SummitPost.org.
  - "Andesitic and basaltic rocks on Steens Mountain". USGS.
  - "Oregon: A Geologic History. 8. Columbia River Basalt: the Yellowstone hot spot arrives in a flood of fire". Oregon Department of Geology and Mineral Industries. Archived from the original on June 3, 2011.

=== Peter W. Lipman – sources ===
- Lipman, Peter W. (1969). "Alkalic and tholeiitic basaltic volcanism related to the Rio Grande Depression, Southern Colorado and Northern New Mexico". Geological Society of America Bulletin. 80 (7): 1343–1354. Bibcode:1969GSAB...80.1343L. doi:10.1130/0016-7606(1969)80[1343:aatbvr]2.0.co;2.
- Lipman, Peter W.; Prostka, H.J.; Christiansen, R.L. (1972). "Cenozoic volcanism and plate-tectonic evolution of the Western United States: I. Early and middle Cenozoic". Philosophical Transactions of the Royal Society A: Mathematical, Physical and Engineering Sciences. 271 (1213): 217–248. Bibcode:1972RSPTA.271..217L. doi:10.1098/rsta.1972.0008. JSTOR 74007. S2CID 91504527.
- R. L. Christiansen & P. W. Lipman (1972). "Cenozoic Volcanism and Plate-Tectonic Evolution of the Western United States. II. Late Cenozoic". Philosophical Transactions of the Royal Society A: Mathematical, Physical and Engineering Sciences. 271 (1213): 249–284. Bibcode:1972RSPTA.271..249C. doi:10.1098/rsta.1972.0009. JSTOR 74008. S2CID 91755783.
- Lipman, Peter W.; Steven, T.A.; Luedke, R.G.; Burbank, W.S. (1973). "Revised volcanic history of the San Juan, Uncompahgre, Silverton, and Lake City calderas in the western San Juan Mountains, Colorado". J. Res. U. S. Geol. Surv. 1: 627–642.
- Lipman, Peter W. (1975). "Evolution of the Platoro caldera complex and related volcanic rocks, southeastern San Juan Mountains, Colorado". USGS Professional Paper. 852: 1–128. Bibcode:1975usgs.rept....5L.
- Lipman, Peter W. (1976). "Caldera-collapse breccias in the western San Juan Mountains, Colorado". Geol. Soc. Am. Bull. 87 (10): 1397–1410. Bibcode:1976GSAB...87.1397L. doi:10.1130/0016-7606(1976)87<1397:cbitws>2.0.co;2.
- Steven, T.A. & Lipman, Peter W. (1976). "Calderas of the San Juan volcanic field, southwestern Colorado". USGS Professional Paper. 958: 35.
- Lipman, Peter W. & Mehnert, H.H. (1979), "The Taos Plateau volcanic field, northern Rio Grande rift, New Mexico", in Riecker, R.E. (ed.), Rio Grande rift – Tectonics and magmatism, Washington, D.C.: American Geophysical Union, pp. 289–311
- Sawyer, D.A. & Lipman, Peter W. (1983). "Silver Bell Mountains, Arizona- porphyry copper mineralization in a late Cretaceous caldera". Eos, Transactions, American Geophysical Union. 64: 874.
- Lipman, Peter W. (September 30, 1984). "The Roots of Ash Flow Calderas in Western North America: Windows Into the Tops of Granitic Batholiths" (PDF). Journal of Geophysical Research. 89 (B10): 8801–8841. Bibcode:1984JGR....89.8801L. doi:10.1029/JB089iB10p08801.
- Lipman, Peter W.; Mehnert, H.H.; Naeser, C.W (1986). "Evolution of the Latir volcanic field, northern New Mexico, and its relation to the Rio Grande rift, as indicated by potassium-argon and fission track dating". Journal of Geophysical Research. 91 (B6): 6329–6345. Bibcode:1986JGR....91.6329L. doi:10.1029/JB091iB06p06329.
- Thompson, R.A.; Dungan, M.A.; Lipman, Peter W. (1986). "Multiple differentiation processes in early-rift calc-alkaline volcanics, northern Rio Grande rift, New Mexico". Journal of Geophysical Research. 91 (B6): 6046–6058. Bibcode:1986JGR....91.6046T. doi:10.1029/JB091iB06p06046.
- Lipman, Peter W. & Reed, J.C. Jr. (1989). "Geologic map of the Latir volcanic field and adjacent areas, northern New Mexico". U.S. Geological Survey Miscellaneous Investigations Series. Map I-1907 (Scale 1:48000): 16. Bibcode:1989usgs.rept...16L. doi:10.3133/i1907.
- Hon, K. & Lipman, Peter W. (1989), "Western San Juan caldera complex", in Lipman, Peter W. (ed.), Excursion 16B: Oligocene-Miocene San Juan volcanic field, Colorado, vol. 46, New Mexico Bureau of Mines and Mineral Resources Memoir, pp. 350–380
- Lipman, Peter W. & W. S. Baldridge (1990), "Taos, New Mexico", in C. A. Wood & J. Kienle (eds.), Volcanoes of North America, Cambridge University Press, pp. 290–292
- Lipman, Peter W. & Glazner, Allen F. (1991), "Introduction to middle Tertiary Cordilleran volcanism—Magma sources and relations to regional tectonics", Journal of Geophysical Research, 96 (B8): 13193–13199, Bibcode:1991JGR....9613193L, doi:10.1029/91JB01397
- Lipman, Peter W.; Dungan, M.A.; Brown, L.L.; Deino, A.L. (1996). "Recurrent eruption and subsidence at the Platoro Caldera complex, southeastern San Juan volcanic field, Colorado; new tales from old tuffs". Geol. Soc. Am. Bull. 108 (8): 1039–1055. Bibcode:1996GSAB..108.1039L. doi:10.1130/0016-7606(1996)108<1039:reasat>2.3.co;2.
- Lipman, Peter W. (2000), "Calderas", in Sigurdsson, H. (ed.), Encyclopedia of volcanoes, San Diego: Academic Press, pp. 643–662, ISBN 978-0-12-643140-7
- Olivier Bachmann; Michael A. Dungan; Peter W. Lipman (2002). "The Fish Canyon Magma Body, San Juan Volcanic Field, Colorado: Rejuvenation and Eruption of an Upper-Crustal Batholith". Journal of Petrology. 43 (8): 1469–1503. Bibcode:2002JPet...43.1469B. doi:10.1093/petrology/43.8.1469.
- Lipman, Peter W. & Calvert, A. (2003). "Southward migration of mid-Tertiary volcanism: Relations in the Cochetopa Area, North-Central San Juan Mountains, Colorado". Geol. Soc. Am. Abstr. Programs. 35: 14.
- Peter W. Lipman; William C. McIntosh (July 2008). "Eruptive and noneruptive calderas, northeastern San Juan Mountains, Colorado: Where did the ignimbrites come from?". Geological Society of America Bulletin. 120 (7–8): 771–795. Bibcode:2008GSAB..120..771L. doi:10.1130/B26330.1.

=== Maps ===
- Overview map at Basin and Range Province.
- Map of the Basin and Range Province
- Map: Thelin and Pike (1991), Landforms of the conterminous United States – A digital shaded-relief portrayal, USGS Map I-2206
- Global Positioning System (GPS) Time Series
- Great Basin/Nevada
  - Steve Ludington; Dennis P. Cox; Kenneth W. Leonard & Barry C. Moring (1996), "Chapter 5, Cenozoic Volcanic Geology in Nevada", in Donald A. Singer (ed.), An Analysis of Nevada's Metal-Bearing Mineral Resources, Nevada Bureau of Mines and Geology, University of Nevada
  - Potter, Christopher J.; Dickerson, Robert P.; Sweetkind, Donald S.; Drake, Ronald M. II; Taylor, Emily M.; Fridrich, Christopher J.; San, Carma A. Juan; Day, Warren C. (2002). Geologic map of the Yucca Mountain region, Nye County, Nevada: U.S. Geological Survey Geologic Investigations Series. Vol. I-2755. Denver, Colorado: U.S. Geological Survey.
  - Matthew E. Brueseke & William K. Hart (2008). Geology and Petrology of the Mid-Miocene Santa Rosa-Calico Volcanic Field, northern Nevada (PDF). Reno, Nevada: Mackay School of Earth Sciences and Engineering College of Science, University of Nevada. Archived from the original (PDF) on 2010-06-07.
    - Supplemental material: Columbia River Basalt Group, eruptive loci
- Great Basin/Utah
  - Rowley, Peter D.; Cunningham, Charles G.; Steven, Thomas A.; Workman, Jeremiah B.; Anderson, John J.; Theissen, Kevin M. (2002). Geologic Map of the Central Marysvale Volcanic Field, Southwestern Utah: U.S. Geological Survey Geologic Investigations Series. Vol. I-2645-A. Denver, Colorado: U. S. Geological Survey.
- Colorado
  - William C. McIntosh & Charles E. Chapin (2004). "Geochronology of the central Colorado volcanic field". Tectonics, geochronology, and volcanism in the Southern Rocky Mountains and Rio Grande rift (PDF). Socorro, NM: New Mexico Bureau of Geology and Mineral Resources, New Mexico Institute of Mining and Technology. pp. 205–238. Archived from the original (PDF) on 2010-06-09.
  - Robinson, Joel E.; Dillon R. Dutton; David W. Ramsey; Peter W. Lipman; Tracey J. Felger (2006). Geologic Map of the Central San Juan Caldera Cluster, Southwestern Colorado: Geologic Investigations Series. Vol. I-2799. U.S. Geological Survey.
- New Mexico
  - "The Taos Plateau Volcanic Field". New Mexico Museum of Natural History and Science.
  - Crumpler, L. S. & Lucas, S. G. (2001). "Volcanoes of New Mexico: An Abbreviated Guide For Non-Specialists" (PDF). Volcanology in New Mexico. New Mexico Museum of Natural History and Science Bulletin. 18: 5–15. Archived from the original (PDF) on 2007-03-21.
  - Mogollon-Datil volcanic field
    - "Gila Cliff Dwellings National Monument". New Mexico Bureau of Geology & Mineral Resources. citing from Chapin, C.E.; McIntosh, W.C. & Chamberlin, R.M. (2004), "The Late Eocene—Oligocene peak of Cenozoic volcanism in southwestern New Mexico", in Mack, G.H. & Giles, K.A. (eds.), The Geology of New Mexico, a Geologic History, vol. 11, New Mexico Geological Society Special Publication, pp. 271–294
