= John E. Weyss =

American painter

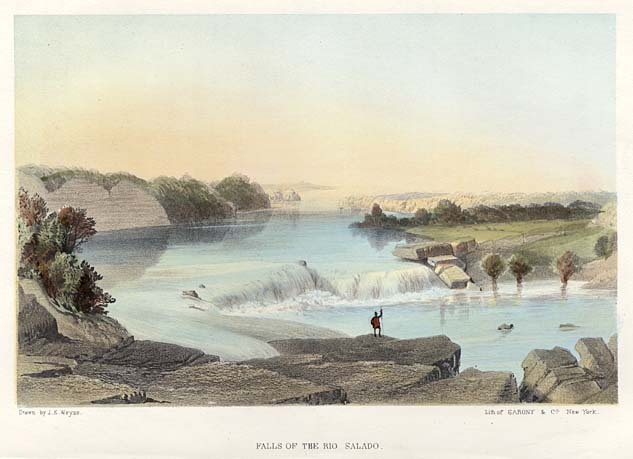
"Waterfall on the Rio Salado" drawn by Weyss on Mexican Boundary Survey

Major John E. Weyss (c. 1820 – 24 June 1903), was an American artist, cartographer and engineer who served with the U.S. Corps of Topographical Engineers for some 40 years.

John E. Weyss was born in Vienna, Austrian Empire, in about 1820 and emigrated to New York City in 1848, during the German revolution. He soon moved to Washington, D.C., and joined the Smithsonian Institution.

== Mexican Boundary Survey ==
In the early 1850s, Weyss joined the government's Mexican Boundary Survey, working under the direction of U.S. Army topographical engineer William H. Emory. Weyss served as an illustrator, drawing a "series of outline sketches that portrayed the entire length of the boundary line, so that even if the stone markers should be removed, some idea of their location would remain." In addition, his drawings served to document the topography and vegetation found along the border. Weyss also developed his surveying skills and contributed to eleven of the maps that appeared in the "Report on the United States and Mexican Boundary Survey" of which the first volume was published in 1857. On the expedition, Weyss worked closely with Emory's chief assistant, Nathaniel Michler, an officer in the Topographical Engineers. Their association would continue throughout their careers.

== Civil War ==
When the Civil War started, Weyss was working for the state of Kentucky as a civil engineer. He received a commission as major from the Governor. Due to his prewar experience, Weyss was assigned to the staff of his former supervisor on the Mexican Boundary Survey, Captain Nathaniel Michler, chief topographical engineer in the Army of the Ohio. He served as Michler's principal assistant and from April 8 until June 6, 1862, Weyss surveyed maps in the vicinity of Shiloh, Corinth and Iuka.

Weyss was in charge of detailed mapping at Petersburg when it was besieged during the American Civil War.

In 1866, Weyss joined with Michler to survey the major battlefields in the eastern theater. Weyss led the efforts in Virginia, completing the mapping of important battle sites in December 1867. Their results were published in 1869 under the title "Military maps illustrating the operations of the armies of the Potomac & James".

== Later years ==
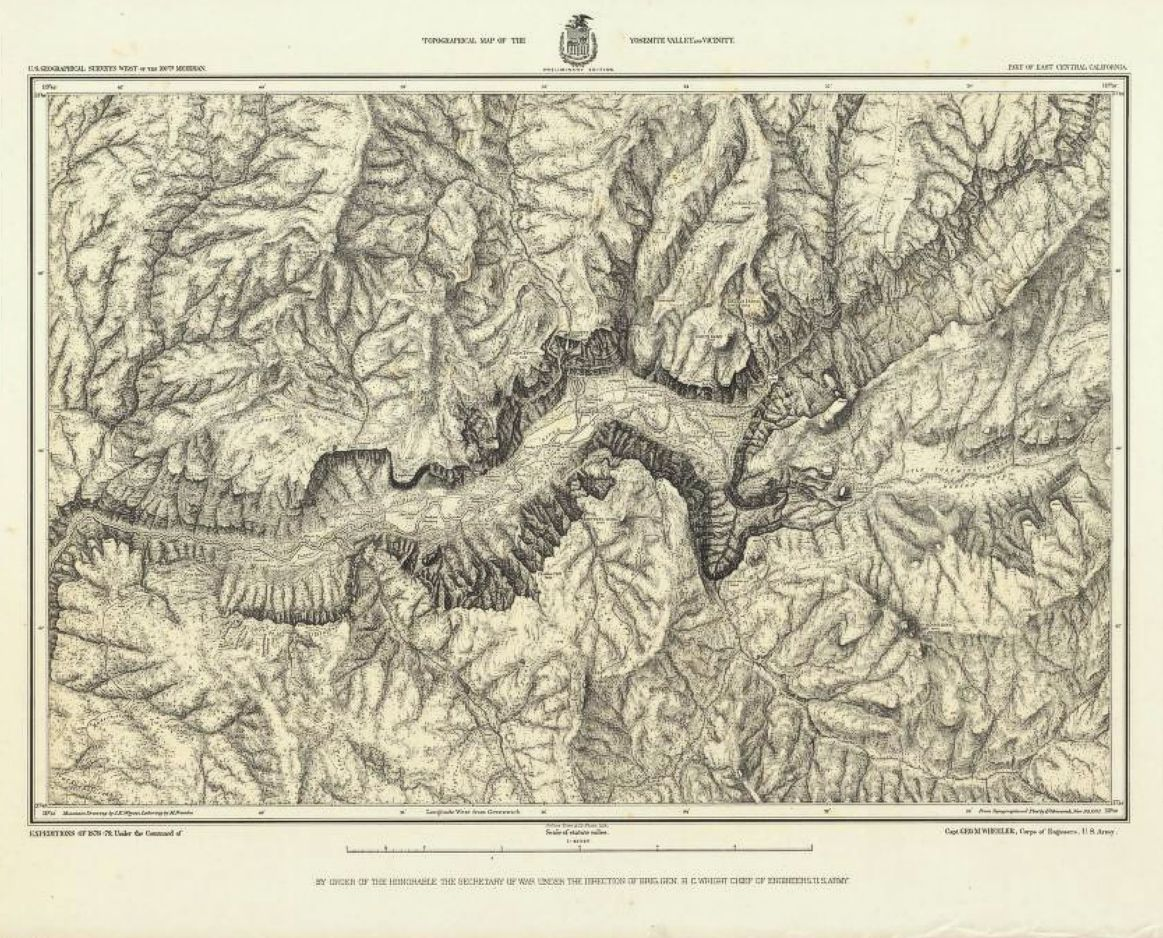
Map of Yosemite Valley drawn by Weyss during Wheeler Survey

In the 1870s, Weyss joined the Wheeler Survey, led by Captain George M. Wheeler of the U.S. Army Corps of Engineers. The project was an ambitious effort funded by Congress to map the United States west of the 100th meridian. It was the last of the great western surveys carried out by the Corps of Engineers. Weyss was credited on maps and illustrations that accompanied the Wheeler's report “West of the 100th Meridian of Longitude.” He remained with the Army Corps of Engineers and the U.S. Geographical Survey for forty years until his resignation in 1880s.

Weyss died on June 24, 1903, in Washington DC. One obituary called him "the last of the 'Old Topographers' who connected us with the early explorers of our domain."
