= Fibla carpenteri =

Fibla carpenteri Temporal range: Middle Eocene

Scientific classification
- Domain: Eukaryota
- Kingdom: Animalia
- Phylum: Arthropoda
- Class: Insecta
- Order: Raphidioptera
- Family: Inocelliidae
- Genus: Fibla
- Subgenus: Fibla
- Species: †F. carpenteri

Binomial name
- †Fibla carpenteri Engel, 1995

Extinct species of insect

Fibla carpenteri is an extinct species of snakefly in the Inocelliidae genus Fibla. F. carpenteri is named in honor of the paleoentomologist Dr Frank Carpenter, for his vast knowledge and interest in Raphidioptera.

The species is known from a single specimen, the holotype, deposited in the Harvard University, Museum of Comparative Zoology as specimen #9999. Dr. Michael S. Engel first studied and described the species after finding the specimen in the Harvard collections. He published his type description in the journal Psyche volume 102 published in 1995. Fairly well preserved in Eocene Baltic amber, the female individual has a torn forewing missing the distal portion, partial antennae, and the ovipositor is severed and missing the tip. There are also a number of small areas with "schimmel", a type of white mold sometimes present on arthropods in amber. With a total length, not including ovipositor or antennae, of just over 18 millimetres (0.71 in), Fibla carpenteri is the largest species of snakefly from amber and the largest species of the genus. As a whole the female shows no light color marking and was a fairly uniform dark brown to black coloration. The wings are hyaline with brown coloration of the vein structure and are slightly fuscous at the base. The pterostigma is also colored brown.

F. carpenteri is one of only four extinct Fibla which are known from the fossil record. Along with F. erigena F. carpenteri is one of two known from the baltic amber deposits, while F. cerdanica is from the Miocene of Spain and F. exusta is from the Eocene of the Florissant Formation, Colorado.
