= Electrinocellia =

Electrinocellia Temporal range: Middle Eocene

Scientific classification
- Kingdom: Animalia
- Phylum: Arthropoda
- Clade: Pancrustacea
- Class: Insecta
- Order: Raphidioptera
- Family: Inocelliidae
- Subfamily: †Electrinocellinae
- Genus: †Electrinocellia; Engel, 1995
- Species: †E. peculiaris

Binomial name
- †Electrinocellia peculiaris (Carpenter, 1956)

Synonyms
- Inocellia peculiaris Carpenter, 1956

Extinct genus of insects

Electrinocellia is an extinct monotypic genus of snakefly in the family Inocelliidae containing the single species Electrinocellia peculiaris and known from Eocene aged Baltic amber.

== History and classification ==
The genus is known from only the holotype, a single dark brown male specimen, deposited in the Harvard University Museum of Comparative Zoology as specimen number 51. The specimen was first studied and described by the prolific paleoentomologist Dr. Frank M. Carpenter, while he was curator of the Harvard paleoentomological collections. The genus was named from the Latin electrum meaning "amber" and Inocellia, the type genus for Inocelliidae. The species name peculiaris is a reference to the enigmatic nature of the species when first studied.

When first described the species was placed in Inocellia as Inocellia peculiaris. In his type description of the species, Dr. Carpenter noted a number of odd features which do not conform well with extant Inocellia species. The specimen possesses antennae placed far back on the head, lacks ocelli, a pterostigma without crossvein, all structures found in Inocellia. The genitalia are also very close in structure to Inocellia. However the species also has distinct vein structures, and an overall head shape which is less quadrate, features not found in Inocellia. The size of the specimen is also notably smaller than other species of Inocellia, the fore wing being only 6 millimetres (0.24 in) long and 1.8 millimetres (0.071 in) wide. Dr. Carpenter therefore placed the species in Inocellia and noted his reservations regarding the placement but did not feel that the differences were enough to warrant creation of a new genus.

Though they did not move the species to a new genus, Horst Aspöck, Ulrike Aspöck and Hubert Rausch in the 1991 work Die Raphidiopteren der Erde also noted the very odd nature of the species and questioned its placement in Inocellia. Dr Michael S. Engel restudied the type specimen and moved the species in a 1995 paper published in the entomology journal Psyche, 39 years after the type description was published in the same journal. Dr. Engel, noting the oddities moved the species to a new genus Electrinocellia which he in turn placed in the monotypic subfamily Electrinocellinae. This subfamily is a sister taxon to the rest of the genera in Inocelliidae, which are in the subfamily Inocelliidinae.
