= Negha meridionalis =

Scientific classification
- Domain: Eukaryota
- Kingdom: Animalia
- Phylum: Arthropoda
- Class: Insecta
- Order: Raphidioptera
- Family: Inocelliidae
- Genus: Negha
- Species: N. meridionalis

Binomial name
- Negha meridionalis U. Aspöck, 1988

Species of insect

Negha meridionalis is a species of square-headed snakefly in the family Inocelliidae. It is found in North America.
