= Guffey, Colorado =

Census-designated place in Park County, CO, USA

- Census-designated place
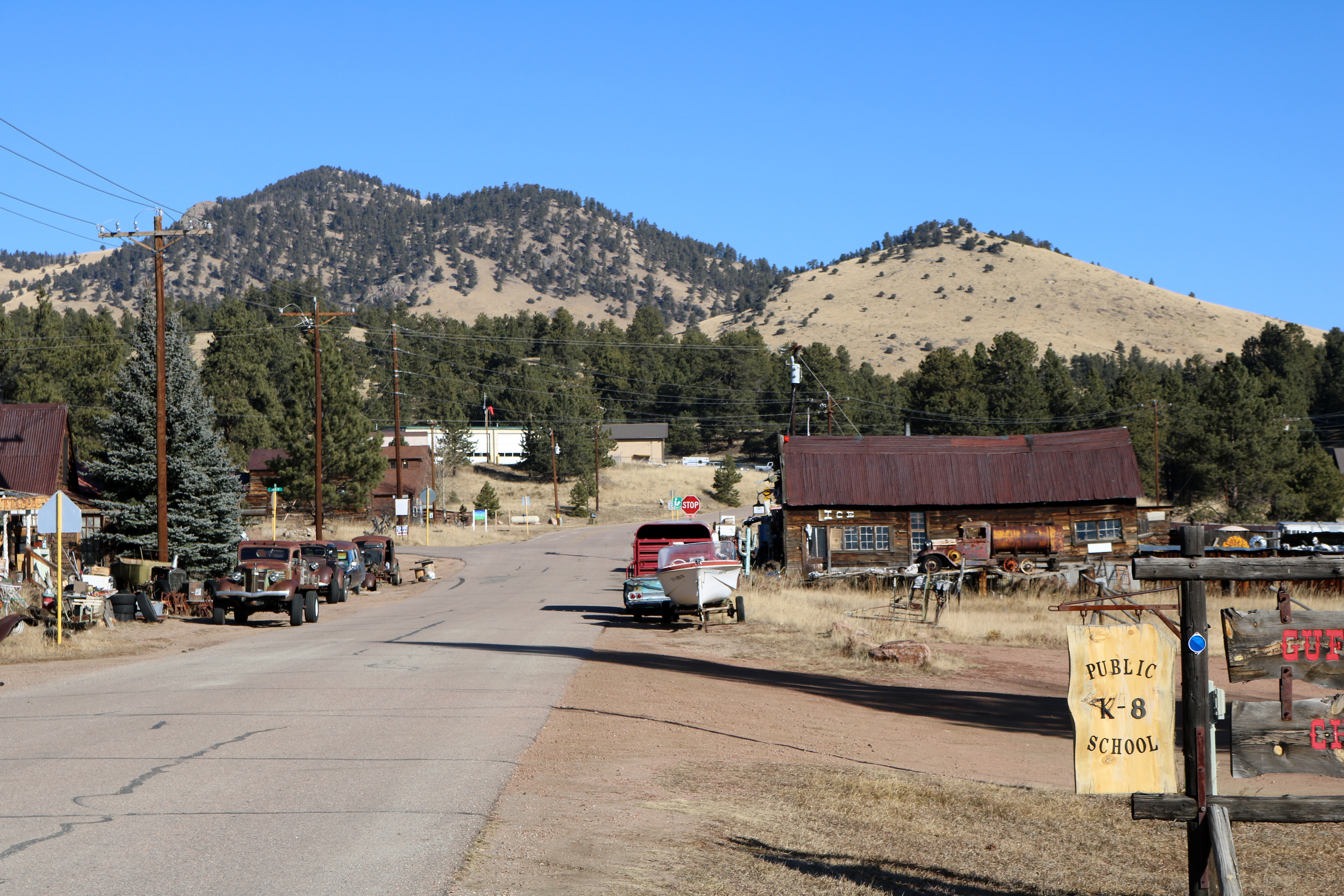
- Main Street in Guffey, November 2017

- Location of the Guffey CDP in Park County, Colorado
- Coordinates: 38°45′33″N 105°30′09″W
- Country: United States
- State: Colorado
- County: Park County

Government
  - Type: Unincorporated area

Area
  - Total: 8.695 sq mi (22.519 km^{2})
  - Land: 8.674 sq mi (22.466 km^{2})
  - Water: 0.020 sq mi (0.053 km^{2})
- Elevation: 8,892 ft (2,710 m)

Population (2020)
  - Total: 111
  - Density: 12.8/sq mi (4.94/km^{2})
- Time zone: UTC-7 (MST)
  - Summer (DST): UTC-6 (MDT)
- ZIP Code: 80820
- Area code: 719
- GNIS feature: 2629988

Guffey is a census-designated place (CDP) and post office in and governed by Park County, Colorado, United States. The Guffey post office has the ZIP Code 80820. At the United States Census 2020, the population of the Guffey CDP was 111. The CDP is a part of the Denver–Aurora–Lakewood, CO Metropolitan Statistical Area.

== History ==
The town was once called Freshwater, and was the center of activity for the Freshwater Mining District, a minor producer of copper, lead, zinc, mica, feldspar, and other minerals, including traces of gold and silver. Activity and population peaked between the years 1895 and 1902, with over 500 residents and 40 businesses in the town. Cattle ranching and lumber operations supplemented the mining activity. The town was also known for its dances and fiddlers.

In January 2001, the bodies of three members of the Dutcher family were found near Guffey; all had been murdered. Three teenagers were convicted of the crime. The boys had formed a group that took on aspects of a paramilitary organization, and one of them claimed that the murders were part of a plan to fight insurrection in the country of Guyana. The brutal nature of the crime and its bizarre motive attracted national attention.

The town has a cat named "Monster" as its unofficial Mayor. The town is perhaps less famous for its annual Fourth of July Chicken Fly, a tradition which lasted for twenty-six years, but ended in 2016. At the chicken-fly, small chickens were released from a velvet-lined mailbox atop a ten-foot-high (3.04 m) platform; prizes were awarded for those chickens that flew the greatest distance.

== Geography ==
Guffey is located about one mile north of State Highway 9 on County Road 102, southeast of South Park. Freshwater Creek flows past the east side of the community.

The Guffey CDP has an area of 5,565 acres (22.519 km^{2}), including 13 acres (0.053 km^{2}) of water.

=== Climate ===
Climate data for Guffey 9SE, Colorado, 1991–2020 normals, 2009-2023 records: 8915ft (2717m)
Month	Jan	Feb	Mar	Apr	May	Jun	Jul	Aug	Sep	Oct	Nov	Dec	Year
Record high °F (°C)	57 (14)	59 (15)	68 (20)	71 (22)	79 (26)	89 (32)	90 (32)	87 (31)	84 (29)	76 (24)	67 (19)	62 (17)	90 (32)
Mean maximum °F (°C)	51.1 (10.6)	51.4 (10.8)	60.1 (15.6)	66.9 (19.4)	73.1 (22.8)	84.2 (29.0)	84.4 (29.1)	80.4 (26.9)	79.8 (26.6)	70.5 (21.4)	60.5 (15.8)	52.6 (11.4)	85.3 (29.6)
Mean daily maximum °F (°C)	36.7 (2.6)	38.1 (3.4)	46.6 (8.1)	52.8 (11.6)	62.8 (17.1)	72.7 (22.6)	77.4 (25.2)	73.6 (23.1)	66.8 (19.3)	58.0 (14.4)	45.2 (7.3)	36.3 (2.4)	55.6 (13.1)
Daily mean °F (°C)	26.5 (−3.1)	27.0 (−2.8)	34.5 (1.4)	40.3 (4.6)	49.3 (9.6)	59.6 (15.3)	63.4 (17.4)	61.4 (16.3)	55.4 (13.0)	45.1 (7.3)	34.5 (1.4)	26.3 (−3.2)	43.6 (6.4)
Mean daily minimum °F (°C)	16.3 (−8.7)	15.8 (−9.0)	22.5 (−5.3)	27.8 (−2.3)	35.9 (2.2)	46.5 (8.1)	49.5 (9.7)	49.1 (9.5)	44.0 (6.7)	32.2 (0.1)	23.8 (−4.6)	16.2 (−8.8)	31.6 (−0.2)
Mean minimum °F (°C)	−3.9 (−19.9)	−7.7 (−22.1)	4.0 (−15.6)	10.4 (−12.0)	21.2 (−6.0)	35.9 (2.2)	43.6 (6.4)	42.4 (5.8)	30.5 (−0.8)	11.7 (−11.3)	4.7 (−15.2)	−5.8 (−21.0)	−11.5 (−24.2)
Record low °F (°C)	−13 (−25)	−23 (−31)	−7 (−22)	0 (−18)	10 (−12)	30 (−1)	41 (5)	39 (4)	20 (−7)	−7 (−22)	−13 (−25)	−17 (−27)	−23 (−31)
Average precipitation inches (mm)	0.56 (14)	0.87 (22)	1.61 (41)	1.75 (44)	2.08 (53)	1.22 (31)	3.49 (89)	3.52 (89)	1.55 (39)	1.09 (28)	0.64 (16)	0.91 (23)	19.29 (489)
Average snowfall inches (cm)	8.40 (21.3)	12.00 (30.5)	10.20 (25.9)	15.80 (40.1)	7.10 (18.0)	0.00 (0.00)	0.00 (0.00)	0.00 (0.00)	1.20 (3.0)	7.50 (19.1)	5.10 (13.0)	10.40 (26.4)	77.7 (197.3)
Average extreme snow depth inches (cm)	5.6 (14)	7.5 (19)	5.9 (15)	4.3 (11)	3.8 (9.7)	0.0 (0.0)	0.0 (0.0)	0.0 (0.0)	0.4 (1.0)	3.6 (9.1)	4.5 (11)	6.1 (15)	10.6 (27)
Average precipitation days (≥ 0.01 in)	4.1	6.0	5.1	6.7	10.9	8.9	17.4	13.7	8.2	4.9	3.4	4.9	94.2
Average snowy days (≥ 0.1 in)	4.1	5.7	4.8	5.3	3.3	0.1	0.0	0.0	0.4	2.5	2.8	4.8	33.8
Source 1: NOAA
Source 2: XMACIS2 (records, monthly max/mins & 2006-2023 snow depth)

== Geology ==
Rocks from two distinct times in Earth's history, the Precambrian and the Paleogene, are exposed in the area. The Precambrian rocks, comprising both igneous intrusive and metamorphic rocks over one billion years old, host mineral deposits of minor economic significance. The relatively much younger Paleogene rocks were erupted by the Guffey volcanic center of the Thirtynine Mile volcanic area about 34 million years ago and are associated with the fossil deposits at Florissant Fossil Beds National Monument.

== Meteorite ==
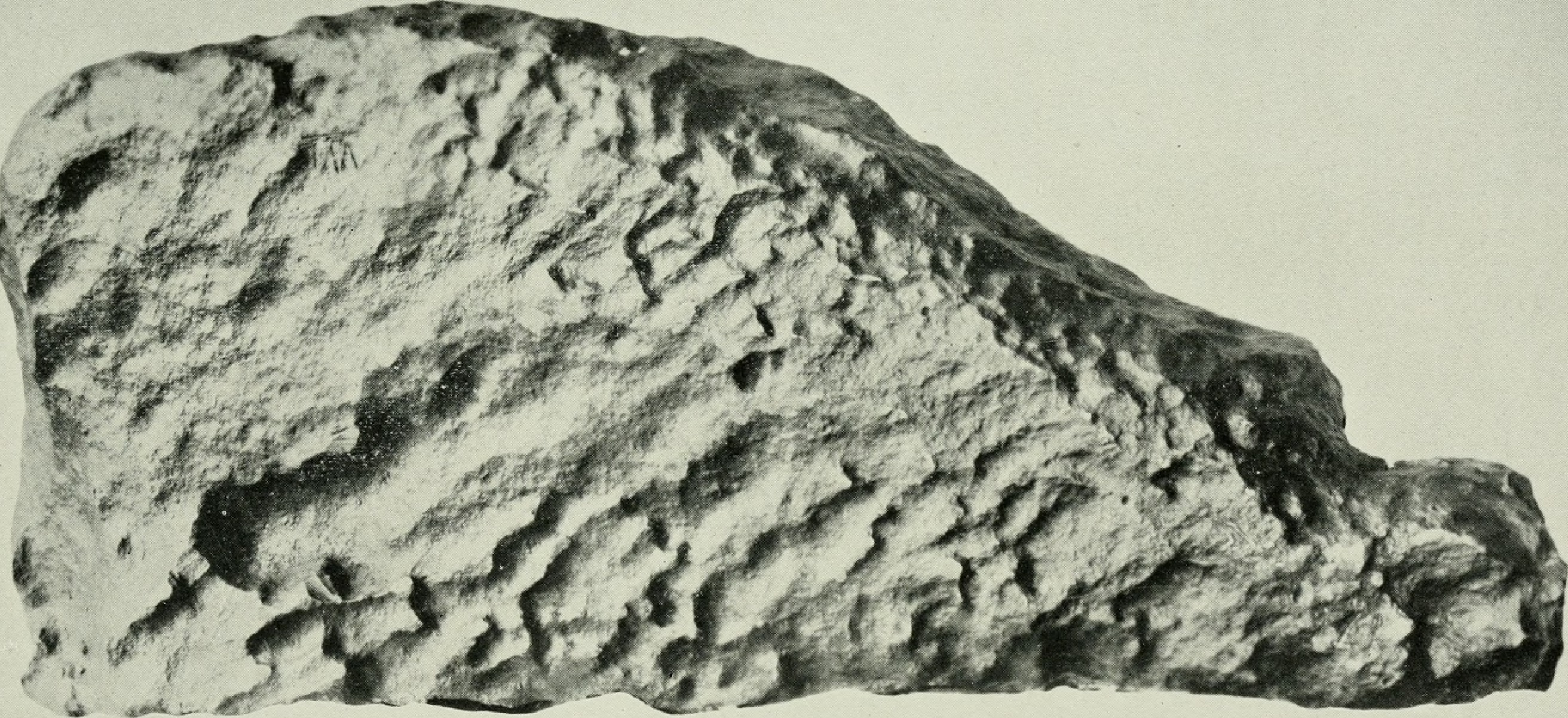
Guffey meteorite, front or brustseite

In 1907, a 309 kilogram (681.2-lb.) meteorite was found near Guffey by two cowboys, although the exact location was not recorded. To date, this is the largest meteorite ever recovered in the state of Colorado. It is classified as an ungrouped iron meteorite, sometimes considered an ataxite due to its high nickel content and lack of Widmanstätten patterns. Most of the meteorite resides in New York City at the American Museum of Natural History, although the Denver Museum of Nature and Science has acquired a slice. No samples are available for public viewing in Guffey itself.

== Demographics ==
Guffey CDP, Colorado
Year	Pop.	±%
2010	98	—
2020	111	+13.3%
Source: United States Census Bureau

The United States Census Bureau initially defined the Guffey CDP for the United States Census 2010.

== See also ==
- Census-designated places in Colorado
