= Thirtynine Mile volcanic area =

Volcanic field in Colorado, United States

Coordinates: 38.8322°N 105.5544°W

The Thirtynine Mile volcanic area, part of the larger Central Colorado volcanic field, is an extinct volcanic area located in Park and Teller counties, Colorado, northwest of Cripple Creek and southeast of South Park. The area was the site of significant volcanism in the Paleogene Period about 35 million years ago. Ashfall and lahars (mudflows) from the volcanoes created the conditions for fossilization at what is now Florissant Fossil Beds National Monument.

The Thirtynine Mile volcanic area is the northern reach of an extensive Eocene to Oligocene volcanic belt. The volcanic fields in this belt include, from north to south, the Thirtynine Mile and San Juan in Colorado, the Mogollon-Datil in New Mexico, the Boot Heel in the bootheel of southwestern New Mexico and adjacent areas of Arizona and Mexico, the Trans-Pecos of west Texas, the Eastern Chihuahua and the vast volcanic field of the Sierra Madre Occidental of western Mexico. These volcanic fields, this volcanic belt, resulted from the subduction of the Farallon plate under the North American Plate.

The area is named for Thirtynine Mile Mountain, a local peak that is composed of volcanic rocks from the field. The area also contains the Guffey volcanic eruption center.
