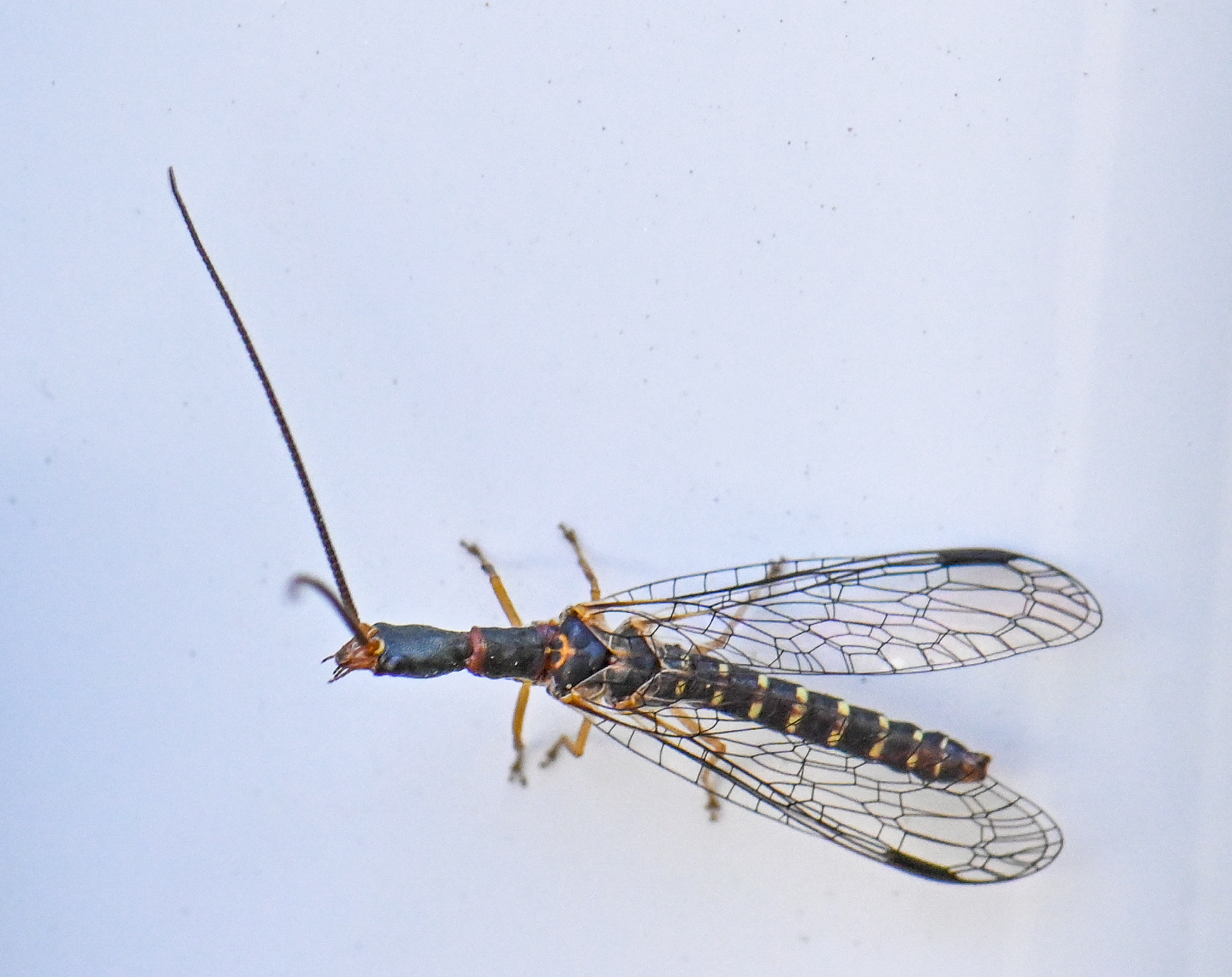
- Negha inflata

Scientific classification
- Domain: Eukaryota
- Kingdom: Animalia
- Phylum: Arthropoda
- Class: Insecta
- Order: Raphidioptera
- Family: Inocelliidae
- Subfamily: Inocelliinae
- Genus: Negha; Navás, 1916

= Negha =

Genus of insects

Negha is a genus of square-headed snakeflies in the family Inocelliidae. There are at least three described species in Negha.

== Species ==
These three species belong to the genus Negha:

- Negha inflata (Hagen, 1861)^{i c g}
- Negha longicornis (Albarda, 1891)^{i c g}
- Negha meridionalis U. Aspöck, 1988^{i c g b}

Data sources: i = ITIS, c = Catalogue of Life, g = GBIF, b = Bugguide.net
