= Wheeler Survey =

United States research expedition

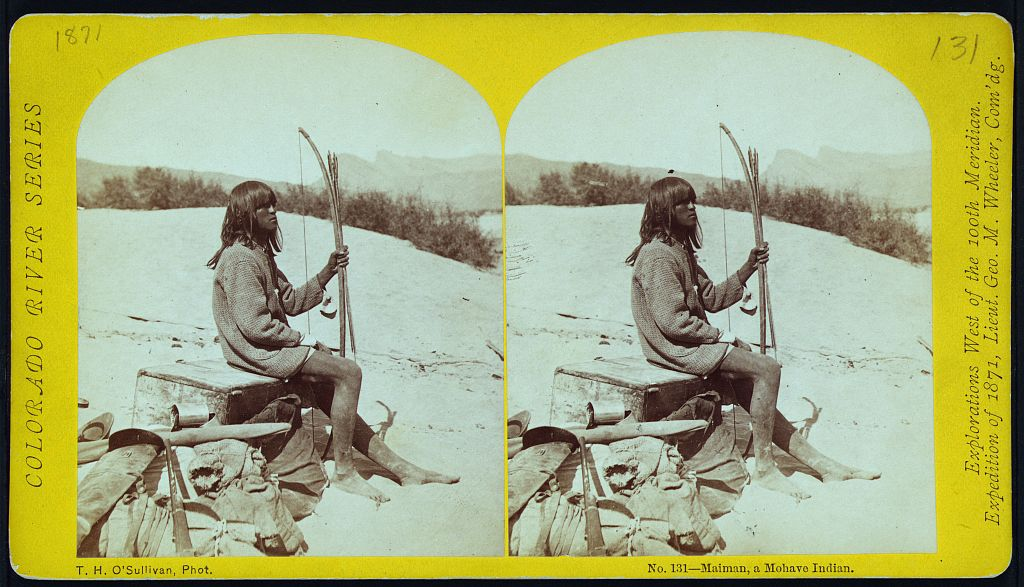
Stereophoto from the 1871 expedition. Photo of Maiman, a Mohave Indian interpreter and guide, by Timothy H. O'Sullivan

The Wheeler Survey, carried out in 1872–1879, was one of the "Four Great Surveys" conducted by the United States government after the Civil War primarily to document the geology and natural resources of the American West. Supervised by First Lieutenant (later Captain) George Montague Wheeler, the Wheeler Survey documented and mapped the United States west of the 100th meridian. The survey team included Lieutenant Montgomery M. Macomb, plus the paleontologists Edward Drinker Cope and Charles Abiathar White as well as the astronomer Miles Rock.

Wheeler led early expeditions from 1869 to 1871 in the West, and in 1872, the United States Congress authorized an ambitious plan to map the portion of the United States west of the 100th meridian at a scale of eight miles to the inch. This plan necessitated what became known as the Wheeler Survey. The survey's main goal was to make topographic maps of the southwestern United States.

In addition he was to ascertain everything related to the physical features of the region; discover the numbers, habits, and disposition of Indians in the section; select sites for future military installations; determine facilities available for making rail or common roads; and note mineral resources, climate, geology, vegetation, water sources, and agricultural potential.

Photographers on the expedition included Timothy H. O'Sullivan of New York and William Bell of Philadelphia. Many of their photographs are now on file at the Library of Congress's Prints and Photographs Division.

The Wheeler Survey lasted until 1879, when the survey, along with the King and Powell Surveys, was terminated and their work was reorganized as the United States Geological Survey.

Wheeler Peak in Nevada (part of the Great Basin National Park), Wheeler Peak in New Mexico (the state high point), and the scenic Wheeler Geologic Area in southern Colorado are named for George Wheeler.
