= Thirtynine Mile Mountain =

Mountain in Colorado, United States

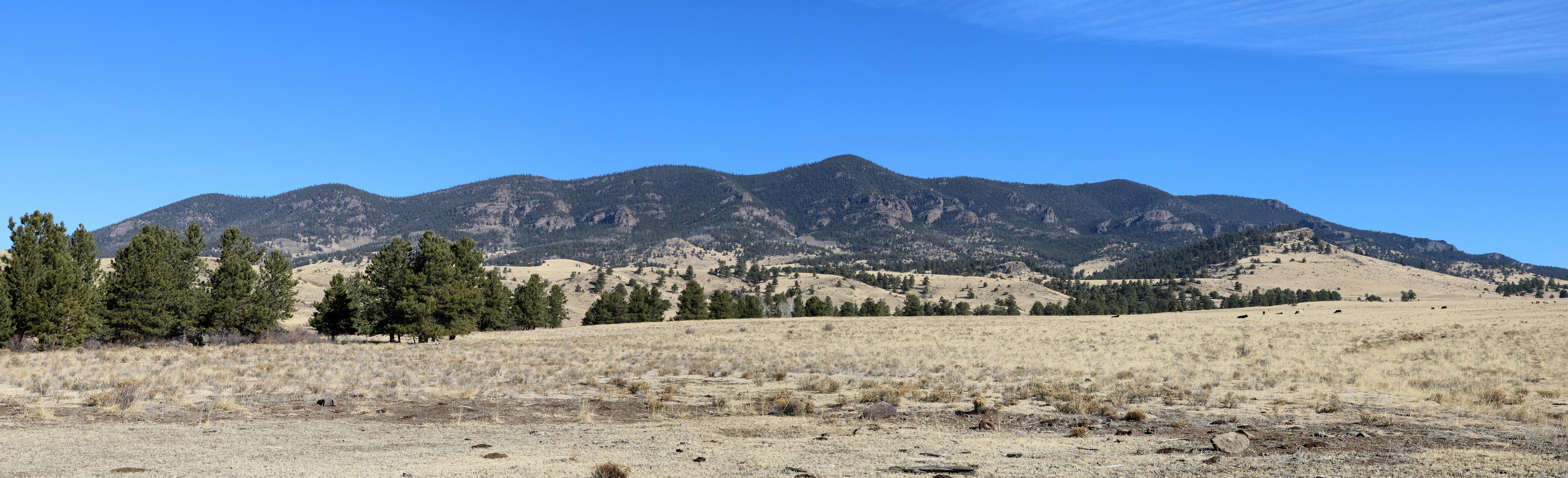

Highest point
- Elevation: 11,553 ft (3,521 m)
- Prominence: 2,088 ft (636 m)
- Isolation: 10.61 mi (17.08 km)
- Listing: Colorado prominent summits
- Coordinates: 38°49′56″N 105°33′18″W

Geography
- Location within Colorado
- Location: Park County, Colorado, U.S.
- Parent range: Front Range, South Park Hills
- Topo map(s): USGS 7.5' map Thirtynine Mile Mountain, Colorado

Geology
- Volcanic field: Central Colorado volcanic field

Thirtynine Mile Mountain, elevation 11,553 ft (3,521 m), is a summit in the Front Range of the Pike National Forest in central Colorado.

== See also ==
- List of Colorado mountain summits
- List of Colorado county high points
