= Vim Wright =

Turkish-American entrepreneur

Violet "Vim" Crane Wright was a Turkish-American entrepreneur, academic, political activist, and environmentalist.

== Early life and education ==
Wright was born June 4, 1926, as Lisetta Iakovidou in Istanbul Turkey. She was adopted by the American couple General John Alden Crane and Mary McKim Crane. They moved to Baltimore, Maryland in 1936. She attended the Garrison Forest School but did not graduate. She married Edward “Skip” Wright Jr. in 1949. She later attended Eaton-Burnett Business College.

Vim and Skip had two sons.

== Career ==
While her husband served in the military Wright volunteered with the American Cancer Society, a local hospital, and the Republican Party.

She moved to Colorado after divorcing her husband. In Colorado she discovered a love for nature eventually becoming the President of the Colorado Open Space Council and even placed herself in the path of bulldozers to prevent the destruction of the Florissant Fossil Beds.

In 1977 Wright moved to Seattle to work at the University of Washington's Institute for Environmental Studies as assistant director. She left the Institute when it was closed in 1992. In Washington she worked with the Farming and Environment Project and founded Washington Conservation Voters.

She served on the Audubon Society's national board.

== Awards and recognition ==
- Feinstone Award for environmental achievement
- Environmental Hero - Washington Environmental Council

== Death and legacy ==
Wright died on June 1, 2003, in Seattle, Washington of lung cancer.

Her papers are held by the University of Washington Libraries.
