= Marysvale volcanic field =

Volcanic field in southwestern Utah, United States

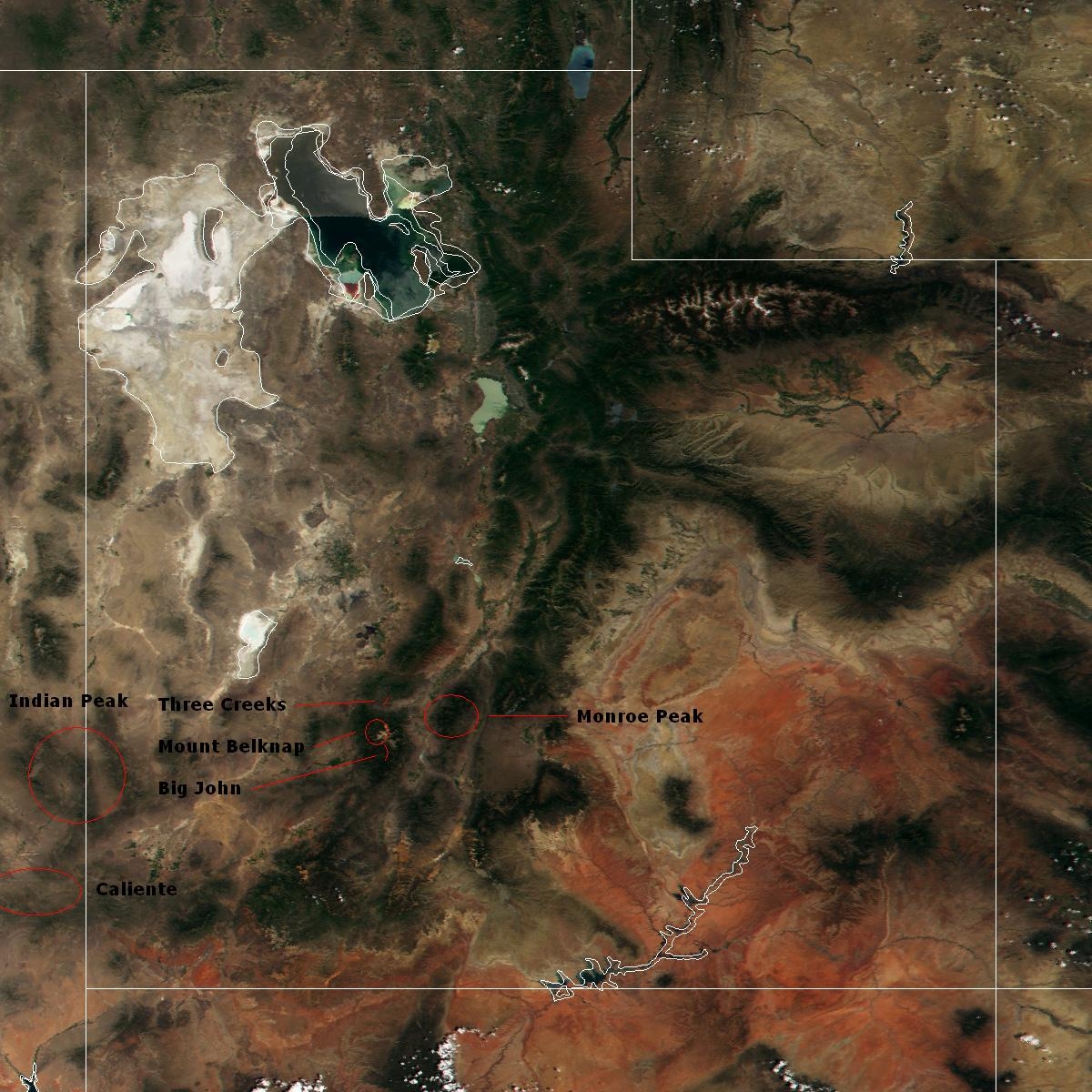
- Indian Peak caldera complex, and Caliente, Three Creeks, Mount Belknap, Big John and Monroe Peak calderas.

Highest point
- Coordinates: 38°30′N 112°30′W

Geography
- Location within Utah
- Location: Utah, United States

Geology
- Rock age: Middle Cenozoic
- Mountain type: Volcanic field

The Marysvale volcanic field is located in southwestern Utah, United States.

One of the largest volcanic fields in the western United States, the Marysvale straddles the Colorado Plateau-Great Basin transition zone. Most igneous rocks belong to a middle Cenozoic (~32 to 22 million years old) calc-alkaline sequence, although about 5% are related to an upper Cenozoic (23 million years to Holocene) bimodal (basalt and rhyolite) sequence. The Marysvale contains a variety of volcanic features, including stratovolcanoes, calderas, lava domes, and cinder cones.

The field is an example of intraplate volcanism; its earlier deposits are thought to be related to Farallon plate subduction, while the later bimodal assemblage (especially the basalts) have been linked to Basin and Range extension.

== Notable calderas ==
Name	Size	Coordinates	Age
Monroe Peak Caldera	20 x 16 km	38°29′00″N 112°03′30″W	23 Ma
Big John Caldera	10 x 6 km	38°19′06″N 112°23′00″W	24 Ma
Mount Belknap Caldera	17 x 13 km	38°26′51″N 112°30′00″W	19 Ma

== See also ==
- Geology of the Bryce Canyon area
- Large volume volcanic eruptions in the Basin and Range Province
- Tushar Mountains, Mount Belknap, Delano Peak
- List of volcanic fields
