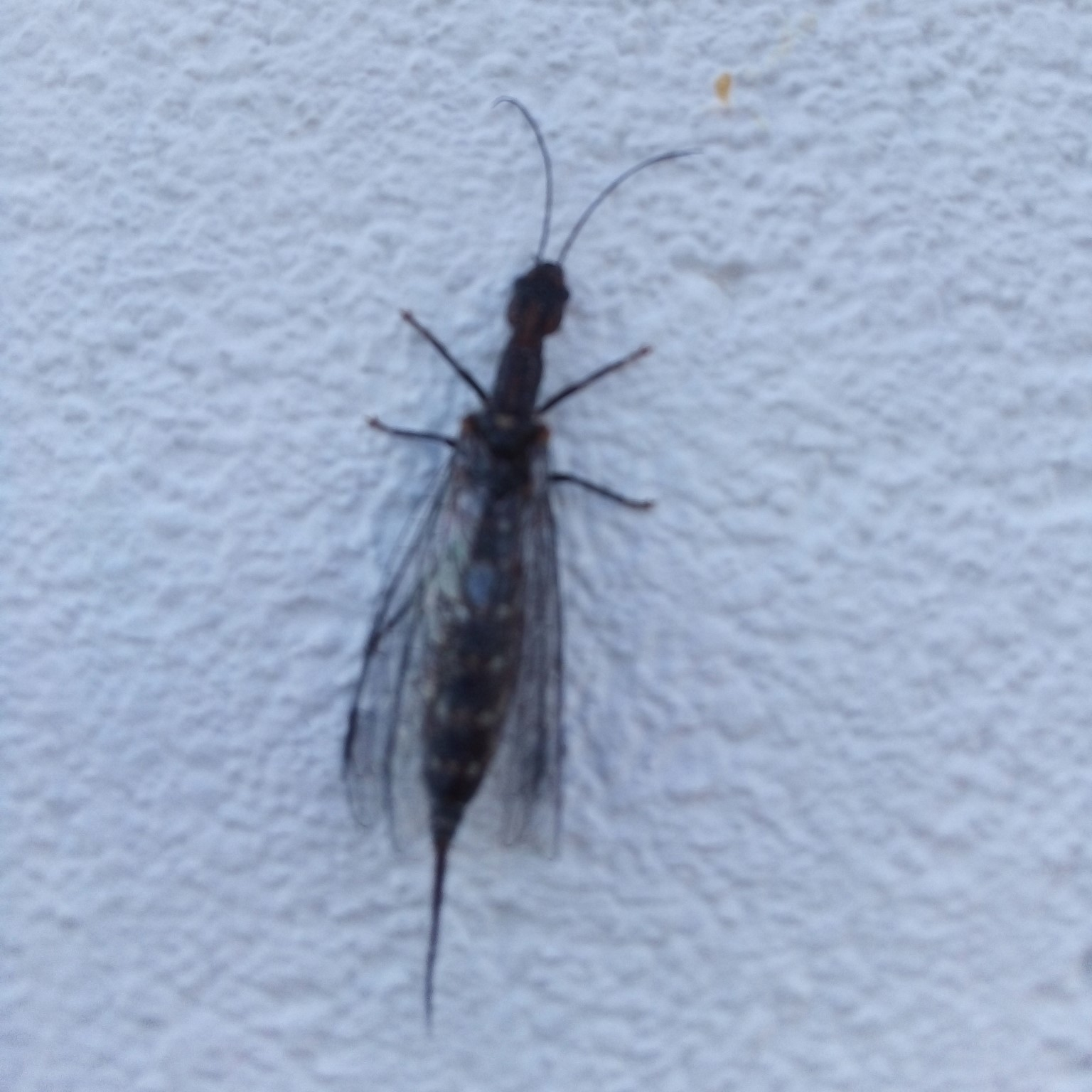
- Fibla hesperica

Scientific classification
- Kingdom: Animalia
- Phylum: Arthropoda
- Clade: Pancrustacea
- Class: Insecta
- Order: Raphidioptera
- Family: Inocelliidae
- Subfamily: Inocelliinae
- Genus: Fibla; Navàs, 1915

= Fibla =

Genus of insects

Fibla is a genus of snakeflies belonging to the family Inocelliidae.

The species of this genus are found in Europe and North America.

== Species ==
GBIF lists:

- †Fibla carpenteri Engel, 1998
- Fibla cerdanica (Nel, 1993)
- Fibla erigena (Menge, 1856)
- Fibla exusta (Cockerell & Custer, 1925)
- Fibla hesperica Navás, 1915
- Fibla maclachlani (Albarda, 1891)
- Fibla pasiphae (H.Aspöck & U.Aspöck, 1971)
- Fibla peyerimhoffi (Navás, 1919)
