= George Wheeler (explorer) =

American explorer and cartographer (1842–1905)

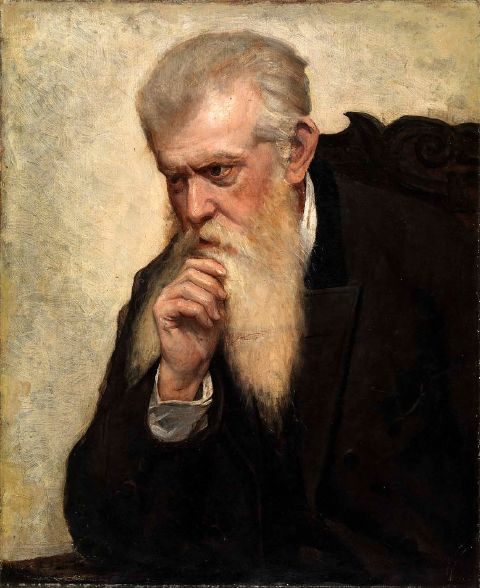
- Portrait by Alice Pike Barney
- Born: George Montague Wheeler; October 9, 1842; Hopkinton, Massachusetts, US
- Died: May 3, 1905 (aged 62); New York City, New York, US
- Education: West Point
- Known for: Exploration of the American West
- Scientific career
- Fields: explorer and cartographer
- Workplaces: United States Geological Survey

George Montague Wheeler (October 9, 1842 – May 3, 1905) was an American pioneering explorer and cartographer and the leader of the Wheeler Survey, one of the major geographical surveys of the western United States in the late 19th century.

Wheeler was born in Hopkinton, Massachusetts, the son of John Wheeler and Miriam P. Daniels. He graduated from West Point in 1866, ranked sixth in his class, and was commissioned as a lieutenant in the US Army Corps of Engineers. He first served in California from 1866 to 1871. In 1869 General Edward O. C. Ord sent him on a reconnaissance mission through eastern Nevada.

In 1872, the US Congress authorized an ambitious plan to map the portion of the United States west of the 100th meridian at a scale of 8 miles to the inch. This plan necessitated what became known as the Wheeler Survey. The project lasted until 1879, when the Wheeler, King, and Powell Surveys were terminated and their combined work was reorganized as the United States Geological Survey.

Wheeler was promoted to captain in 1879. In 1881 he represented the United States at the Third International Geographical Congress and Exhibition in Venice, Italy. He entered semi-retirement in 1883 but continued to write scientific reports until his full retirement from the army in 1888 at the rank of major. He died in New York City in 1905.

Many places are named for George Wheeler, including Wheeler Peak in Nevada (within Great Basin National Park), Wheeler Peak in New Mexico (the state high point), and the scenic Wheeler Geologic Area in southern Colorado.

== Publications ==
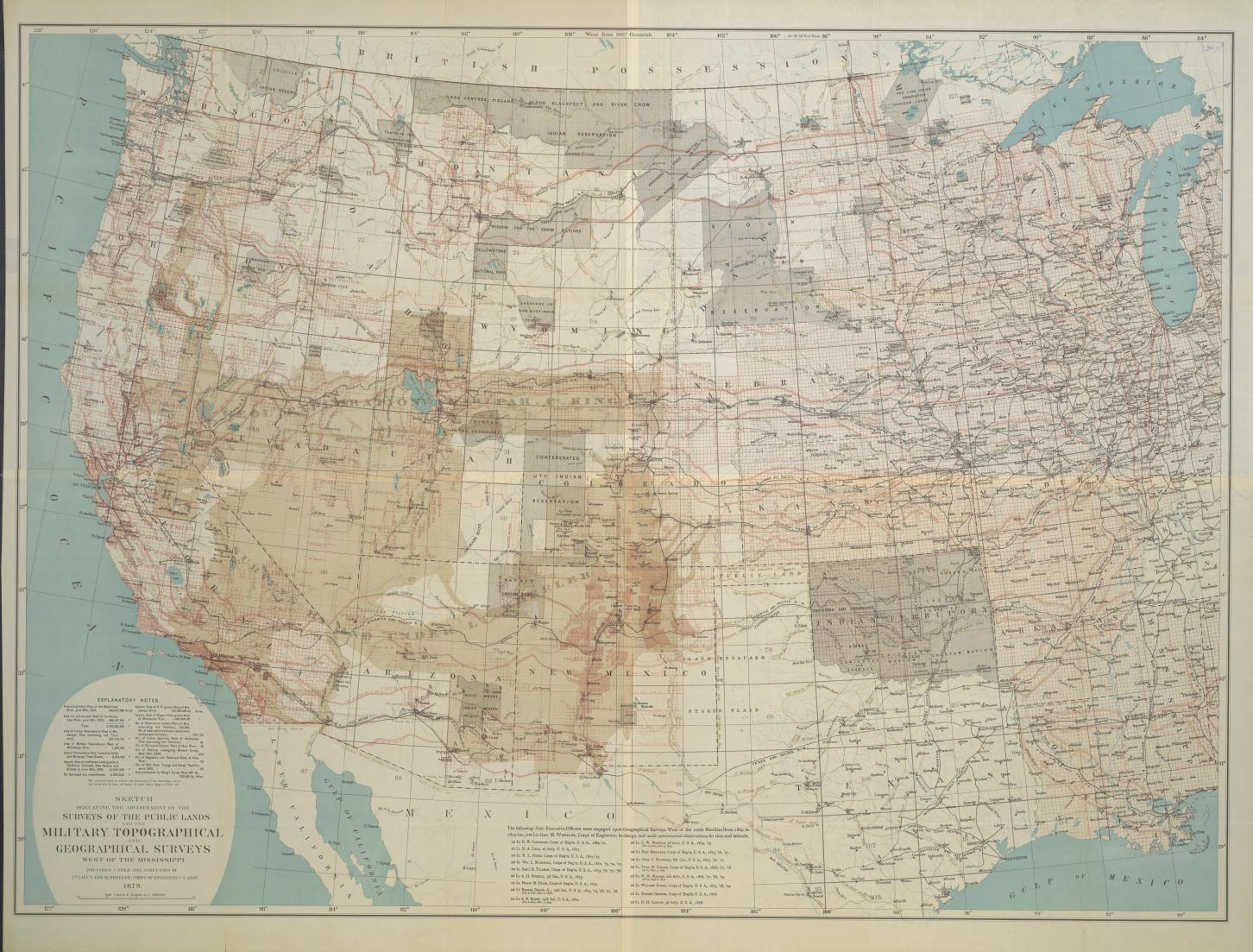
Wheeler's Sketch Indicating the Advancement of the Surveys of Public Lands, 1879

- Preliminary report concerning explorations and surveys, principally in Nevada and Arizona (1872)
- Address of Lieut. Geo. M. Wheeler...before the American Geographical Society (1874)
- Report upon the determination of the astronomical co-ordinates of the primary stations at Cheyenne, Wyoming Territory, and Colorado Springs, Colorado Territory (1874)
- Preliminary report upon a reconnaissance through southern and southeastern Nevada, made in 1869 (1875)
