= Florissant Formation =

National monument in the United States

- Stratigraphic range: Late Eocene, 37.2–33.9 Ma
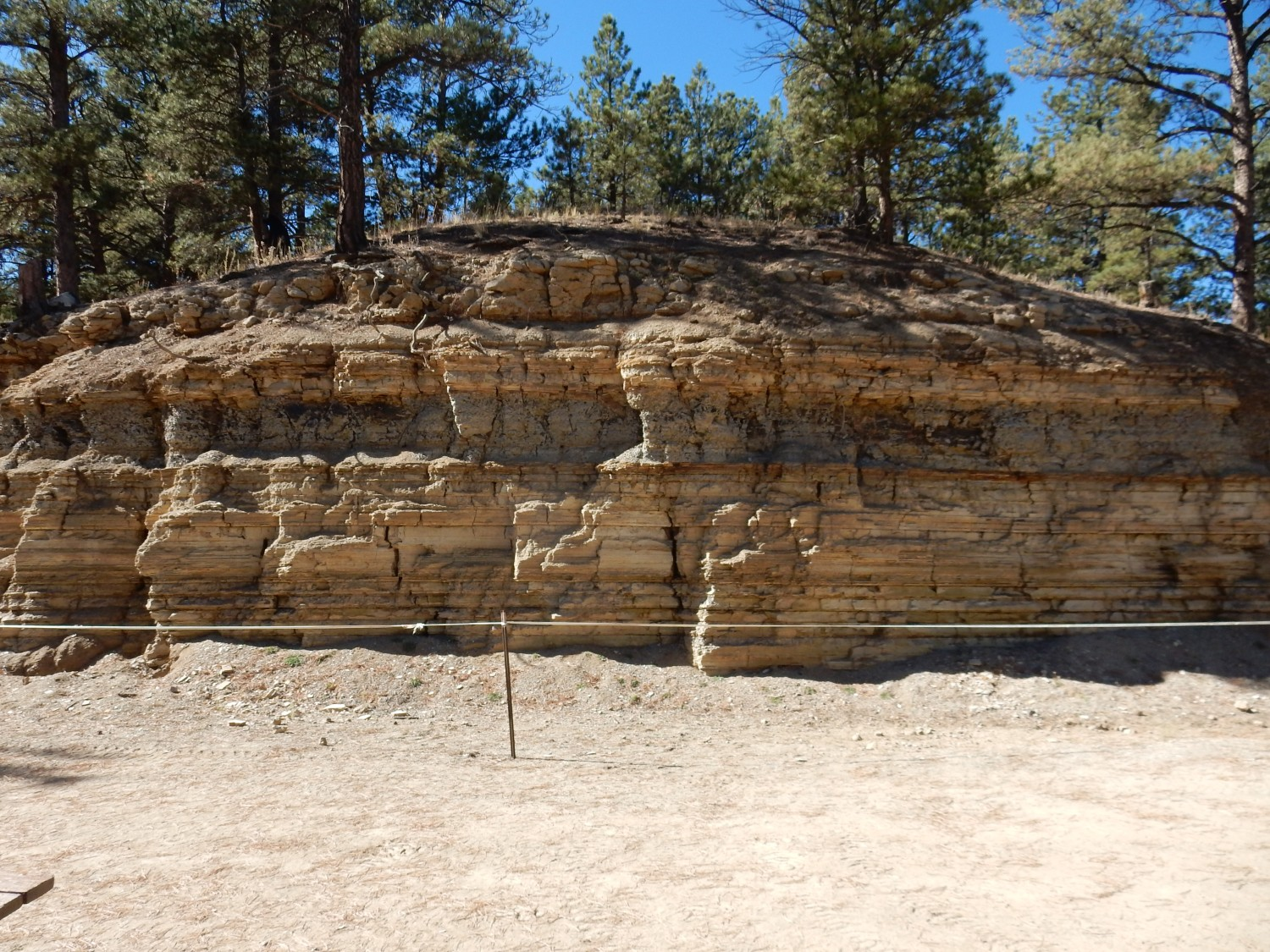
- Florissant Formation at the Clare fossil quarry in Florissant, Colorado
- Type: Formation
- Overlies: Wall Mountain Tuff, Pikes Peak Granite
- Thickness: 74 m (243 ft)

Lithology
- Primary: Shale

Location
- Coordinates: 38.914°N 105.287°W
- Region: Colorado
- Country: United States

Type section
- Named for: Florissant, Colorado
- Named by: Cross
- Year defined: 1894
- Florissant Formation (the United States) Florissant Formation (Colorado)

Florissant Fossil Beds National Monument
- IUCN category V (protected landscape/seascape)
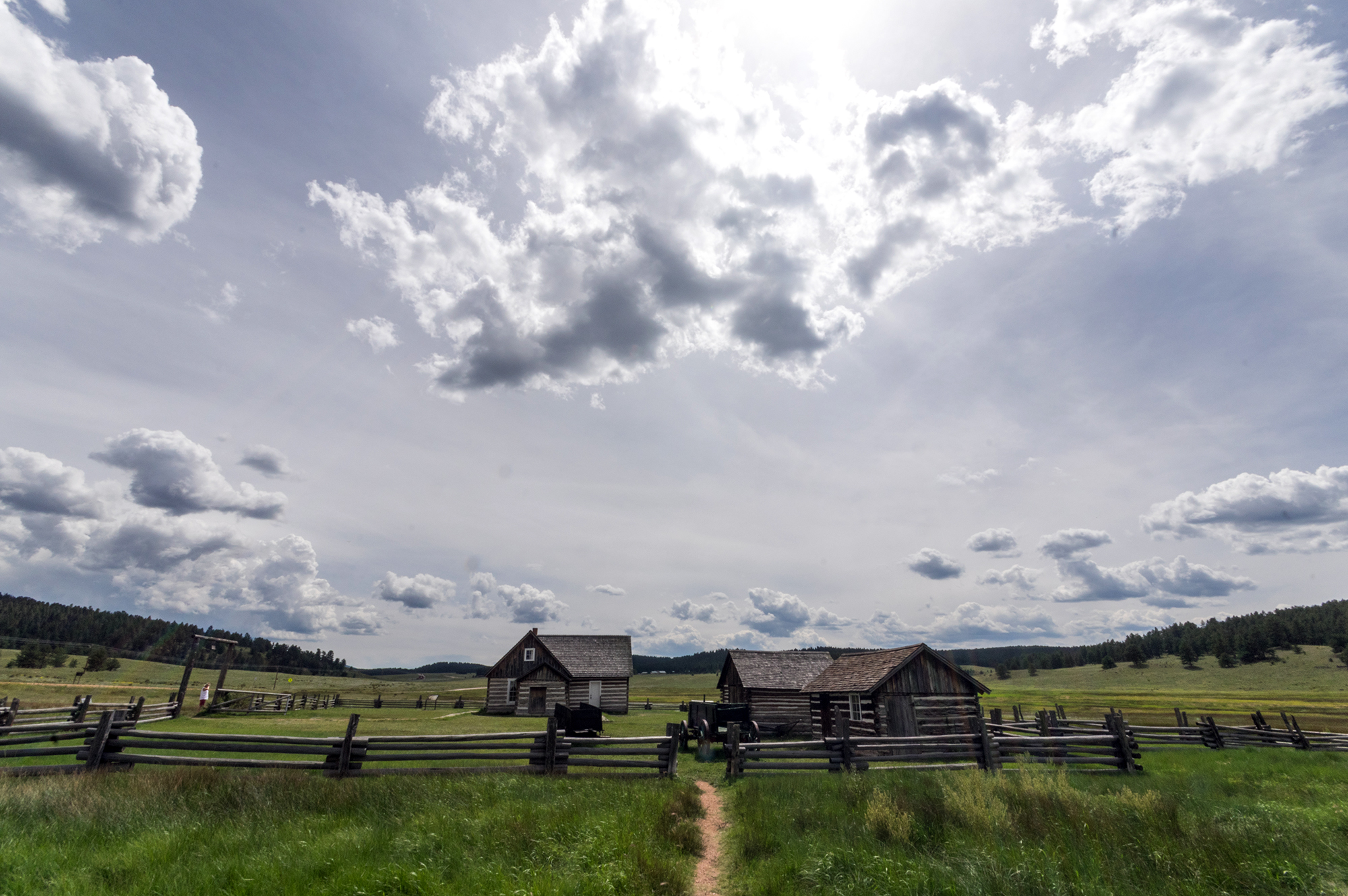
- The Pioneer House, showing how the original pioneers of the west lived

- Location within Colorado Location within the United States
- Location: Teller County, Colorado, United States
- Nearest city: Florissant, Colorado
- Coordinates: 38°54′49″N 105°17′11″W
- Area: 5,998 acres (24.27 km^{2})
- Authorized: August 20, 1969
- Visitors: 63,680 (in 2025)
- Governing body: National Park Service
- Website: Florissant Fossil Beds National Monument

The Florissant Formation is a sedimentary geologic formation outcropping around Florissant, Teller County, Colorado. The formation is noted for the abundant and exceptionally preserved insect and plant fossils that are found in the mudstones and shales. Based on argon radiometric dating, the formation is Eocene (approximately 34 million years old) in age and has been interpreted as a lake environment. The fossils have been preserved because of the interaction of the volcanic ash from the nearby Thirtynine Mile volcanic field with diatoms in the lake, causing a diatom bloom. As the diatoms fell to the bottom of the lake, any plants or animals that had recently died were preserved by the diatom falls. Fine layers of clays and muds interspersed with layers of ash form "paper shales" holding beautifully-preserved fossils. The Florissant Fossil Beds National Monument is a national monument established to preserve and study the geology and history of the area.

== History ==
The name Florissant comes from the French word for flowering. In the late 19th century tourist and excavators came to this location to observe the wildlife and collect samples for collections and study. The Petrified Forest, which is one of the main attractions at the monument today, lost much of its mass due to collectors removing large amounts of petrified wood from the site.

During the 1860s and 1870s the area was mapped by geologists for the first time. Geologists of the Hayden Survey visited the area in the early 1870s, and fossil plants from the beds were described by Leo Lesquereux, fossil insects by Samuel Hubbard Scudder, and vertebrate fossils by Edward Drinker Cope. The formation was first formally named as the Florissant Lake Beds by Charles Whitman Cross in 1894.

In 1969, the Florissant Fossil Bed National Monument was established after a long legal battle between local land owners and the federal government. Today, the park receives approximately 60,000 visitors a year, and is the site of ongoing paleontological investigations. The formation itself was renamed the Florissant Formation in 2001 to conform with the requirements of the North American Commission on Stratigraphic Nomenclature.

== Geology ==
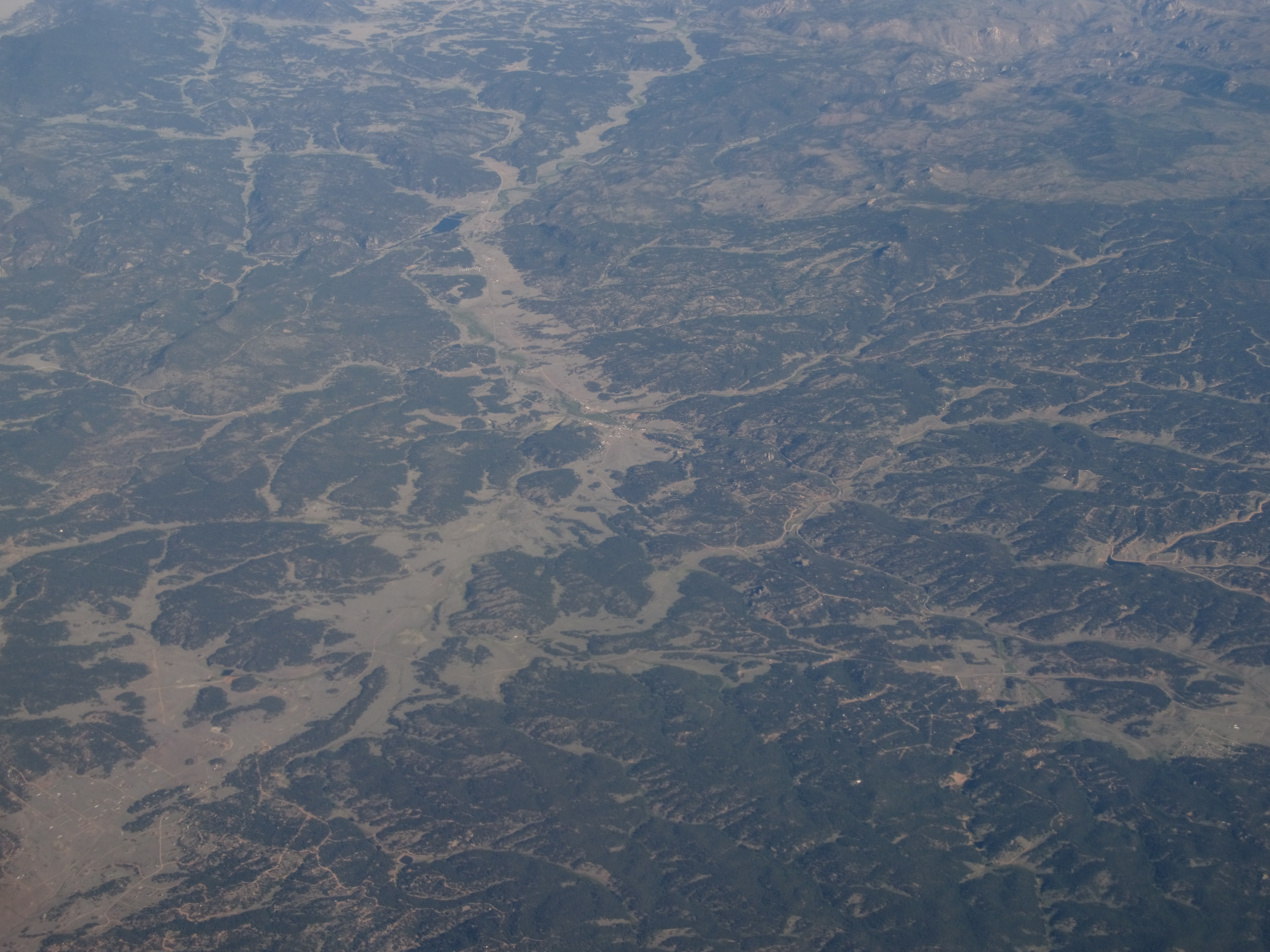
2013 aerial photo

In the late Eocene to early Oligocene, approximately 34 million years ago, the area was a lake environment with redwood trees. The basement is the Proterozoic aged Pikes Peak Granite. There is an unconformity from the Pikes Peak Granite to the next unit, the Wall Mountain tuff. The massive unconformity is due to erosion that occurred during the uplift of the modern Rocky Mountains, the Laramide Orogeny. The Wall Mountain Tuff was deposited as a result of a large eruption from a distant caldera. The Florissant Formation itself is composed of alternating units of shale, mudstone, conglomerate, and volcanic deposits. There are six described units within the Florissant Formation. In order from bottom to top: the lower shale unit, lower mudstone unit, middle shale unit, caprock conglomerate unit, upper shale unit, and the upper pumice unit. Each of the shale units represents lacustrine environments, composed of very thin shales that are abundant in fossils, which alternate with tuffs from eruptions. The lower mudstone has been interpreted as a stream environment with the top of the unit being a lahar deposit. The mudstones were deposited on a valley floor, but not in a lake. The separation of the shale units by non-lake deposits could mean that there were two generations of lake deposits. Lahars that went through the valley could have dammed up the valley, allowing for the creation of a lake. The middle and upper shale units were then deposited in this second generation of the lake. The caprock conglomerate was deposited as a large lahar went through the valley and accumulated down on the lake floor.

The Laramide Orogeny, which created the modern Rocky Mountains, had been uplifting the area to the west since the end of the Cretaceous, although the exact timing of the orogeny is debated In the late Eocene to the Early Oligocene, volcanic episodes began to occur to the southwest of the Florissant area. These episodes of eruption would deposit ash and other volcanic debris on the Florissant location, and the volcanic material would be one of the most important factors in the fossilization of the plants and animals that are so abundant in the formation. The fossil bearing paper shales are intercalated with larger deposits of volcanic material.

Most of the rocks that were deposited after the Oligocene and before the Pleistocene have been eroded away. Most of the remaining units are composed of clasts of weathered Pikes Peak Granite, volcanics, and mud that were transported by streams that flowed through the area. Some mammoth bones have been found within these units and have been dated to around 50,000 years old.

=== Thirtynine Mile Volcanic Field ===
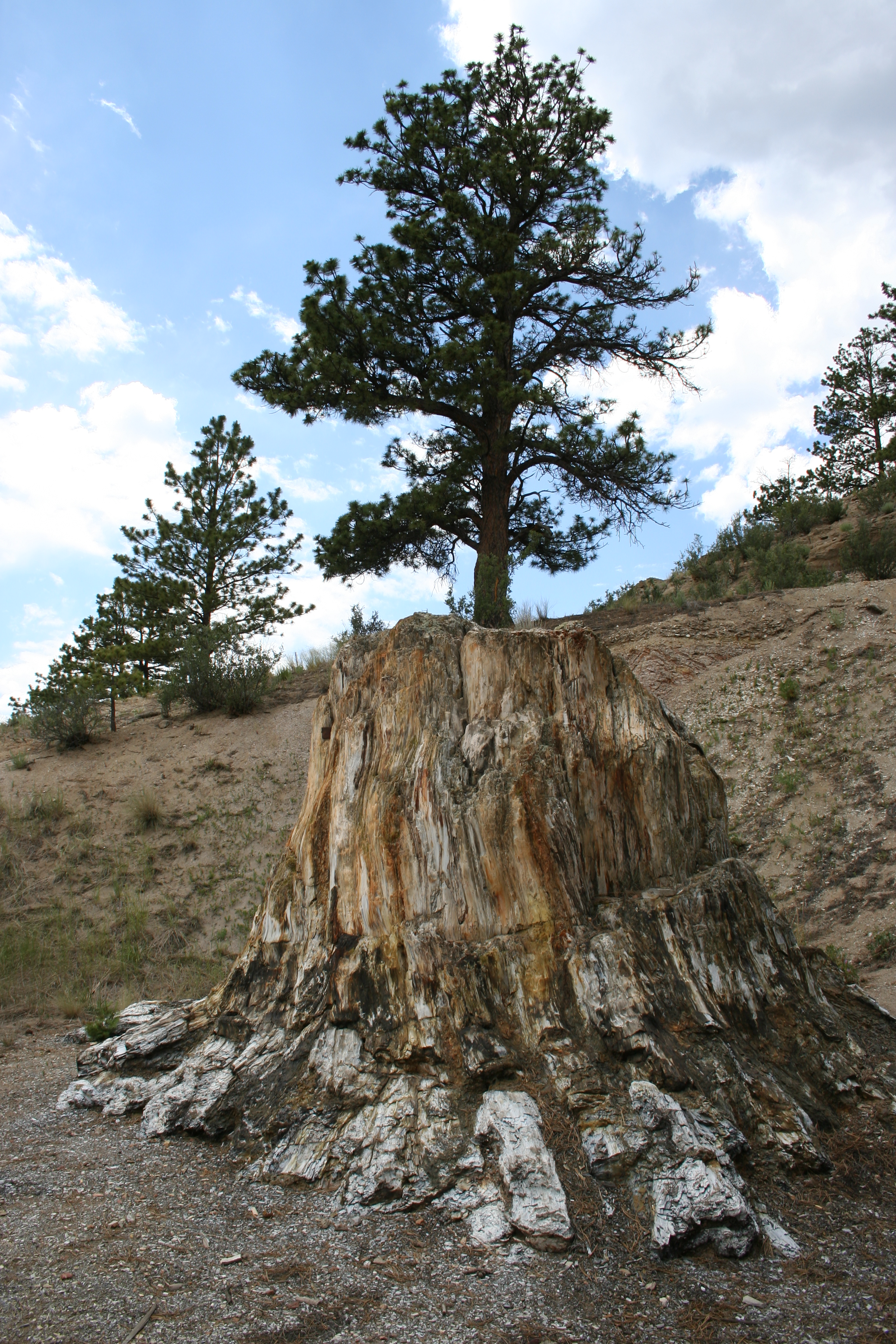
A large petrified stump of Sequoia affinis at Florissant Fossil Beds National Monument

Around 25–30 kilometers to the southwest, a series of stratovolcanoes, similar to modern day volcanoes like Mt. St Helens, developed and erupted periodically. Called the Guffey volcanic center, within the larger Thirtynine Mile volcanic field, the volcano had eruptions that included domes, lava flows, and pyroclastic events. Ash from these events settled throughout the area and lahars flowed down the valleys. The ash that settled created the tuff, and the lahars formed the mudstones and the conglomerates of the Florissant formation.

The Florissant was deposited in a paleovalley after one of the lahars dammed it up. The resulting lake became as large as 36 km^{2}. There were two cycles of lake environments. The first one created the lower shale unit, while the second lake created the middle and upper shale units. Eventually, the volcanoes became dormant and started to erode away. Over time, the volcanoes became so eroded that there are no more obvious signs of them on the surface. Instead, the Eocene erosional surface is the only remnant of the area's volcanoes.

== Fossils ==
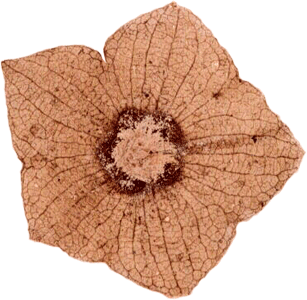
Florissantia speirii flower

The volcanic material that caused so much destruction led to the preservation of the fossils within the Florissant Formation's shales and mudstones. As the ash was deposited on the landscape, it was carried by water through streams and lahars to the lake. The lahars then covered the base of the redwoods that were living at the time, and the trunks of the trees became harder and fossilized. Through permineralization, the precipitates that were in the ground water flowed through the tree trunks, replacing the original matter with siliceous minerals, replacing the organic matter with silica. This process of mineralization led to the preservation of the stumps of the trees.

Within the lake itself, the volcanic deposits were periodically deposited into the lake either through direct deposition or though weathering. The volcanic material was rich in silica. Living in the lake at the time were diatoms, whose shells were also composed of silica. The influx of more silica caused the diatoms to bloom in the lake. As the population of the diatoms massively increased, the stress from the volcanic episodes at the same time caused large die-offs of the local biota. As the plants and animals died off, their leaves and bodies fell into the lake and eventually large amounts of organic matter accumulated at the bottom of the lake. This process was repeated often, possibly yearly, as the runoff from rain collected in the lake, causing cyclical diatom blooms and die-offs. The diatom blooms and die-offs created layers of ash-clay deposits, called couplets, resulting in many thin layers. Each microlayer of ash and clay was compacted by overlaying sediments to create "paper shales" (usually between 0.1 and 1.0 mm thick). Within these paper shales the best preserved fossils can be found in the formation. Based on this information, it has been estimated that the lake could have lasted 2,500 to 5,000 years, if the diatom couplets represent annual cycles.

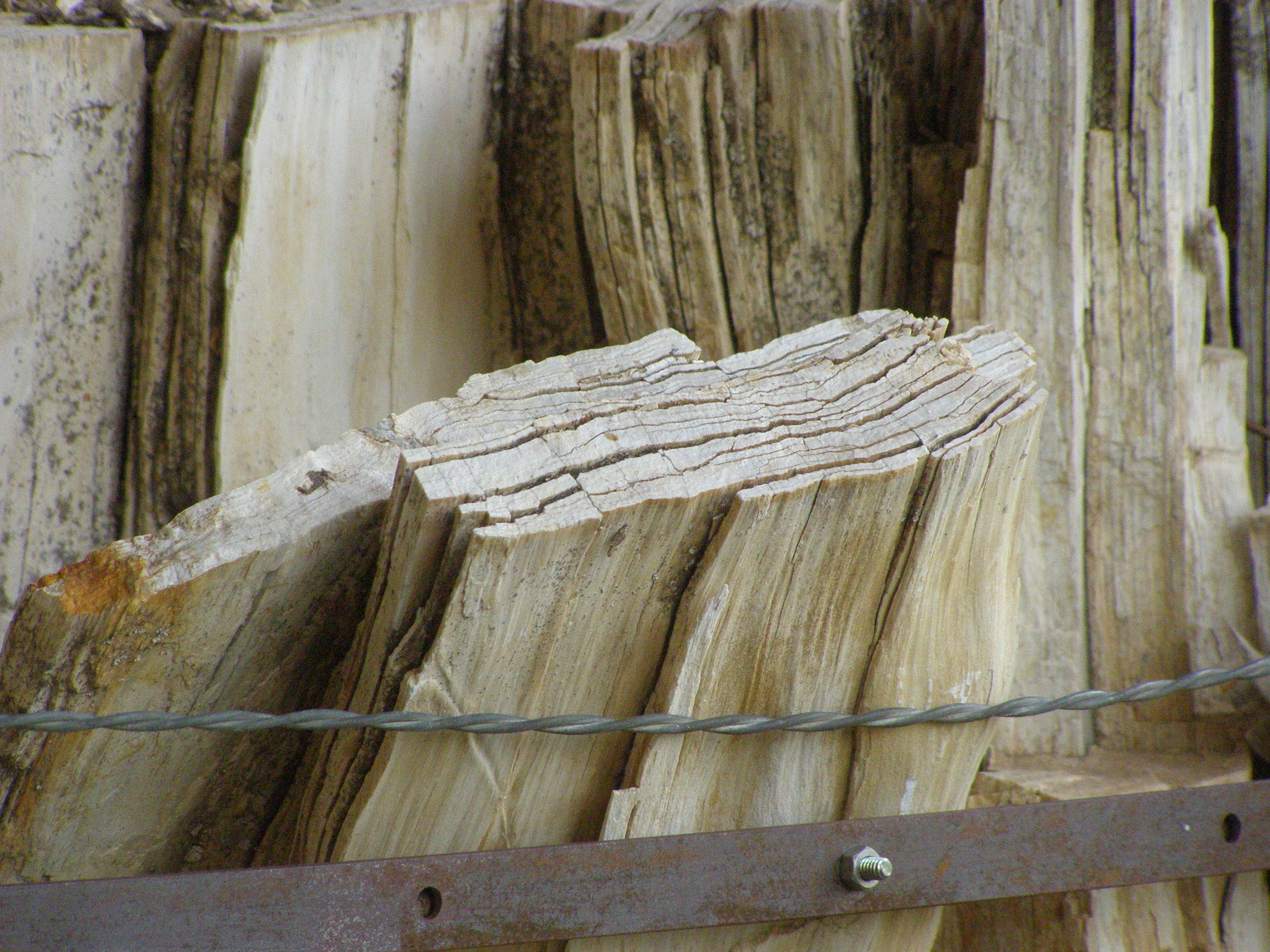
Petrified redwood stump with visible tree rings

=== Paleoflora ===
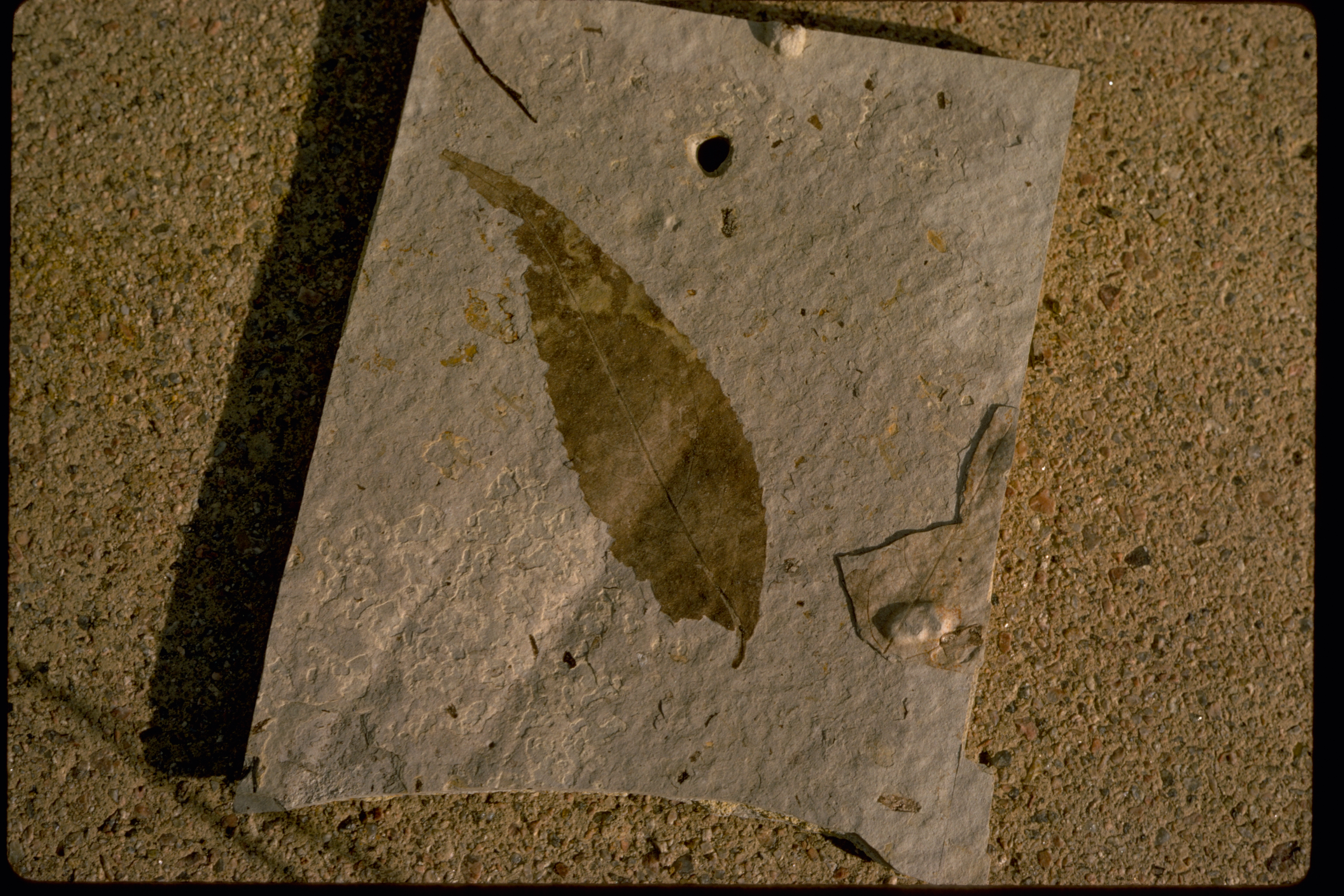
Fossilised leaf preserved in fine detail

There is a large diversity of plants in the beds of the Florissant Formation, ranging from large redwoods to microscopic pollen. The petrified forest is one of the main tourist attractions at the monument with an estimated 30 preserved stumps. They are among the largest petrified stumps in the world. The majority of the stumps have been identified as belonging to Sequoia affinis, a close relative of the modern coast redwood (S. sempervirens). These trees could have been as tall as 60 m (200 ft) until they were killed by lahars suffocating the oxygen supply to their roots. Dendrochronological examination of the tree rings has resulted in estimated ages of 500–700 years old when the trees were killed and buried. Some of the stumps belong to angiosperms.

The Florissant Formation is also known for its fossilized leaves and the impressions they made. There are also specimens of fruits, seeds, cones, and flowers, which are all preserved in the paper shales of the formation. Most of the leaves come from trees and shrubs. Angiosperms are the dominant paleoflora, but there are also conifers present.

Some of the cones, foliage, and pollen have been identified as coming from the sequoias. There are distinct differences in the fossilized Sequoia affinis material to the modern redwoods of California. The foliage in the fossils is thinner and the female cones are smaller than the modern examples. There have been more than 130 species of pollen that have been identified in the shale beds at Florissant. These species represent samples from many different habitats that were located near and around the lake, as well as farther up the valley.

Benthic diatoms are the dominant type of siliceous algae found in the beds. These are easy to fossilize due to their silica shells. During periods of volcanism, the influxes of silica from volcanic ash lead to blooms of algae, which lead to algal mats and the exceptional preservation of the fossils. Florissant is significant in that it is one of the earliest known examples of freshwater diatoms.

=== Fauna ===
The majority of the animal fossils found at Florissant are invertebrates, but many specimens of vertebrates have been found. With such a large number of species identified in this location, it becomes apparent that the environment was ideal for a large range of animals to survive in the area. The great preservation of these animals gives insight into the environment that they survived in, as well as some aspects of their behavior.

==== Invertebrates ====
The invertebrate fossils of the Florissant are arthropods, such as spiders, millipedes, insects, and ostracods; and mollusks such as clams and snails. Of these, the most significant seem to be the spiders and insects, of which over 1,500 species have been identified in the fossil beds.

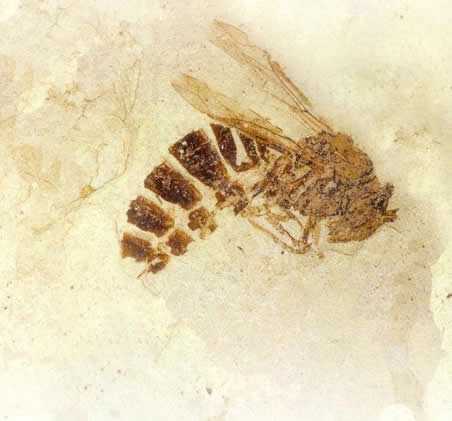
Palaeovespa florissantia, a fossil wasp, forms the logo for Florissant Fossil Beds National Monument

Arachnids are well represented in the Florissant, mostly a large variety of spiders. There have also been possible examples of harvestmen and daddy long-legs. There may be some evidence for gall mites, but no fully identified body fossils of them have been discovered yet. One unusual aspect of the spiders found in the formation is that they are not found with their legs curled in, but instead they are fully extended. This could indicate that they died in warmer temperature or acidic waters. The insects that are found in the ash-clay beds are diverse and numerous. Mayflies, dragonflies, damselflies, grasshoppers, crickets, katydids, cockroaches, termites, earwigs, web-spinners, cicadas, snake flies, lacewings, beetles, flies, mosquitoes, butterflies, moths, wasps, bees, ants, and other insects have all been found in the Florissant. Of these, the beetles are the most diverse and dominate in number of specimens found as fossils. About 38% of the specimens found in the fossil beds are varieties of beetle. These fossils are aquatic and terrestrial insects, giving insight into the ecology and biology of the area.

Ostracods are believed to have fed on algae on the bottom of the lake. Most of the fossil examples of ostracod come from the preserved carapaces, or feeding appendages. Only one species of ostracods has been described so far. Several freshwater mollusks have been identified, including freshwater and terrestrial. The most abundant mollusk that has been identified at Florissant is gastropods (snails).

==== Vertebrates ====
The vertebrate fossils in the Florissant are predominantly small fragments of incomplete bones. There have been a few described species of vertebrates, mostly fish, but also birds and mammals. The fish discovered at the site include bowfins, suckers, catfishes, and pirate perches. Most of these were bottom dwellers, except the perches, and many were tolerant of poor water conditions. Most of the fish have been found in the same shale layers versus other shale layers. This could indicate that there were more tolerable times for fish populations over the history of the lake than other times.

Three examples of birds have been found in the beds, including a cuckoo. Most of the skeleton was lost, but there were still enough diagnostic features to identify the bird. There are also examples of rollers and shorebirds. Other birds were described in early literature from the 19th century, but the exact identification of these samples cannot be done due to lack of information.

Mammals are almost non-existent in the shales, with only one specimen of a small opossum being discovered so far. In the lower mudstone units, there are samples of broken bones of a horse, a brontothere, and an oreodont. The horse would have been small, about as large as a medium-sized dog, with three toes on each foot. All this information is based on a complete lower jaw. The largest mammal that has been discovered so far is a brontothere, an elephant-sized animal with a pair of thick horns on the top of its head. All of this information is based on fragmented vertebrae and small pieces of tooth enamel. The oreodont, is an extinct family that resembles modern sheep and pigs. The only oreodont specimen is a jaw fragment. Other mammals have been described in the formation based on teeth specimens. In all, around a dozen mammalian taxa have been discovered and described in the Florissant.

Surprisingly, no reptiles or amphibians have been recorded from Florissant, where they would have been expected. No explanation for the lack has been proposed, given the nearly 40,000 specimens from this location held by museums. The toxicity of the water due to volcanic activity could be to blame, but there are documented cases of aquatic animals in the lake.

== Paleoclimate ==
Fossil plants, and in particular their leaves, have been the most useful sources of information of paleoclimate during the time of deposition of the Florissant Formation. Plants have a smaller tolerance on average to climatic changes, whereas many animals can be mobile and respond to rapid seasonal or daily changes.

Comparing fossil plants and leaves to modern analogs enables inferences about the climate to be made based on physiological and morphological similarities. One of the best ways to do this is by studying the characteristics of the leaves that have been found. By looking at the physiognomy, or analysis of gross appearance based on climatic factors, the mean average temperature (or MAT) has been estimated to be around 13 °C, much warmer than the modern MAT at Florissant of 4 °C. There have also been estimates that the MAT was between 16 and 18 °C, based on comparisons to the closest living relatives of the plants. There are also indications that the seasonal changes in the area were not as great as what is seen in modern times. Estimates of MAT, based on pollen, have put the temperature as high as 17.5 °C, but pollen is arguably less diagnostic than leaves. .

Based on the small size and the features of the teeth, the precipitation during the late Eocene to early Oligocene has been estimated to be around 50-80 centimeters per year, with a distinct dry season. This is much wetter than the average 38 cm that falls in the area during modern times. Most of the precipitation would have come in the late spring to early summer, with the rare snowfall in the winter.

Tree-ring analysis indicates that the environment that the redwoods grew in during the time of sediment deposition would have been even more favorable than the current climate that the redwoods in California grow in. The average ring width, one year of growth, is larger than the width of redwoods in central California. Towards the end of the Eocene, the global temperature began to decrease. However, this episode of global cooling is not indicated in the fossil record at Florissant.

=== Paleohabitats ===
The fossilized algae and aquatic angiosperms indicate that the lake was freshwater and shallow. Near the streams and shore, moisture was plentiful, allowing lush vegetation to grow. However, further up the hillsides was more dry-adapted vegetation. At the base of the valley, trees (such as sequoias) dominated the landscape. The understory of this forest would have been composed of smaller trees and shrubs. There would have been a gradual transition between the different habitats from the base of the valley up the hillsides, with some overlap between the two.

Insects from the area indicate different habitats as well. There are exclusively aquatic insects, such as dragonflies, that would have lived their entire lives on or near the lake. Meanwhile, the bees and butterflies would have preferred more open spaces in the surrounding hillsides and meadows.

=== Paleoaltitude ===
Early estimates of the elevation of the Florissant beds was determined to be between 300 and 900 meters, much lower than the modern elevation of 2,500-2,600 meters. However, more recent estimates that are based on paleoflora have put the elevation in the Eocene much higher. Ranges from 1,900 to 4,100 meters have been proposed. This would indicate that global climate change, rather than tectonic uplift, would be the main cause of changing environments in the area. The actual elevation of the Florissant area during the Eocene is still being determined. While most of the analysis using paleoflora has the area at a higher elevation than modern times, there is evidence that the elevation was as low as the earlier estimates.

== See also ==
- Cherokee Ranch petrified forest, a largely untouched petrified forest in Colorado
- Green River Formation, a similarly fossiliferous, but older freshwater Eocene formation in the Colorado Rocky Mountains.
- Vim Wright
- List of national monuments of the United States
