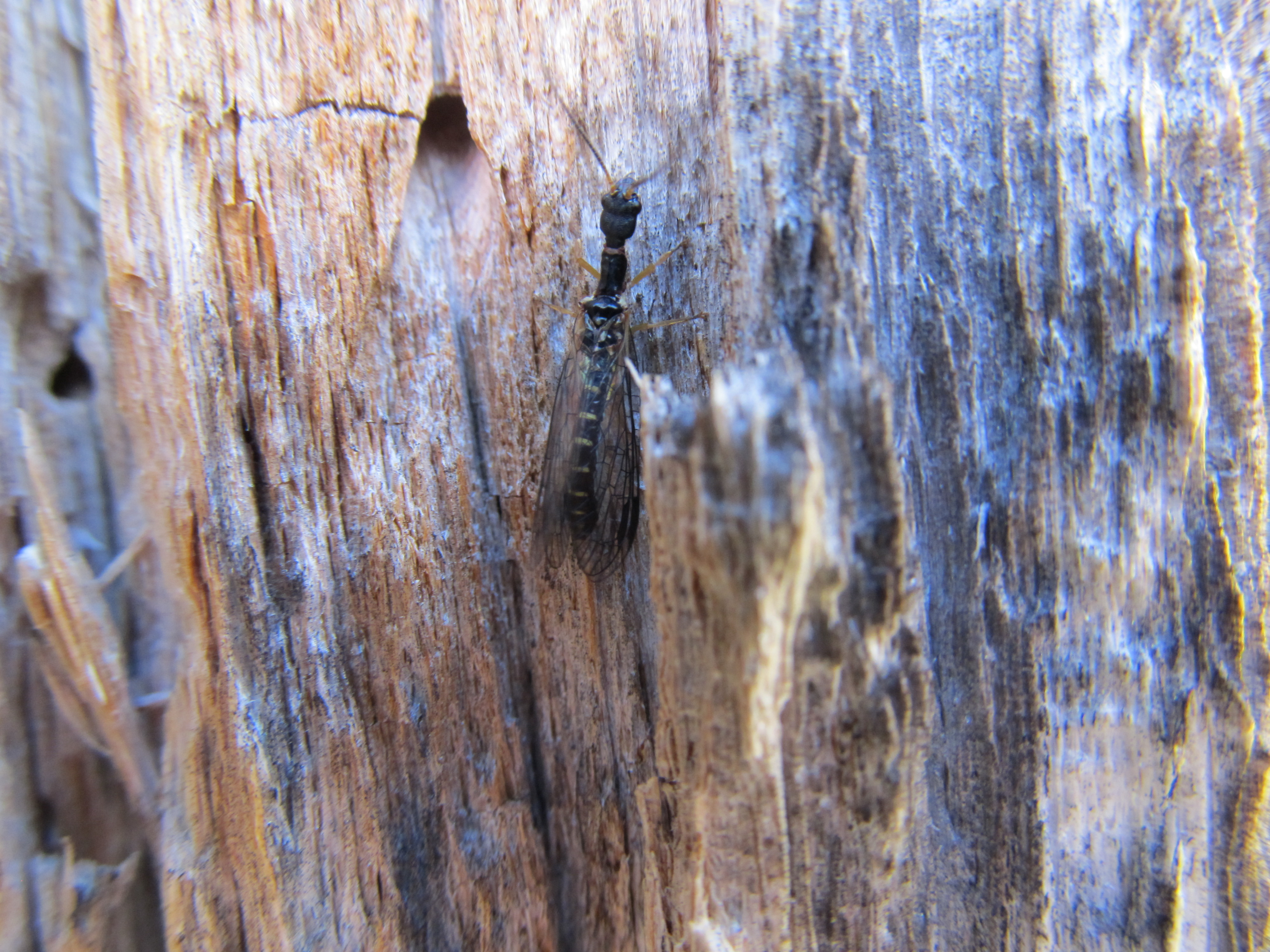
- Inocellia crassicornis

Scientific classification
- Domain: Eukaryota
- Kingdom: Animalia
- Phylum: Arthropoda
- Class: Insecta
- Order: Raphidioptera
- Family: Inocelliidae
- Subfamily: Inocelliinae
- Genus: Inocellia; Schneider, 1843

= Inocellia =

Genus of snakeflies

Inocellia is the Palaearctic type genus of the family Inocelliidae: belonging to the snakeflies and their allies. Distribution records are from mainland Europe and Asia: especially in the more temperate zones.

== Species ==
The following are included in BioLib.cz:

1. Inocellia aspouckorum C.-k. Yang, 1999
2. Inocellia bhutana H. Aspöck et al., 1991
3. Inocellia bilobata U.Aspöck et al., 2011
4. Inocellia biprocessus Liu et al., 2010
5. Inocellia brunni Navás, 1915
6. Inocellia cheni Liu et al., 2010
7. Inocellia cornuta U.Aspöck et al., 2011
8. Inocellia crassicornis (Schummel, 1832)
9. Inocellia digitiformis Liu et al., 2010
10. Inocellia elegans Liu et al., 2009
11. Inocellia frigida Navás, 1915
12. Inocellia fujiana C.-k. Yang, 1999
13. Inocellia fulvostigmata U. Aspöck & H. Aspöck, 1968
14. Inocellia hainanica Liu et al., 2013
15. Inocellia hamata Liu et al., 2010
16. Inocellia indica Liu & Hajong, 2015
17. Inocellia japonica Okamoto, 1917
18. Inocellia longispina U.Aspöck et al., 2011
19. Inocellia nigra Liu et al., 2012
20. Inocellia obtusangularis Liu et al., 2010
21. Inocellia rara Liu, Aspöck & Aspöck, 2014
22. Inocellia rossica Navás, 1916
23. Inocellia shinohara U.Aspöck et al., 2009
24. Inocellia sinensis Navás, 1936
25. Inocellia striata U.Aspöck et al., 2011
26. Inocellia taiwana H. Aspöck & U. Aspöck, 1985
27. Inocellia yunnanica Liu et al., 2012
