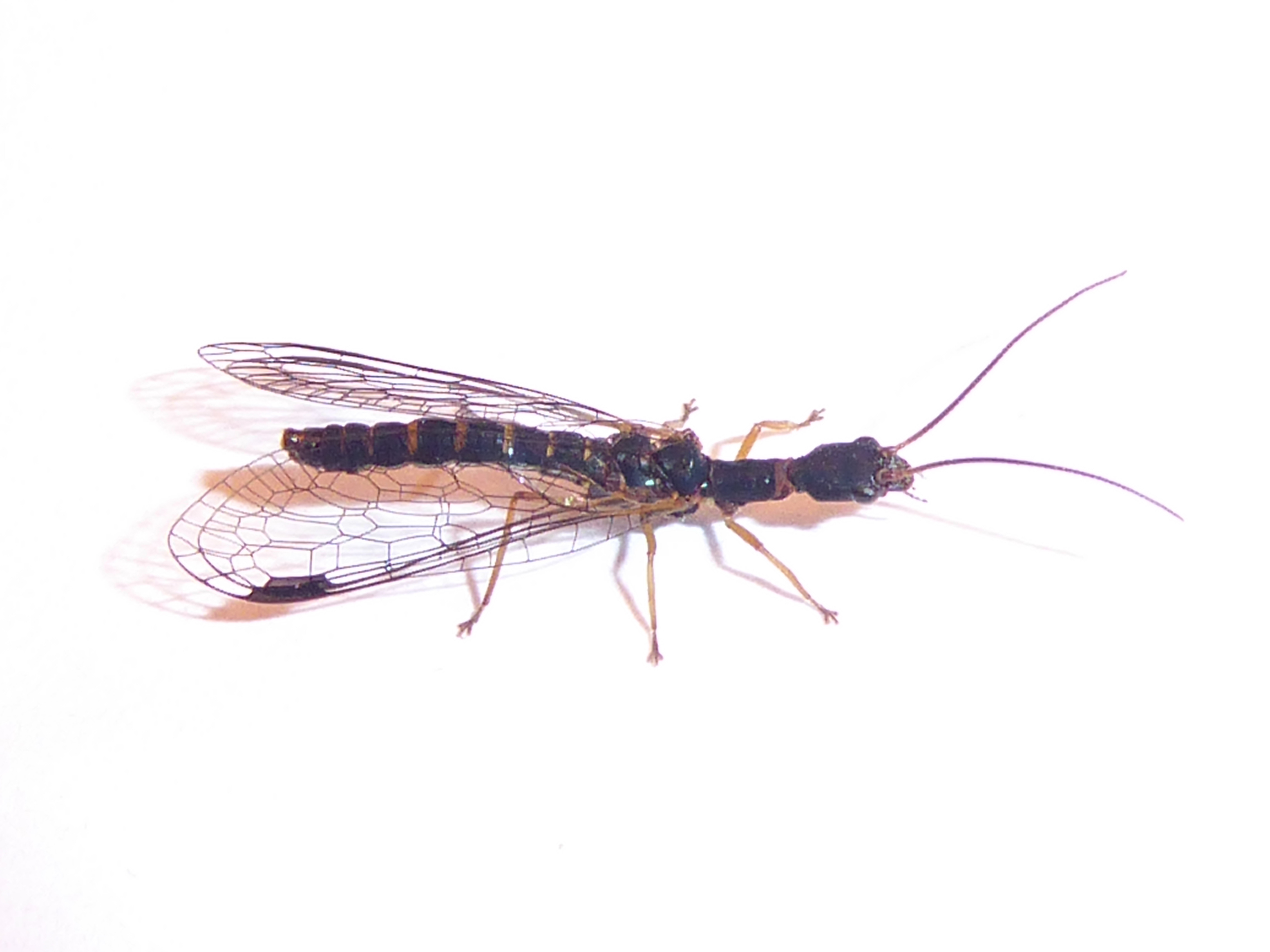
- Inocelliidae sp., possibly Parainocellia bicolor, photographed in Segonzano (Italy)

Scientific classification
- Kingdom: Animalia
- Phylum: Arthropoda
- Clade: Pancrustacea
- Class: Insecta
- Order: Raphidioptera
- Suborder: Raphidiomorpha
- Family: Inocelliidae; Navás

Subfamilies
- See text

= Inocelliidae =

Inocelliidae Temporal range: Eocene–recent

Family of insects

Inocelliidae is a small family of snakeflies containing 8 genera of which one is known only from fossils. They are commonly known as inocelliid snakeflies. The largest known species is Fibla carpenteri known from fossils found in baltic amber.

== Subfamilies and Genera ==
The following genera are included in BioLib.cz:

=== Inocelliinae ===
Authority: Engel, 1995

1. Amurinocellia Aspöck & Aspöck, 1973 (Recent)
2. Fibla Navás, 1915 (Eocene-Recent; Fossils: Baltic amber, Spain, USA)
3. Indianoinocellia Aspöck & Aspöck, 1970
4. Inocellia Schneider, 1843
5. Negha Navas, 1916
6. Parainocellia H. Aspöck & U. Aspöck, 1968
7. †Paraksenocellia Makarkin, Archibald, & Jepson, 2019
8. Sininocellia Yang, 1985

=== Fossil taxa ===
Includes subfamily †Electrinocelliinae Engel, 1995

1. †Electrinocellia Engel, 1995 (Eocene; Baltic amber)
2. †Succinofibla Aspöck and Aspöck, 2004
