= Wheeler Geologic Area =

Volcanic geologic feature in Colorado, United States

Coordinates: 37.884°N 106.784°W

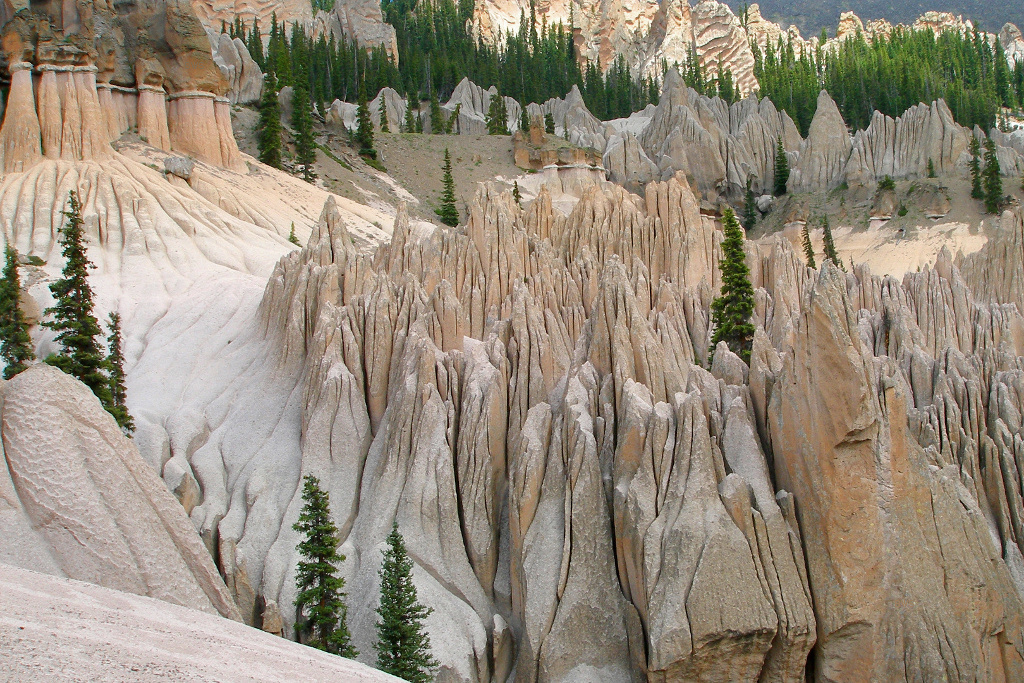
Wheeler Geologic Area

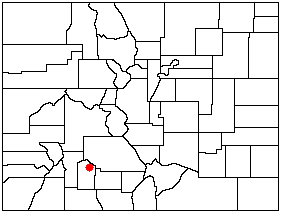
Location within Colorado

The Wheeler Geologic Area is a highly eroded outcropping of layers of volcanic ash, located in the San Juan Mountains in southern Colorado, United States. It is about 10 miles east north-east of Creede. The ash is the result of eruptions from the La Garita Caldera approximately 25 million years ago.

On December 7, 1908, President Theodore Roosevelt designated the area Wheeler National Monument, the first national monument in Colorado. The area's remote location made visitor visits difficult, and on August 3, 1950, President Harry Truman signed an act abolishing the national monument and creating the Wheeler Geologic Area of Rio Grande National Forest. The geologic area is now part of the La Garita Wilderness. Lying just below the crest of the range at an elevation of 11,960 feet (3645 m), it can be reached by an 8.4-mile hike on the East Bellows Trail (FS790), or by a difficult 14 mile four-wheel drive road.

The formations are named after Captain George M. Wheeler, who explored and surveyed the area in 1874 for the U.S. Army.
