= Central Colorado volcanic field =

Volcanic field in Park County, Colorado, United States

- Location within Colorado

Highest point
- Coordinates: 38°49′55.92″N 105°33′15.84″W

Geography
- Location: Park County, Colorado, United States

Geology
- Rock age(s): late Eocene/Oligocene (38–29 Ma)
- Mountain type: Volcanic field

The central Colorado volcanic field (CCVF) is a volcanic field in Park County, Colorado. It is located in the southern Rocky Mountains and covered a roughly triangular area centered on the Thirtynine Mile volcanic area and extending from the Sawatch Range southeast to the northern Sangre de Cristo Range and the Wet Mountains and northeast to the southern Front Range south of Denver. The area covered by the volcanic products of the eruptions included some 22,000 square kilometers (8,500 sq mi) produced by at least ten volcanic centers or calderas. The field overlaps the San Juan volcanic field to the west. The volcanic products date from the late Eocene to the early Oligocene (38 to 29 million years ago).

== Economic significance ==
Rocks of the CCVF host base- and precious metal deposits, including the volcanic diatreme at Cripple Creek, the site of a notable gold rush beginning in 1890. By 1900, more than 500 mines had been established in the Cripple Creek district, and the population exceeded 35,000. Open-pit gold mining continues today.

Outcrops of Wall Mountain Tuff, one of the most widespread extrusive units of the CCVF, may be found near the town of Castle Rock, more than 90 miles (140 km) from the presumed eruptive source of the tuff. Locally known as Castle Rock Rhyolite, the stone was quarried for dimension stone and construction aggregate beginning in 1872 and used in building projects in cities along the Front Range, including Denver and Colorado Springs. The quarries were once important to the economy of the town of Castle Rock: in 1900, the quarries produced up to 1800 rail cars of stone per year and employed up to 100 laborers. Although major operations ceased in 1906, at least one quarry operated as of 2013.

== Notable geological features ==
Name	Elevation	Coordinates	Age
Thirtynine Mile	-	38°49′56″N 105°33′16″W	
Grizzly Peak Caldera	-	39°06′N 106°36′W	
Mount Aetna Caldera	-	38°36′N 106°18′W	
Bonanza Caldera	-	38°17′42″N 106°06′00″W	
Marshall Creek Caldera	-	38°24′N 106°18′W	

== See also ==
- List of volcanoes in the United States
- List of volcanic fields
- Central Colorado
