= Powderhorn Wilderness =

Protected area in southwestern Colorado, United States

- IUCN category Ib (wilderness area)
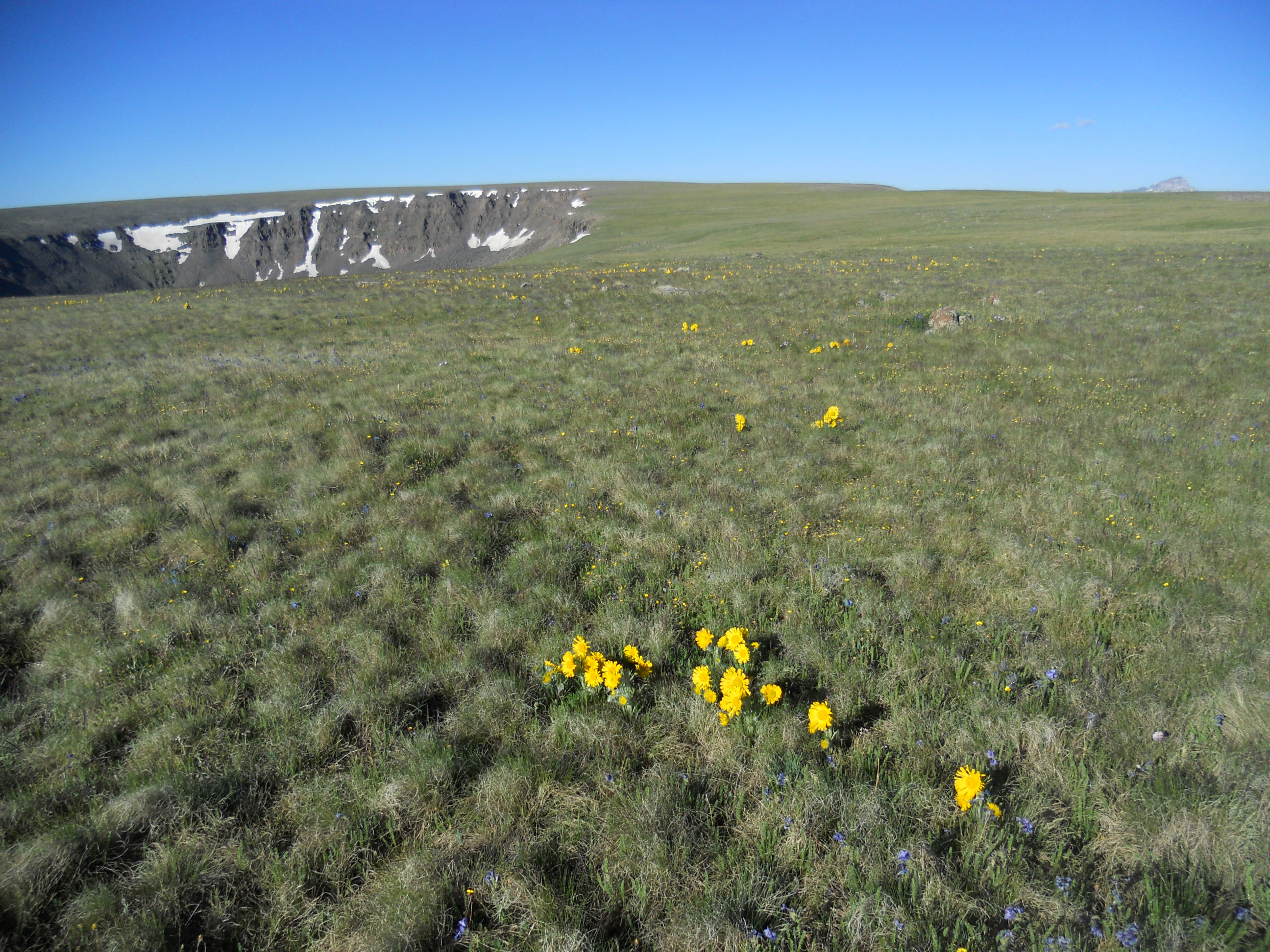
- Calf Creek Plateau, the highest summit in the Powderhorn Wilderness.

- Location within the United States
- Location: Hinsdale / Gunnison counties, Colorado, USA
- Nearest city: Gunnison, CO
- Coordinates: 38°6′N 107°11′W
- Area: 62,050 acres (251.1 km^{2})
- Established: January 1, 1993
- Governing body: Bureau of Land Management / U.S. Forest Service

The Powderhorn Wilderness is a 62,050-acre (251.1 km^{2}) wilderness area in Hinsdale and Gunnison counties, Colorado, United States, located 5 miles (8.0 km) northeast of Lake City.

== Description ==
Most of the northern part of the wilderness area, 48,115 acres (194.71 km^{2}), about 77.5%, is located on Bureau of Land Management land and its southern portion, 13,935 acres (56.39 km^{2}), about 22.5%, is located within the Gunnison National Forest. Elevations in the wilderness range from 8,500 feet (2,600 m) at the West Fork Powderhorn Creek to 12,661 feet (3,859 m) at the summit of Calf Creek Plateau.

The Powderhorn Wilderness is an important watershed for the Gunnison River. The area protects the East, Middle, and West forks of Powderhorn Creek, which flow into Cebolla Creek and then the Gunnison River. Calf Creek, which is on National Forest land, flows south and eventually joins Cebolla Creek. Within the wilderness area there are numerous small lakes and beaver ponds. The largest of these are Devil's Lake and Powderhorn Lake.

Much of the area sits above timberline at 12,000 feet (3,700 m) and it is recognized as one of the largest expanses of tundra in the contiguous United States.

== Geology ==
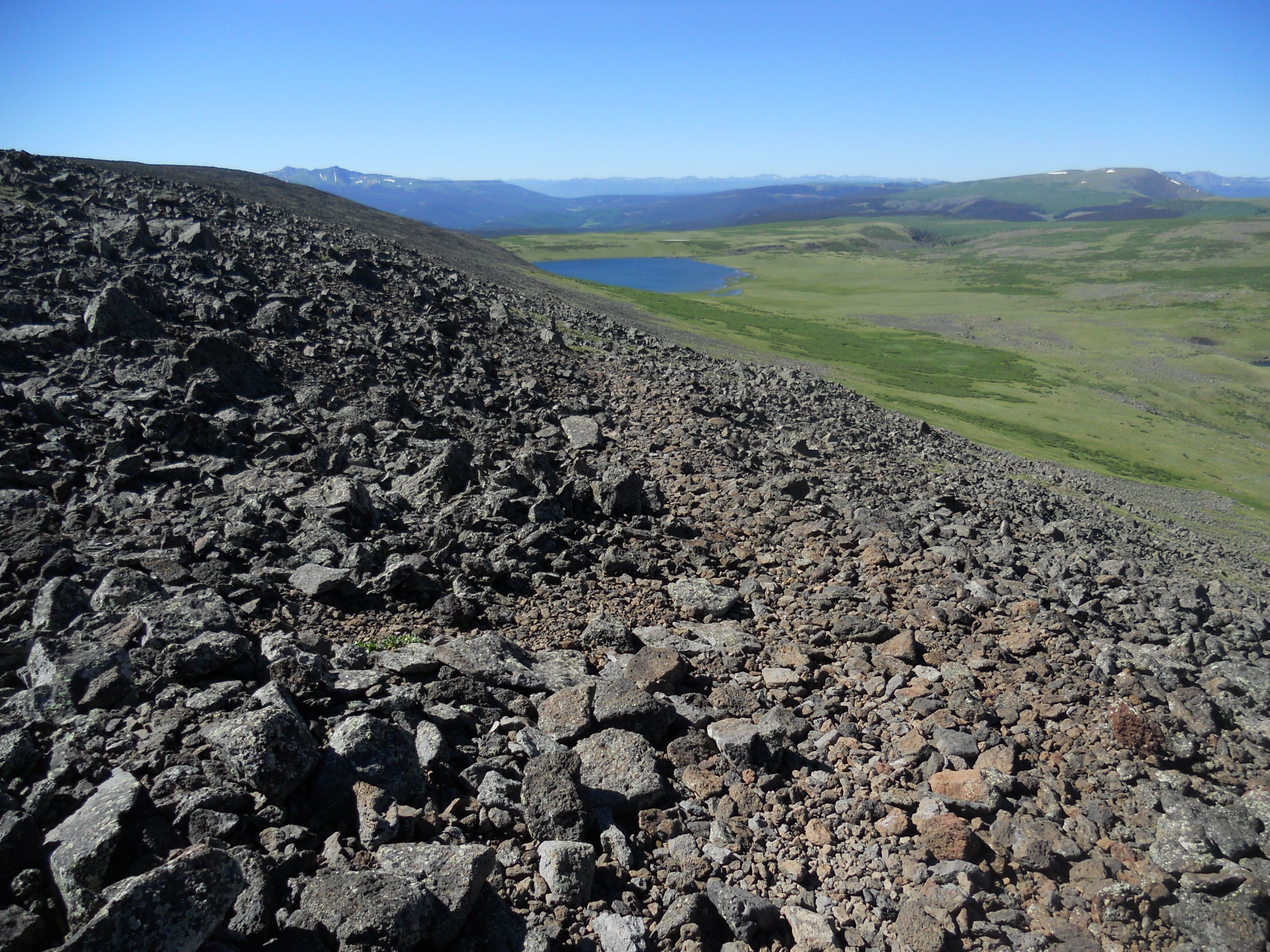
Basaltic rock of the Hinsdale Formation. Devils Lake, the largest lake in the Powderhorn Wilderness, is in the distance.

The Powderhorn Wilderness is within the San Juan volcanic field and volcanic rocks dominate the region. The central, highest terrain of the wilderness is composed of basaltic lava flows of the Hinsdale Formation, which are dated at 16 to 19 million years old. These lava flows are thought to be among the last volcanic events in the area and are some of the best preserved. The Hinsdale Formation lava flows form an expansive alpine highland where the two highest ridges are Calf Creek Plateau and Cannibal Plateau.

Underlying these basalt flows are sheets of older volcanic rocks that are exposed around the periphery of the wilderness. From youngest to oldest, these rocks include Cochetopa Park Tuff, Nelson Mountain Tuff, Carpenter Ridge Tuff, and Fish Canyon Tuff. The volcanic ash that formed these tuffs came from Oligocene eruptions within the San Juan volcanic field. These eruption sites are the Cochetopa Caldera, San Luis Caldera, Bachelor Caldera, and La Garita Caldera, respectively. On the northern and western reaches of the wilderness there are yet older volcanic rocks exposed. These Oligocene lavas and breccias have been dated at 32 million years old.

The Powderhorn Wilderness was glaciated, and the most prominent glacial cirques are located on the north side of the wilderness. Powderhorn Lakes, popular hiking destinations, are located in one of these cirques.

== Flora and fauna ==
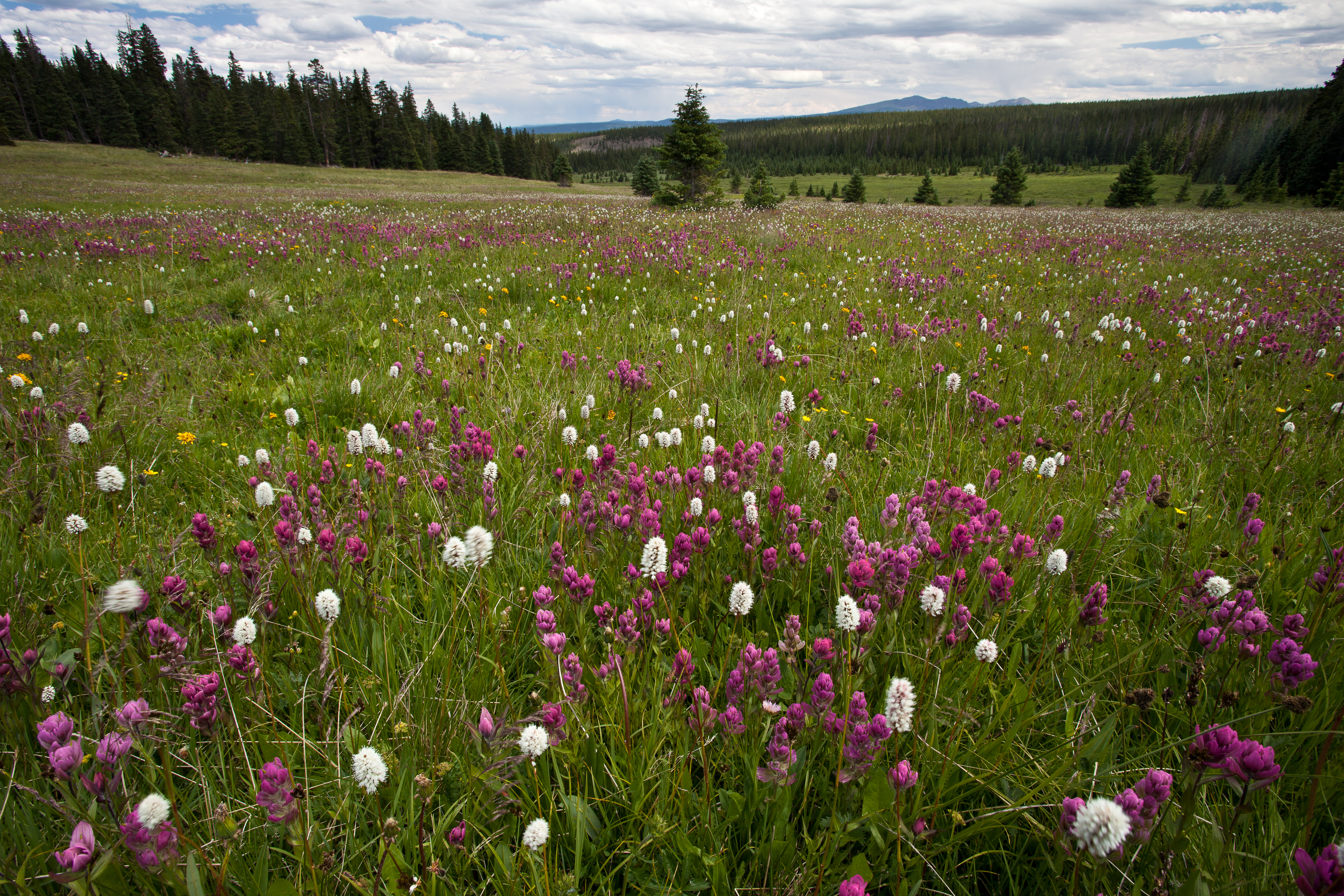
Wildflowers in a subalpine meadow within the Powderhorn Wilderness.

Half of the Powderhorn Wilderness is above tree line and the alpine tundra here is dominated by grasses and forbs, though there are also extensive thickets of willow. Below, the subalpine forest is dominated by Engelmann spruce and subalpine fir, and interspersed are numerous subalpine meadows of grasses and forbs. There are also stands of aspen. At lower elevations, particularly in the northern extension of the wilderness, montane forests occur and ponderosa pine is often dominate. Sagebrush steppe becomes increasingly common at lower elevations, particularly on drier hillsides.

The wilderness serves as important summer range for mule deer and elk. Other mammals include mountain lions, black bears, bobcats, coyotes, martens, marmots, and pikas.

== Hiking ==
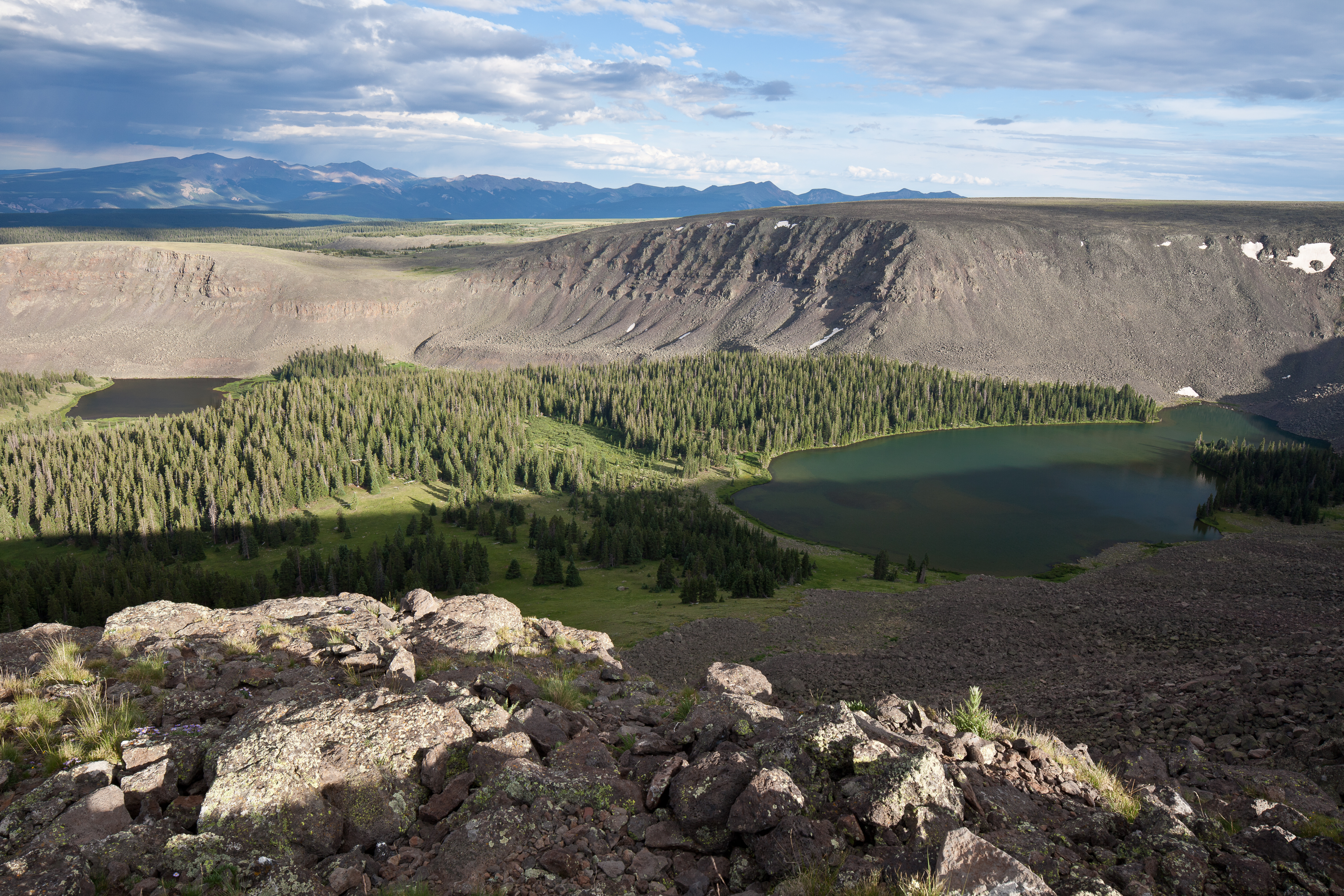
Powderhorn Lakes.

Travel through the wilderness is limited to those on foot and horseback. There are six trailheads that provide access to the wilderness. To the west is the Devils Creek Trailhead (8,478 feet (2,584 m)). Along the north and northeast boundary are the Powderhorn Lake (11,143 feet (3,396 m)) and Ten Mile Spring (9,327 feet (2,843 m)) trailheads. And to the south are the Deer Lakes (10,444 feet (3,183 m)), Brush Creek (9,926 feet (3,025 m)), and Powderhorn Park (9,047 feet (2,758 m)) trailheads. These trailheads provide access to 45 miles (72 km) of interconnecting trails allowing multiple options for trips in the wilderness.

The most popular destination in the wilderness is Powderhorn Lakes. These two lakes are nestled in a beautiful glacial cirque, and the 4.8-mile (7.7 km) trip one-way is well worth the effort. Start at the Powderhorn Lake Trailhead and take the well-maintained Powderhorn Lakes Trail south to the lakes. The upper lake is at an elevation of (11,860 feet (3,615 m)). Given the popularity of this trail, those seeking remoteness and more solitude may find other trails and destinations more rewarding.
