= Wah Wah Springs Caldera =

Caldera in the state of Utah

Coordinates: 38.4796°N 113.4894°W

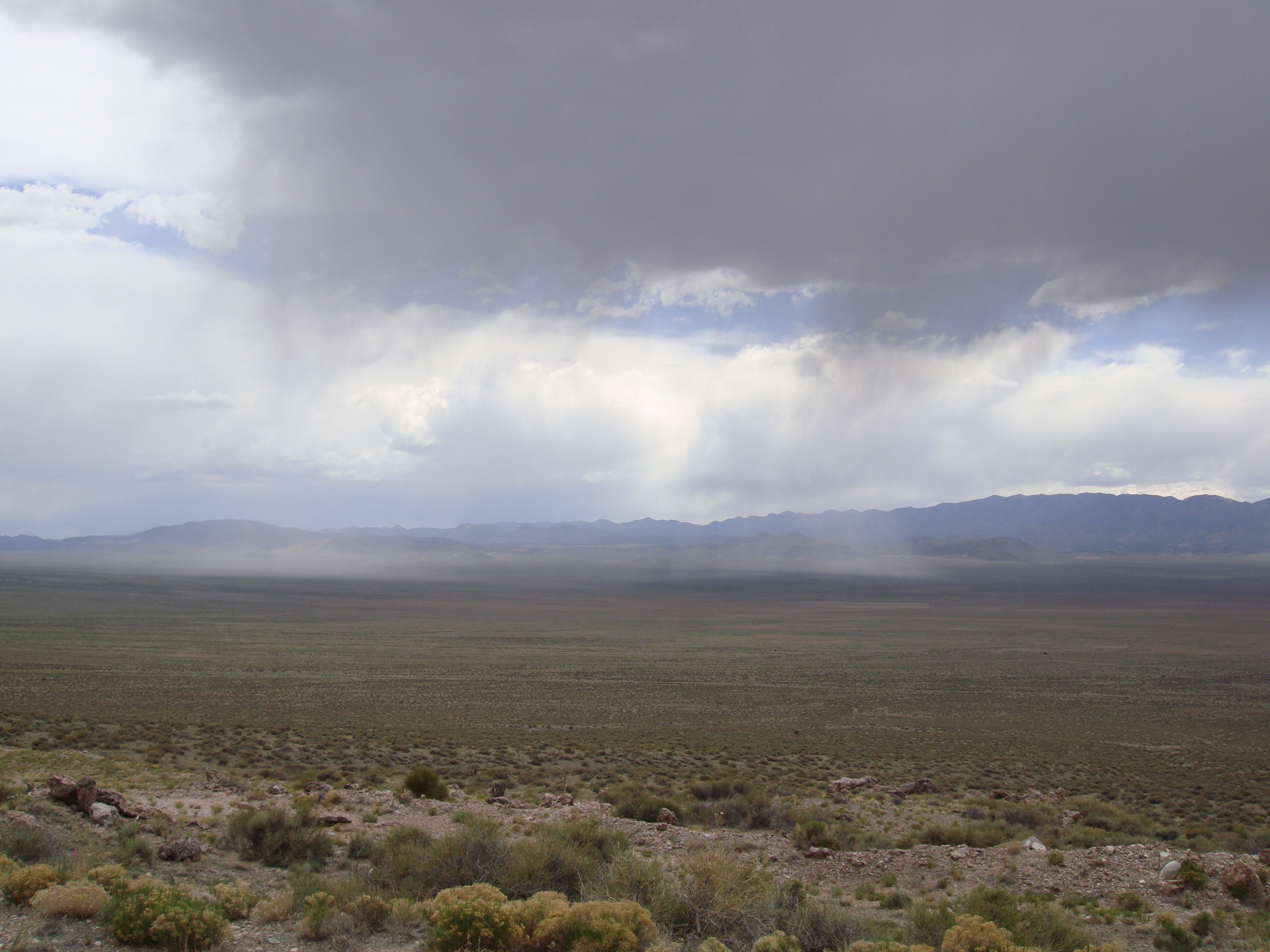
- A summer storm hits Wah Wah Valley and the Wah Wah Mountains, in May 2009
- Date: 30.06 Ma
- Type: Caldera
- Location: Southwestern Utah
- Area: 32,000 km² (12,355 mi²)
- Volume: 5,900 km³ (1,415 mi³)
- VEI: 8

Location of the Wah Wah Spring Caldera in the US state of Utah.

Wah Wah Springs Caldera is an extinct volcanic caldera located in the US state of Utah. Discovered in 2013, the Wah Wah Springs caldera produced one of the largest explosive eruptions by volume in Earth's history. The estimated eruptive volume was ~5,500 to 5,900 cubic kilometres (1,300 to 1,400 mi^{3}) of dacite. Also known as the Wah Wah Springs formation, it erupted ~30.06 million years ago in the early Oligocene. It is the largest known eruption of the Indian Peak–Caliente Caldera Complex, and includes flows over 500 m (1,640 feet) thick. It was the second most energetic event to have occurred on Earth since the asteroid impact at the end of the Cretaceous period.

== Geology ==
Between 36 and 18 Ma, the greater Indian Peak–Caliente caldera complex produced multiple caldera-forming eruptions. The volcanic complex is located in the Basin and Range Province of the western United States. The eruptive volumes associated with many eruptions was truly colossal. Over the course of ~18 Ma, geologists have identified at least 50 different ignimbrite cooling units. The total eruptive volume from all eruptions in the field is estimated to be ~33,000 cubic kilometers, spread out over 60,000 square kilometers.

=== Geological background ===
Volcanism in the Indian Peak–Caliente caldera complex is not fully understood. A leading theory is flat slab subduction led to increased slab rollback. Between 70 and 40 Ma, the subduction decent angle of the Farallon plate shallowed considerably. The shallowing was also responsible for the Laramide Orogeny which created the Rocky Mountains. Once slab rollback strengthened, this caused the Farallon slab to steepen again. This in turn caused the continental volcanic arc to shift progressively westward towards the Pacific Ocean. Another theory is that the Farallon plate subducted an aseismic (mid-ocean ridge). This caused progressively hotter and more buoyant oceanic crust to be subducted, causing the down-going plate to shallow. The change in subduction angled caused magma to pool underground in large amounts.

== Magma volume and chemical make-up ==
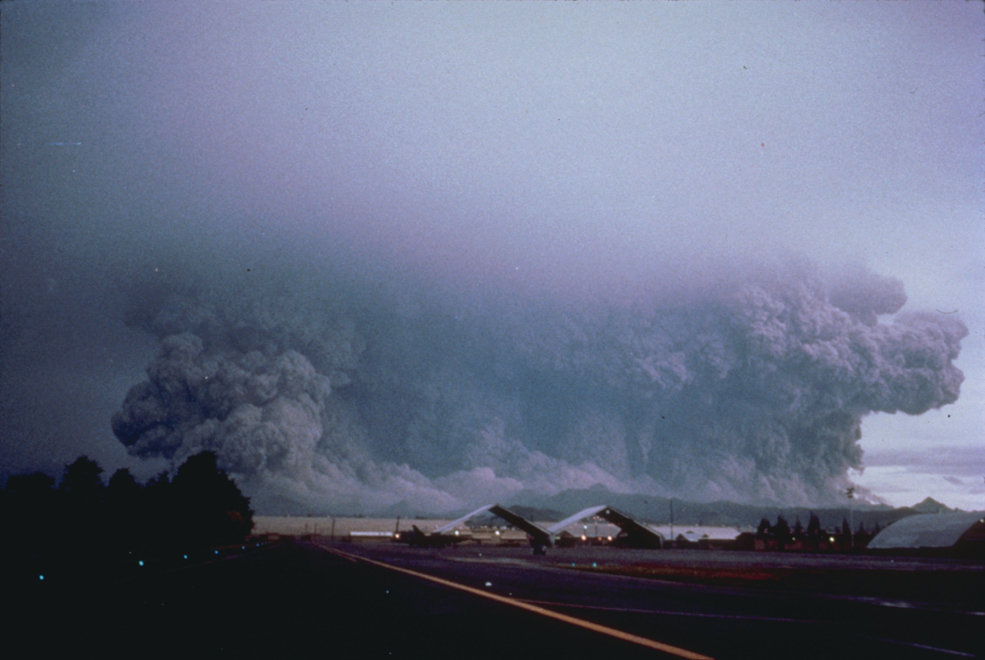
The eruption of Mount Pinatubo in June 1991 is a well-known example of an eruption of dacite lava.

Like most large caldera forming eruptions (VEI-8), magma under Wah Wah Spring underwent multiple cycles of fractional crystallization. This process involves small volume pulses of magma being intruded over a long period of time. In between pulses, magma has time to cool and solidify before the next magma pulse is introduced. Once cooled underground, the magma is known as a pluton. This process allows magma to collect in large amounts, which is what happened at Wah Wah Springs. In addition, magma was generated under an unusually thick crust (~70 km). The dacite produced was relatively cool (700-800 C), water rich, and were mantle-derived basaltic magmas.

Lavas found at Wah Wah Spring are almost exclusively made up of calc-alkaline (68 wt. % SiO2) and phenocryst-rich (38 vol.%) dacite. While not a viscous as rhyolite, these eruptions can be highly explosive.

The resulting structural caldera size formed by the 30.06 Ma eruption is ~1,000 km² (386 mi²). The eruptive volume of 5,900 km³ is the average taken for 4 different models:

Model 1: ~6,000 km³

Model 2: ~6,200 km³

Model 3: ~5,799 km³

Model 4: ~5,900 km³

Average: 5,900 km³

*Note: Model 1: doubles the volume of pre-caldera collapse volumes. Model 2: (the highest volume) is the estimate for the entire unit. Model 3: A more realistic asymmetric in which the intracaldera tuff ranges from a thickness contour of 1000 m coincident with the southern structural margin to a maximum contour of 4000 m inside the caldera. Model 4: Uses data from the La Garita eruption in Colorado as an example. This model estimates how far the caldera floor dropped after the eruption.

== See also ==
- List of largest volcanic eruptions
- Supervolcano
- Laramide Orogeny
- Lake Toba
- Yellowstone Caldera
