= Chattian =

Second age of the Oligocene Epoch

- 27.30 – 23.04 Ma

Chronology
← / PETM; ← / First Antarctic permanent ice-sheets; ← / K-Pg mass extinction
Subdivision of the Paleogene according to the ICS, as of 2024. Vertical axis scale: Millions of years ago
- Formerly part of: Tertiary Period/System

Etymology
- Name formality: Formal

Usage information
- Celestial body: Earth
- Regional usage: Global (ICS)
- Time scale(s) used: ICS Time Scale

Definition
- Chronological unit: Age
- Stratigraphic unit: Stage
- Time span formality: Formal
- Lower boundary definition: LAD of the Planktonic Foraminifer Chiloguembelina (Base of Foram Zone P21b)
- Lower boundary GSSP: Monte Cagnero, Central Apennines, Italy; 43.6466°N 12.4677°E
- Lower GSSP ratified: September 2016
- Upper boundary definition: Base of magnetic polarity chronozone C6Cn.2n.; FAD of the Planktonic Foraminiferan Paragloborotalia kugleri
- Upper boundary GSSP: Lemme-Carrosio Section, Carrosio, Italy; 44.6589°N 8.8364°E
- Upper GSSP ratified: 1996

The Chattian is, in the geologic timescale, the younger of two ages or upper of two stages of the Oligocene Epoch/Series. It spans the time between 27.3 and 23.04 Ma. The Chattian is preceded by the Rupelian and is followed by the Aquitanian (the lowest stage of the Miocene).

== Stratigraphic definition ==
The Chattian was introduced by Austrian palaeontologist Theodor Fuchs in 1894. Fuchs named the stage after the Chatti, a Germanic tribe. The original type locality was near the German city of Kassel.

The base of the Chattian is at the extinction of the foram genus Chiloguembelina (which is also the base of foram biozone P21b). An official GSSP for the Chattian Stage was ratified in October 2016.

The top of the Chattian Stage (which is the base of the Aquitanian Stage, Miocene Series and Neogene System) is at the first appearance of foram species Paragloborotalia kugleri, the extinction of calcareous nanoplankton species Reticulofenestra bisecta (which forms the base of nanoplankton biozone NN1), and the base of magnetic C6Cn.2n.

The Chattian is coeval with regionally used stages or zones such as the upper Avernian European mammal zone (it spans the Mammal Paleogene zones 30 through 26 and part of 25); the upper Geringian and lower Arikareean mammal zones of North America; most of the Deseadan mammal zone of South America; the upper Hsandgolian and whole Tabenbulakian mammal zone of Asia; the upper Kiscellian and lower Egerian Paratethys stages of Central and eastern Europe; the upper Janjukian and lower Longfordian Australian regional stages; the Otaian, Waitakian, and Duntroonian stages of the New Zealand geologic time scale; and part of the Zemorrian Californian stage and Chickasawhayan regional stage of the eastern US.

== Volcanic event ==
During the Chattian the largest known single-event volcanic eruption occurred: the Fish Canyon eruption of La Garita with a magnitude of 9.2 and VEI of 8. It has been dated to 27.51 Ma ago.
