= Mid-Tertiary ignimbrite flare-up =

Period of volcanic eruptions in mid-Cenozoic time

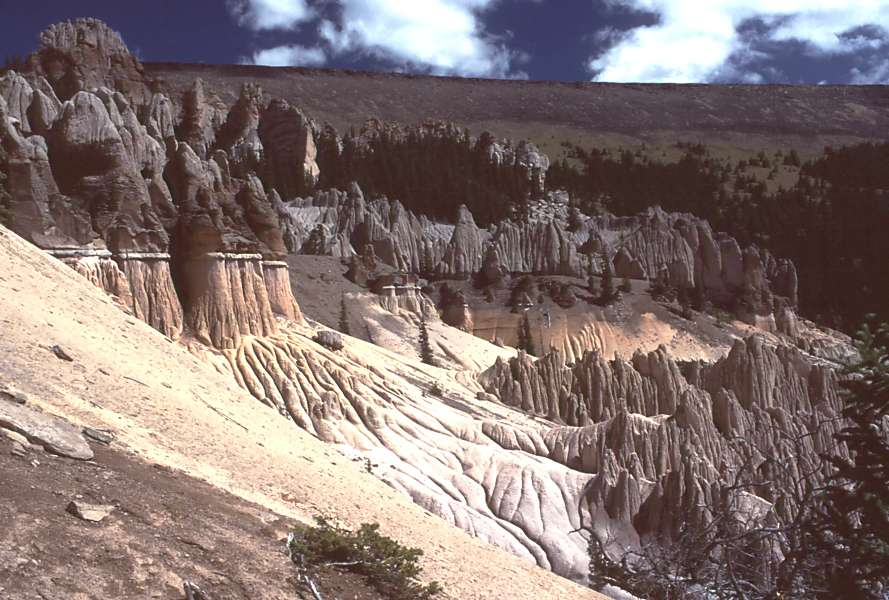
- Wheeler Geologic Area, rocks of the San Luis Caldera complex
- Volcano: Multiple cumulative events
- Date: 25-40 million years ago
- Location: Western United States
- Impact: Deposited vast swatches of ignimbrite across the western United States

The Mid-Tertiary ignimbrite flare-up, (Note: This designation has as a part of it a term, 'Tertiary', that is now discouraged as a formal geochronological unit by the International Commission on Stratigraphy.) was a dramatic period of volcanic eruptions in mid-Cenozoic time, approximately 25–40 million years ago, centered in the western United States. These eruptions are seen today as deposits of ignimbrite, the pyroclastic material that was laid down from these eruptions.

== Overview ==
There were numerous eruptions within the flare-up. The total volume includes 5 × 10^{5} km^{3} of ash flow tuff and 5 × 10^{6} km^{3} of intermediate and silicic lava. This amount is on par for some of the largest non-explosive volcanic provinces (see World's largest eruptions). For reference, the 1980 eruption of Mt. St. Helens was about 1 km^{3}. The largest eruption on the flare-up, and also one of the largest explosive eruptions ever known, was the Fish Canyon tuff in southwest Colorado. Its volume alone is 5,000 km^{3}. The three primary volcanic centers of the flare-up are the Central Nevada volcanic field of central Nevada, Indian Peak volcanic field of eastern Nevada/western Utah, and the San Juan volcanic field in Colorado.

== Cause ==
The primary tectonic driving force behind this explosive volcanic activity is slab rollback. During the Laramide orogeny, the subducting Farallon Plate subducted at a very shallow angle. When this stopped, the mantle wedge was opened up, and the result was the flare-up. The specifics of this opening, including possible slab rollback, slab windows, or buckling of the plate, can explain specific volcanic trends within the flare-up.

== See also ==
- List of large volume volcanic eruptions in the Basin and Range Province
- Slab gap hypothesis
