= Cannibal Plateau =

Summit in Hinsdale County, Colorado, U.S.

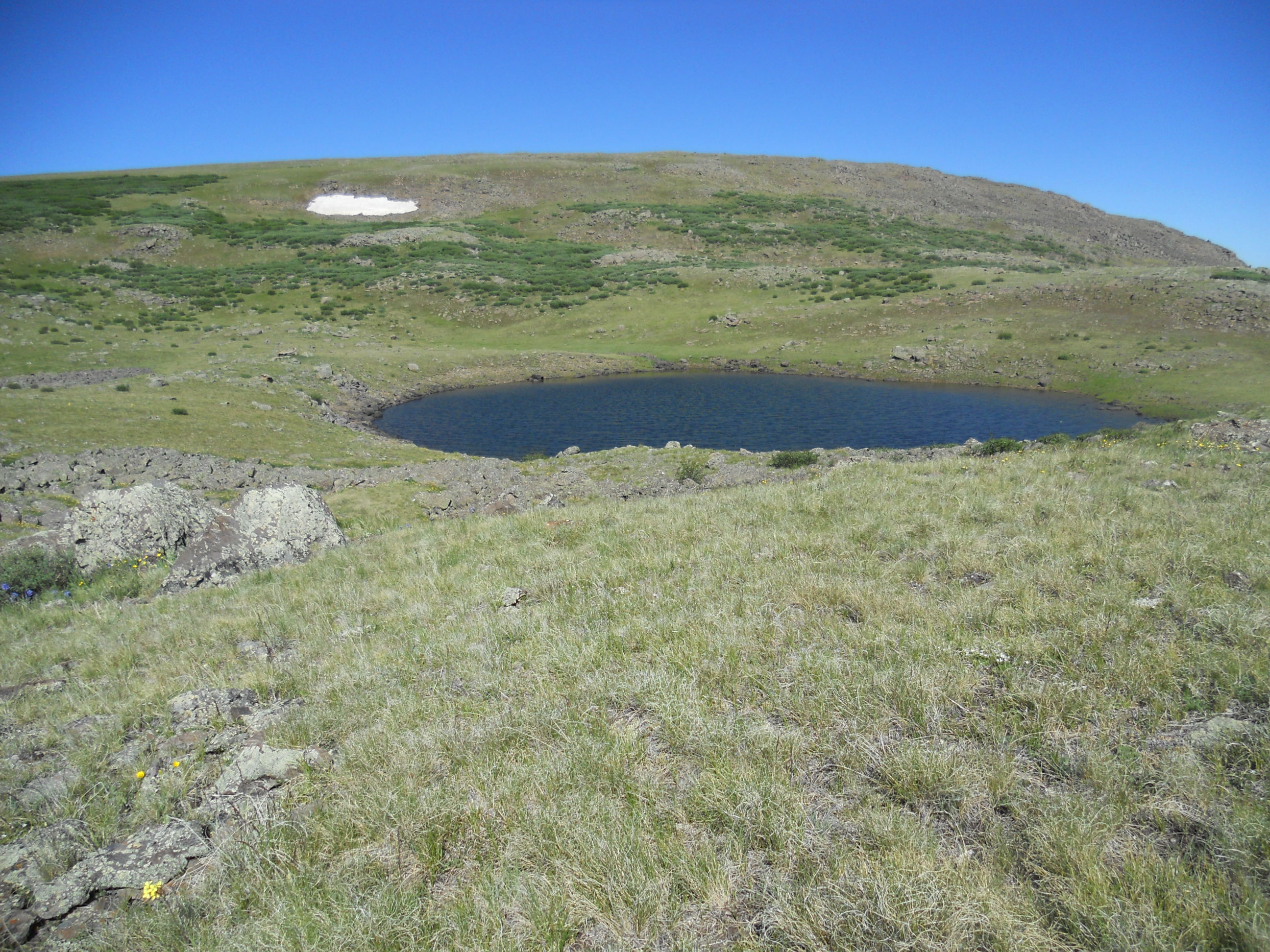
- Cannibal Plateau viewed from the east

Highest point
- Elevation: 12,533 ft (3,820 m)
- Prominence: 402 ft (123 m)
- Isolation: 1.56 mi (2.51 km)
- Coordinates: 38°06′24″N 107°13′45″W

Geography
- Location within Colorado
- Location: Hinsdale County, Colorado, U.S.
- Parent range: San Juan Mountains
- Topo map(s): USGS 7.5' topographic map Cannibal Plateau

Cannibal Plateau is a summit in Hinsdale County, Colorado, in the United States. The broad 12,533-foot (3,820 m) mountain is located in the San Juan Mountains and within the Powderhorn Wilderness, a protected area managed by the Bureau of Land Management Gunnison Field Office and the Gunnison National Forest.

Cannibal Plateau was named after an incident of cannibalism by Alferd Packer. The massacre site is near Lake City, 8 miles (13 km) southwest of the plateau.

== Geology ==
Cannibal Plateau is composed of basaltic lava flows of the Hinsdale Formation, which are dated as 16 to 19 million years old. These lava flows are thought to be among the last volcanic events within the San Juan volcanic field and are therefore some of the best preserved. The Hinsdale Formation lava flows form an expansive alpine highland where the two highest ridges are Cannibal Plateau and nearby Calf Creek Plateau.

== Hiking ==
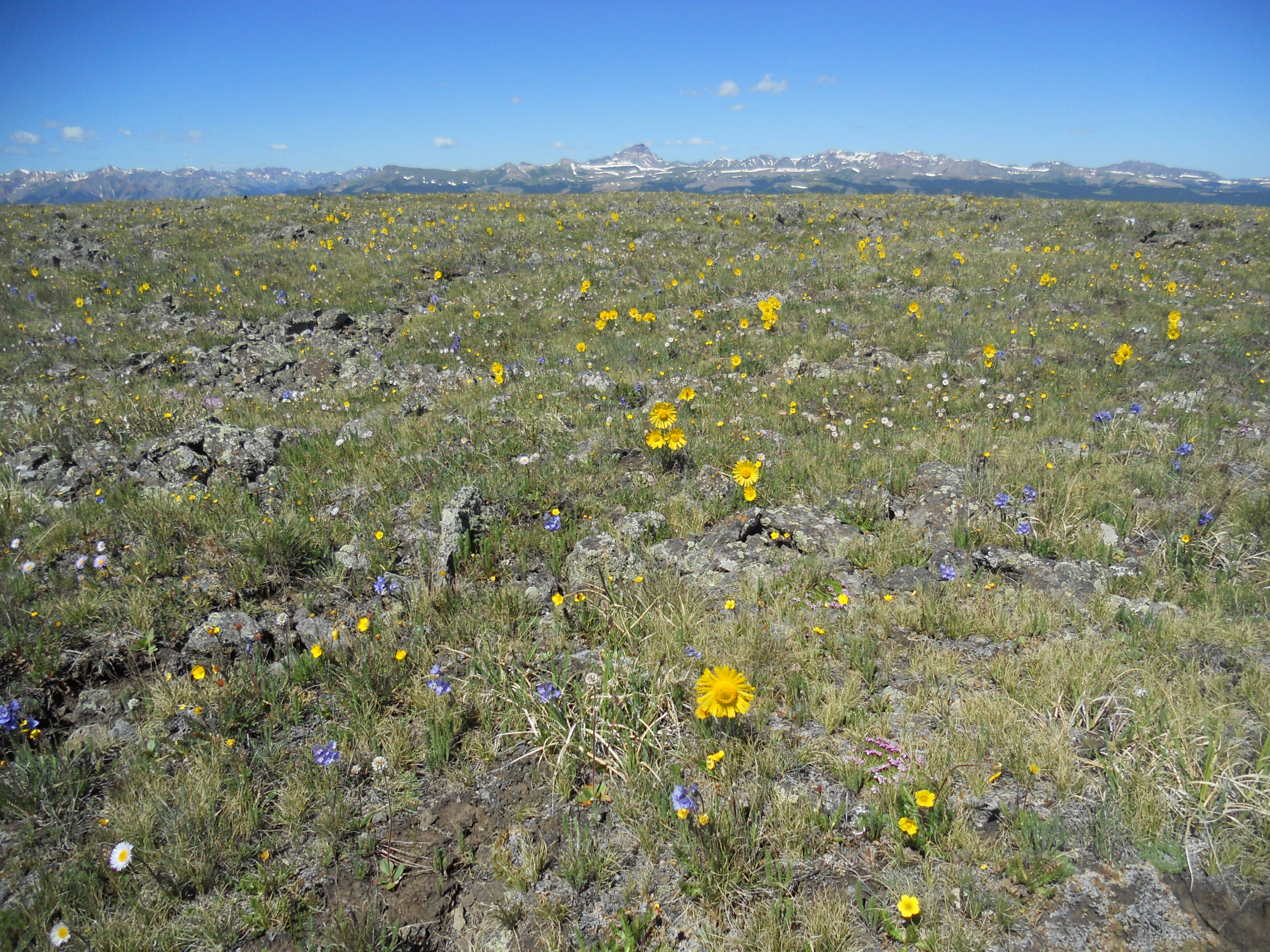
Summit of Cannibal Plateau with a view of distant peaks to the west

The easiest route to the summit starts at the Powderhorn Lakes Trailhead located at the northern edge of the wilderness area. The Powderhorn Lakes Trail can be taken southwest 1.4 miles (2.3 km). Where the trail turns southeast toward Powderhorn Lakes, leave the trail and continue 3.0 miles (4.8 km) up the ridge through meadows and eventually alpine tundra to the broad summit of Calf Creek Plateau. From there it is a 2.3 miles (3.7 km) hike southwest across the tundra to Cannibal Plateau. This requires descending to the 12,080-foot (3,682 m) saddle before climbing 450 feet (137 m) up to the Cannibal Plateau summit. The elevation gain on this 13.5 miles (21.7 km) round trip is 2,600 feet (792 m). This includes the climb of 600 feet (183 m) back up to Calf Creek Plateau on the return. The views along this alpine hike are expansive.

Cannibal Plateau can also be reached from the Devil’s Creek Trailhead to the west and the Deer Lakes, Brush Creek, and Powderhorn Park trailheads to the south. All these routes begin in subalpine forests before emerging into the scenic alpine landscape of the Powderhorn Wilderness.
