= List of largest volcanic eruptions =

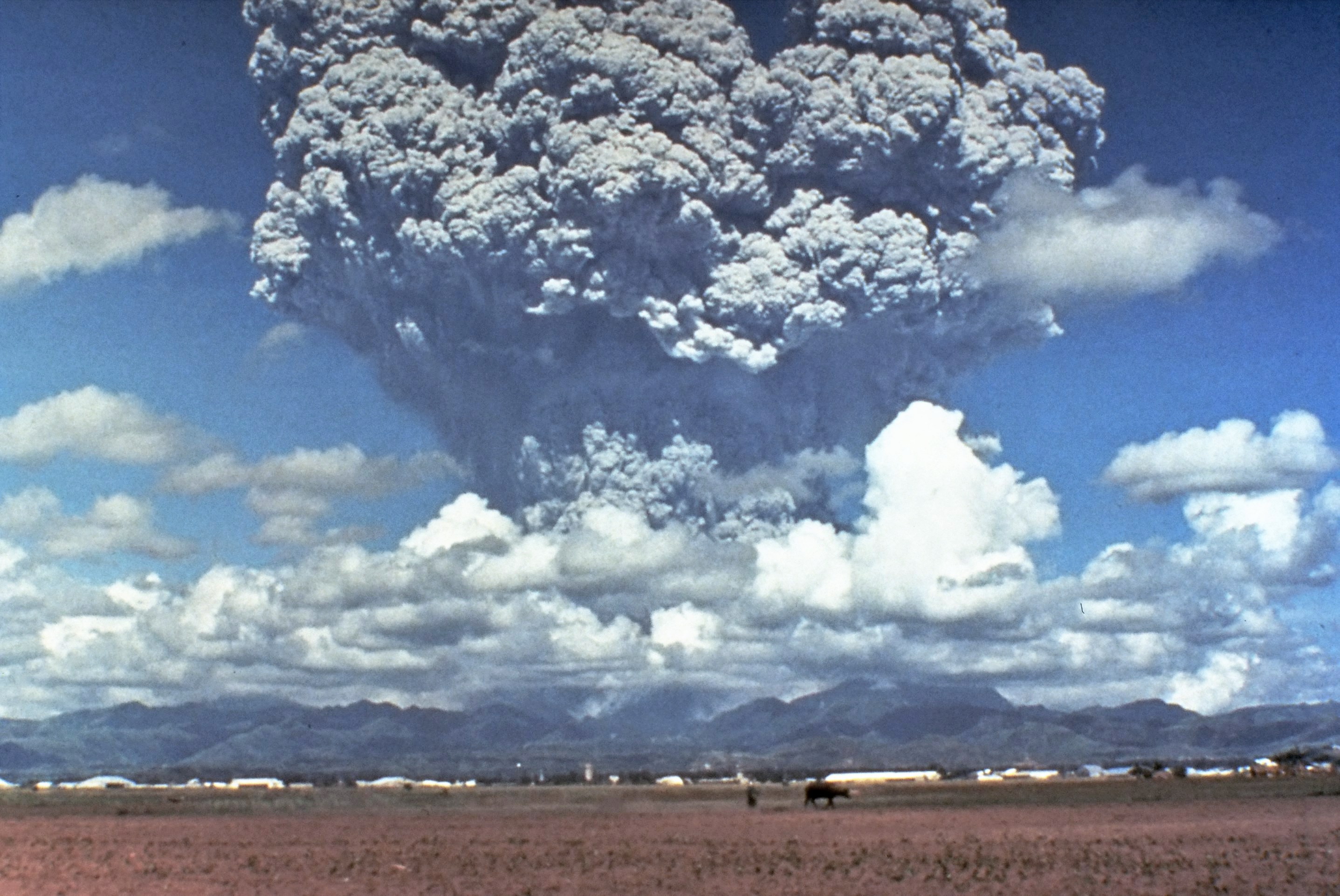
The 1991 eruption of Mount Pinatubo, the largest eruption since 1912, is dwarfed by the eruptions in this list.

In a volcanic eruption, lava, volcanic bombs, ash, and various gases are expelled from a volcanic vent and fissure. While many eruptions only pose dangers to the immediately surrounding area, Earth's largest eruptions can have a major regional or even global impact, with some affecting the climate and contributing to mass extinctions. Volcanic eruptions can generally be characterized as either explosive eruptions, sudden ejections of rock and ash, or effusive eruptions, relatively gentle outpourings of lava. A separate list is given below for each type.

There have likely been many such eruptions during Earth's history beyond those shown in these lists. However, erosion and plate tectonics have taken their toll, and many eruptions have not left enough evidence for geologists to establish their size. Even for the eruptions listed here, estimates of the volume erupted can be subject to considerable uncertainty.

== Explosive eruptions ==
In explosive eruptions, the eruption of magma is driven by the rapid release of pressure, often involving the explosion of gas previously dissolved within the material. The most famous and destructive historical eruptions are mainly of this type. An eruptive phase can consist of a single eruption, or a sequence of several eruptions spread over several days, weeks or months. Explosive eruptions usually involve thick, highly viscous, silicic or felsic magma, high in volatiles like water vapor and carbon dioxide. Pyroclastic materials are the primary product, typically in the form of tuff. Eruptions the size of that at Lake Toba 74,000 years ago, at least 2,800 cubic kilometres (670 cu mi), or the Yellowstone eruption 640,000 years ago, around 1,000 cubic kilometres (240 cu mi), occur worldwide every 50,000 to 100,000 years. (Note: Certain felsic provinces, such as the Chon Aike province in Argentina and the Whitsunday igneous province of Australia, are not included in this list because they are composed of many separate eruptions that have not been distinguished.)

Volcano—eruption	Age (millions of years) (Note: Dates are an average of the range of dates of volcanics.)	Location	Volume (km^{3}) (Note: These volumes are estimated total volumes of tephra ejected. If the available sources only report a dense rock equivalent volume, the number is italicized but not converted into a tephra volume.)	Notes	Ref.
Lake Toba Caldera—Youngest Toba Tuff	0.073	Sunda Arc, Indonesia	2,000–13,200	Largest-known eruption on earth in at least the last million years with most estimates placing it at 2,800 km^{3}, possibly responsible for a population bottleneck of the human species (see Toba catastrophe theory)	
Flat Landing Brook Eruption	466–465	Flat Landing Brook Formation	2,000–12,000	One of the largest and oldest supereruptions. Existence as a single eruption is controversial. Possibly a multiple 2,000+ km^{3} event under a million years.	
Sam Ignimbrite and Green Tuff	29.5	Yemen	6,797–6,803	Volume includes 5,550 km^{3} of distal tuffs. This estimate is uncertain to a factor of 2 or 3.	
Wah Wah Springs Tuff	30.06	Indian Peak-Caliente Caldera Complex	5,500–5,900	The largest of the Indian Peak-Caliente Caldera Complex, and includes flows over 4,000 metres thick at the most.	
La Garita Caldera—Fish Canyon Tuff	27.8	San Juan volcanic field, Colorado	5,000	Part of at least 20 large caldera-forming eruptions in the San Juan volcanic field and surrounding area that formed around 26 to 35 Ma.	
Lund Tuff	29.2	Indian Peak-Caliente Caldera Complex	4,400	Formed the White Rock Caldera, one of the largest eruptions of the Mid-Tertiary Ignimbrite flareup	
Jabal Kura'a Ignimbrite	29.6	Yemen	3,797–3,803	Volume estimate is uncertain to a factor of 2 or 3.	
Windows Butte tuff	31.4	William's Ridge, central Nevada	3,500	Part of the Mid-Tertiary ignimbrite flare-up	
Oxaya ignimbrites	19	Chile	3,000	Really a regional correlation of many ignimbrites originally thought to be distinct	
Gakkel Ridge Caldera	1.1	Gakkel Ridge	3,000	It is the only known supervolcano located directly on the mid-ocean ridge.	
Grey's Landing Supereruption	8.72	Located in southern Idaho	>2,800	One of 2 previously unknown Yellowstone hotspot Supereruptions; Largest Yellowstone eruption.	
Pacana Caldera—Atana ignimbrite	4	Chile	>3,500	Forms a resurgent caldera.	
Mangakino Caldera—Kidnappers ignimbrite	1.01	Taupō Volcanic Zone, New Zealand	2,760		
Iftar Alkalb—Tephra 4 W	29.5	Afro-Arabian	2,700		
Yellowstone Caldera—Huckleberry Ridge Tuff	2.059	Yellowstone hotspot	2,450–2,500	One of the largest Yellowstone eruptions on record	
Nohi Rhyolite—Gero Ash-Flow Sheet	70	Honshu, Japan	2,200	Nohi Rhyolite total volume over 7,000 km^{3} in 70 to 72 Ma, Gero Ash-Flow Sheet being the largest	
Whakamaru	0.254	Taupō Volcanic Zone, New Zealand	2,000	Largest in the Southern Hemisphere in the Late Quaternary	
Kilgore tuff	4.3	Near Kilgore, Idaho	1,800	Last of the eruptions from the Heise volcanic field	
McMullen Creek Ignimbrite	8.99	Located in southern Idaho	>1,700	One of 2 previously unknown Yellowstone hotspot eruptions.	
Sana'a Ignimbrite—Tephra 2W63	29.5	Afro-Arabian	1,600		
Deicke and Millbrig	454	England, exposed in Northern Europe and Eastern US	1,509 (Note: Also the site of 972 and 943 km^{3} (233 and 226 cu mi) eruptions.)	One of the oldest large eruptions preserved	
Blacktail tuff	6.5	Blacktail, Idaho	1,500	First of several eruptions from the Heise volcanic field	
Mangakino Caldera—Rocky Hill	1	Taupō Volcanic Zone, New Zealand	1,495		
Aso Caldera	0.087	Kyushu, Japan	930–1,860	Aso-4 ignimbrite	
Emory Caldera—Kneeling Nun tuff	33	Mogollon-Datil volcanic field	1,310		
Omine-Odai Caldera—Murou pyroclastic flow	13.7	Honshū, Japan	1,260	A part of the large eruptions that occurred in southwest Japan to 13 to 15 Ma.	
Timber Mountain tuff	11.6	Southwestern Nevada	1,200	Also includes a 900 cubic km tuff as a second member in the tuff	
Paintbrush tuff (Tonopah Spring Member)	12.8	Southwestern Nevada	1,200	Related to a 1,000 km^{3} tuff (Tiva Canyon Member) as another member in the Paintbrush tuff	
Bachelor—Carpenter Ridge tuff	28	San Juan volcanic field	1,200	Part of at least 20 large caldera-forming eruptions in the San Juan volcanic field and surrounding area that formed around 26 to 35 Ma	
Bursum—Apache Springs Tuff	28.5	Mogollon-Datil volcanic field	1,200	Related to a 1050 cubic km tuff, the Bloodgood Canyon tuff	
Taupō Volcano—Oruanui eruption	0.027	Taupō Volcanic Zone, New Zealand	1,170	Most recent VEI 8 eruption	
Mangakino Caldera—Ongatiti–Mangatewaiiti	1.21	Taupō Volcanic Zone, New Zealand	1,150		
Huaylillas Ignimbrite	15	Bolivia	1,100	Predates half of the uplift of the central Andes	
Bursum—Bloodgood Canyon Tuff	28.5	Mogollon-Datil volcanic field	1,050	Related to a 1200 cubic km tuff, the Apache Springs tuff	
Okueyama Caldera	13.7	Kyushu, Japan	1,030	A part of the large eruptions that occurred in southwest Japan to 13 to 15 Ma	
Yellowstone Caldera—Lava Creek Tuff	0.639	Yellowstone hotspot	1,000	Last large eruption in the Yellowstone National Park area estimated energy yield 875,000 megatons of TNT	
Awasa Caldera	1.09	Great Rift Valley, Ethiopia	1,000		
Cerro Galán	2.2	Catamarca Province, Argentina	1,000	Elliptical caldera is ~35 km wide	
Paintbrush tuff (Tiva Canyon Member)	12.7	Southwestern Nevada	1,000	Related to a 1200 cubic km tuff (Topopah Spring Member) as another member in the Paintbrush tuff	
San Juan—Sapinero Mesa Tuff	28	San Juan volcanic field	1,000	Part of at least 20 large caldera-forming eruptions in the San Juan volcanic field and surrounding area that formed around 26 to 35 Ma	
Uncompahgre—Dillon & Sapinero Mesa Tuffs	28.1	San Juan volcanic field	1,000	Part of at least 20 large caldera-forming eruptions in the San Juan volcanic field and surrounding area that formed around 26 to 35 Ma	
Platoro—Chiquito Peak tuff	28.2	San Juan volcanic field	1,000	Part of at least 20 large caldera-forming eruptions in the San Juan volcanic field and surrounding area that formed around 26 to 35 Ma	
Mount Princeton—Wall Mountain tuff	35.3	Thirtynine Mile volcanic area, Colorado	1,000	Helped cause the exceptional preservation at Florissant Fossil Beds National Monument	
Aira Caldera	0.03	Kyushu, Japan	940–1,040	Osumi pumice fall deposit, Ito ignimbrite, and Aira-Tanzawa ash fall deposit	

== Effusive eruptions ==
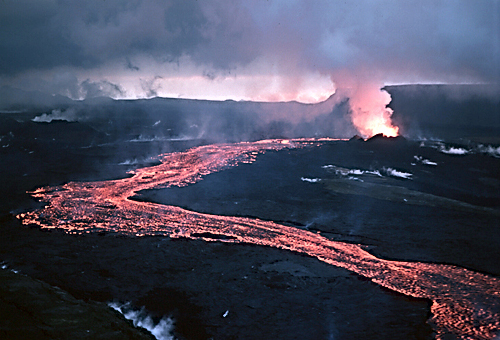
Effusive eruption of lava from Krafla, Iceland

Effusive eruptions involve a relatively gentle, steady outpouring of lava rather than large explosions. They can continue for years or decades, producing extensive fluid mafic lava flows. For example, Kīlauea on Hawaiʻi continuously erupted from 1983 to 2018, producing 2.7 km^{3} (1 cu mi) of lava covering more than 100 km^{2} (40 sq mi). Despite their ostensibly benign appearance, effusive eruptions can be as dangerous as explosive ones: one of the largest effusive eruptions in history occurred in Iceland during the 1783–1784 eruption of Laki, which produced about 15 km^{3} (4 cu mi) of lava and killed one fifth of Iceland's population. The ensuing disruptions to the climate may also have killed millions elsewhere. Still larger were the Icelandic eruptions of Katla (the Eldgjá eruption) circa 934, with 18 km^{3} (4 cu mi) of erupted lava, and the Þjórsárhraun eruption of Bárðarbunga circa 6700 BCE, with 25 km^{3} (6 cu mi) lava erupted, the latter being the largest effusive eruption in the last 10,000 years. The lava fields of these eruptions measure 565 km^{2} (Laki), 700 km^{2} (Eldgjá) and 950 km^{2} (Þjórsárhraun).

Eruption	Age (Millions of years)	Location	Volume (km^{3})	Notes	Refs
Mahabaleshwar–Rajahmundry Traps (Upper)	64.8	Deccan Traps, India	9,300		
Wapshilla Ridge flows	~15.5	Columbia River Basalt Group, United States	5,000–10,000	Member comprises 8–10 flows with a total volume of ~50,000 km^{3}	
McCoy Canyon flow	15.6	Columbia River Basalt Group, United States	4,300		
Umtanum flows	~15.6	Columbia River Basalt Group, United States	2,750	Two flows with a total volume of 5,500 km^{3}	
Sand Hollow flow	15.3	Columbia River Basalt Group, United States	2,660		
Pruitt Draw flow	16.5	Columbia River Basalt Group, United States	2,350		
Museum flow	15.6	Columbia River Basalt Group, United States	2,350		
Moonaree Dacite	1591	Gawler Range Volcanics, Australia	2,050	One of the oldest large eruptions preserved	
Rosalia flow	14.5	Columbia River Basalt Group, United States	1,900		
Joseph Creek flow	16.5	Columbia River Basalt Group, United States	1,850		
Ginkgo Basalt	15.3	Columbia River Basalt Group, United States	1,600		
California Creek–Airway Heights flow	15.6	Columbia River Basalt Group, United States	1,500		
Stember Creek flow	15.6	Columbia River Basalt Group, United States	1,200		

== Large igneous provinces ==
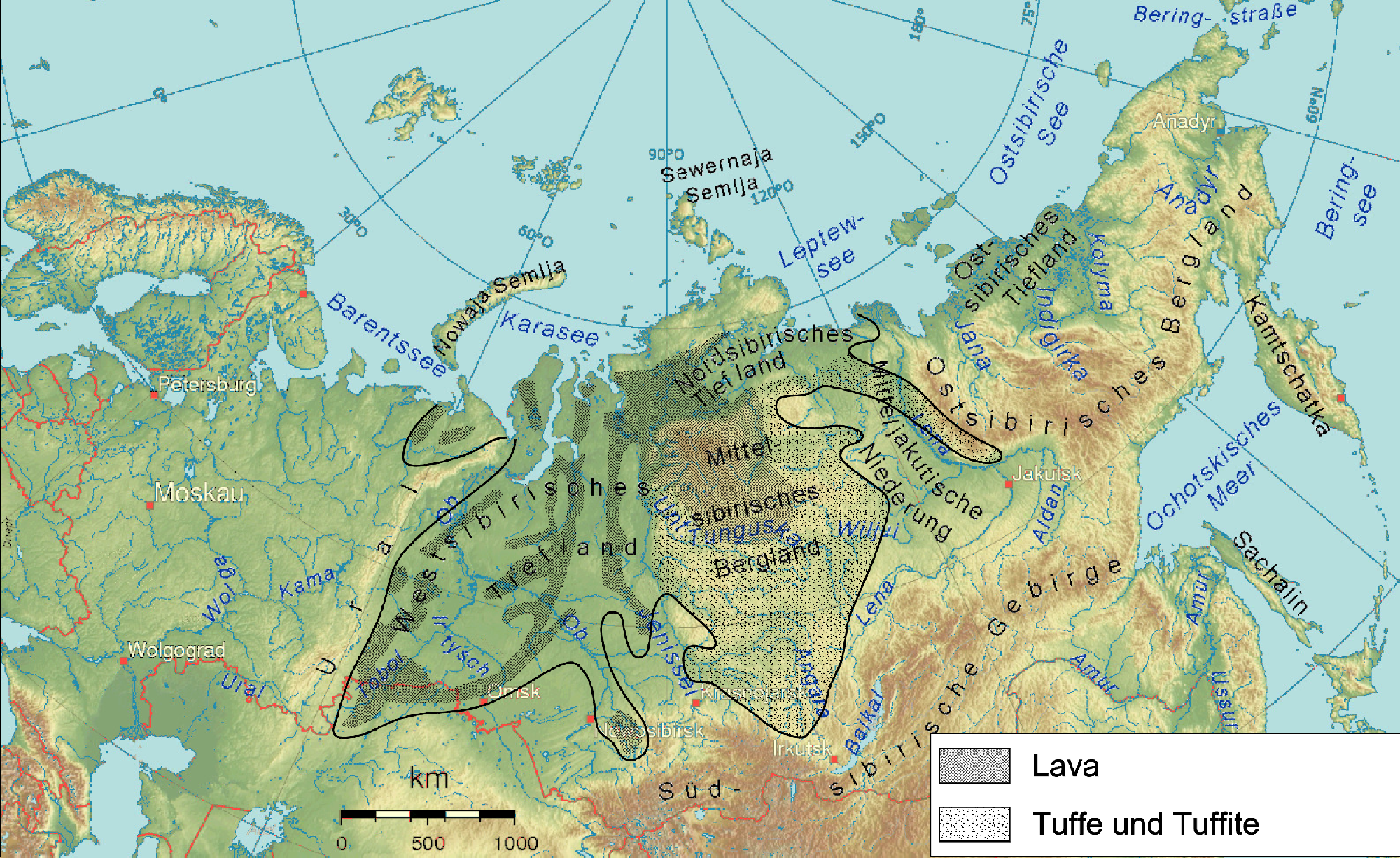
Extent of the Siberian Traps large igneous province (map in German)

Highly active periods of volcanism in what are called large igneous provinces have produced huge oceanic plateaus and flood basalts in the past. These can comprise hundreds of large eruptions, producing millions of km^{3} of lava in total. No large eruptions of flood basalts have occurred in human history, the most recent having occurred over 10 million years ago. They are often associated with breakup of supercontinents such as Pangea in the geologic record, and may have contributed to a number of mass extinctions. Most large igneous provinces have either not been studied thoroughly enough to establish the size of their component eruptions, or are not preserved well enough to make this possible. Many of the eruptions listed above thus come from just two large igneous provinces: the Paraná and Etendeka traps and the Columbia River Basalt Group. The latter is the most recent large igneous province, and also one of the smallest. A list of large igneous provinces follows to provide some indication of how many large eruptions may be missing from the lists given here.

Igneous province	Age (Millions of years)	Location	Volume (millions of km^{3})	Notes	Refs
Ontong Java–Manihiki–Hikurangi Plateau	121	Southwest Pacific Ocean	59–77 (Note: This is the volume of crustal thickening, so the figure includes intrusive as well as extrusive deposits.)	Largest igneous body on Earth, later split into three widely separated oceanic plateaus, with a fourth component perhaps now accreted onto South America. Possibly linked to the Louisville hotspot.	
Kerguelen Plateau–Broken Ridge	112	South Indian Ocean, Kerguelen Islands	17	Linked to the Kerguelen hotspot. Volume includes Broken Ridge and the Southern and Central Kerguelen Plateau (produced 120–95 Ma), but not the Northern Kerguelen Plateau (produced after 40 Ma).	
North Atlantic Igneous Province	55.5	North Atlantic Ocean	6.6 (Note: Actually several provinces, ranging in size from 1.5 to 6.6 million km^{3})	Linked to the Iceland hotspot.	
Mid-Tertiary ignimbrite flare-up	32.5	Southwest United States: mainly in Colorado, Nevada, Utah, and New Mexico	5.5	Mostly andesite to rhyolite explosive (500,000 km^{3}) to effusive (5 million km^{3}) eruptions, 25–40 Ma. Includes many volcanic centers, including the San Juan volcanic field	
Caribbean large igneous province	88	Caribbean–Colombian oceanic plateau	4	Linked to the Galápagos hotspot	
Siberian Traps	249.4	Siberia, Russia	1–4	A large outpouring of lava on land, believed to have caused the Permian–Triassic extinction event, the largest mass extinction ever	
Karoo-Ferrar	183	Mainly Southern Africa and Antarctica. Also South America, India, Australia and New Zealand	2.5	Formed as Gondwana broke up	
Paraná and Etendeka traps	133	Brazil/Angola and Namibia	2.3	Linked to the Tristan hotspot	
Central Atlantic magmatic province	200	Laurasia continents	2	Believed to be the cause of the Triassic–Jurassic extinction event. Formed as Pangaea broke up	
Deccan Traps	66	Deccan Plateau, India	1.5	A large igneous province of west-central India, believed to have been one of the causes of the Cretaceous–Paleogene extinction event. Linked to the Réunion hotspot	
Emeishan Traps	256.5	Southwestern China	1	Possible cause of Capitanian mass extinction event, later may have contributed to the Permian–Triassic extinction event along with Siberian Traps	
Coppermine River Group	1267	Mackenzie Large Igneous Province/Canadian Shield	0.65	Consists of at least 150 individual flows	
Ethiopia-Yemen Continental Flood Basalts	28.5	Ethiopia/Yemen/Afar, Arabian-Nubian Shield	0.35	Associated with silicic, explosive tuffs	
Columbia River Basalt Group	16	Pacific Northwest, United States	0.18	Well exposed by Missoula Floods in the Channeled Scablands	

== See also ==
- Extinction event
- List of flood basalt provinces
- List of large Holocene volcanic eruptions
- List of volcanic eruptions in Iceland
- List of impact structures on Earth
- Lists of earthquakes
- Supervolcano § Massive explosive eruptions
- Volcanic eruption
