= Pagosa Peak =

Mountain in Colorado, United States

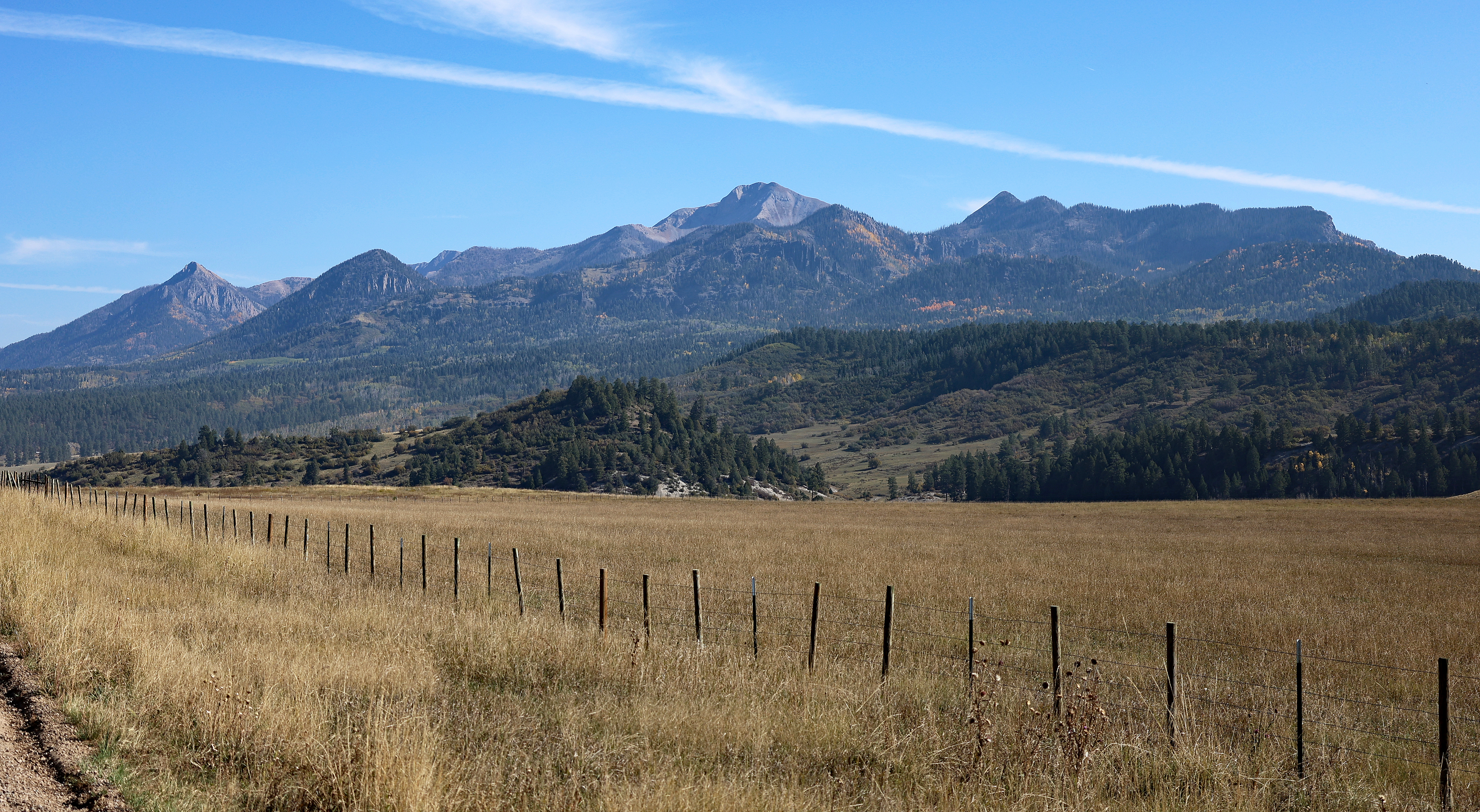
- The mountain (center) in October 2024

Highest point
- Elevation: 12,658 ft (3,858 m)
- Prominence: 1,021 ft (311 m)
- Isolation: 4.37 mi (7.03 km)
- Coordinates: 37°26′38.22″N 107°3′59.73″W

Geography
- Location within Colorado
- Country: United States
- State: Colorado
- County: Mineral
- National Forest: San Juan National Forest
- Wilderness Area: Weminuche Wilderness
- Parent range: San Juan Mountains of the Southern Rocky Mountains
- Topo map: USGS Pagosa Peak

Pagosa Peak, elevation 12,658 feet (3,858 meters), is a summit in the San Juan Mountains in Mineral County, Colorado, north of Pagosa Springs. The mountain lies in the Weminuche Wilderness and the San Juan National Forest. Pagosa Peak is visible from Pagosa Springs and serves as a landmark.

== Hiking ==
The climb to the top of the peak is difficult, as is accessing the trailhead, especially in a two-wheel drive vehicle. There is no official Forest Service trail to the peak, but a social trail has been formed by countless hikers. The unsigned trail is about four miles (6.4 kilometers) long with an elevation gain of around 2,500 feet (760 meters). Numerous fallen trees cross the path, which is not maintained. The trail is steep, navigation is difficult, and a false summit may cause confusion.

== Pagosa Peak Dacite ==
Pagosa Peak Dacite, a type of pyroclastic rock that originated in the La Garita Caldera, is named for the peak.
