= Calf Creek Plateau =

Mountain part of the San Juan Mountains, Rocky Mountains, North America

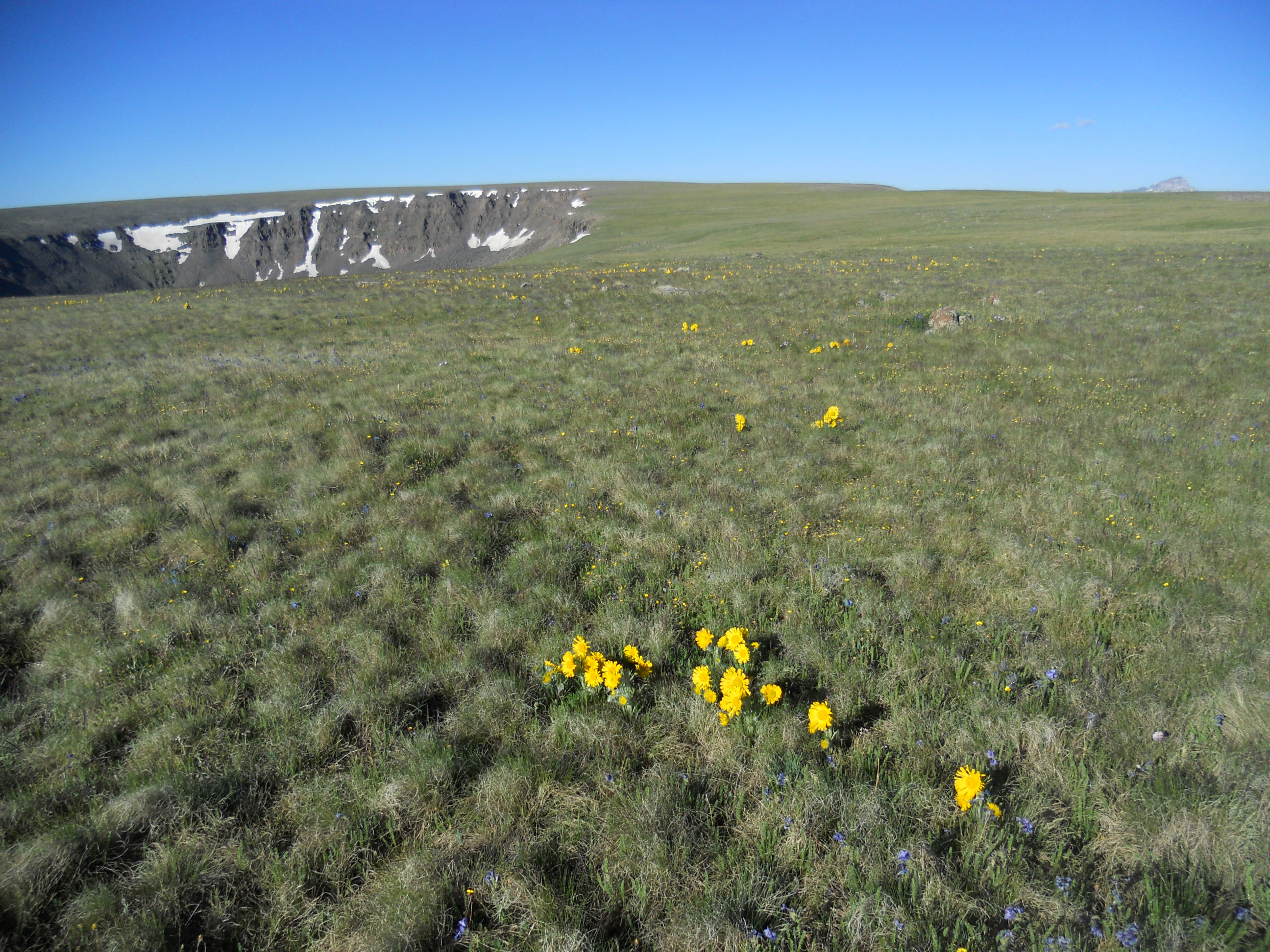
- Calf Creek Plateau viewed from the northeast.

Highest point
- Elevation: 12,661 ft (3,859 m)
- Prominence: 909 ft (277 m)
- Isolation: 6.45 mi (10.38 km)
- Coordinates: 38°07′35″N 107°12′26″W

Geography
- Location within Colorado
- Location: Hinsdale County, Colorado, U.S.
- Parent range: San Juan Mountains
- Topo map(s): USGS 7.5' topographic map Powderhorn Lakes

Calf Creek Plateau is a mountain in the northern San Juan Mountains of the Rocky Mountains of North America. The mountain is located in Hinsdale County, and at an elevation of 12,661 feet (3,859 m), it is the high point of the Powderhorn Wilderness.

== Geology ==
Calf Creek Plateau is within the San Juan volcanic field and volcanic rocks dominate the region. The mountain itself is composed of basaltic lava flows of the Hinsdale Formation, which are dated as 16 to 19 million years old. These lava flows are thought to be among the last volcanic events in the area and are some of the best preserved. The Hinsdale Formation lava flows form an expansive alpine highland where the two highest ridges are Calf Creek Plateau and nearby Cannibal Plateau. Calf Creek Plateau was glaciated, and the most prominent glacial cirques are located on the north side of the plateau. Powderhorn Lakes, a popular hiking destination, are located in one of these cirques.

== Hiking ==
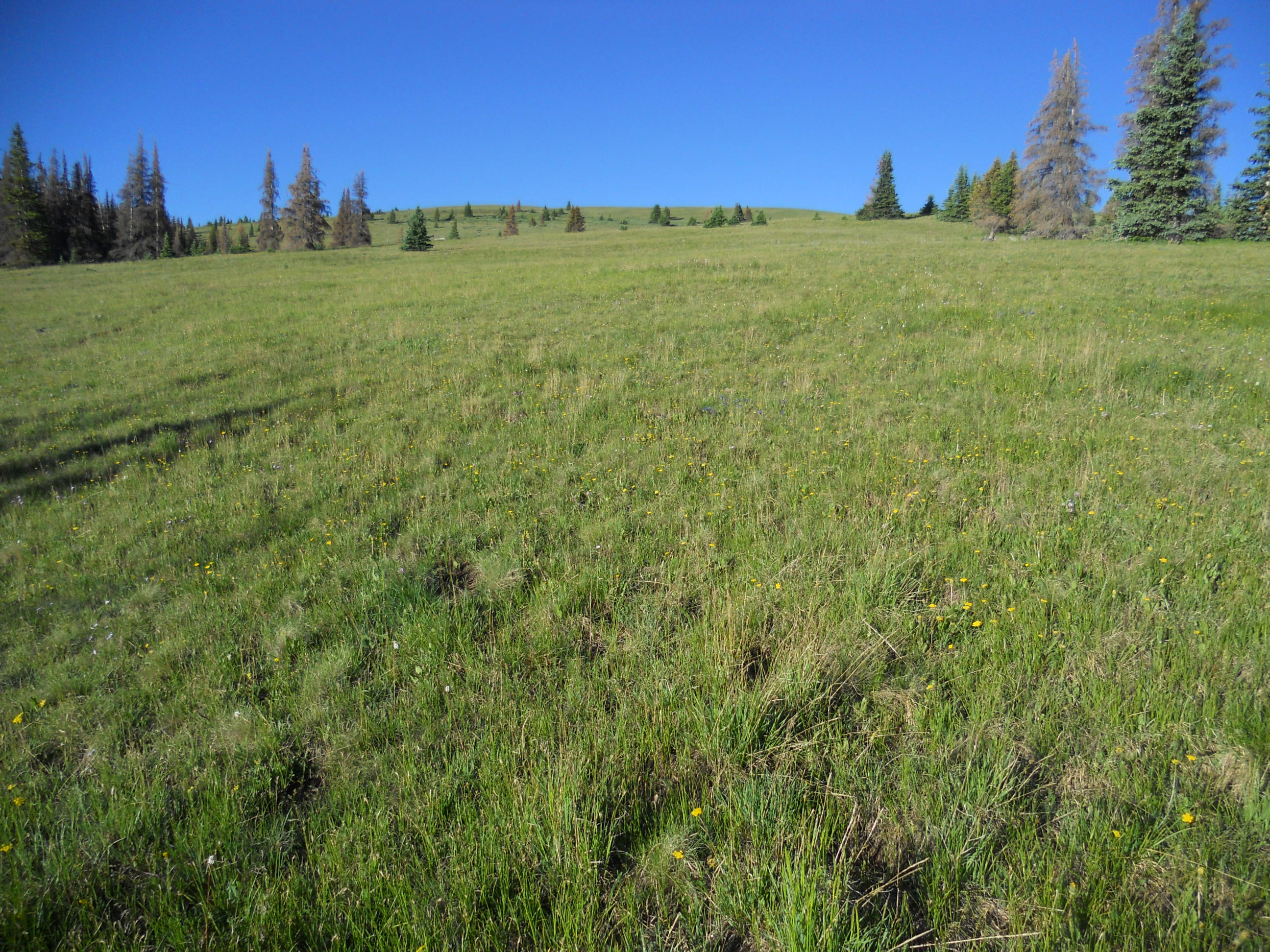
Northern approach to Calf Creek Plateau near timberline

The easiest route to the summit starts at the Powderhorn Lakes Trailhead located at the northern edge of the wilderness area. The Powderhorn Lakes Trail can be taken southwest 1.4 miles (2.3 km). At the large subalpine meadow where the trail turns southeast toward Powderhorn Lakes, leave the trail and continue 3.0 miles (4.8 km) up the ridge through meadows and eventually alpine tundra to the broad summit. The views along this alpine hike are expansive. The elevation gain on this route is 1,500 feet (457 m).

Calf Creek Plateau can also be reached from the Devil’s Creek Trailhead to the west and the Deer Lakes, Brush Creek, and Powderhorn Park trailheads to the south. All these routes begin in subalpine forests before emerging into the scenic alpine landscape of the Powderhorn Wilderness.
