= Slab window =

Type of gap in a subducted oceanic plate

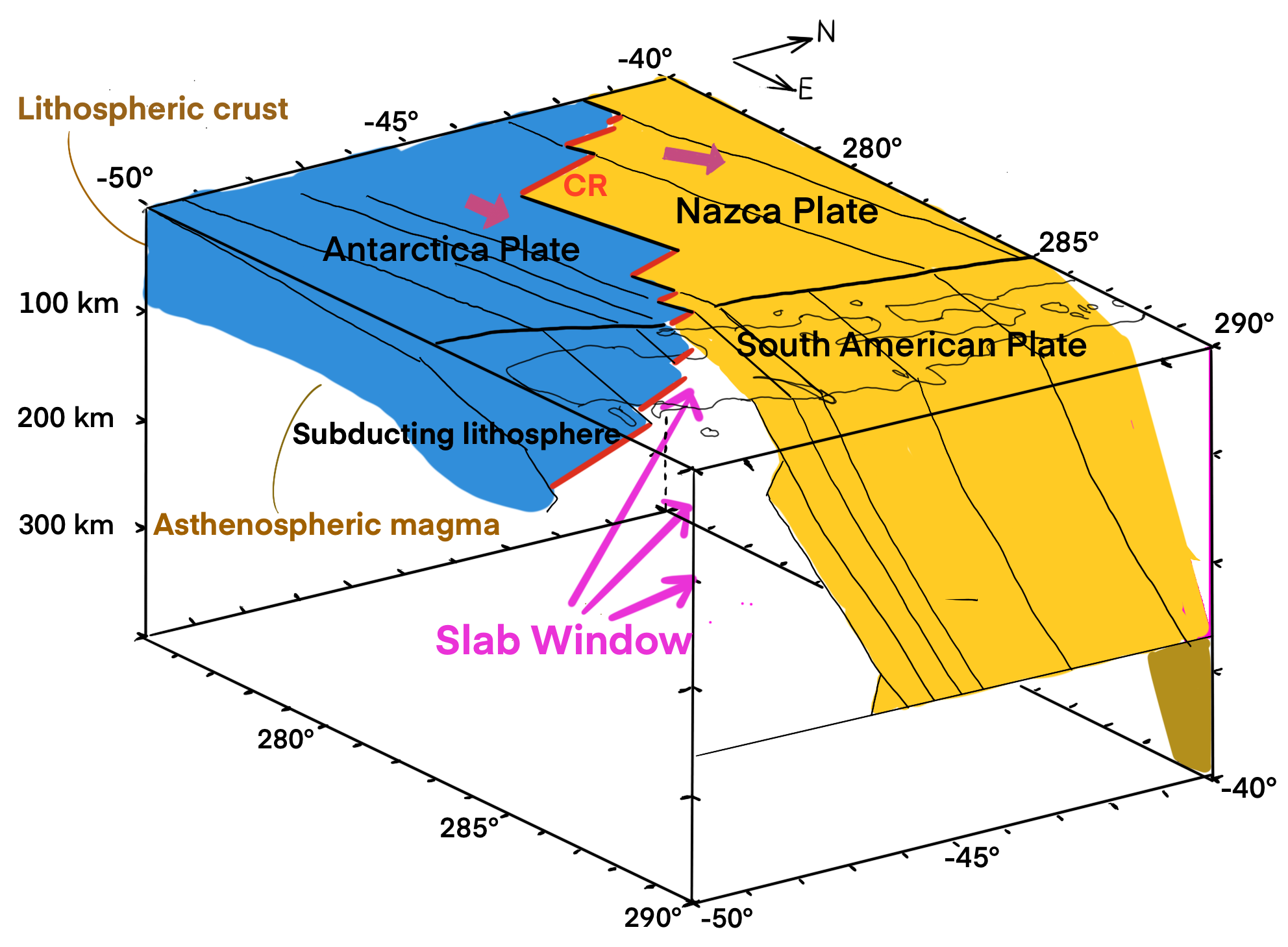
Diagram of a cross-section of the Patagonia slab window. The Nazca plate and Antarctic plate are colliding with the South American plate at the Chile Ridge.

In geology, a slab window or slab tear is a gap that forms in a subducted oceanic plate due to localization of stress in the subducting slab (i.e., the subducted oceanic plate). Several mechanisms may trigger the formation of a slab window. It can form when a mid-ocean ridge meets with a subduction zone and plate divergence at the ridge and convergence at the subduction zone continue, causing the ridge to be subducted. Another process that can initiate a slab window is the presence of an oceanic plate joint (i.e., pre-existing weakness in the plate that results from the intersection of two mid-ocean ridges) where the stress in the slab can be focused, leading the slab to break at depths. Formation of a slab window produces an area where the crust of the overriding plate is lacking a rigid lithospheric mantle component and thus is exposed to hot asthenospheric mantle (for a diagram of this, see the link below). This produces anomalous thermal, chemical and physical effects in the mantle that can dramatically change the overriding plate by interrupting the established tectonic and magmatic regimes. In general, the data used to identify possible slab windows comes from seismic tomography, heat flow studies, and geochemistry.

== Effects ==
As a slab window develops, the mantle in that region becomes increasingly hot and dry. The decrease in hydration causes arc volcanism to diminish or stop entirely, as magma production in subduction zones generally results from hydration of the mantle wedge due to de-watering of the subducting slab. Slab-window magmatism may then replace this melting, and can be produced by multiple processes, including increased temperatures, mantle circulation producing interaction of supra- and sub-slab mantle, partial melting of subducted slab edges and extension in the upper plate. Mantle flowing upward through the slab window in order to compensate for the decreased lithospheric volume can also produce decompression melting. Slab window melts are distinguished from calc-alkaline subduction-related magmas by their different chemical compositions. The increase in temperature caused by the presence of a slab window can also produce anomalous high temperature metamorphism in the region between the trench and the volcanic arc.

== Geometry ==
The geometry of a slab window depends primarily on the angle the triggering feature (ridge or oceanic plate joint) intersects the subduction zone and the dip angle of the down-going plate. Other influential factors include the rates of divergence and subduction as well as heterogeneities found within specific systems.

In the case of a slab window forming due to ridge subduction, there are two end-member scenarios in terms of the geometry of a slab window: the first is when the subducted ridge is perpendicular to the trench, producing a V-shaped window, and the second is when the ridge is parallel to the trench, causing a rectangular window to form.

== Examples ==
The North American Cordillera is a well-studied plate margin that provides a good example of the effects a slab window can have on an over-riding continental plate. Beginning in the Cenozoic, the fragmentation of the Farallon plate as it subducted caused slab windows to open, which then generated anomalous features in the North American plate. These effects include distinct fore-arc volcanism and extension in the plate which may be a contributing factor to the formation of the Basin and Range Province. The northward younging of Pemberton Belt volcanism in southwestern British Columbia, Canada, may have been related to a northward moving slab window edge under North America 29 to 6.8 million years ago.

In addition to the fossil slab windows of the Cenozoic seen in North America, there are other regions along the Pacific Rim (e.g. in California, Mexico, Costa Rica, Patagonia and the Antarctic Peninsula) that exhibit active ridge subduction producing slab windows.

The Caldas Tear in Colombia is another well-studied example of a slab window triggered by a more complex mechanism. There, one can observe a clear offset in the Wadati-Benioff zone which is thought to be caused by stress localization along an extinct spreading ridge (Sandra Ridge) from the collision of the Panama arc-indenter with northwestern South America.

An oceanic plate joint-induced slab window has been inferred by seismic tomography under the Alaska Peninsula around the volcanoes Aniakchak and Mount Veniaminof. The region in the vicinity of these volcanoes present anomalously large calderas and a lack of slab-like structure below 150 km depth. Other oceanic plate joints are present in the Pacific Ocean which might yield more examples of oceanic plate joint-induced slab windows in the future.

== See also ==
- Slab (geology) – The portion of a tectonic plate that is being subducted
- Slab gap hypothesis – Theory in plate tectonics
- Triple junction
