= Slab gap hypothesis =

Theory in plate tectonics

In geology, the slab gap hypothesis is one of the explanations put forward to explain several instances of crustal extension that occur inland near former subduction zones.

Standard plate tectonic theory holds that once a trench is closed by an overriding plate reaching a rift/spreading center, the plate that has just been fully consumed continues to descend beneath the overriding plate for some time, transmitting compressive pressures to the overriding plate above as well as occasional volcanism. Meanwhile, the descending plate leaves behind it a "window" of inactivity. In this view, there is no mantle upwelling, so once the crustal rift is overridden, the only residual effects are from the remnant descending plate slab. However, actual observations of the crust in western North America where the Farallon plate's trench and rift was snuffed out millions of years ago by the westward movement of the North American plate, and replaced by the San Andreas Fault, show not compression inland, but extension. This is most evident in the Great Basin where the continental crust and lithosphere as a whole is becoming increasingly thin. The crust here is also warming from below.

The slab gap hypothesis proposes that instead of a "window", the descending slab leaves behind a "gap" through which the asthenospheric mantle of the former spreading zone continues to act beneath the overriding plate. This hypothesis then assumes that a crustal spreading zone is also underpinned by a corresponding asthenospheric mantle spreading zone or upwelling of warmer material. The gap is created because instead of the old subducted plate continuing to sink, it quickly melts, allowing the asthenospheric upwelling zone to act directly on the underside of the overriding plate, heating it and causing it to spread apart. The fast melt is because the portion of the subducted plate nearest the spreading zone is thin and still warm from its recent creation.

The slab gap hypothesis goes on to state that the upwelling can form very deep cracks, which in turn lets very fluid basalt lava quickly spread over the land surface forming shield volcanoes and vast volcanic plains called "flood basalts". If, however, the extension is spread over a very large area then these flood basalt events may not occur.

This idea has been used to explain the extension and very large flood basalts that occurred in what is now southern Washington, Oregon and northern California about 17 million years ago (see Columbia River Plateau). Slab gap has also been used to help explain the earlier creation of the Basin and Range Province.

== See also ==
- Slab window – Type of gap in a subducted oceanic plate
