= Fish Canyon Tuff =

Lithostratigraphic unit

Fish Canyon Tuff eruption
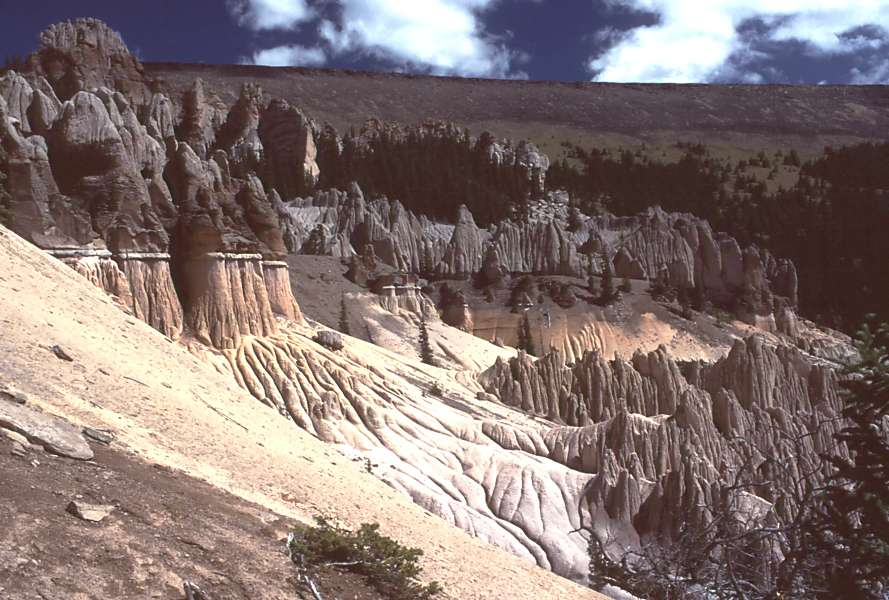
- The Fish Canyon Tuff ignimbrite
- Volcano: La Garita Caldera
- Date: About 28 million years ago
- Type: Ignimbrite Eruption
- Location: Colorado, United States; 37°45′23″N 106°56′03″W
- VEI: 8

The Fish Canyon Tuff is the large volcanic ash flow or ignimbrite deposit resulting from one of the largest known explosive eruptions on Earth, estimated at 1,200 cu mi (5,000 km^{3}) (see List of largest volcanic eruptions). The Fish Canyon Tuff eruption was centered at the La Garita Caldera in southwest Colorado; the caldera itself would have formed by collapse, as a result of the eruption. Studies of the tuff show that it all belongs to one eruption due to its uniform bulk-chemical composition (SiO_{2}=bulk 67.5–68.5% (dacite), matrix 75–76% (rhyolite) and consistent phenocryst content (35–50%) and mineralogical composition (plagioclase, sanidine, quartz, biotite, hornblende, sphene, apatite, zircon, Fe-Ti oxides are the primary phenocrysts). This tuff and eruption is part of the larger San Juan volcanic field and the Oligocene Southern Rocky Mountain ignimbrite flare-up.

The Fish Canyon Tuff eruption occurred around 28 Million years ago. Sanidine crystals from the Fish Canyon Tuff (FCTs) are used as a reference mineral in ^{40}Ar-^{39}Ar dating, and the current "astronomically calibrated" age for the FCTs is 28.175 Ma.

== See also ==
- List of large volume volcanic eruptions in the Basin and Range Province
