= La Garita Caldera =

Large caldera in Colorado, US

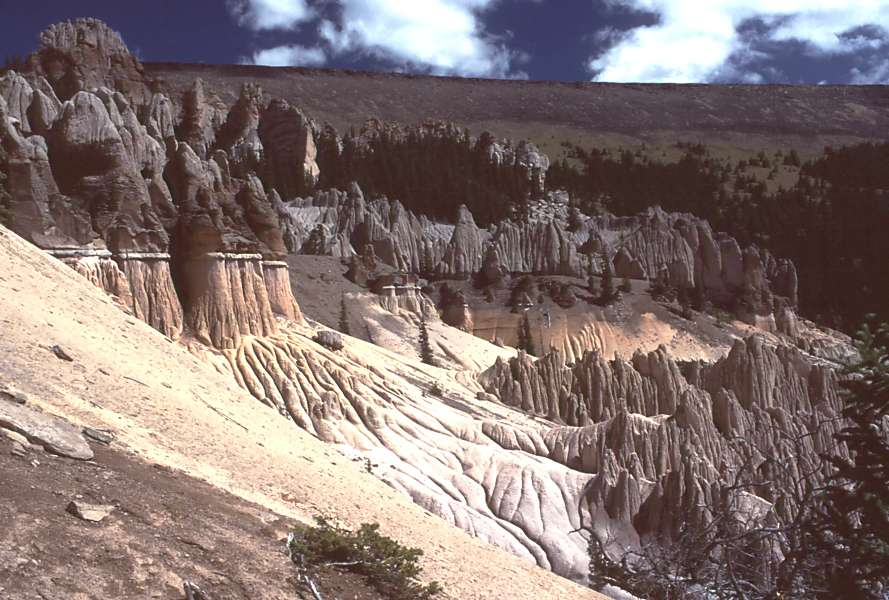
- Volcanic ash formations of La Garita Caldera, looking northeast (Wheeler Geologic Area)

Highest point
- Coordinates: 37°45′23″N 106°56′03″W

Geography
- Location within Colorado
- Location: Mineral County, Colorado, US, around Creede
- Parent range: San Juan Mountains

Geology
- Mountain type: Caldera
- Last eruption: 26.3 Ma (Fish Canyon Tuff 27.8 Ma)

La Garita Caldera is a large and extinct caldera in the San Juan volcanic field in the San Juan Mountains around the town of Creede in southwestern Colorado, United States. It is west of La Garita, Colorado. The eruption that created the La Garita Caldera is among the largest known volcanic eruptions in Earth's history, as well as being one of the most powerful known supervolcanic events.

== Date ==
The La Garita Caldera is one of a number of calderas that formed during a massive ignimbrite flare-up in Colorado, Utah, and Nevada from 40 to 18 million years ago, and was the site of massive eruptions about 28.01±0.04 million years ago, during the Oligocene Epoch.

== Area devastated ==
The area devastated by the La Garita eruption is thought to have covered a significant portion of what is now Colorado. The deposit, known as the Fish Canyon Tuff, covered at least 11,000 sq mi (28,000 km^{2}). Its average thickness is 330 ft (100 m). The eruption might have formed a large-area ash-fall, but none has yet been identified.

== Size of eruption ==
The scale of La Garita volcanism was the third greatest of the Cenozoic Era. The resulting Fish Canyon Tuff has a volume of approximately 1,200 cubic miles (5,000 km^{3}), giving it a volcanic explosivity index rating of 8. By comparison, the eruption of Mount St. Helens on May 18, 1980, was 0.25 cubic miles (1.0 km^{3}) in volume. By contrast, the most powerful human-made explosive device ever detonated, the Tsar Bomba, had a yield of 50 megatons, whereas the eruption at La Garita was about 5,000 times more energetic.

The Fish Canyon eruption was the second most energetic event to have occurred on Earth since the Cretaceous–Paleogene extinction event 66 million years ago. The asteroid impact responsible for that mass-extinction, equivalent to 100 teratons of TNT, was approximately 420 times more powerful than the Fish Canyon eruption.

== Geology ==
The Fish Canyon Tuff, made of dacite, is uniform in its petrological composition and forms a single cooling unit despite the huge volume. Dacite is a silicic volcanic rock common in explosive eruptions, lava domes and short thick lava flows. There are also large intracaldera lavas composed of andesite, a volcanic rock compositionally intermediate between basalt (poor in silica content) and dacite (higher silica content) in the La Garita Caldera.

The caldera itself, like the eruption of Fish Canyon Tuff, is large. It is oblong, 22 by 47 miles (35 by 75 km). Many calderas of explosive origin are slightly ovoid or oblong. Because of the vast scale and erosion, it took scientists over 30 years to fully determine the size of the caldera. La Garita is considered an extinct volcano.

La Garita is also the source of at least seven major eruptions of welded tuff deposits over a span of 1.5 million years since the Fish Canyon Tuff eruption. The caldera is also known to have extensive outcrops of a very unusual lava-like rock unit, called the Pagosa Peak Dacite, made of dacite that is very similar to that of the Fish Canyon Tuff. The Pagosa Peak Dacite, which has characteristics of both lava and welded tuff, likely erupted shortly before the Fish Canyon Tuff. The Pagosa Peak Dacite has been interpreted as having erupted during low-energy pyroclastic fountaining and has a volume of about 50–70 cubic miles (200–300 km^{3}). These rocks were identified as lava because the unit has a highly elongated shape (1:50) and very high viscosity of the crystal-rich magma similar to those of flow-layered silicic lava. The Pagosa Peak Dacite formed by low-column pyroclastic fountaining and lateral transport as dense, poorly-inflated pyroclastic flows.

== See also ==
- List of largest volcanic eruptions
- Wheeler Geologic Area
- Yellowstone Caldera
- Toba Supereruption
