= Dacite =

Volcanic rock intermediate in composition between andesite and rhyolite

- Igneous rock
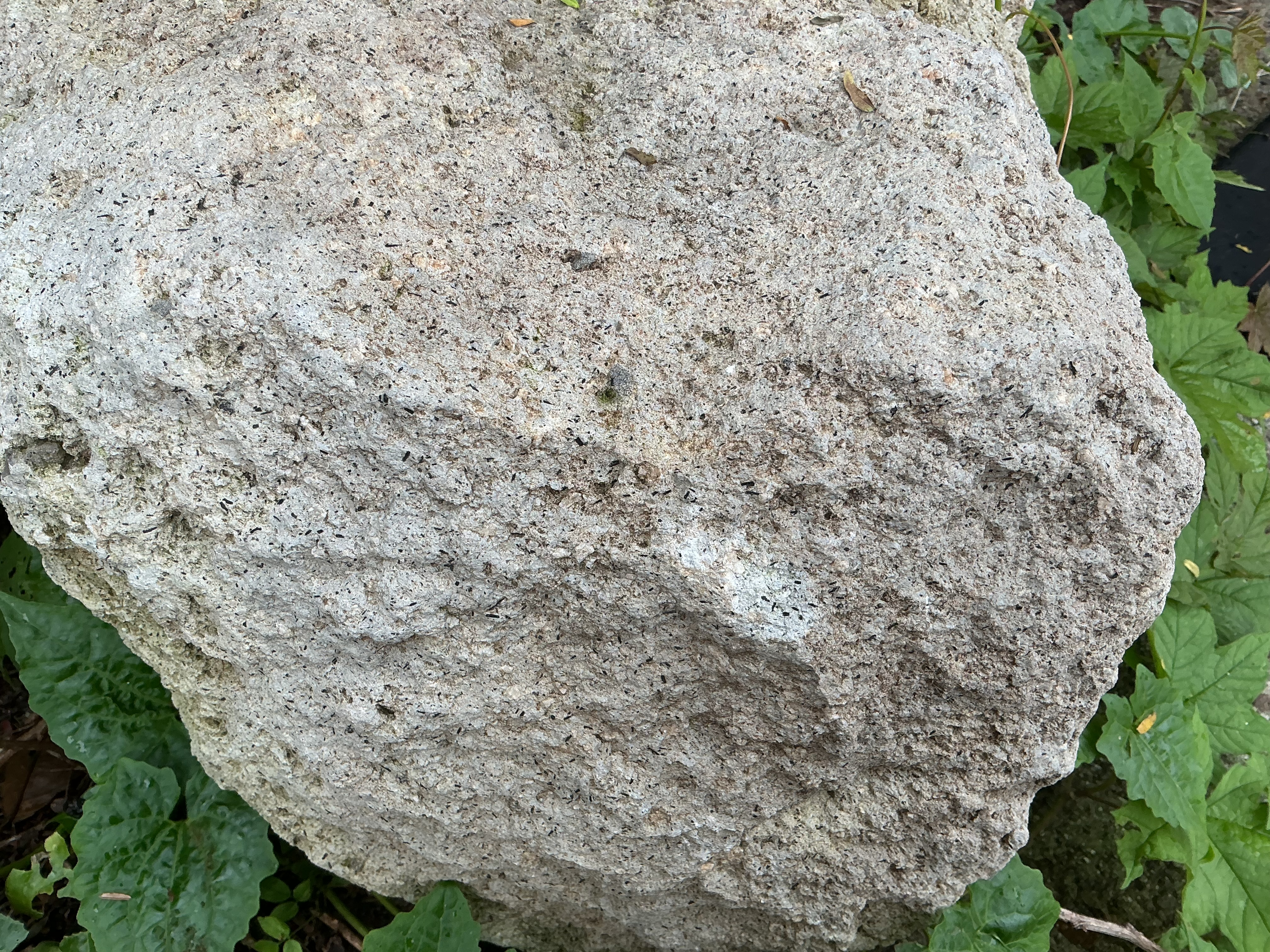
- Dacite from the Mt. Bijang lava dome, Laguna Volcanic Field, Philippines.

Composition
- Classification: Felsic
- Primary: Plagioclase feldspar, quartz
- Secondary: Hornblende, potassium feldspar, biotite, augite, enstatite, volcanic glass
- Texture: Aphanitic or porphyritic
- Equivalents: Intrusive variant is granodiorite if it contains 10% to 35% potassium feldspar or tonalite if it contains less than 10% potassium feldspar relative to the total feldspar content.

Dacite (/ˈdeɪsaɪt/) is a volcanic rock formed by rapid solidification of lava that is high in silica and low in alkali metal oxides. It has a fine-grained (aphanitic) to porphyritic texture and is intermediate in composition between andesite and rhyolite. It is composed predominantly of plagioclase feldspar and quartz.

Dacite is relatively common, occurring in many tectonic settings. It is associated with andesite and rhyolite as part of the subalkaline tholeiitic and calc-alkaline magma series.

== Etymology ==
The word dacite comes from Dacia, a province of the Roman Empire which lay between the Danube River and Carpathian Mountains (now modern Romania and Moldova) where the rock was first described.

The term dacite was used for the first time in the scientific literature in the book Geologie Siebenbürgens (The Geology of Transylvania) by Austrian geologists Franz Ritter von Hauer and Guido Stache. Dacite was originally defined as a new rock type to separate calc-alkaline rocks with oligoclase phenocrysts (dacites) from rocks with orthoclase phenocrysts (rhyolites).

== Composition ==
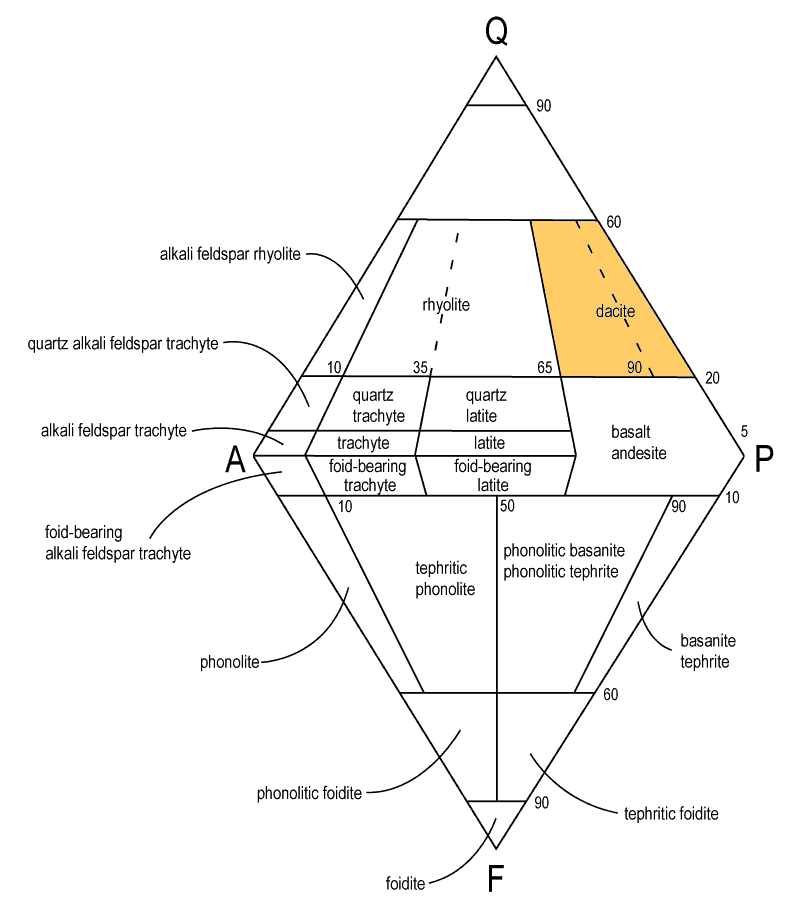
Aphanitic QAPF diagram denoting dacite

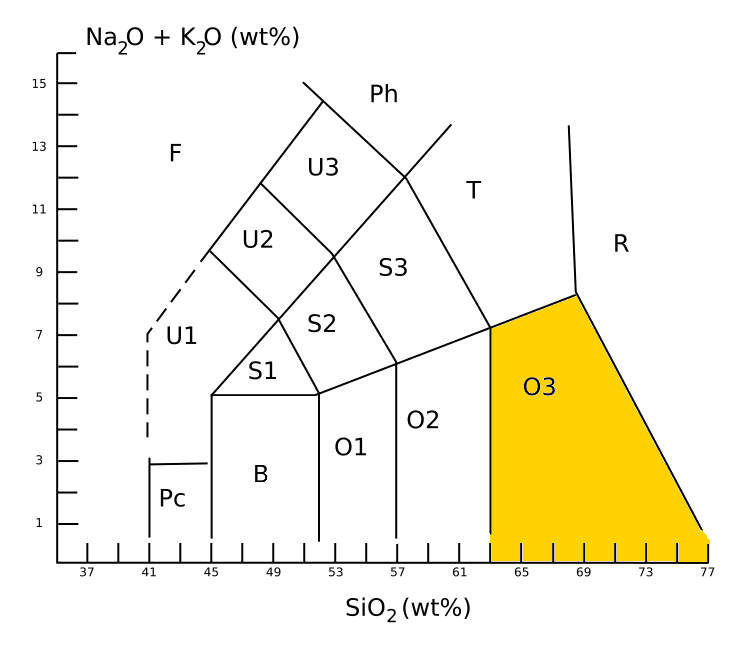
TAS diagram with the dacite (O3) field highlighted in yellow

Dacite consists mostly of plagioclase feldspar and quartz with biotite, hornblende, and pyroxene (augite or enstatite). The quartz appears as rounded, corroded phenocrysts, or as an element of the ground-mass. The plagioclase in dacite ranges from oligoclase to andesine and labradorite. Sanidine occurs, although in small proportions, in some dacites, and when abundant gives rise to rocks that form transitions to the rhyolites.

The relative proportions of feldspars and quartz in dacite, and in many other volcanic rocks, are illustrated in the QAPF diagram. This defines dacite as having a content of 20% to 60% quartz, with plagioclase making up 65% or more of its feldspar content. However, while the IUGS recommends classifying volcanic rocks on the basis of their mineral composition whenever possible, dacites are often so fine-grained that mineral identification is impractical. The rock must then be classified chemically based on its content of silica and alkali metal oxides (K_{2}O plus Na_{2}O). The TAS classification puts dacite in the O3 sector.

== Texture ==
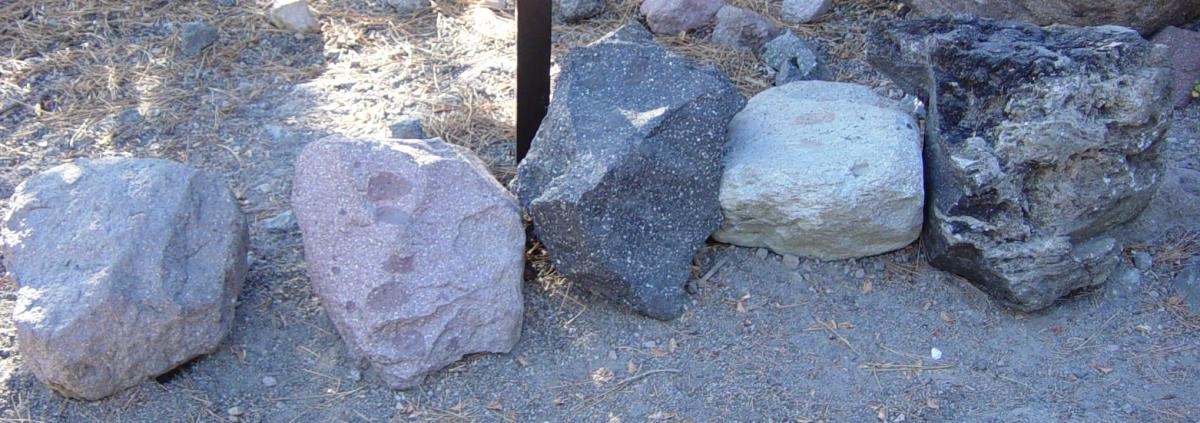
Grey, red, black, altered white/tan, flow-banded pumice dacite

In hand specimen, many of the hornblende and biotite dacites are grey or pale brown and yellow rocks with white feldspars, and black crystals of biotite and hornblende. Other dacites, especially pyroxene-bearing dacites, are darker colored.

In thin section, dacites may have an aphanitic to porphyritic texture. Porphyritic dacites contain blocky highly zoned plagioclase phenocrysts and/or rounded corroded quartz phenocrysts. Subhedral hornblende and elongated biotite grains are present. Sanidine phenocrysts and augite (or enstatite) are found in some samples. The groundmass of these rocks is often aphanitic microcrystalline, with a web of minute feldspars mixed with interstitial grains of quartz or tridymite; but in many dacites it is largely vitreous, while in others it is felsitic or cryptocrystalline.

== Geological context and formation ==
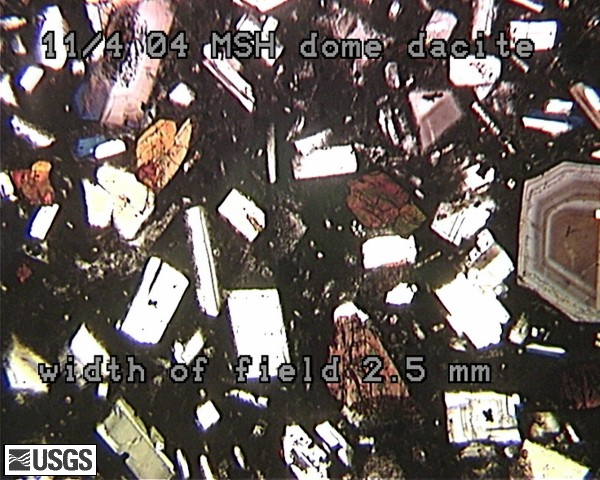
Thin section of a porphyritic dacite from Mount St. Helens

Dacite usually forms as an intrusive rock such as a dike or sill. Examples of this type of dacite outcrop are found in northwestern Montana and northeastern Bulgaria. Nevertheless, because of the moderately high silica content, dacitic magma is quite viscous and therefore prone to explosive eruption. A notorious example of this is Mount St. Helens in which dacite domes formed from previous eruptions. Pyroclastic flows may also be of dacitic composition as is the case with the Fish Canyon Tuff of La Garita Caldera.

Dacitic magma is formed by the subduction of young oceanic crust under a thick felsic continental plate. Oceanic crust is hydrothermally altered causing addition of quartz and sodium. As the young, hot oceanic plate is subducted under continental crust, the subducted slab partially melts and interacts with the upper mantle through convection and dehydration reactions. The process of subduction creates metamorphism in the subducting slab. When this slab reaches the mantle and initiates the dehydration reactions, minerals such as talc, serpentine, mica and amphiboles break down generating a more sodic melt. The magma then continues to migrate upwards causing differentiation and becomes even more sodic and silicic as it rises. Once at the cold surface, the sodium rich magma crystallizes plagioclase, quartz and hornblende. Accessory minerals like pyroxenes provide insight to the history of the magma.

The formation of dacite provides a great deal of information about the connection between oceanic crust and continental crust. It provides a model for the generation of felsic, buoyant, perennial rock from a mafic, dense, short-lived one.

=== Dacite's role in the formation of Archean continental crust ===
The process by which dacite forms has been used to explain the generation of continental crust during the Archean eon. At that time, the production of dacitic magma was more ubiquitous, due to the availability of young, hot oceanic crust. Today, the colder oceanic crust that subducts under most plates is not able to melt prior to the dehydration reactions, thus inhibiting the process.

=== Molten dacite magma at Kīlauea ===
Dacitic magma was encountered in a drillhole during geothermal exploration on Kīlauea in 2005. At a depth of 2488 m, the magma flowed up the wellbore. This produced several kilograms of clear, colorless vitric (glassy, non-crystalline) cuttings at the surface. The dacite magma is a residual melt of the typical basalt magma of Kīlauea.

== Distribution ==
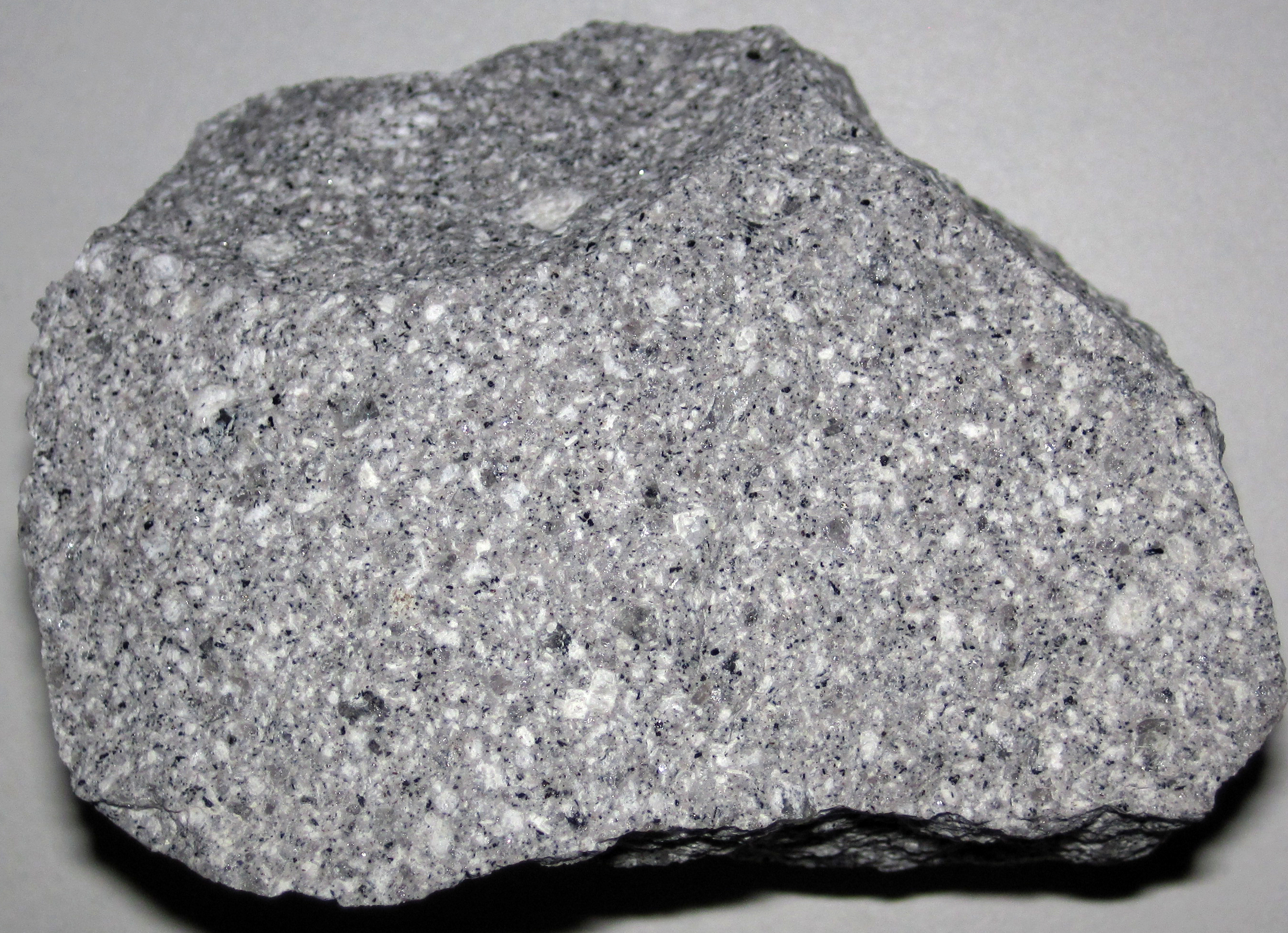
Dacite sample from Mt. General, San Bernardino County

Dacite is relatively common and occurs in various tectonic and magmatic contexts:

- In oceanic volcanic series. Examples: Iceland (Heiðarsporður ridge), Juan de Fuca Ridge.
- In calc-alkaline and tholeiitic volcanic series of the subduction zones of island arcs and active continental margins. Examples of dacitic magmatism in island arcs are Japan, the Philippines, the Aleutians, the Antilles, the Sunda Arc (Mount Batur), Tonga and the South Sandwich Islands. Examples of dacitic magmatism in active continental margins are the Cascade Range, Guatemala and the Andes (Ecuador, Peru and Chile).
- In continental volcanic series, often in association with tholeiitic basalts and intermediary rocks

The type locality of dacite is Gizella quarry near Poieni, Cluj in Romania. Other occurrences of dacite in Europe are Germany (Weiselberg), Greece (Nisyros and Thera), Italy (in Bozen quartz porphyry, and Sardinia), Austria (Styrian Volcano Arc), Scotland (Argyll), Slovakia, Spain (El Hoyazo near Almería), France (Massif de l'Esterel) and Hungary (Csódi Hill).

Sites outside Europe include Iran, Morocco, New Zealand (volcanic region of Taupo), Turkey, United States and Zambia.

High-silica, high-potassium calc-alkaline dacites with a geochemical signature similar to that of dacites with continental crust contamination have also been seen in the Laguna Volcanic Field in the Philippines, where they have occurred due to a combination of intracrustal partial melting and extreme differentiation of pre-existing, mantle derived underplated magmas. Examples of domes from oldest to youngest are Bijang, Calamba, Turupiche, San Antonio, Olila and Bulalo.

Dacite is found extraterrestrially at Nili Patera caldera of Syrtis Major Planum on Mars.

== See also ==
- Lassen Volcanic National Park
- Potosí, Bolivia
