= San Juan volcanic field =

Volcanic field in southwestern Colorado, United States

- Location within Colorado

Highest point
- Coordinates: 37°53′36″N 106°46′28″W

Geography
- Location: Colorado, United States

Geology
- Mountain type: Volcanic field

The San Juan volcanic field is part of the San Juan Mountains in southwestern Colorado. It consists mainly of volcanic rocks that form the largest remnant of a major composite volcanic field that covered most of the southern Rocky Mountains in the Middle Tertiary geologic time. There are approximately fifteen calderas known in the San Juan Volcanic Fields; however, it is possible that there are two or even three more in the region.

The region began with many composite volcanoes that became active between 35 and 40 million years ago, with peak activity in the time period around 35-30 million years ago. Around this time the activity began to include explosive ash-flow eruptions. Many of these volcanoes experienced caldera collapse, resulting in the fifteen to eighteen caldera volcanoes in the region today.

== Phases of Volcanism ==
The San Juan volcanic field experienced two phases of volcanism.

The earlier volcanism took place during the Oligocene age of the Paleogene Period. It produced largely intermediate composition lavas and breccias, together with ash flow tuffs reflecting differentiation of the original magma. The precaldera intermediate volcanic rocks include the Conejos Formation in the southeastern part of the field. Intermediate volcanism did not cease with caldera eruptions, and included such voluminous intermediate volcanic rocks as the Huerto Andesite.

The later volcanism took place from Miocene to Pliocene in ages of the Neogene Period. It was characterized by bimodal volcanism, producing both low-silica alkaline flows and high-silica rhyolites. It is usually interpreted as a partial melt of the lower crust that was erupted onto the surface.

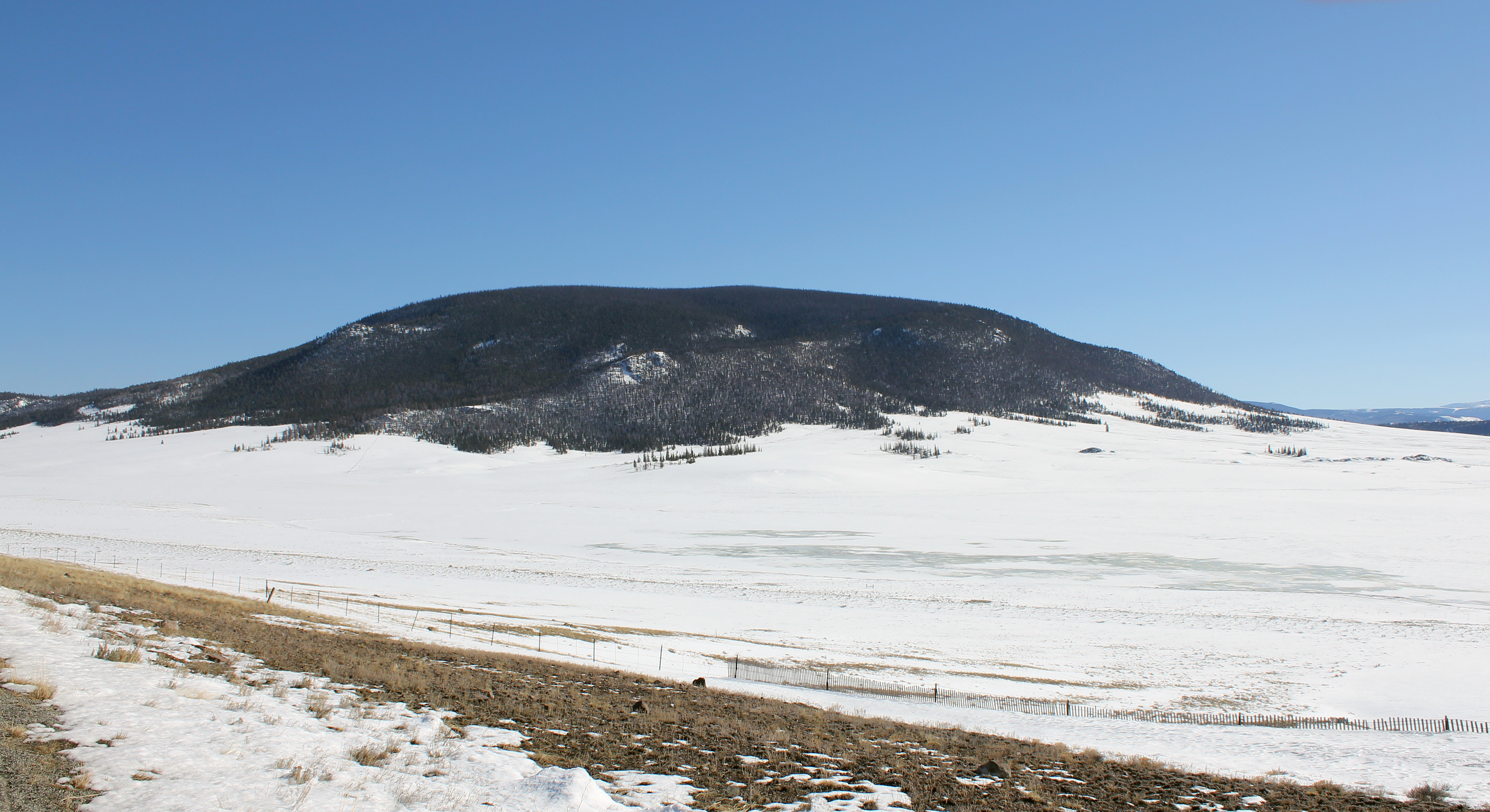
Cochetopa Dome (Cochetopa Caldera).

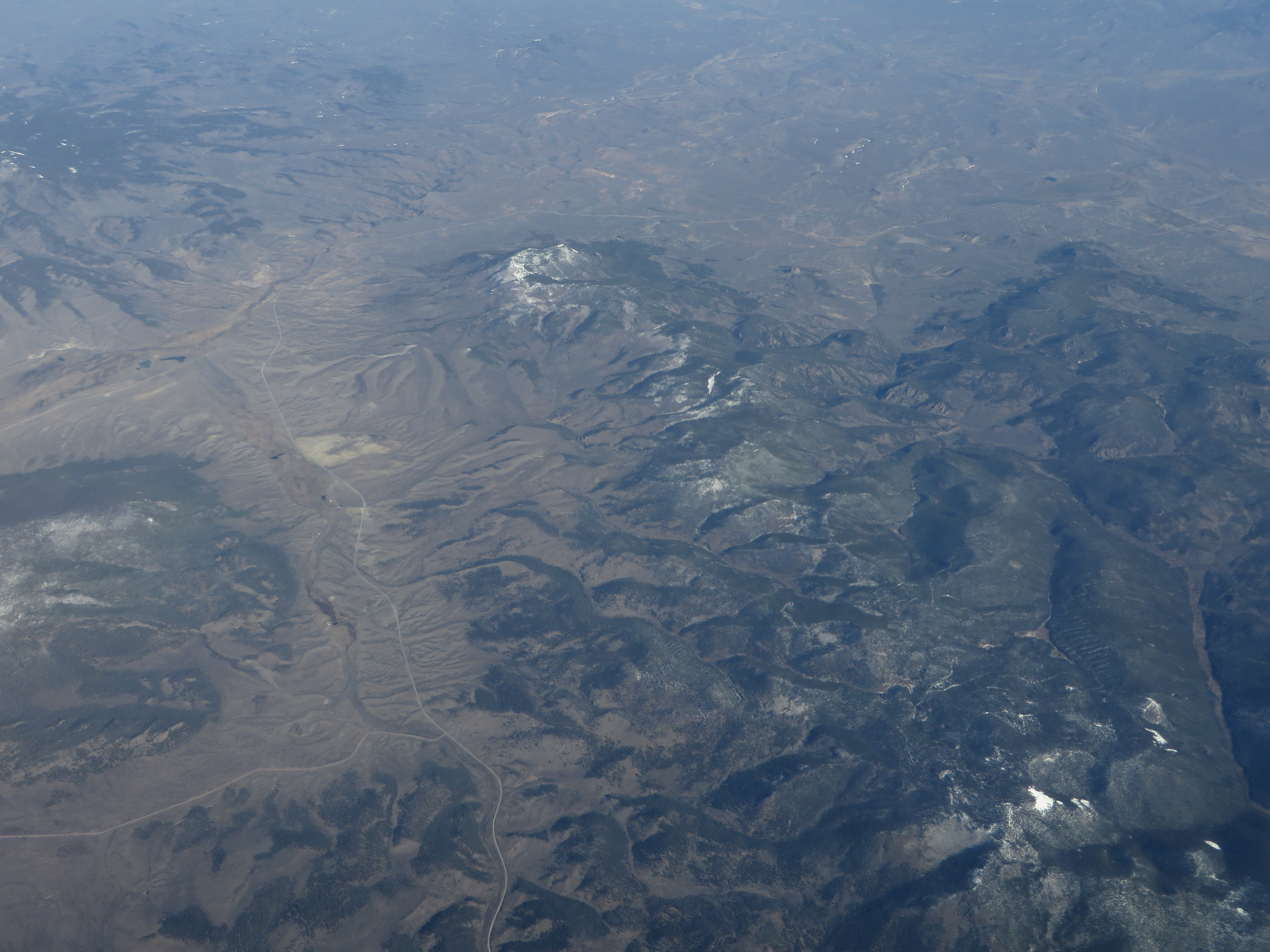
Aerial of Colorado State Highway 114 near Cochetopa Dome and Cochetopa Hills.

== Notable calderas ==
Name	Associated tuff	Coordinates	Age
Lake City	Sunshine Peak Tuff	38°02′N 107°23′W	22.93 ± 0.02 Ma
Creede Caldera	Snowshoe Mountain Tuff	37°46′N 106°56′W	26.5 ± 0.3 Ma
Cochetopa	Nelson Mountain Tuff	38°12′N 106°45′W	26.4 ± 0.5 Ma
San Luis	Cebolla Creek Tuff; Rat Creek Tuff	38°01′N 107°58′W	26.9 Ma
South River	Watson Park Tuff	37°40′N 106°56′W	27.4? Ma
Bachelor	Carpenter Ridge Tuff	37°49′N 106°55′W	27.45 ± 0.05 Ma
La Garita	Fish Canyon Tuff	37°46′N 106°56′W	27.45 ± 0.05 Ma
Uncompahgre-San Juan	Sapinero Mesa Tuff	37°58′N 107°32′W	27.5 ± 0.5 Ma
Platoro	Treasure Mountain Group	37°21′N 106°32′W	28.4 Ma
Unknown	Masonic Park Tuff	37°42′N 106°41′W	28.7 Ma
North Pass	Saguache Creek Tuff	38°12′N 106°32′W	32.2 Ma
Bonanza	Bonanza Tuff	38°19′N 106°05′W	33.12 ± 0.03 Ma
Marshall	Thorn Ranch Tuff	38°20′N 106°14′W	33.6 ± 0.3 Ma

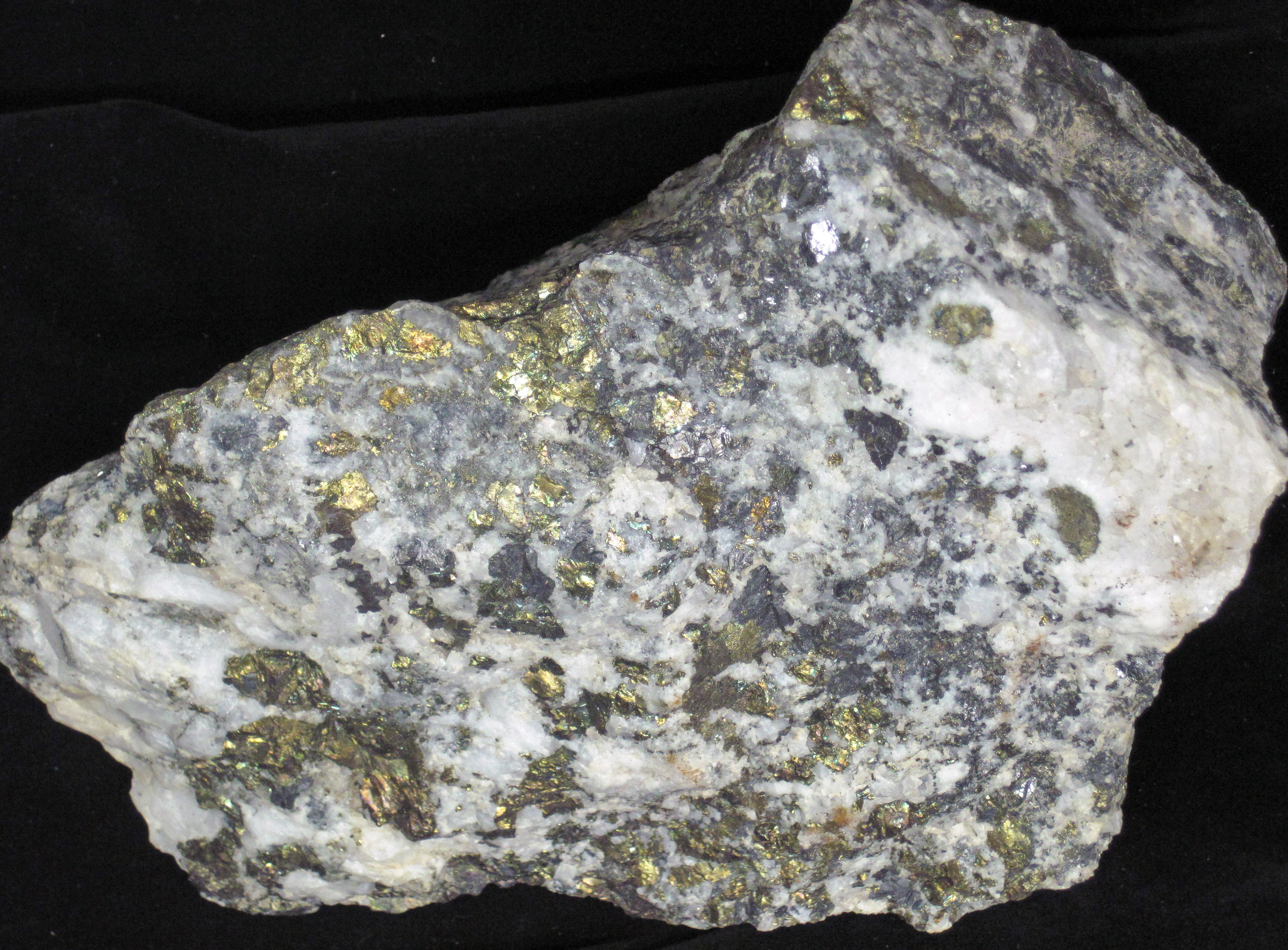
Chalcopyrite−quartz rock specimen, from Idarado Mine in San Juan Volcanic Field.

== Economic impact ==
The San Juan volcanic field has been a historically important mining district, producing lead, zinc, copper, gold, and silver. The ores were mostly deposited in and near calderas that experienced significant postcaldera activity. Ore veins were concentrated in fractures associated with caldera activity and in postcaldera intrusive bodies. The greatest mineralization took place near the youngest and most silicic intrusions of each caldera cycle.

== See also ==
- List of large volume volcanic eruptions in the Basin and Range Province
- San Juan Mountains (Colorado)
- Volcanic fields of Colorado
- List of volcanic fields
