= Cochetopa Hills =

Mountain range in Colorado, US

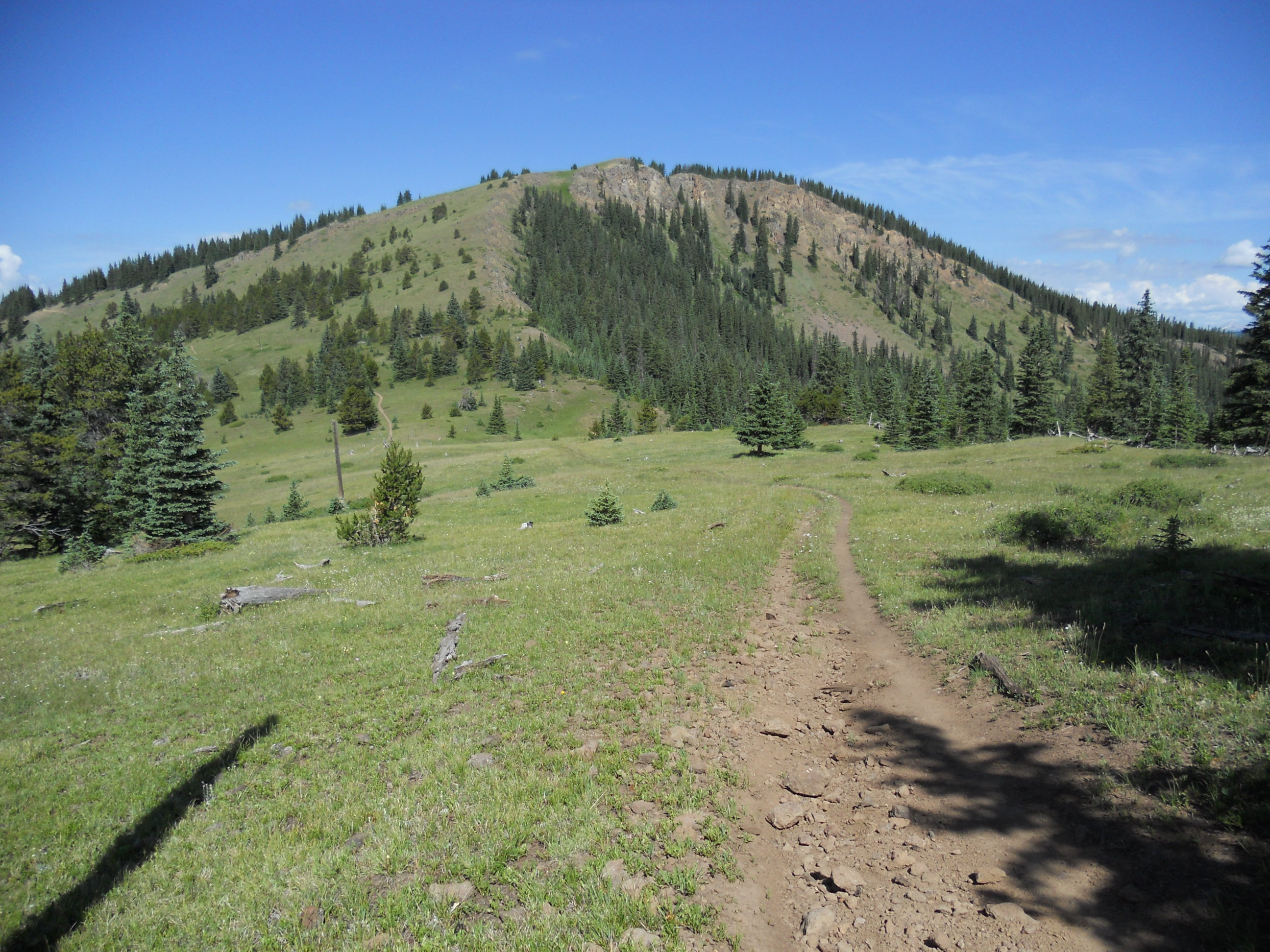
- Windy Peak along the Continental Divide in the Cochetopa Hills

Highest point
- Peak: Long Branch Baldy
- Elevation: 11,974 ft (3,650 m)
- Coordinates: 38°19′20″N 106°28′26″W

Geography
- Location within Colorado
- Country: United States
- State: Colorado
- County: Saguache
- Parent range: San Juan Mountains, Rocky Mountains

The Cochetopa Hills (Note: Pronounced /koʊtʃɪˈtoʊpə/ or sometimes locally /koʊtʃɪˈtoʊp/.) are a mountain range on the Continental Divide in Saguache County, Colorado, United States. The Cochetopa Hills are a sub-range of the San Juan Mountains and are located in the Gunnison National Forest and Rio Grande National Forest. The range extends from Marshall Pass southwest 50 miles (80 km) along the winding crest of the divide to Saguache Park. The high point of the Cochetopa Hills is Long Branch Baldy at an elevation of 11,974 feet (3,650 m).

The Cochetopa Hills form a notable low-elevation span along the Continental Divide in southern Colorado. The peaks in the adjacent Sawatch Range to the northeast and the San Juan Mountains to the southwest are higher with elevations over 13,000 feet (3,962 m). Within the Cochetopa Hills are Cochetopa Pass (elevation 10,067 feet (3,068 m)) and North Pass (elevation 10,135 feet (3,089 m), which were historically important routes across the divide for Native Americans. Cochetopa is the Ute word for "gate of buffaloes." Today, the Cochetopa Hills are traversed by one paved road, Colorado Highway 114, which crosses the divide at North Pass.

== Geology ==
The Cochetopa Hills are dominated by Tertiary volcanic rocks, including lavas, ash flow tuffs, and breccias. These materials originated from over a dozen volcanoes and multiple eruptions in the San Juan volcanic field. The rocks exposed today are from eruptions 35 million years ago to 26 million years ago.

After major eruptions emptied the magma chamber below these volcanoes, the overlying rock could collapse and produce a sunken crater called a caldera. Evidence of such calderas are found throughout the San Juan Volcanic Field, including where the Cochetopa Hills occur today. One of the earliest of these volcanoes was the North Pass Caldera, which was active 33 million years ago. Through time, the caldera filled with additional volcanic material ejected from other volcanoes, and subsequently erosion reshaped the landscape making the ancient caldera now difficult to detect. However, just to the north of the Cochetopa Hills is the Cochetopa Caldera, a younger collapsed volcano which was active 27 million years ago. This caldera is better preserved with the rhyolitic Cochetopa Dome rising from the caldera center. Today, the Cochetopa Hills mark the southern rim of the Cochetopa Caldera.

Evidence of glaciation is present at the highest elevations of the Cochetopa Hills. Glacial cirques are located on the northeast and eastern sides of Long Branch Baldy where tarns and glacial deposits are found.

== Climate ==
The Cochetopa Hills' climate is classified as a subarctic climate (Dfc) in the Köppen system, with cold, snowy winters and cool summers. It receives precipitation as snow in winter and as thunderstorms in summer, with June typically being a drier month.
