= Long Branch Baldy =

Mountain in Colorado, United States

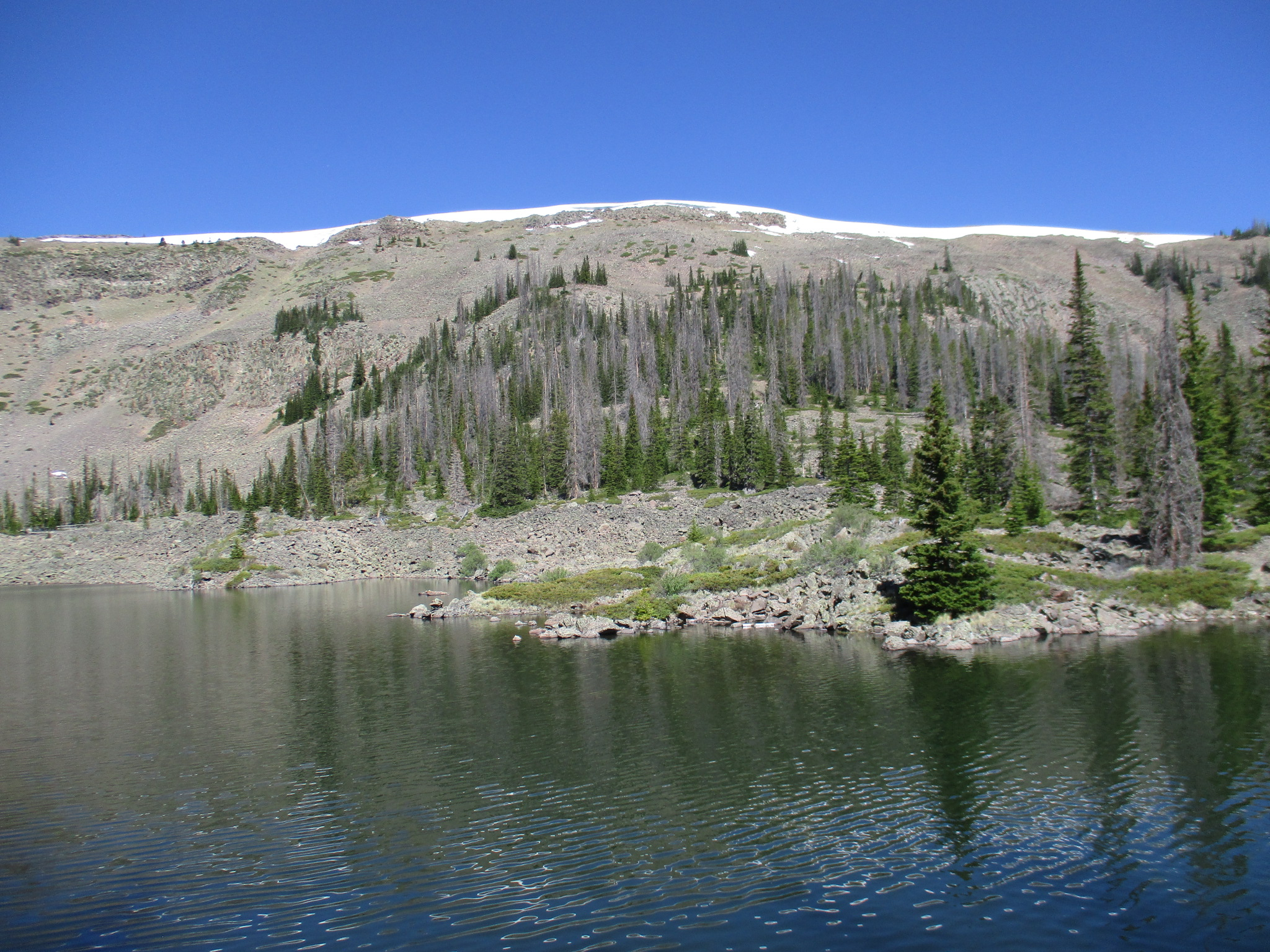
- Long Branch Baldy viewed from the southeast.

Highest point
- Elevation: 11,980 ft (3,650 m)
- Prominence: 1,471 ft (448 m)
- Isolation: 13.87 mi (22.32 km)
- Coordinates: 38°19′20″N 106°28′26″W

Geography
- Location within Colorado
- Location: Saguache County, Colorado, US
- Parent range: Cochetopa Hills, San Juan Mountains, Rocky Mountains
- Topo map(s): USGS 7.5' topographic map Sargents Mesa

Climbing
- Easiest route: class 2

Long Branch Baldy is a mountain in the Cochetopa Hills of the San Juan Mountains of Colorado. The 11,980-foot (3,652 m) mountain is located in Saguache County, Colorado and on the Continental Divide, which here forms the border between Gunnison National Forest and Rio Grande National Forest.

== Geology ==
Long Branch Baldy is located within the San Juan volcanic field and the region is dominated by Tertiary volcanic rocks, including lavas, ash flow tuffs, and breccias. The mountain itself is composed of andesite of the Conejos Formation, deposited by andesitic stratovolcanoes 33 to 29 million years ago. Small scabs of dacite from the Bonanza eruptions (33 million years ago) are present near the summit and on the northern slope of the mountain.

Long Branch Baldy was glaciated, and glacial cirques are located on the northeast and east sides of the mountain where tarns and glacial deposits are found.

== Climate ==
Long Branch Baldy's climate is classified as a subarctic climate (Dfc) in the Köppen system, with cold, snowy winters and cool summers. It receives precipitation as snow in winter and as thunderstorms in summer, with June typically being a drier month.

== Hiking ==
Hiking to the summit of Long Branch Baldy is typically done during the summer and early fall when snow is free of the roads used to reach the trailheads. A common route to the summit starts at the Long Branch Trailhead located at the end of Forest Road 780, 4.6 miles (7.4 km) south of the town of Sargents. A hike along the Baldy Lake Trail (Forest Trail 491) leads to the Continental Divide Trail (CDT). From there, a short hike west along the CDT to the mountain's south ridge allows for an off-trail, class 2 ridge hike leading north to the summit. This 7.2-mile (11.6 km) route (one-way) has an elevation gain of 3,400 feet (1,036 m).

Long Branch Baldy can also be reached from four-wheel-drive roads and trails to the west, south, and east. The shortest of these hikes begins at the Razor Creek Trailhead. From here the CDT can be followed northeast to the southwest ridge of the mountain, which can then be hiked to the summit. This 4.4-mile (7.1 km) route (one-way) has an elevation gain of 1,600 feet (488 m).
