= San Juan Mountains =

Mountain range in Colorado and New Mexico, United States

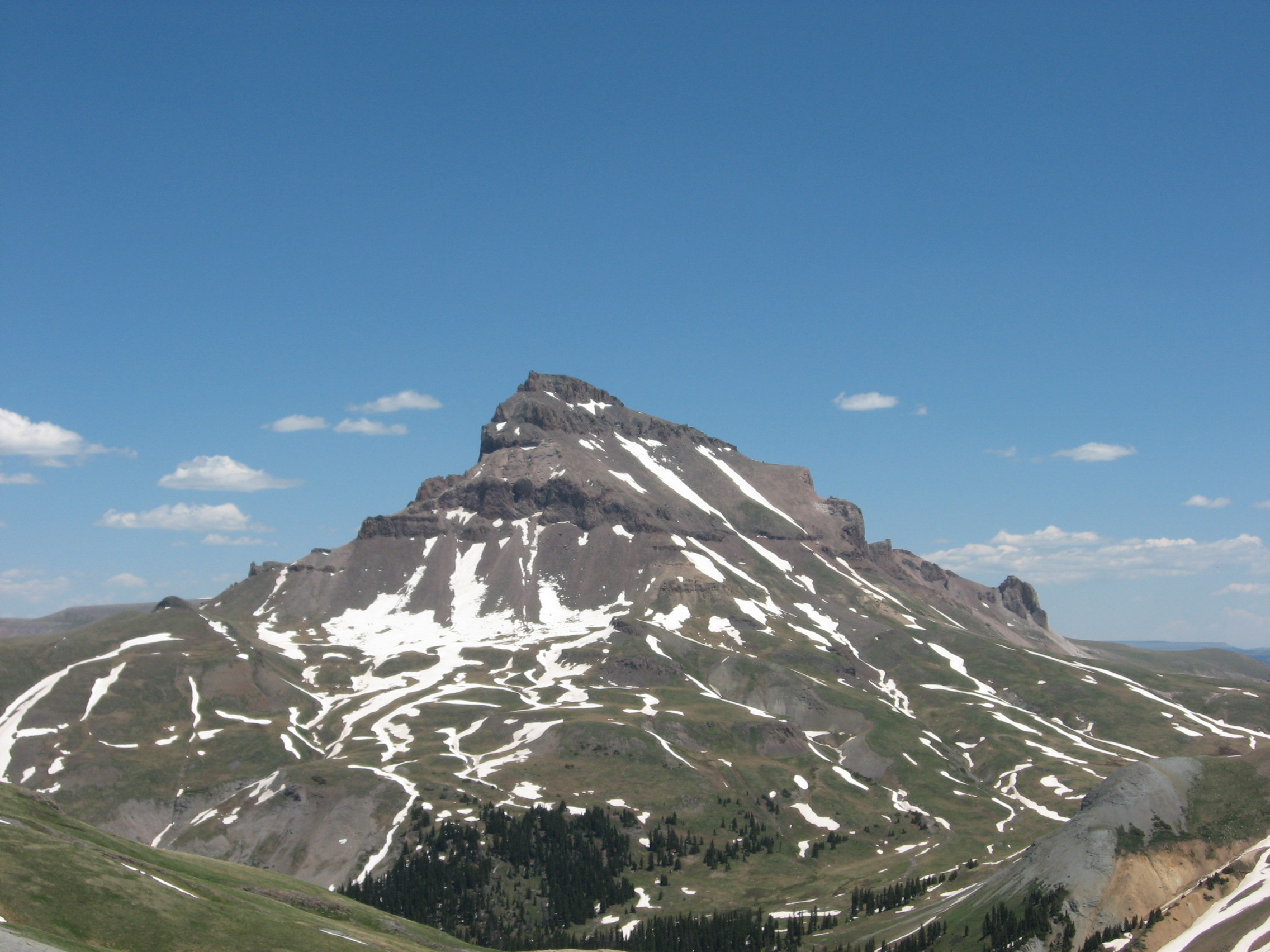
- Uncompahgre Peak

Highest point
- Peak: Uncompahgre Peak
- Elevation: 14,321 ft (4,365 m)
- Listing: Mountain ranges of Colorado
- Coordinates: 38°04′18″N 107°27′14″W

Geography
- Location within Colorado
- Country: United States
- State(s): Colorado, New Mexico
- Parent range: Rocky Mountains

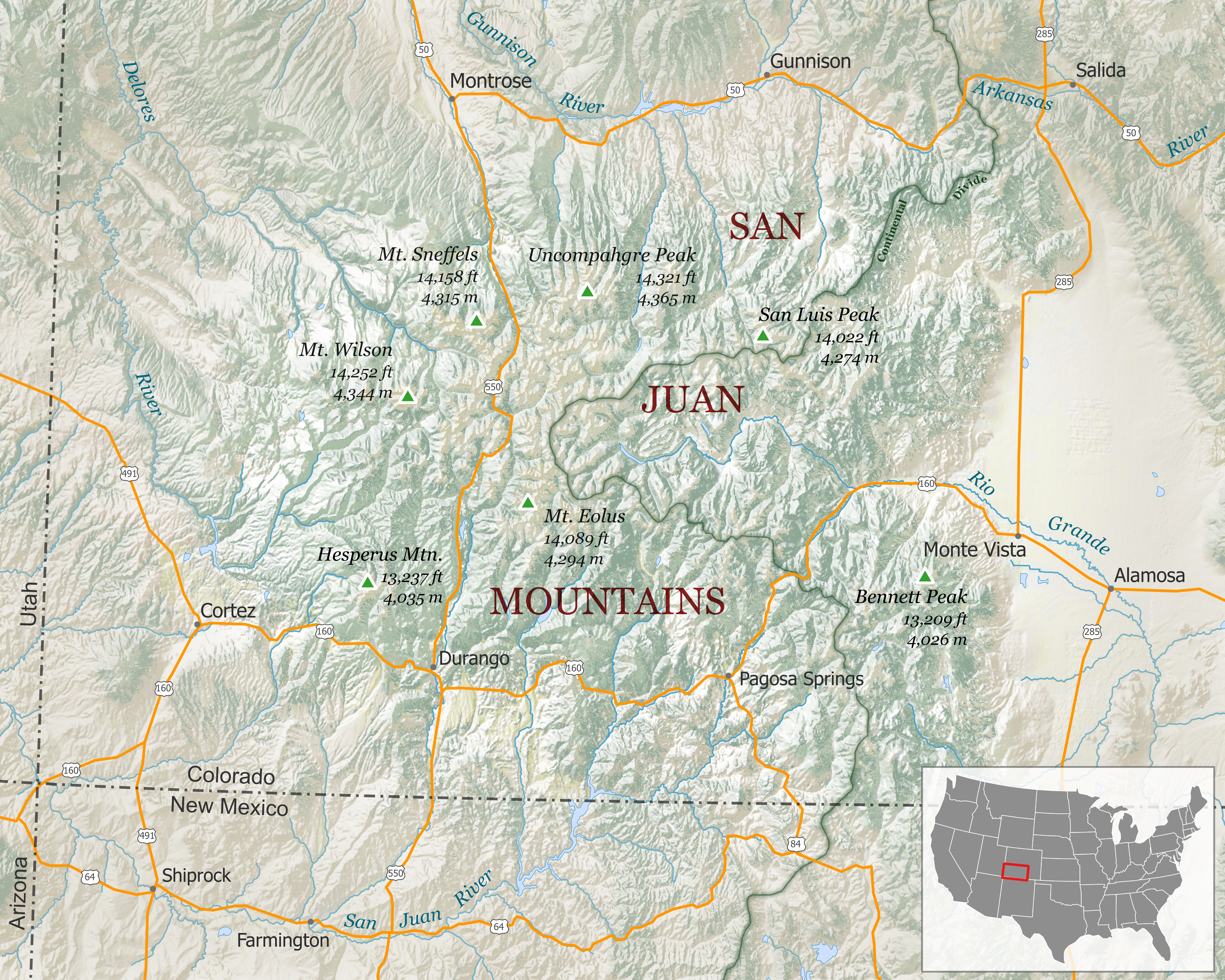
The San Juan Mountains in southern Colorado

The San Juan Mountains are a high and rugged mountain range in the Rocky Mountains in southwestern Colorado and northwestern New Mexico. The area is highly mineralized (the Colorado Mineral Belt) and figured in the gold and silver mining industry of early Colorado. Major towns, all old mining camps, include Creede, Lake City, Silverton, Ouray, and Telluride. Large scale mining has ended in the region, although independent prospectors still work claims throughout the range. The last large-scale mines were the Sunnyside Mine near Silverton, which operated until late in the 20th century, and the Idarado Mine on Red Mountain Pass, which closed in the 1970s. Famous old San Juan mines include the Camp Bird and Smuggler Union mines, both located between Telluride and Ouray.

The Summitville mine was the scene of a major environmental disaster in the 1990s when the liner of a cyanide-laced tailing pond began leaking heavily. Summitville is in the Summitville caldera, one of many extinct volcanoes making up the San Juan volcanic field. One, La Garita Caldera, is 35 miles (56 km) in diameter. Large beds of lava, some extending under the floor of the San Luis Valley, are characteristic of the eastern slope of the San Juans. The eruption of the La Garita Caldera shaped the San Juan Mountains by completely obliterating the volcanoes that once stood in the area.

Tourism is a major part of the regional economy, with the narrow gauge railway between Durango and Silverton being an attraction mostly in the summer and fall. Off-roading is popular on the old trails which linked the historic mining camps, including the notorious Black Bear Road. Visiting old ghost towns is popular, as is wilderness trekking and mountain climbing. Many of the old mining camps are popular sites of summer homes. Though the San Juans are extremely steep and receive much snow, so far only Telluride has made the transition to a major ski resort. Purgatory Resort, once known as Durango Mountain Resort, is a small ski area 26 miles north of Durango. There is also skiing on Wolf Creek Pass at the Wolf Creek ski area. Recently Silverton Mountain ski area has begun operation near Silverton. The range is also a popular destination for endurance sports like trail running and mountain biking; Silverton is home to the Hardrock 100 Endurance Run one of the most difficult and technical ultra-marathons in the world. The San Juan Skyway, a 236-mile route through the area, now provides access to the mountains and towns like Durango, Dolores, Ridgway, Ouray, and Silverton. The stretch between the final two towns is nicknamed the "Million Dollar Highway."

The Rio Grande drains the east side of the range. The other side of the San Juans, the western slope of the continental divide, is drained by tributaries of the San Juan, Dolores and Gunnison rivers, which all flow into the Colorado River.

The San Juan and Uncompahgre National Forests cover a large portion of the San Juan Mountains. The Continental Divide Trail, a long-distance hiking trail follows the crest of the San Juan Mountains. The Weminuche Wilderness, Colorado's largest wilderness area, with an area of 499,771 acres (202,250 ha) is in the San Juans. 152 miles of the Continental Divide trail are located on Trail #813 which follow through the San Juan wilderness and Weminuche Wilderness.

The San Juan Mountains are also distinctive for their high altitude plateaus and peaks. As a result, facilities in the towns and cities of the region are among the highest in the nation. Telluride Airport, at an elevation of 9,070 feet, is the highest in the United States with regularly scheduled commercial service.

== Prominent peaks ==
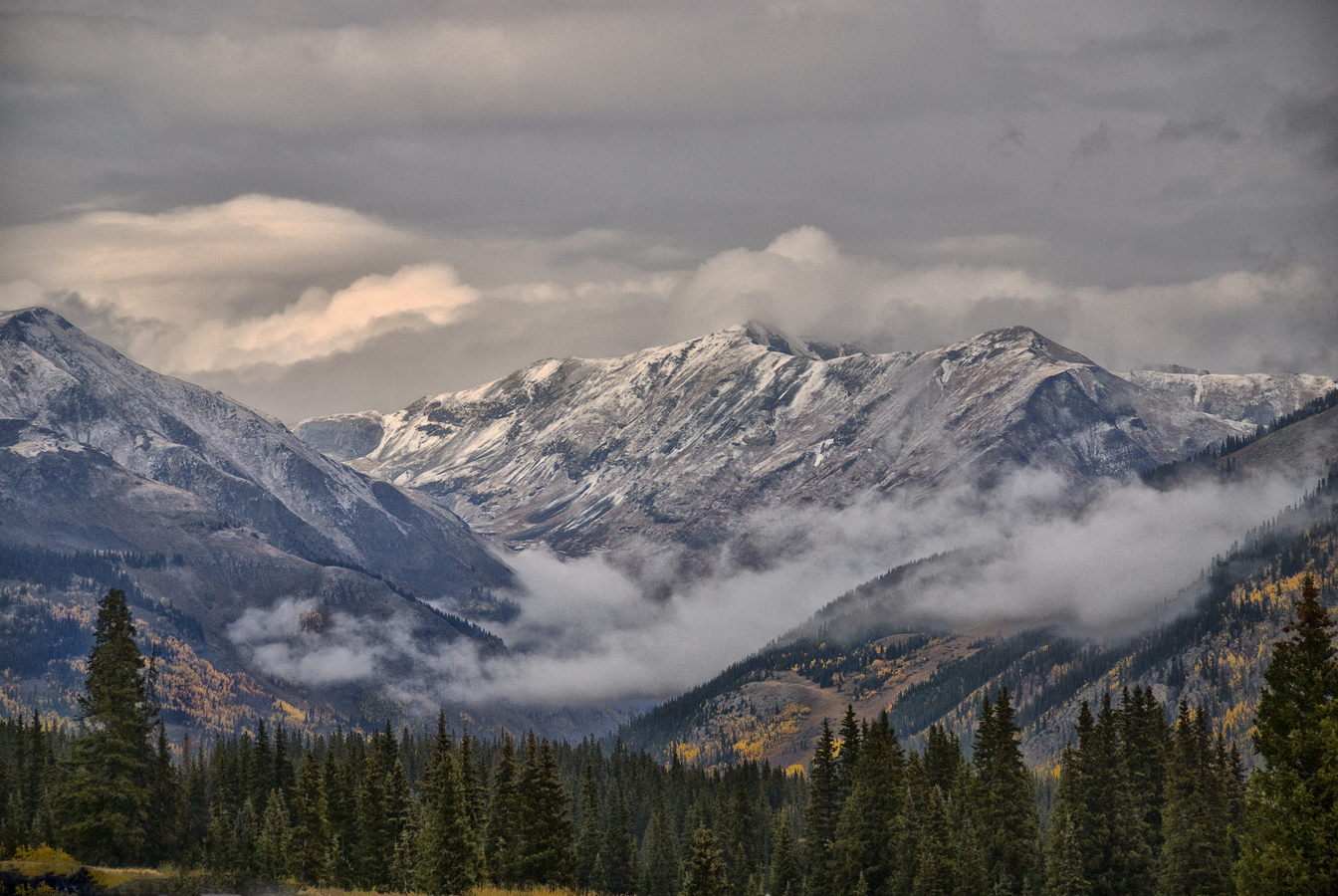
San Juans in the fall of 2008, viewed from north of Durango

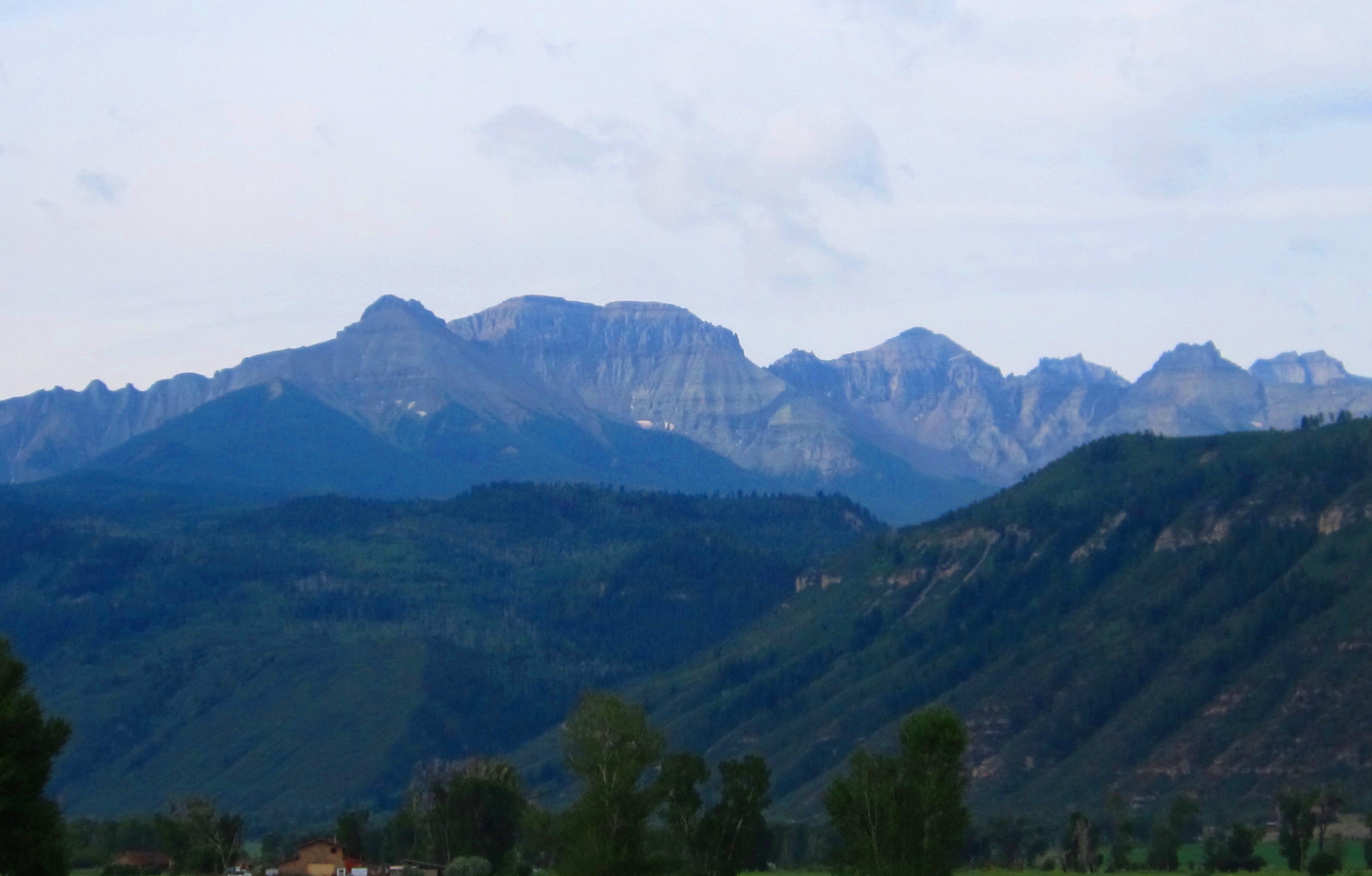
Sneffels Range viewed from Ridgway, Colorado

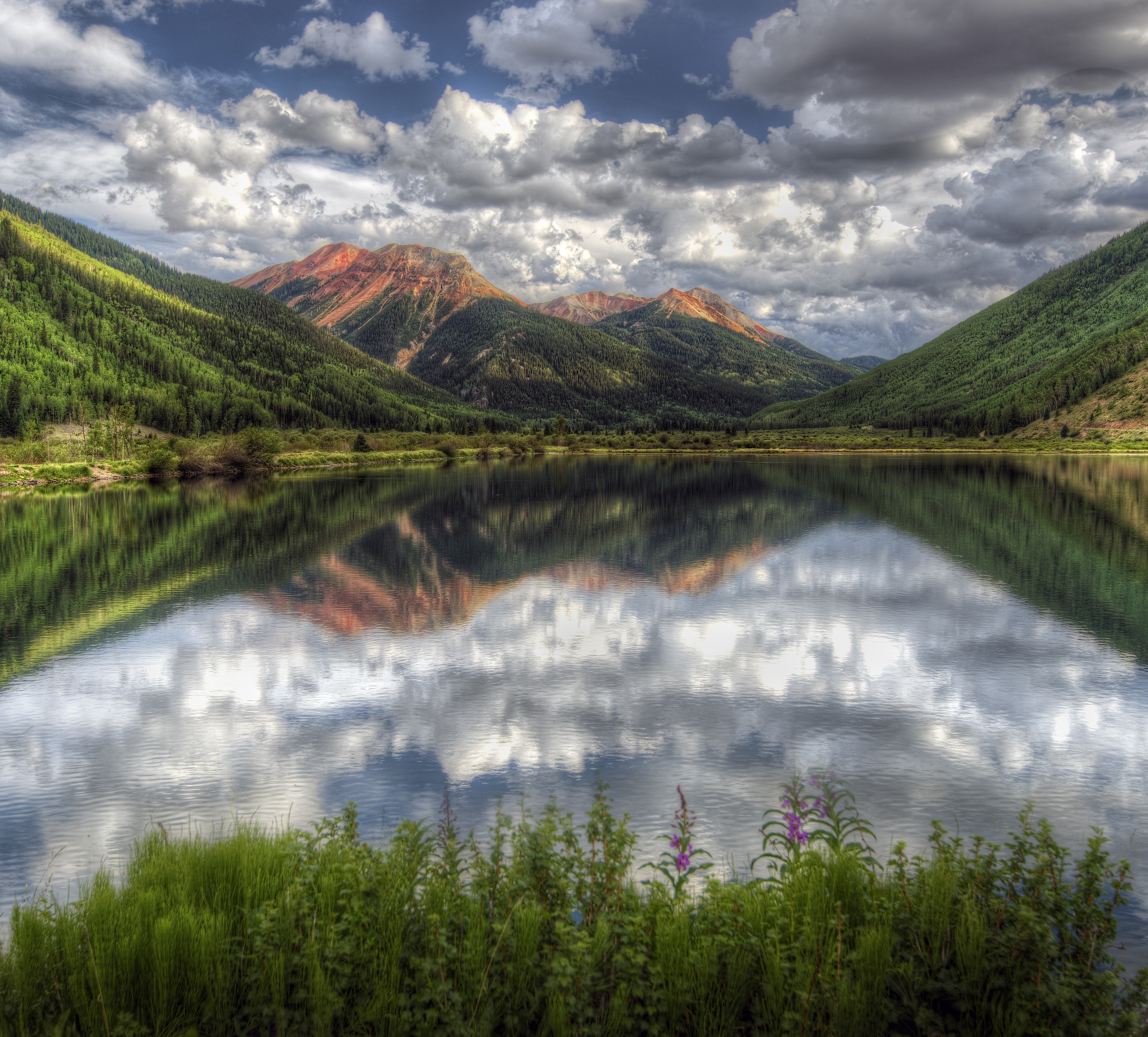
Red Mountain Pass

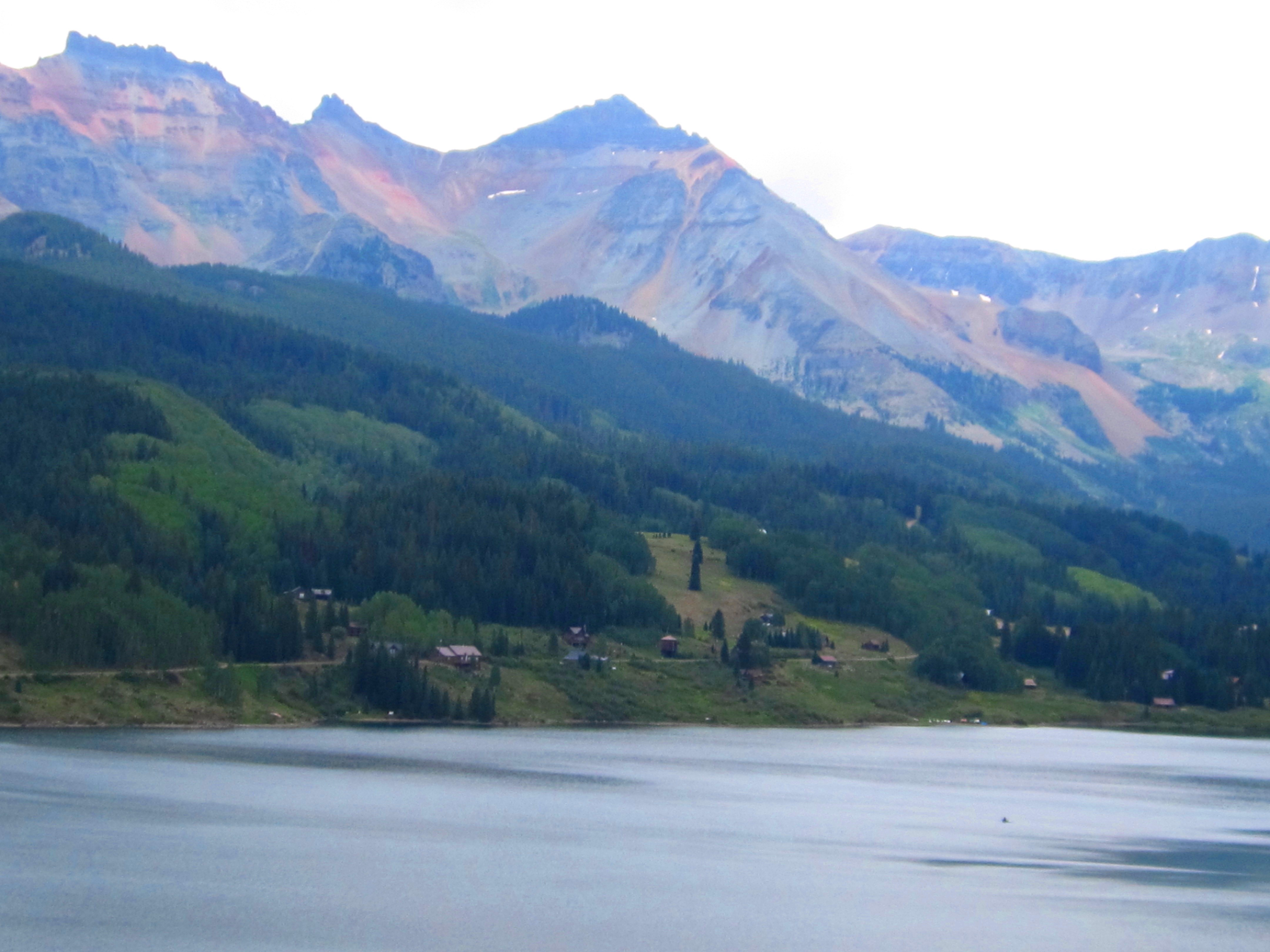
Trout Lake near Telluride

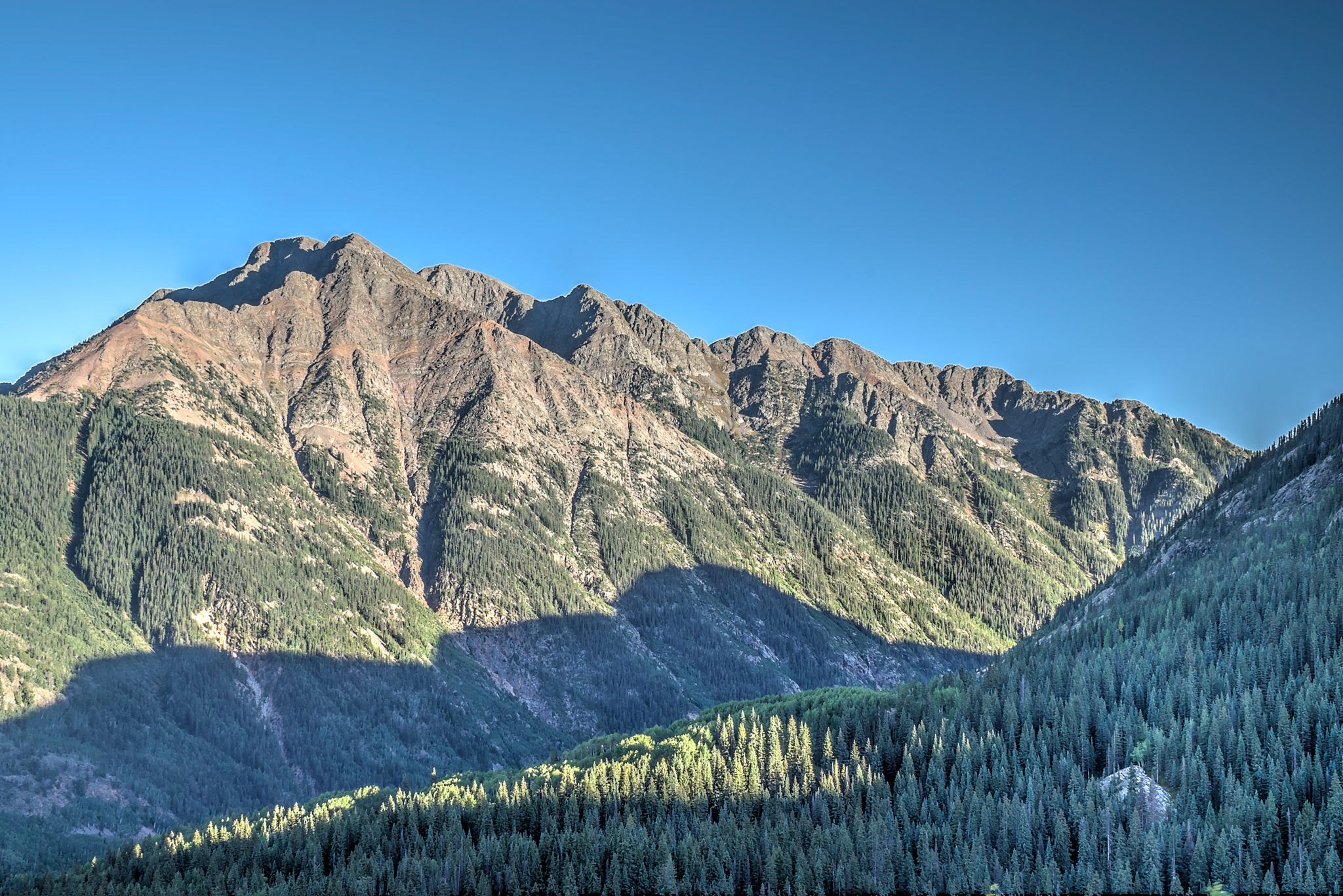
Twilight Peak

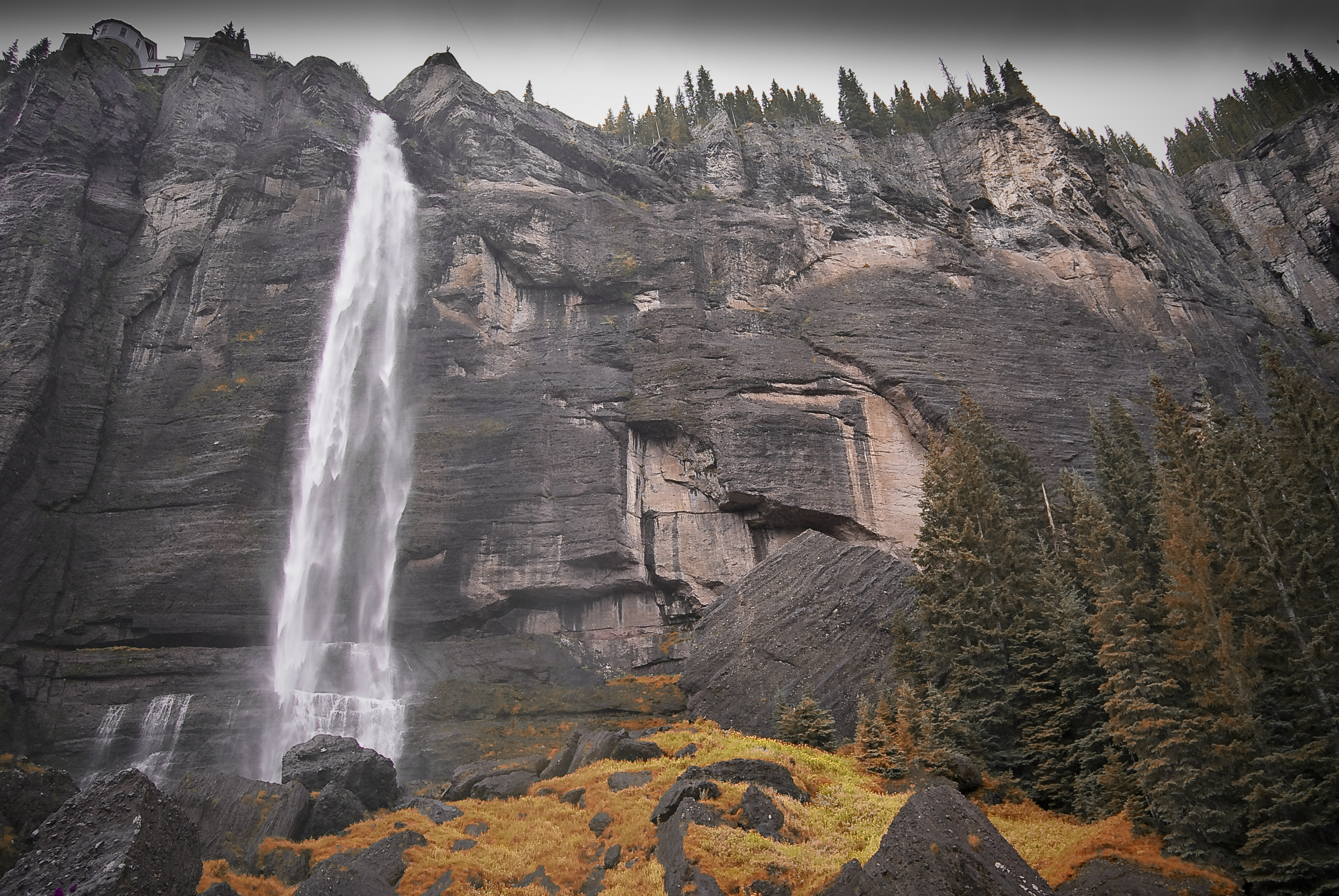
Bridal Veil Falls near Telluride

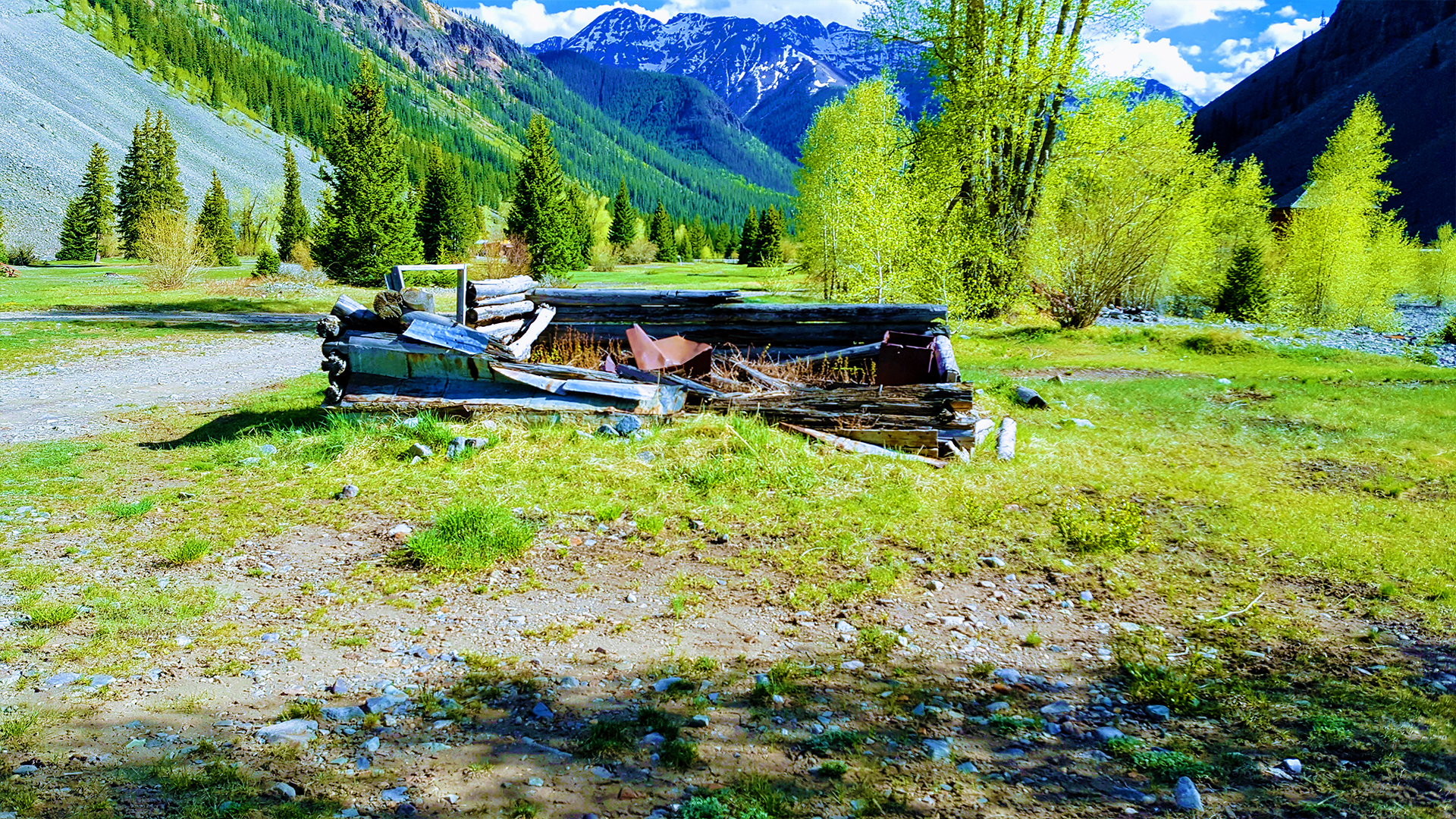
Remains of an abandoned house in Eureka

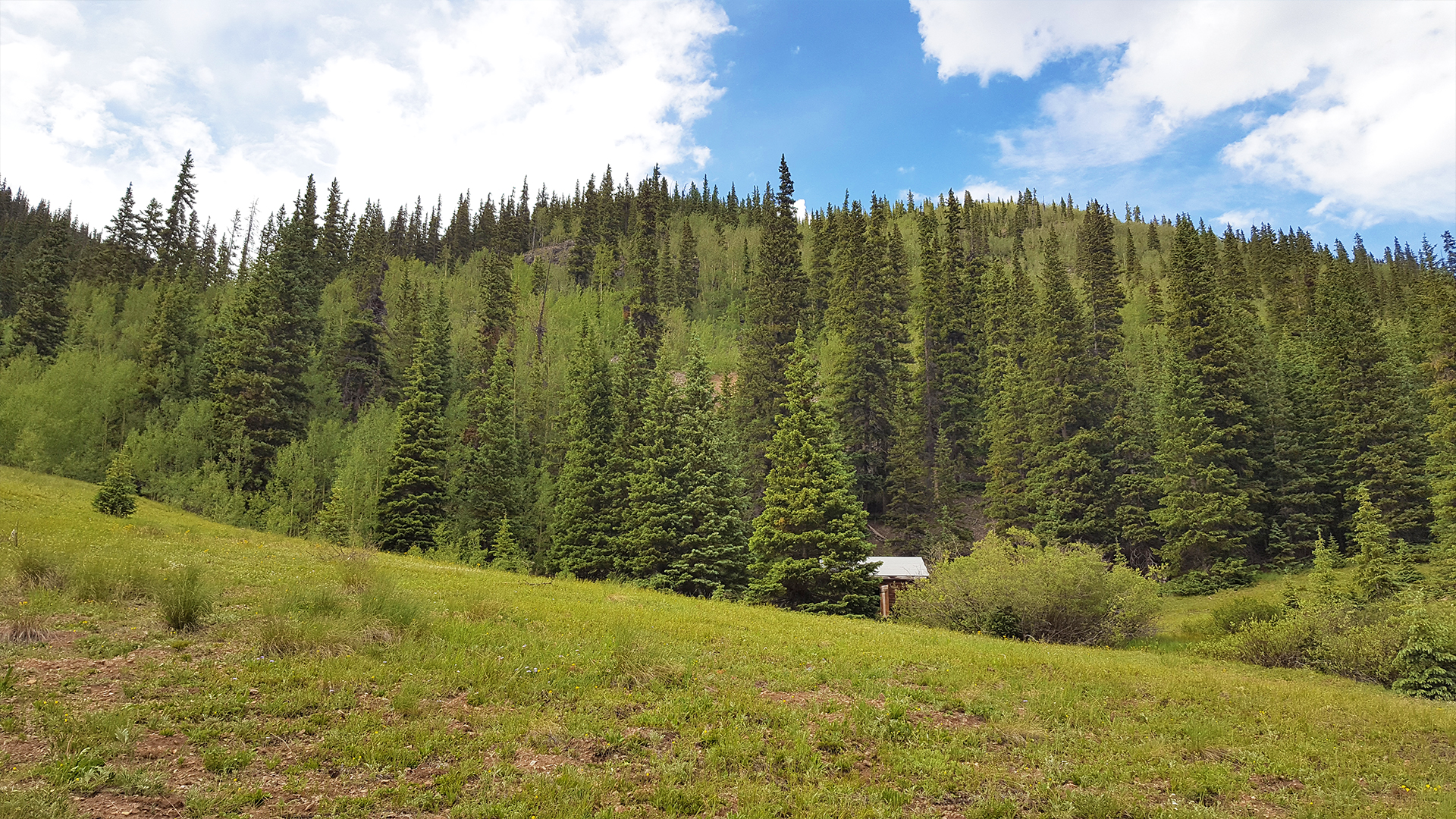
Abandoned house in the ghost town of Gladstone

- Note: This is only a partial list of important peaks in the San Juans, listing peaks by prominence only. There are dozens more summits over 12,000 feet.

The 28 peaks of the San Juan Mountains with at least 500 meters of prominence
Rank	Mountain Peak	Elevation	Prominence	Isolation
1	Uncompahgre Peak NGS	4365 m 14,321 ft	1304 m 4,277 ft	136.9 km 85.1 mi
2	Mount Wilson	4344 m 14,252 ft	1227 m 4,024 ft	53.2 km 33.1 mi
3	Mount Sneffels NGS	4315 m 14,158 ft	930 m 3,050 ft	25.3 km 15.73 mi
4	Mount Eolus	4295 m 14,090 ft	665 m 2,183 ft	40.5 km 25.2 mi
5	Handies Peak NGS	4285 m 14,058 ft	575 m 1,888 ft	18 km 11.18 mi
6	San Luis Peak NGS	4274 m 14,022 ft	949 m 3,113 ft	43.4 km 27 mi
7	Vermilion Peak PB	4237 m 13,900 ft	642 m 2,105 ft	14.6 km 9.07 mi
8	Rio Grande Pyramid NGS PB	4214 m 13,827 ft	567 m 1,861 ft	17.31 km 10.76 mi
9	Mount Oso	4173 m 13,690 ft	507 m 1,664 ft	8.81 km 5.47 mi
10	Tower Mountain PB	4132 m 13,558 ft	504 m 1,652 ft	8.62 km 5.36 mi
11	Sultan Mountain PB	4076 m 13,373 ft	569 m 1,868 ft	7.39 km 4.59 mi
12	Summit Peak NGS PB	4056 m 13,307 ft	841 m 2,760 ft	64.2 km 39.9 mi
13	Dolores Peak PB	4053 m 13,296 ft	594 m 1,950 ft	8.02 km 4.98 mi
14	Lavender Peak PB	4033 m 13,233 ft	872 m 2,860 ft	39.9 km 24.8 mi
15	Bennett Peak PB	4026 m 13,209 ft	531 m 1,743 ft	27.5 km 17.1 mi
16	Conejos Peak NGS PB	4017 m 13,179 ft	583 m 1,912 ft	13.12 km 8.15 mi
17	Twilight Peak	4012 m 13,163 ft	713 m 2,338 ft	7.86 km 4.88 mi
18	South River Peak PB	4009 m 13,154 ft	746 m 2,448 ft	35.3 km 22 mi
19	Peak 13,010 PB	3967 m 13,016 ft	546 m 1,790 ft	15.39 km 9.56 mi
20	Lone Cone PB	3846 m 12,618 ft	693 m 2,273 ft	14.97 km 9.3 mi
21	Graham Peak NGS PB	3821 m 12,536 ft	778 m 2,551 ft	16.78 km 10.43 mi
22	Elliott Mountain PB	3763 m 12,346 ft	683 m 2,240 ft	8.26 km 5.13 mi
23	Cornwall Mountain PB	3746 m 12,291 ft	532 m 1,744 ft	8.37 km 5.2 mi
24	Sawtooth Mountain NGS PB	3704 m 12,153 ft	587 m 1,927 ft	28.3 km 17.57 mi
25	Chalk Benchmark NGS PB	3669 m 12,038 ft	601 m 1,971 ft	11.68 km 7.26 mi
26	Little Cone NGS PB	3654 m 11,988 ft	561 m 1,841 ft	9.7 km 6.03 mi
27	Cochetopa Dome	3395 m 11,138 ft	537 m 1,762 ft	9.9 km 6.15 mi
28	Horse Mountain PB	3033 m 9,952 ft	575 m 1,887 ft	22.5 km 13.96 mi

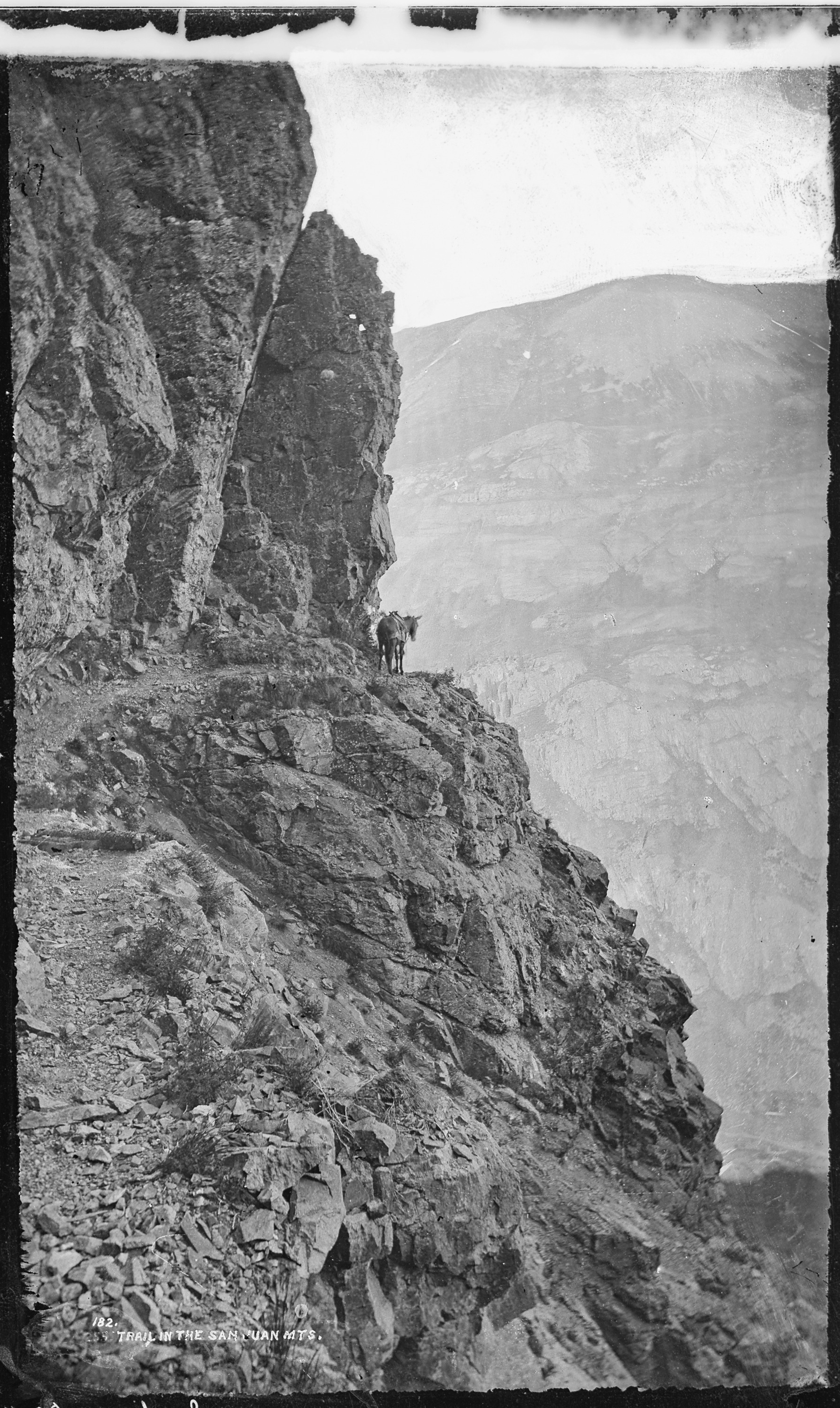
Hayden Geological Survey, 1870s

== History of the area ==
Human history at the eastern edge of the San Juan Mountains dates back thousands of years. Smithsonian archaeologists have identified paleo-Indian sites that are about 5,000 years old, located near Great Sand Dunes National Park and Preserve and at the northern edge of the San Luis Valley, close to Poncha Pass. This suggests that early human presence in the region dates back to ancient times, long before the establishment of modern landmarks.

Before the Treaty of Guadalupe Hidalgo was signed in 1848, all of what is now western Colorado was occupied by the Nuche, commonly known as the Ute people. In 1866, Kit Carson, Ouray, and Nicaagat negotiated a treaty that created the Ute Indian Reservation in 1868 in the western one-third of the Territory of Colorado. In 1869, White prospectors, illegally trespassing on the reservation, discovered silver in the San Juan Mountains. Seeking to open the San Juan Mountains to mining, the Brunot Agreement, ratified by Congress on April 24, 1874, forced the Ute people to cede all of the San Juan Mountains.

In February 1874, the San Juan Mountains were the setting of a notorious survival incident when prospector Alfred Packer led five companions into the range’s rugged interior during a period of extreme winter weather. The group became stranded in the high-altitude terrain, and over time all members except Packer died. He later admitted to cannibalism. The event remains one of the most well-known pieces of regional lore and is commonly associated with an area now referred to as Cannibal Plateau.

Colorado became the 38th State on August 1 1876.

Mining operators in the San Juan mountain area formed the San Juan District Mining Association (SJDMA) in 1903, as a direct result of a Western Federation of Miners proposal to the Telluride Mining Association for the eight-hour day, which had been approved in a referendum by 72 percent of Colorado voters. The new association consolidated the power of thirty-six mining properties in San Miguel, Ouray, and San Juan counties. The SJDMA refused to consider any reduction in hours or increase in wages, helping to provoke a bitter strike.

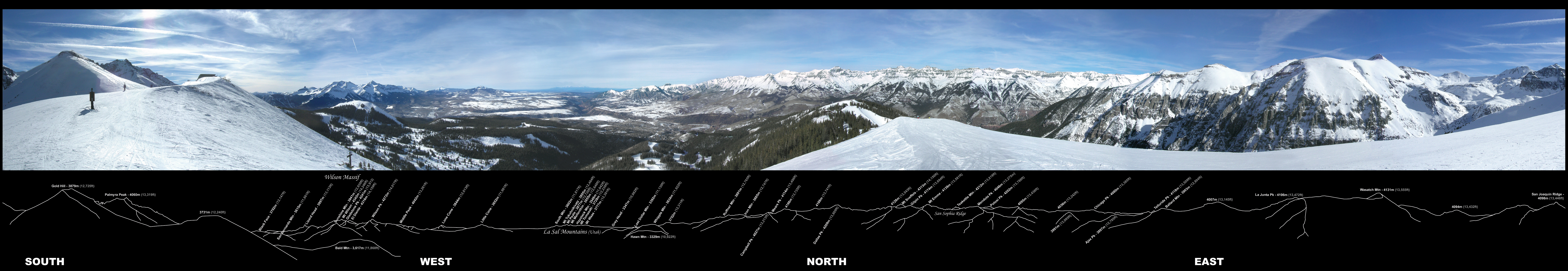
360° panorama of the northwestern San Juans, photographed from the Gold Hill Ridge of the Telluride Ski Resort. Ridgeline annotation indicates the names and elevations of 43 visible peaks

== See also ==
- Southern Rocky Mountains
- Sneffels Range
- Cimarron Ridge
- Needle Mountains
- La Garita Mountains
- Cochetopa Hills
- La Plata Mountains
- Hardrock Hundred Mile Endurance Run
