= Cochetopa Dome =

Mountain in Colorado, United States

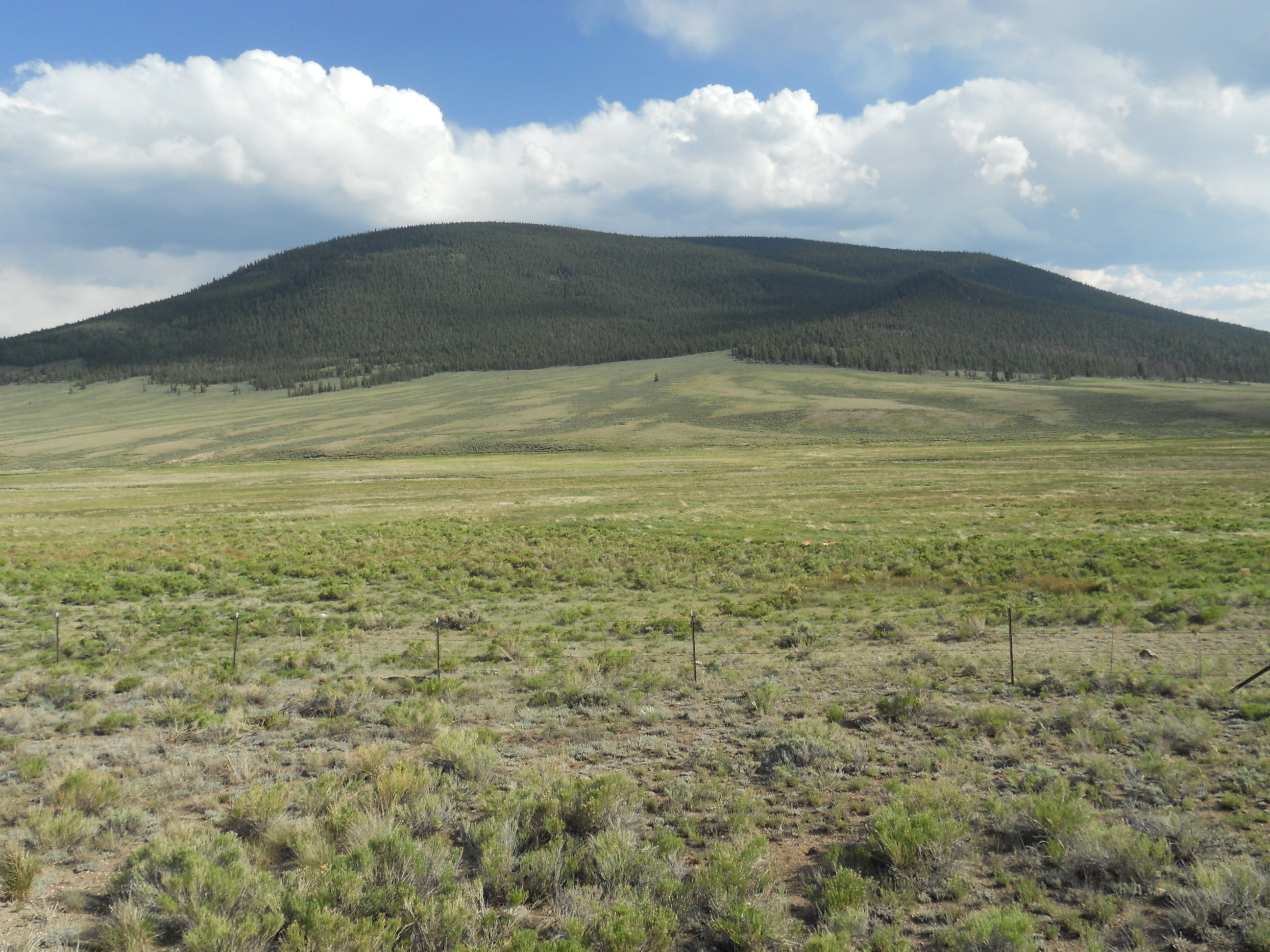
- Cochetopa Dome viewed from the north.

Highest point
- Elevation: 11,138 ft (3,395 m)
- Prominence: 1,752 ft (534 m)
- Isolation: 5.74 mi (9.24 km)
- Coordinates: 38°13′36″N 106°42′53″W

Geography
- Location within Colorado
- Location: Saguache County, Colorado, U.S.
- Parent range: La Garita Mountains
- Topo map(s): USGS 7.5' topographic map Cochetopa Park

Cochetopa Dome (Note: Pronounced /koʊtʃɪˈtoʊpə/ or sometimes locally /koʊtʃɪˈtoʊp/.) is a mountain in the San Juan Mountains, in Saguache County, Colorado. The 11,138-foot (3,395 m) mountain is located in the Gunnison National Forest. With a prominence of 1,752 feet (534 m), Cochetopa Dome is the 110th-most prominent summit in the state of Colorado.

== Geology ==
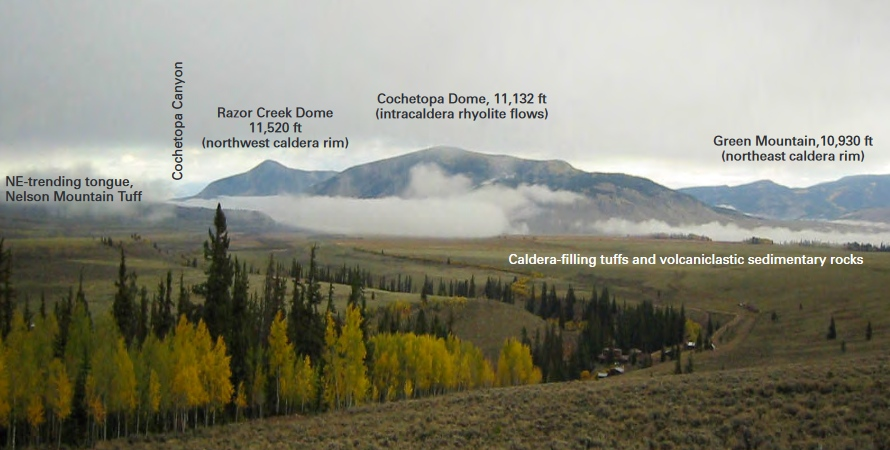
Labeled view of the Cochetopa caldera, including Cochetopa Dome.

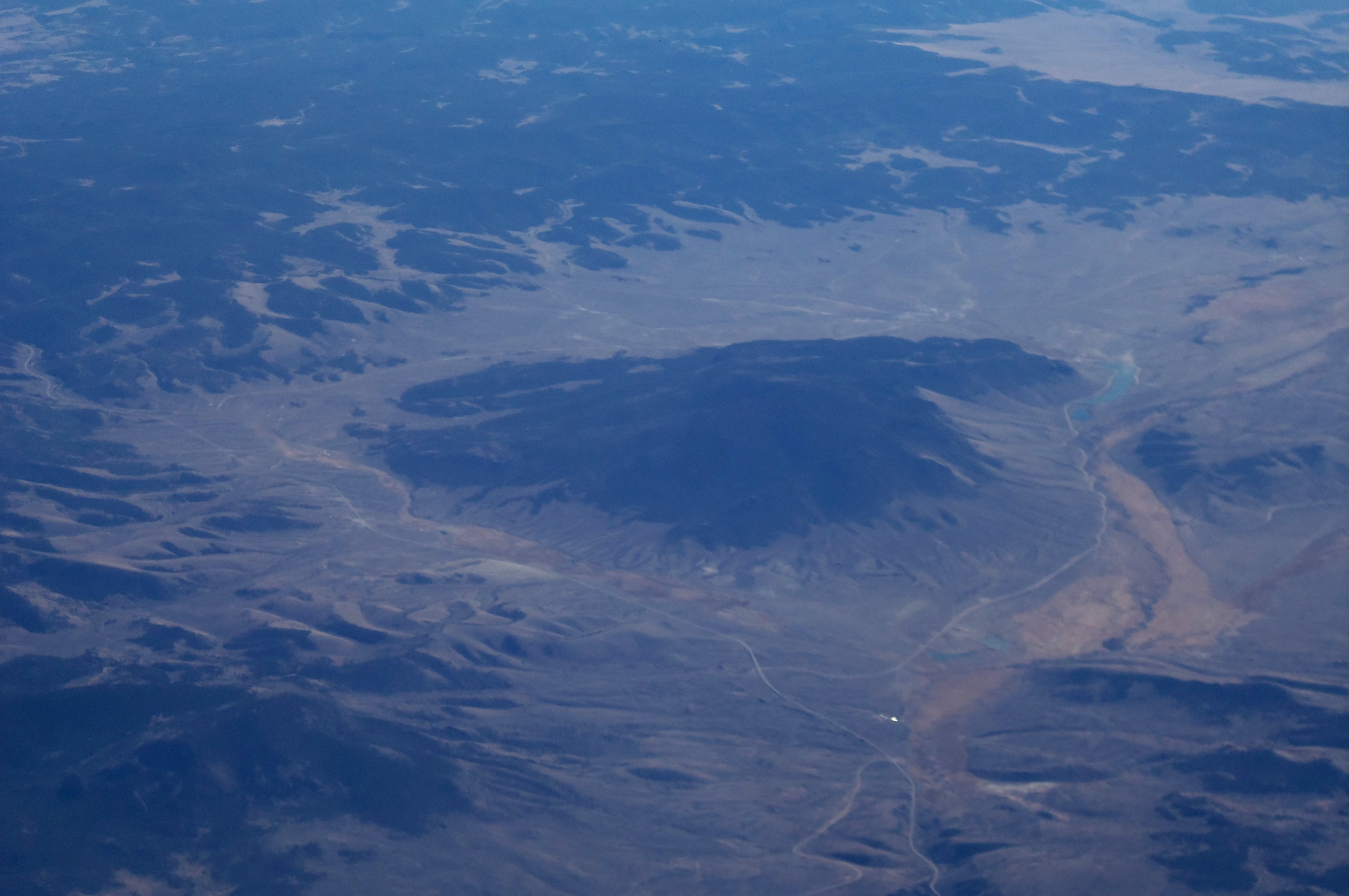
Oblique view Cochetopa Dome and caldera, looking south, in 2020

Cochetopa Dome is a rhyolitic lava dome, extruded into the Cochetopa caldera approximately 27 million years ago. The Chochetopa caldera is one of over a dozen such collapsed volcanoes within the San Juan volcanic field. The caldera is approximately 20 mi (30 km) wide and vertical subsidence was up to 2,600 ft (800 m).

The Cochetopa caldera, with Cochetopa Dome within it, is one of the most recognizable of the calderas in the region. Helping preserve the structure of this particular caldera is that its development was more recent than many of the larger calderas elsewhere in the San Juan Mountains; thus, there was less regional volcanism to disrupt the caldera's structure. Also, the caldera was only modestly filled with post-subsidence sediments and much of this was weaker, tuffaceaus deposits, which have been more readily eroded from the caldera floor. And lastly, the caldera is drained through Cochetopa Canyon where hard, Precambrian igneous rock has limited downcutting and erosion of the caldera. The present vegetation helps make the caldera's features and extent even more apparent. The floor of the caldera is dominated by grass and shrublands while the caldera rim and the interior lava dome (Cochetopa Dome) are forested. This contrast in vegetation helps a visitor visualize the caldera

== Hiking ==
Private property to the north and west limits access to the mountain. The summit can be reached on public land from the southeast. From the Cochetopa Park Spur F Road (Forest Road 804.1F), at an open saddle at an elevation of 9,750 feet (2,972 m), the summit is a 2-mile (3.2 km), class-2 hike through meadow and forest. The elevation gain is 1,400 feet (427 m).

== See also ==
- List of Colorado mountain ranges
- List of Colorado mountain summits
  - List of the most prominent summits of Colorado
- List of Colorado county high points
