= Carboniferous =

Fifth period of the Paleozoic Era

- 358.86 ± 0.19 – 298.9 ± 0.15 Ma
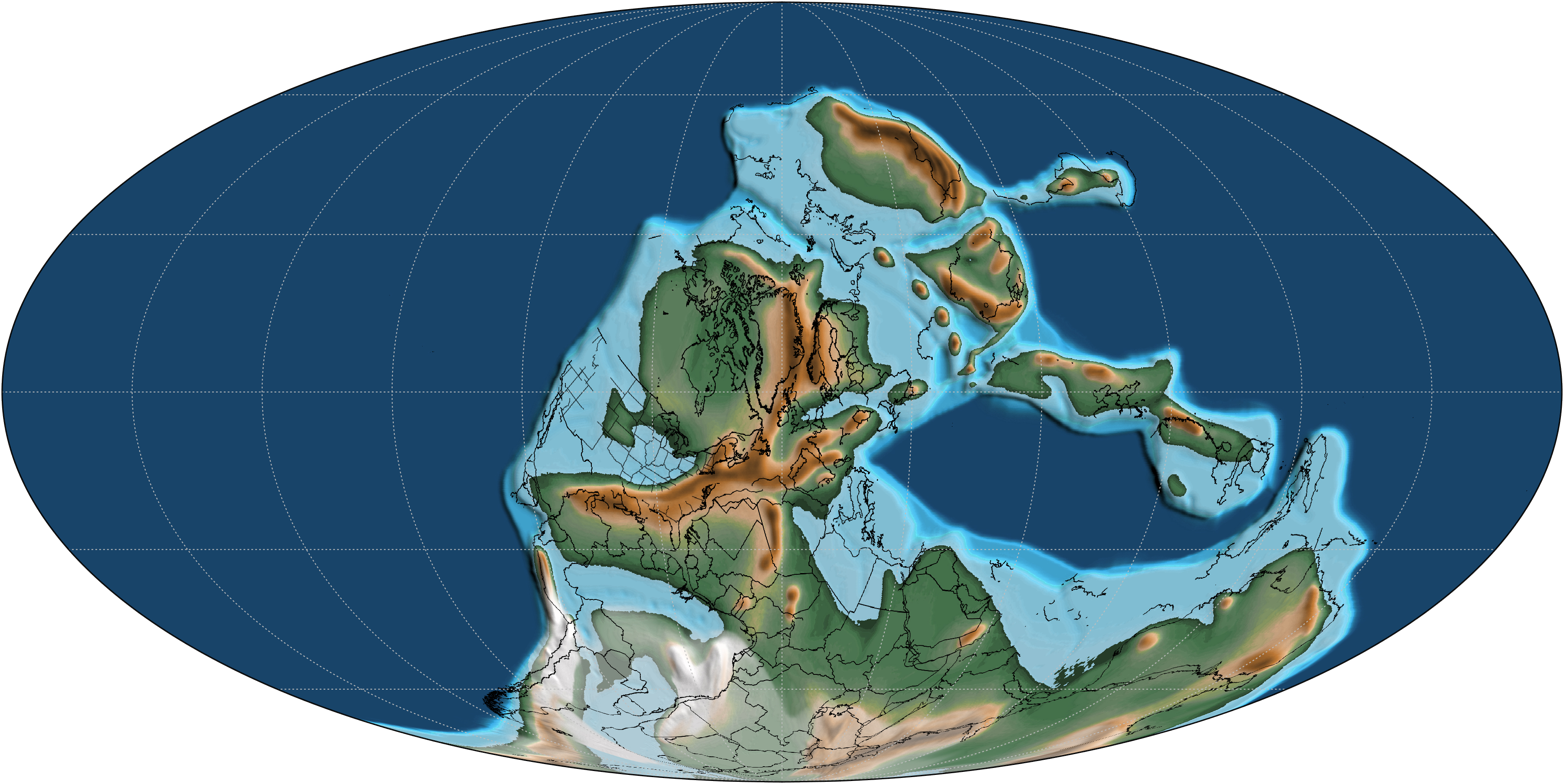
- A map of Earth as it appeared 330 million years ago during the Carboniferous Period, Mississippian Subperiod

Chronology
← / Carboniferous Rainforest Collapse; ← / Mazon Creek Fossils; ← / End of Romer's Gap; ← / Beginning of Romer's Gap
Subdivision of the Carboniferous according to the ICS, as of 2024. Vertical axis scale: Millions of years ago

Etymology
- Name formality: Formal
- Nickname(s): Age of Amphibians

Usage information
- Celestial body: Earth
- Regional usage: Global (ICS)
- Time scale(s) used: ICS Time Scale

Definition
- Chronological unit: Period
- Stratigraphic unit: System
- First proposed by: William Daniel Conybeare and William Phillips, 1822
- Time span formality: Formal
- Lower boundary definition: FAD of the Conodont Siphonodella sulcata (discovered to have biostratigraphic issues as of 2006)
- Lower boundary GSSP: La Serre, Montagne Noire, France; 43.5555°N 3.3573°E
- Lower GSSP ratified: 1990
- Upper boundary definition: FAD of the Conodont Streptognathodus isolatus within the morphotype Streptognathodus wabaunsensis chronocline
- Upper boundary GSSP: Aidaralash, Ural Mountains, Kazakhstan; 50.2458°N 57.8914°E
- Upper GSSP ratified: 1996

Atmospheric and climatic data
- Sea level above present day: Falling from 120 m to present-day level throughout the Mississippian, then rising steadily to about 80 m at end of period

The Carboniferous (/ˌkɑːrbəˈnɪfərəs/ KAR-bə-NIF-ər-əs) is a geologic period and system of the Paleozoic era that spans 60 million years, from the end of the Devonian Period 358.86 Ma (million years ago) to the beginning of the Permian Period, 298.9 Ma. It is the fifth period of the Phanerozoic eon. In North America, the Carboniferous is often treated as two separate geological periods, the earlier Mississippian and the later Pennsylvanian.

The name Carboniferous means "coal-bearing", from the Latin carbō ("coal") and ferō ("bear, carry"), and refers to the many coal beds formed globally during that time. The first of the modern "system" names, it was coined by geologists William Conybeare and William Phillips in 1822, based on a study of the British rock succession.

The Carboniferous is the period during which both terrestrial animal and land plant life was well established. Stegocephalia (four-limbed vertebrates including true tetrapods), whose forerunners (tetrapodomorphs) had evolved from lobe-finned fish during the preceding Devonian period, became pentadactylous during the Carboniferous. The period is sometimes called the Age of Amphibians because of the diversification of early amphibians such as the temnospondyls, which became dominant land vertebrates, as well as the first appearance of amniotes including synapsids (the clade to which modern mammals belong) and sauropsids (which include modern reptiles and birds) during the late Carboniferous. Land arthropods such as arachnids (e.g. trigonotarbids and Pulmonoscorpius), myriapods (e.g. Arthropleura) and especially insects (particularly flying insects) also underwent a major evolutionary radiation during the late Carboniferous. Vast swaths of forests and swamps covered the land, which eventually became the coal beds characteristic of the Carboniferous stratigraphy evident today.

The later half of the period experienced glaciations, low sea level, and mountain building as the continents collided to form Pangaea. A minor marine and terrestrial extinction event, the Carboniferous rainforest collapse, occurred at the end of the period, caused by climate change. Atmospheric oxygen levels, originally thought to be consistently higher than today throughout the Carboniferous, have been shown to be more variable, increasing from low levels at the beginning of the Period to highs of 25–30%.

== Etymology and history ==
The development of a Carboniferous chronostratigraphic timescale began in the late 18th century. The term "Carboniferous" was first used as an adjective by Irish geologist Richard Kirwan in 1799 and later used in a heading entitled "Coal-measures or Carboniferous Strata" by John Farey Sr. in 1811. Four units were originally ascribed to the Carboniferous, in ascending order, the Old Red Sandstone, Carboniferous Limestone, Millstone Grit and the Coal Measures. These four units were placed into a formalised Carboniferous unit by William Conybeare and William Phillips in 1822 and then into the Carboniferous System by Phillips in 1835. The Old Red Sandstone was later considered Devonian in age.

The similarity in successions between the British Isles and Western Europe led to the development of a common European timescale with the Carboniferous System divided into the lower Dinantian, dominated by carbonate deposition and the upper Silesian with mainly siliciclastic deposition. The Dinantian was divided into the Tournaisian and Viséan stages. The Silesian was divided into the Namurian, Westphalian and Stephanian stages. The Tournaisian is the same length as the International Commission on Stratigraphy (ICS) stage, but the Viséan is longer, extending into the lower Serpukhovian.

North American geologists recognised a similar stratigraphy but divided it into two systems rather than one. These are the lower carbonate-rich sequence of the Mississippian System and the upper siliciclastic and coal-rich sequence of the Pennsylvanian. The United States Geological Survey officially recognised these two systems in 1953. In Russia, in the 1840s British and Russian geologists divided the Carboniferous into the Lower, Middle and Upper series based on Russian sequences. In the 1890s these became the Dinantian, Moscovian and Uralian stages. The Serpukivian was proposed as part of the Lower Carboniferous, and the Upper Carboniferous was divided into the Moscovian and Gzhelian. The Bashkirian was added in 1934.

In 1975, the ICS formally ratified the Carboniferous System, with the Mississippian and Pennsylvanian subsystems from the North American timescale, the Tournaisian and Visean stages from the Western European and the Serpukhovian, Bashkirian, Moscovian, Kasimovian and Gzhelian from the Russian. With the formal ratification of the Carboniferous System, the Dinantian, Silesian, Namurian, Westphalian and Stephanian became redundant terms, although the latter three are still in common use in Western Europe.

== Geology ==
=== Stratigraphy ===
Stages can be defined globally or regionally. For global stratigraphic correlation, the ICS ratify global stages based on a Global Boundary Stratotype Section and Point (GSSP) from a single formation (a stratotype) identifying the lower boundary of the stage. Only the boundaries of the Carboniferous System and three of the stage bases are defined by global stratotype sections and points because of the complexity of the geology. The ICS subdivisions from youngest to oldest are as follows:

Series/epoch		Stage/age	Lower boundary
Permian		Asselian	298.9 ± 0.15 Ma
Pennsylvanian	Upper	Gzhelian	303.7 ± 0.1 Ma
Pennsylvanian	Upper	Kasimovian	307 ± 0.1 Ma
Pennsylvanian	Middle	Moscovian	315.2 ± 0.2 Ma
Pennsylvanian	Lower	Bashkirian	323.4 ± 0.4 Ma
Mississippian	Upper	Serpukhovian	330.3 ± 0.4 Ma
Mississippian	Middle	Visean	346.7 ±0.4 Ma
Mississippian	Lower	Tournaisian	358.86 ± 0.19 Ma

==== Mississippian ====
The Mississippian was proposed by Alexander Winchell in 1870 named after the extensive exposure of lower Carboniferous limestone in the upper Mississippi River valley. During the Mississippian, there was a marine connection between the Paleo-Tethys and Panthalassa through the Rheic Ocean resulting in the near worldwide distribution of marine faunae and so allowing widespread correlations using marine biostratigraphy. However, there are few Mississippian volcanic rocks, and so obtaining radiometric dates is difficult.

The Tournaisian Stage is named after the Belgian city of Tournai. It was introduced in scientific literature by Belgian geologist André Dumont in 1832. The GSSP for the base of the Carboniferous System, Mississippian Subsystem and Tournaisian Stage is located at the La Serre section in Montagne Noire, southern France. It is defined by the first appearance of the conodont Siphonodella sulcata within the evolutionary lineage from Siphonodella praesulcata to Siphonodella sulcata. This was ratified by the ICS in 1990. However, in 2006 further study revealed the presence of Siphonodella sulcata below the boundary, and the presence of Siphonodella praesulcata and Siphonodella sulcata together above a local unconformity. This means the evolution of one species to the other, the definition of the boundary, is not seen at the La Serre site making precise correlation difficult.

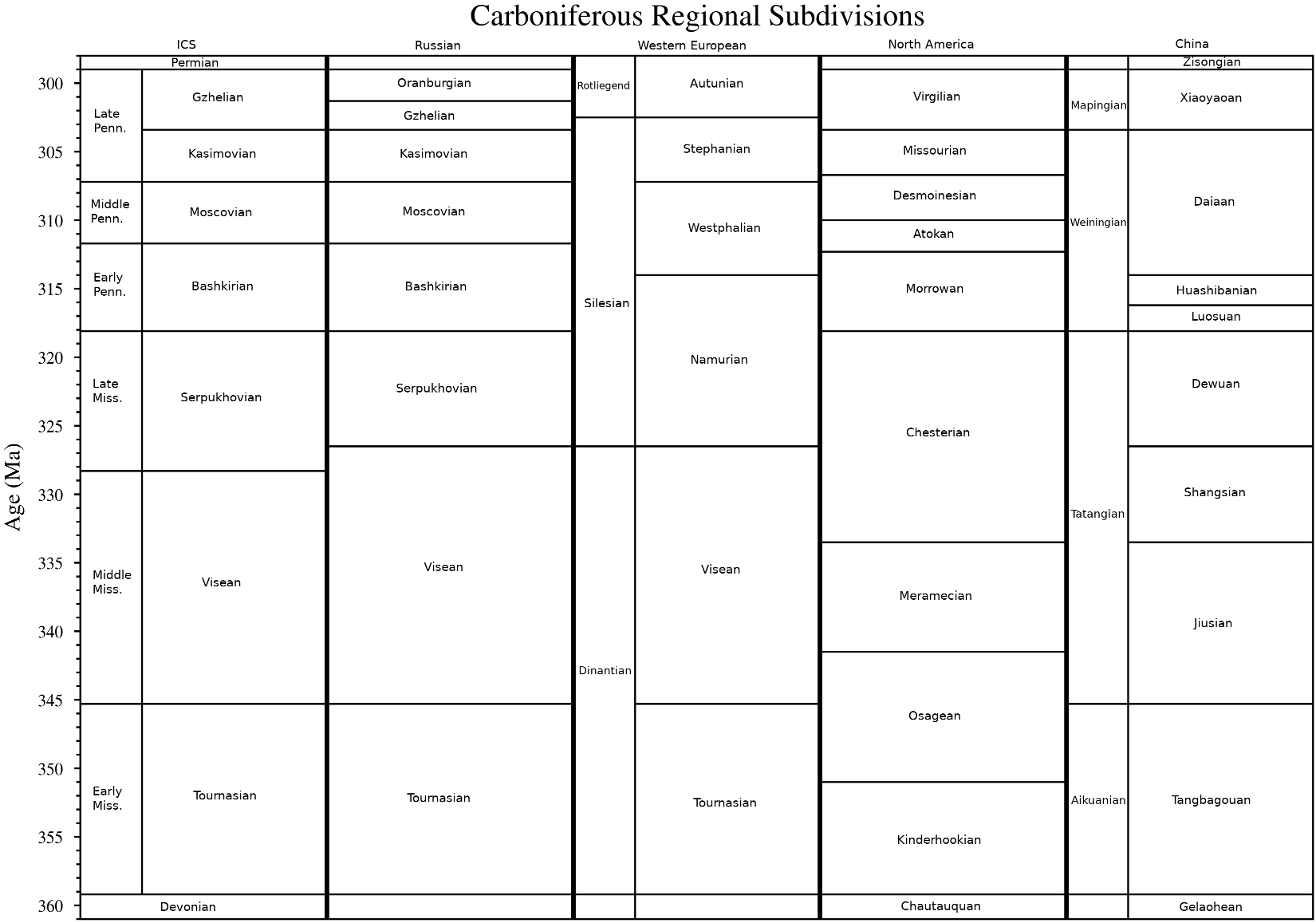
Chart of regional subdivisions of the Carboniferous Period

The Viséan Stage was introduced by André Dumont in 1832 and is named after the city of Visé, Liège Province, Belgium. In 1967, the base of the Visean was officially defined as the first black limestone in the Leffe facies at the Bastion Section in the Dinant Basin. These changes are now thought to be ecologically driven rather than caused by evolutionary change, and so this has not been used as the location for the GSSP. Instead, the GSSP for the base of the Visean is located in Bed 83 of the sequence of dark grey limestones and shales at the Pengchong section, Guangxi, southern China. It is defined by the first appearance of the fusulinid Eoparastaffella simplex in the evolutionary lineage Eoparastaffella ovalis – Eoparastaffella simplex and was ratified in 2009.

The Serpukhovian Stage was proposed in 1890 by Russian stratigrapher Sergei Nikitin. It is named after the city of Serpukhov, near Moscow and currently lacks a defined GSSP. The Visean-Serpukhovian boundary coincides with a major period of glaciation. The resulting sea level fall and climatic changes led to the loss of connections between marine basins and endemism of marine fauna across the Russian margin. This means changes in biota are environmental rather than evolutionary making wider correlation difficult. Work is underway in the Urals and Nashui, Guizhou Province, southwestern China for a suitable site for the GSSP with the proposed definition for the base of the Serpukhovian as the first appearance of conodont Lochriea ziegleri.

==== Pennsylvanian ====
The Pennsylvanian was proposed by J.J.Stevenson in 1888, named after the widespread coal-rich strata found across the state of Pennsylvania. The closure of the Rheic Ocean and formation of Pangea during the Pennsylvanian, together with widespread glaciation across Gondwana led to major climate and sea level changes, which restricted marine fauna to particular geographic areas thereby reducing widespread biostratigraphic correlations. Extensive volcanic events associated with the assembling of Pangea means more radiometric dating is possible relative to the Mississippian.

The Bashkirian Stage was proposed by Russian stratigrapher Sofia Semikhatova in 1934. It was named after Bashkiria, the then Russian name of the republic of Bashkortostan in the southern Ural Mountains of Russia. The GSSP for the base of the Pennsylvanian Subsystem and Bashkirian Stage is located at Arrow Canyon in Nevada, US and was ratified in 1996. It is defined by the first appearance of the conodont Declinognathodus noduliferus. Arrow Canyon lay in a shallow, tropical seaway which stretched from Southern California to Alaska. The boundary is within a cyclothem sequence of transgressive limestones and fine sandstones, and regressive mudstones and brecciated limestones.

The Moscovian Stage is named after shallow marine limestones and colourful clays found around Moscow, Russia. It was first introduced by Sergei Nikitin in 1890. The Moscovian currently lacks a defined GSSP. The fusulinid Aljutovella aljutovica can be used to define the base of the Moscovian across the northern and eastern margins of Pangea, however, it is restricted in geographic area, which means it cannot be used for global correlations. The first appearance of the conodonts Declinognathodus donetzianus or Idiognathoides postsulcatus have been proposed as a boundary marking species and potential sites in the Urals and Nashui, Guizhou Province, southwestern China are being considered.

The Kasimovian is the first stage in the Upper Pennsylvanian. It is named after the Russian city of Kasimov, and was originally included as part of Nikitin's 1890 definition of the Moscovian. It was first recognised as a distinct unit by A.P. Ivanov in 1926, who named it the "Tiguliferina" Horizon after a type of brachiopod. The boundary of the Kasimovian covers a period of globally low sea level, which has resulted in disconformities within many sequences of this age. This has created difficulties in finding suitable marine fauna that can used to correlate boundaries worldwide. The Kasimovian currently lacks a defined GSSP; potential sites in the southern Urals, southwest USA and Nashui, Guizhou Province, southwestern China are being considered.

The Gzhelian is named after the Russian village of Gzhel (selo), Moscow Oblast, near Ramenskoye, not far from Moscow. The name and type locality were defined by Sergei Nikitin in 1890. The Gzhelian currently lacks a defined GSSP. The first appearance of the fusulinid Rauserites rossicus and Rauserites stuckenbergi can be used in the Boreal Sea and Paleo-Tethyan regions but not eastern Pangea or Panthalassa margins. Potential sites in the Urals and Nashui, Guizhou Province, southwestern China for the GSSP are being considered.

The GSSP for the base of the Permian is located in the Aidaralash River valley near Aqtöbe, Kazakhstan and was ratified in 1996. The beginning of the stage is defined by the first appearance of the conodont Streptognathodus postfusus.

=== Cyclothems ===
A cyclothem is a succession of non-marine and marine sedimentary rocks, deposited during a single sedimentary cycle, with an erosional surface at its base. Whilst individual cyclothems are often only metres to a few tens of metres thick, cyclothem sequences can be many hundreds to thousands of metres thick and contain tens to hundreds of individual cyclothems. Cyclothems were deposited along continental shelves where the very gentle gradient of the shelves meant even small changes in sea level led to large advances or retreats of the sea. Cyclothem lithologies vary from mudrock and carbonate-dominated to coarse siliciclastic sediment-dominated sequences depending on the paleo-topography, climate and supply of sediments to the shelf.

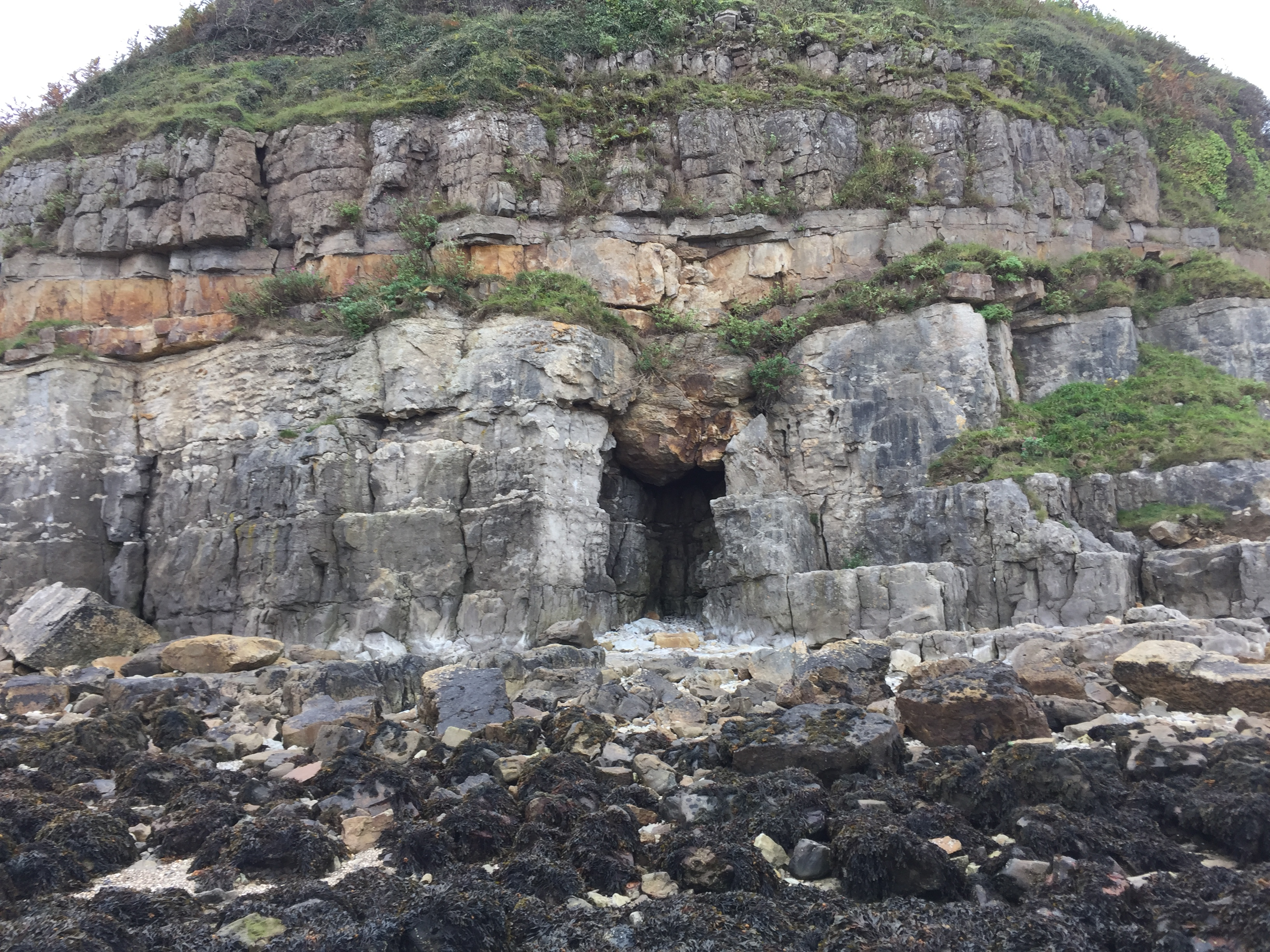
Cliff section through the Serpukhovian Red Wharf Limestone Formation, Wales. A marine limestone at the base of the cliff is overlain by an orange-coloured fluvial sandstone. Subaerial exposure of the limestone during a period of falling sea level resulted in the formation of a karstic surface, which has then been infilled by the river sands. A thin, estuarine silty mudstone overlays the sandstone, which in turn is overlain by a second marine limestone.

The main period of cyclothem deposition occurred during the Late Paleozoic Ice Age from the Late Mississippian to early Permian, when the waxing and waning of ice sheets led to rapid changes in eustatic sea level. The growth of ice sheets led global sea levels to fall as water was locked away in glaciers. Falling sea levels exposed large tracts of the continental shelves across which river systems eroded channels and valleys and vegetation broke down the surface to form soils. The non-marine sediments deposited on this erosional surface form the base of the cyclothem. As sea levels began to rise, the rivers flowed through increasingly water-logged landscapes of swamps and lakes. Peat mires developed in these wet and oxygen-poor conditions, leading to coal formation. With continuing sea level rise, coastlines migrated landward and deltas, lagoons and esturaries developed; their sediments deposited over the peat mires. As fully marine conditions were established, limestones succeeded these marginal marine deposits. The limestones were in turn overlain by deep water black shales as maximum sea levels were reached.

Ideally, this sequence would be reversed as sea levels began to fall again; however, sea level falls tend to be protracted, whilst sea level rises are rapid, ice sheets grow slowly but melt quickly. Therefore, the majority of a cyclothem sequence occurred during falling sea levels, when rates of erosion were high, meaning they were often periods of non-deposition. Erosion during sea level falls could also result in the full or partial removal of previous cyclothem sequences. Individual cyclothems are generally less than 10 m thick because the speed at which sea level rose gave only limited time for sediments to accumulate.

During the Pennsylvanian, cyclothems were deposited in shallow, epicontinental seas across the tropical regions of Laurussia (present day western and central US, Europe, Russia and central Asia) and the North and South China cratons. The rapid sea levels fluctuations they represent correlate with the glacial cycles of the Late Paleozoic Ice Age. The advance and retreat of ice sheets across Gondwana followed a 100 kyr Milankovitch cycle, and so each cyclothem represents a cycle of sea level fall and rise over a 100 kyr period.

=== Coal formation ===
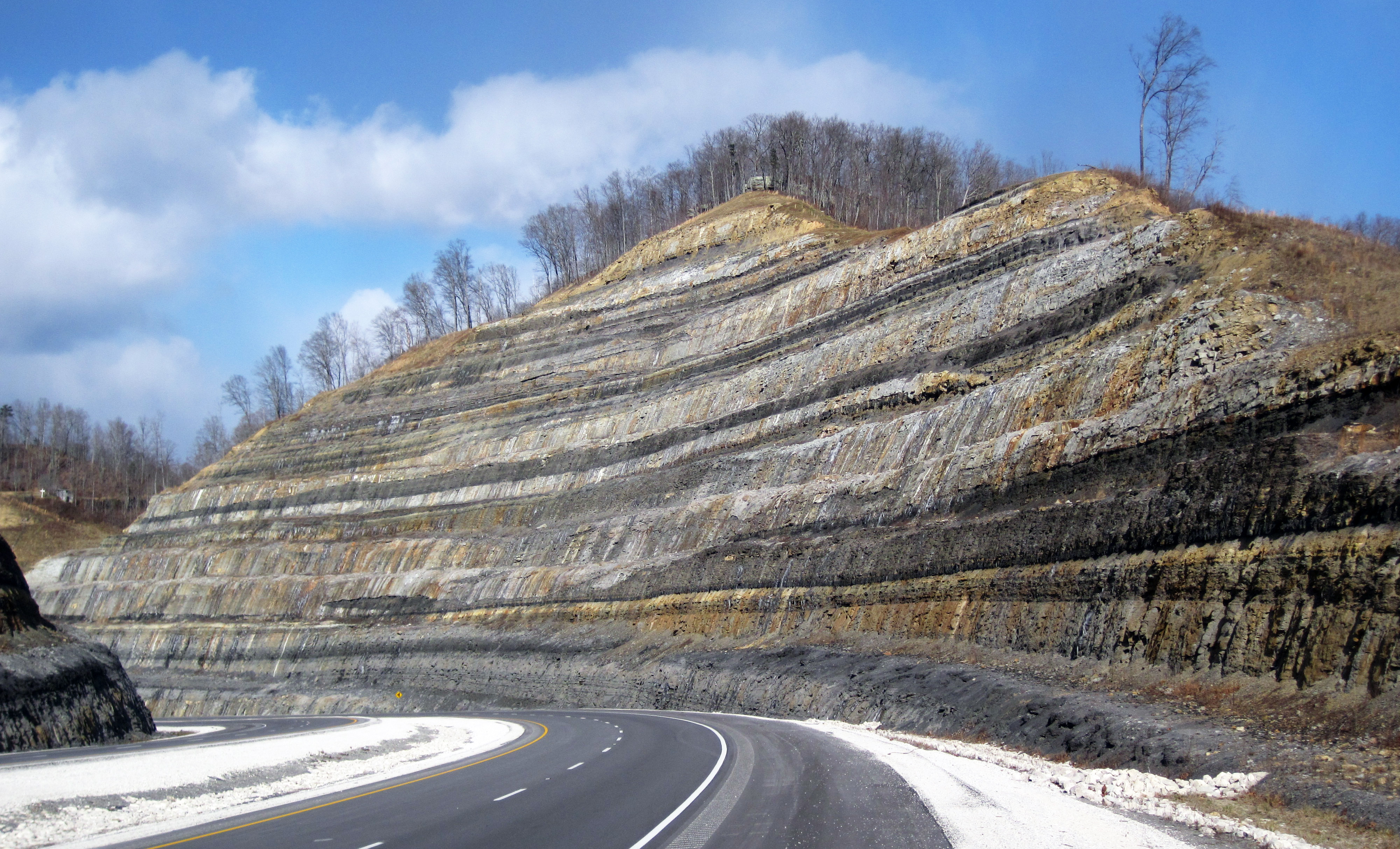
Hyden Formation over Pikeville Formation in the Pennsylvanian of Kentucky, US. The exposure has Pennsylvanian-aged cyclothemic sedimentary rocks of the Breathitt Group. The upper part of the roadcut is Hyden Formation, consisting of mixed siliciclastics and coal. The lower part is Pikeville Formation, also having mixed siliciclastics and coal.

Coal forms when organic matter builds up in waterlogged, anoxic swamps, known as peat mires, and is then buried, compressing the peat into coal. The majority of Earth's coal deposits were formed during the late Carboniferous and early Permian. The plants from which they formed contributed to changes in the Carboniferous Earth's atmosphere.

During the Pennsylvanian, vast amounts of organic debris accumulated in the peat mires that formed across the low-lying, humid equatorial wetlands of the foreland basins of the Central Pangean Mountains in Laurussia, and around the margins of the North and South China cratons. During glacial periods, low sea levels exposed large areas of the continental shelves. Major river channels, up to several kilometres wide, stretched across these shelves feeding a network of smaller channels, lakes and peat mires. These wetlands were then buried by sediment as sea levels rose during interglacials. Continued crustal subsidence of the foreland basins and continental margins allowed this accumulation and burial of peat deposits to continue over millions of years resulting in the formation of thick and widespread coal formations. During the warm interglacials, smaller coal swamps with plants adapted to the temperate conditions formed on the Siberian craton and the western Australian region of Gondwana.

There is ongoing debate as to why this peak in the formation of Earth's coal deposits occurred during the Carboniferous. The first theory, known as the delayed fungal evolution hypothesis, proposes that a delay between the development of trees with the wood fibre lignin and the subsequent evolution of lignin-degrading fungi gave a period of time where vast amounts of lignin-based organic material could accumulate. Genetic analysis of basidiomycete fungi, which have enzymes capable of breaking down lignin, supports this theory by suggesting this fungi evolved in the Permian. However, significant Mesozoic and Cenozoic coal deposits formed after lignin-digesting fungi had become well established, and fungal degradation of lignin may have already evolved by the end of the Devonian, even if the specific enzymes used by basidiomycetes had not. The second theory is that the geographical setting and climate of the Carboniferous were unique in Earth's history: the co-occurrence of the position of the continents across the humid equatorial zone, high biological productivity, and the low-lying, water-logged and slowly subsiding sedimentary basins that allowed the thick accumulation of peat were sufficient to account for the peak in coal formation.

== Palaeogeography ==
During the Carboniferous, there was an increased rate in tectonic plate movements as the supercontinent Pangea assembled. The continents themselves formed a near circle around the opening Paleo-Tethys Ocean, with the massive Panthalassic Ocean beyond. Gondwana covered the south polar region. To its northwest was Laurussia. These two continents slowly collided to form the core of Pangea. To the north of Laurussia lay Siberia and Amuria. To the east of Siberia, Kazakhstania, North China and South China formed the northern margin of the Paleo-Tethys, with Annamia lying to the south.

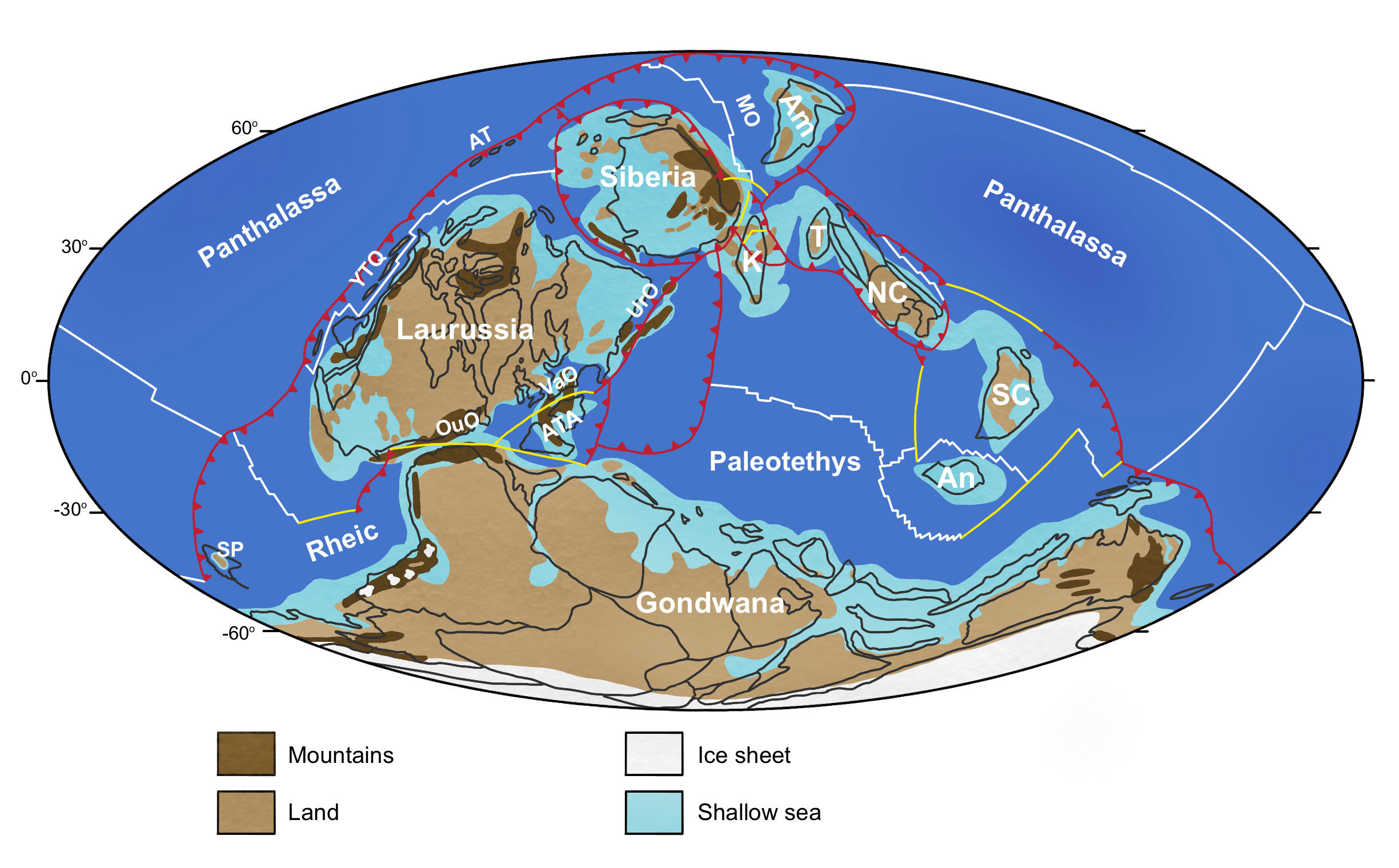
Paleomap showing approximate positions of the continents in the early Carboniferous (c. 348 Ma). AM. Amuria; AN. Annamia; AT. Alexander terrane; ATA. Armorican terrane Assemblage; K. Kazakhstania; MO. Mongol-Okhotsk Ocean; NC. North China; OuO. Ouachita orogen; SC. South China; SP. South Patagonia; T. Tarim; UrO. Uralian orogen; VaO. Variscan orogen; YTQ. Yukon-Tanana and Quesnellia terranes. Plate boundaries: red – subduction; white – ridges; yellow – transform.

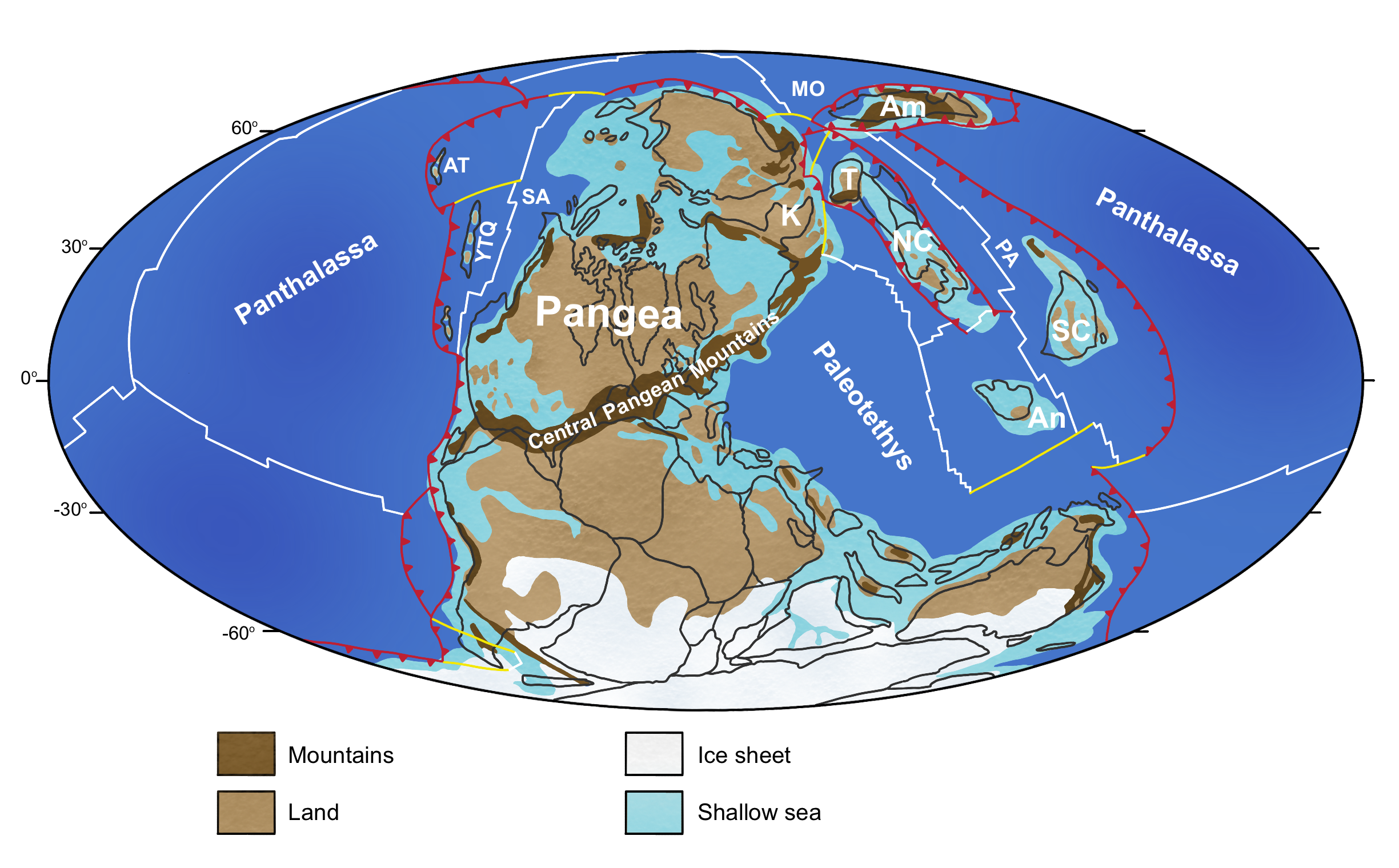
Paleomap showing approximate positions of the continents in the late Carboniferous (c. 302 Ma). AM. Amuria; AN. Annamia; AT. Alexander terrane; K. Kazakhstania; MO. Mongol-Okhotsk Ocean; NC. North China; PA. Paleoasian Ocean; SC. South China; SA. Slide Mountain-Angayucham Ocean; T. Tarim; YTQ. Yukon-Tanana and Quesnellia terranes. Plate boundaries: red – subduction; white – ridges; yellow – transform.

=== Variscan-Alleghanian-Ouachita orogeny ===
The Central Pangean Mountains were formed during the Variscan-Alleghanian-Ouachita orogeny. Today their remains stretch over 10,000 km from the Gulf of Mexico in the west to Turkey in the east. The orogeny was caused by a series of continental collisions between Laurussia, Gondwana and the Armorican terrane assemblage (much of modern-day Central and Western Europe including Iberia) as the Rheic Ocean closed and Pangea formed. This mountain building process began in the Middle Devonian and continued into the early Permian.

The Armorican terranes rifted away from Gondwana during the Late Ordovician. As they drifted northwards the Rheic Ocean closed in front of them, and they began to collide with southeastern Laurussia in the Middle Devonian. The resulting Variscan orogeny involved a complex series of oblique collisions with associated metamorphism, igneous activity, and large-scale deformation between these terranes and Laurussia, which continued into the Carboniferous.

During the mid Carboniferous, the South American sector of Gondwana collided obliquely with Laurussia's southern margin resulting in the Ouachita orogeny. The major strike-slip faulting that occurred between Laurussia and Gondwana extended eastwards into the Appalachian Mountains where early deformation in the Alleghanian orogeny was predominantly strike-slip. As the West African sector of Gondwana collided with Laurussia during the Late Pennsylvanian, deformation along the Alleghanian orogen became northwesterly-directed compression.

=== Uralian orogeny ===
The Uralian orogeny is a north–south trending fold and thrust belt that forms the western edge of the Central Asian Orogenic Belt. The Uralian orogeny began in the Late Devonian and continued, with some hiatuses, into the Jurassic. From the Late Devonian to early Carboniferous, the Magnitogorsk island arc, which lay between Kazakhstania and Laurussia in the Ural Ocean, collided with the passive margin of northeastern Laurussia (Baltica craton). The suture zone between the former island arc complex and the continental margin formed the Main Uralian Fault, a major structure that runs for more than 2,000 km along the orogen. Accretion of the island arc was complete by the Tournaisian, but subduction of the Ural Ocean between Kazakhstania and Laurussia continued until the Bashkirian when the ocean finally closed and continental collision began. Significant strike-slip movement along this zone indicates the collision was oblique. Deformation continued into the Permian and during the late Carboniferous and Permian the region was extensively intruded by granites.

=== Laurussia ===
The Laurussian continent was formed by the collision between Laurentia, Baltica and Avalonia during the Devonian. At the beginning of the Carboniferous, some models show it at the equator, while others place it further south. In either case, the continent drifted northwards, reaching low latitudes in the northern hemisphere by the end of the Period. The Central Pangean Mountain drew in moist air from the Paleo-Tethys Ocean resulting in heavy precipitation and a tropical wetland environment. Extensive coal deposits developed within the cyclothem sequences that dominated the Pennsylvanian sedimentary basins associated with the growing orogenic belt.

Subduction of the Panthalassic oceanic plate along its western margin resulted in the Antler orogeny in the Late Devonian to Early Mississippian. Further north along the margin, slab roll-back, beginning in the Early Mississippian, led to the rifting of the Yukon–Tanana terrane and the opening of the Slide Mountain Ocean. Along the northern margin of Laurussia, orogenic collapse of the Late Devonian to Early Mississippian Innuitian orogeny led to the development of the Sverdrup Basin.

=== Gondwana ===
Much of Gondwana lay in the southern polar region during the Carboniferous. As the plate moved, the South Pole drifted from southern Africa in the early Carboniferous to eastern Antarctica by the end of the period. Glacial deposits are widespread across Gondwana and indicate multiple ice centres and long-distance movement of ice. The northern to northeastern margin of Gondwana (northeast Africa, Arabia, India and northeastern West Australia) was a passive margin along the southern edge of the Paleo-Tethys with cyclothem deposition including, during more temperate intervals, coal swamps in Western Australia. The Mexican terranes along the northwestern Gondwana margin, were affected by the subduction of the Rheic Ocean. However, they lay to west of the Ouachita orogeny and were not impacted by continental collision but became part of the active margin of the Pacific. The Moroccan margin was affected by periods of widespread dextral strike-slip deformation, magmatism and metamorphism associated with the Variscan orogeny.

Towards the end of the Carboniferous, extension and rifting across the northern margin of Gondwana led to the breaking away of the Cimmerian terrane during the early Permian and the opening of the Neo-Tethys Ocean. Along the southeastern and southern margin of Gondwana (eastern Australia and Antarctica), northward subduction of Panthalassa continued. Changes in the relative motion of the plates resulted in the early Carboniferous Kanimblan Orogeny. Continental arc magmatism continued into the late Carboniferous and extended round to connect with the developing proto-Andean subduction zone along the western South American margin of Gondwana.

=== Siberia and Amuria ===
Shallow seas covered much of the Siberian craton in the early Carboniferous. These retreated as sea levels fell in the Pennsylvanian and as the continent drifted north into more temperate zones extensive coal deposits formed in the Kuznetsk Basin. The northwest to eastern margins of Siberia were passive margins along the Mongol-Okhotsk Ocean on the far side of which lay Amuria. From the mid Carboniferous, subduction zones with associated magmatic arcs developed along both margins of the ocean.

The southwestern margin of Siberia was the site of a long lasting and complex accretionary orogen. The Devonian to early Carboniferous Siberian and South Chinese Altai accretionary complexes developed above an east-dipping subduction zone, whilst further south, the Zharma-Saur arc formed along the northeastern margin of Kazakhstania. By the late Carboniferous, all these complexes had accreted to the Siberian craton as shown by the intrusion of post-orogenic granites across the region. As Kazakhstania had already accreted to Laurussia, Siberia was effectively part of Pangea by 310 Ma, although major strike-slip movements continued between it and Laurussia into the Permian.

=== Central and East Asia ===
The Kazakhstanian microcontinent is composed of a series of Devonian and older accretionary complexes. It was strongly deformed during the Carboniferous as its western margin collided with Laurussia during the Uralian orogen and its northeastern margin collided with Siberia. Continuing strike-slip motion between Laurussia and Siberia led the formerly elongate microcontinent to bend into an orocline.

During the Carboniferous, the Tarim craton lay along the northwestern edge of North China. Subduction along the Kazakhstanian margin of the Turkestan Ocean resulted in collision between northern Tarim and Kazakhstania during the mid Carboniferous as the ocean closed. The South Tian Shan fold and thrust belt, which extends over 2,000 km from Uzbekistan to northwest China, is the remains of this accretionary complex and forms the suture between Kazakhstania and Tarim. A continental magmatic arc above a south-dipping subduction zone lay along the northern North China margin, consuming the Paleoasian Ocean. Northward subduction of the Paleo-Tethys beneath the southern margins of North China and Tarim continued during the Carboniferous, with the South Qinling block accreted to North China during the mid to late Carboniferous. No sediments are preserved from the early Carboniferous in North China. However, bauxite deposits immediately above the regional mid Carboniferous unconformity indicate warm tropical conditions and are overlain by cyclothems including extensive coals.

South China and Annamia (Southeast Asia) rifted from Gondwana during the Devonian. During the Carboniferous, they were separated from each other and North China by the Paleoasian Ocean with the Paleo-Tethys to the southwest and Panthalassa to the northeast. Cyclothem sediments with coal and evaporites were deposited across the passive margins that surrounded both continents.

== Climate ==
The Carboniferous climate was dominated by the Late Paleozoic Ice Age (LPIA), the most extensive and longest icehouse period of the Phanerozoic, which lasted from the Late Devonian to the Permian (365 Ma-253 Ma). Temperatures began to drop during the late Devonian with a short-lived glaciation in the late Famennian through Devonian–Carboniferous boundary, before the Early Tournaisian Warm Interval. Following this, a reduction in atmospheric CO_{2} levels, caused by the increased burial of organic matter and widespread ocean anoxia led to climate cooling and glaciation across the south polar region. During the Visean Warm Interval glaciers nearly vanished retreating to the proto-Andes in Bolivia and western Argentina and the Pan-African mountain ranges in southeastern Brazil and southwest Africa.

The main phase of the LPIA (c. 335–290 Ma) began in the late Visean, as the climate cooled and atmospheric CO_{2} levels dropped. Its onset was accompanied by a global fall in sea level and widespread multimillion-year unconformities. This main phase consisted of a series of discrete several million-year-long glacial periods during which ice expanded out from up to 30 ice centres that stretched across mid- to high latitudes of Gondwana in eastern Australia, northwestern Argentina, southern Brazil, and central and Southern Africa.

Isotope records indicate this drop in CO_{2} levels was triggered by tectonic factors with increased weathering of the growing Central Pangean Mountains and the influence of the mountains on precipitation and surface water flow. Closure of the oceanic gateway between the Rheic and Tethys oceans in the early Bashkirian also contributed to climate cooling by changing ocean circulation and heat flow patterns.

Warmer periods with reduced ice volume within the Bashkirian, the late Moscovian and the latest Kasimovian to mid-Gzhelian are inferred from the disappearance of glacial sediments, the appearance of deglaciation deposits and rises in sea levels.

In the early Kasimovian there was short-lived (<1 million years) intense period of glaciation, with atmospheric CO_{2} concentration levels dropping as low as 180 ppm. This ended suddenly as a rapid increase in CO_{2} concentrations to c. 600 ppm resulted in a warmer climate. This rapid rise in CO_{2} may have been due to a peak in pyroclastic volcanism and/or a reduction in burial of terrestrial organic matter.

The LPIA peaked across the Carboniferous-Permian boundary. Widespread glacial deposits are found across South America, western and central Africa, Antarctica, Australia, Tasmania, the Arabian Peninsula, India, and the Cimmerian blocks, indicating trans-continental ice sheets across southern Gondwana that reached to sea-level. In response to the uplift and erosion of the more mafic basement rocks of the Central Pangea Mountains at this time, CO_{2} levels dropped as low as 175 ppm and remained under 400 ppm for 10 Ma.

=== Temperatures ===
Temperatures across the Carboniferous reflect the phases of the LPIA. At the extremes, during the Permo-Carboniferous Glacial Maximum (299–293 Ma) the global average temperature (GAT) was c. 13 °C (55 °F), the average temperature in the tropics c. 24 °C (75 °F) and in polar regions c. -23 °C (-10 °F), whilst during the Early Tournaisian Warm Interval (358–353 Ma) the GAT was c. 22 °C (72 °F), the tropics c. 30 °C (86 °F) and polar regions c. 1.5 °C (35 °F). Overall, for the Ice Age the GAT was c. 17 °C (62 °F), with tropical temperatures c. 26 °C and polar temperatures c. -9.0 °C (16 °F).

=== Atmospheric oxygen levels ===
There are a variety of methods for reconstructing past atmospheric oxygen levels, including the charcoal record, halite gas inclusions, burial rates of organic carbon and pyrite, carbon isotopes of organic material, isotope mass balance and forward modelling. Depending on the preservation of source material, some techniques represent moments in time (e.g. halite gas inclusions), whilst others have a wider time range (e.g. the charcoal record and pyrite). Results from these different methods for the Carboniferous vary. For example: the increasing occurrence of charcoal produced by wildfires from the Late Devonian into the Carboniferous indicates increasing oxygen levels, with calculations showing oxygen levels above 21% for most of the Carboniferous; halite gas inclusions from sediments dated 337–335 Ma give estimates for the Visean of c. 15.3%, although with large uncertainties; and, pyrite records suggest levels of c. 15% early in the Carboniferous, to over 25% during the Pennsylvanian, before dropping back below 20% towards the end. However, whilst exact numbers vary, all models show an overall increase in atmospheric oxygen levels from a low of between 15 and 20% at the beginning of the Carboniferous to highs of 25–30% during the Period. This was not a steady rise, but included peaks and troughs reflecting the dynamic climate conditions of the time. How the atmospheric oxygen concentrations influenced the large body size of arthropods and other fauna and flora during the Carboniferous is also a subject of ongoing debate.

=== Effects of climate on sedimentation ===
The changing climate was reflected in regional-scale changes in sedimentation patterns. In the relatively warm waters of the Early to Middle Mississippian, carbonate production occurred to depth across the gently dipping continental slopes of Laurussia and North and South China (carbonate ramp architecture) and evaporites formed around the coastal regions of Laurussia, Kazakhstania, and northern Gondwana.

From the late Visean, the cooling climate restricted carbonate production to depths of less than c. 10 m forming carbonate shelves with flat-tops and steep sides. By the Moscovian, the waxing and waning of the ice sheets led to cyclothem deposition with mixed carbonate-siliciclastic sequences deposited on continental platforms and shelves.

Seasonal melting of glaciers resulted in near freezing waters around the margins of Gondwana. This is evidenced by the occurrence of glendonite (a pseudomorph of ikaite; a form of calcite deposited in glacial waters) in fine-grained, shallow marine sediments.

The glacial grinding and erosion of siliciclastic rocks across Gondwana and the Central Pangaean Mountains produced vast amounts of silt-sized sediment. Redistributed by the wind, this formed widespread deposits of loess across equatorial Pangea.

=== Effects of climate on biodiversity ===
The main phase of the LPIA was considered a crisis for marine biodiversity with the loss of many genera, followed by low biodiversity. However, recent studies of marine life suggest the rapid climate and environmental changes that accompanied the onset of the main glacial phase resulted in an adaptive radiation with a rapid increase in the number of species.

The oscillating climate conditions also led to repeated restructuring of Laurasian tropical forests between wetlands and seasonally dry ecosystems, and the appearance and diversification of tetrapods species. There was a major restructuring of wetland forests during the Kasimovian glacial interval, with the loss of arborescent (tree-like) lycopisids and other wetland groups, and a general decline in biodiversity. These events are attributed to the drop in CO_{2} levels below 400 ppm. Although referred to as the Carboniferous rainforest collapse, this was a complex replacement of one type of rainforest by another, not a complete disappearance of rainforest vegetation.

Across the Carboniferous–Permian boundary interval, a rapid drop in CO_{2} levels and increasingly arid conditions at low-latitudes led to a permanent shift to seasonally dry woodland vegetation. Tetrapods acquired new terrestrial adaptations and there was a radiation of dryland-adapted amniotes.

== Geochemistry ==
As the continents assembled to form Pangea, the growth of the Central Pangean Mountains led to increased weathering and carbonate sedimentation on the ocean floor, whilst the distribution of continents across the paleo-tropics meant vast areas of land were available for the spread of tropical rainforests. Together these two factors significantly increased CO_{2} drawdown from the atmosphere, lowering global temperatures, increasing ocean pH and triggering the Late Paleozoic Ice Age. The growth of the supercontinent also changed seafloor spreading rates and led to a decrease in the length and volume of mid-ocean ridge systems.

=== Magnesium/calcium isotope ratios in seawater ===
During the early Carboniferous, the Mg^{2+}/Ca^{2+} ratio in seawater began to rise and by the Middle Mississippian aragonite seas had replaced calcite seas. The concentration of calcium in seawater is largely controlled by ocean pH, and as this increased the calcium concentration was reduced. At the same time, the increase in weathering, increased the amount of magnesium entering the marine environment. As magnesium is removed from seawater and calcium added along mid-ocean ridges where seawater reacts with the newly formed lithosphere, the reduction in length of mid-ocean ridge systems increased the Mg^{2+}/Ca^{2+} ratio further. The Mg^{2+}/Ca^{2+} ratio of the seas also affects the ability of organisms to biomineralize. The Carboniferous aragonite seas favoured those that secreted aragonite and the dominant reef builders of the time were aragonitic sponges and corals.

=== Strontium isotopic composition of seawater ===
The strontium isotopic composition (^{87}Sr/^{86}Sr) of seawater represents a mix of strontium derived from continental weathering which is rich in ^{87}Sr and from mantle sources e.g. mid-ocean ridges, which are relatively depleted in ^{87}Sr. ^{87}Sr/^{86}Sr ratios above 0.7075 indicate continental weathering is the main source of ^{87}Sr, whilst ratios below indicate mantle-derived sources are the principal contributor.

^{87}Sr/^{86}Sr values varied through the Carboniferous, although they remained above 0.775, indicating continental weathering dominated as the source of ^{87}Sr throughout. The ^{87}Sr/^{86}Sr during the Tournaisian was c. 0.70840, it decreased through the Visean to 0.70771 before increasing during the Serpukhovian to the lowermost Gzhelian where it plateaued at 0.70827, before decreasing again to 0.70814 at the Carboniferous-Permian boundary. These variations reflect the changing influence of weathering and sediment supply to the oceans of the growing Central Pangean Mountains. By the Serpukhovian basement rocks, such as granite, had been uplifted and exposed to weathering. The decline towards the end of the Carboniferous is interpreted as a decrease in continental weathering due to the more arid conditions.

=== Oxygen and carbon isotope ratios in seawater ===
Unlike Mg^{2+}/Ca^{2+} and ^{87}Sr/^{86}Sr isotope ratios, which are consistent across the world's oceans at any one time, δ^{18}O and δ^{13}C preserved in the fossil record can be affected by regional factors. Carboniferous δ^{18}O and δ^{13}C records show regional differences between the South China open-water setting and the epicontinental seas of Laurussia. These differences are due to variations in seawater salinity and evaporation between epicontinental seas relative to the more open waters. However, large scale trends can still be determined. δ^{13}C rose rapidly from c. 0 to 1‰ (parts per thousand) to c. 5 to 7‰ in the Early Mississippian and remained high for the duration of the Late Paleozoic Ice Age (c. 3–6‰) into the early Permian. Similarly from the Early Mississippian there was a long-term increase in δ^{18}O values as the climate cooled.

Both δ^{13}C and δ^{18}O records show significant global isotope changes (known as excursions) during the Carboniferous. The mid-Tournaisian positive δ^{13}C and δ^{18}O excursions lasted between 6 and 10 million years and were also accompanied by c. 6‰ positive excursion in organic matter δ^{15}N values, a negative excursion in carbonate δ^{238}U and a positive excursion in carbonate-associated sulphate δ^{34}S. These changes in seawater geochemistry are interpreted as a decrease in atmospheric CO_{2} due to increased organic matter burial and widespread ocean anoxia triggering climate cooling and onset of glaciation.

The Mississippian-Pennsylvanian boundary positive δ^{18}O excursion occurred at the same time as global sea level falls and widespread glacial deposits across southern Gondwana, indicating climate cooling and ice build-up. The rise in ^{87}Sr/^{86}Sr just before the δ^{18}O excursion suggests climate cooling in this case was caused by increased continental weathering of the growing Central Pangean Mountains and the influence of the orogeny on precipitation and surface water flow rather than increased burial of organic matter. δ^{13}C values show more regional variation, and it is unclear whether there is a positive δ^{13}C excursion or a readjustment from previous lower values.

During the early Kasimovian there was a short (<1myr), intense glacial period, which came to a sudden end as atmospheric CO_{2} concentrations rapidly rose. There was a steady increase in arid conditions across tropical regions and a major reduction in the extent of tropical rainforests, as shown by the widespread loss of coal deposits from this time. The resulting reduction in productivity and burial of organic matter led to increasing atmospheric CO_{2} levels, which were recorded by a negative δ^{13}C excursion and an accompanying, but smaller decrease in δ^{18}O values.

== Life ==
=== Plants ===
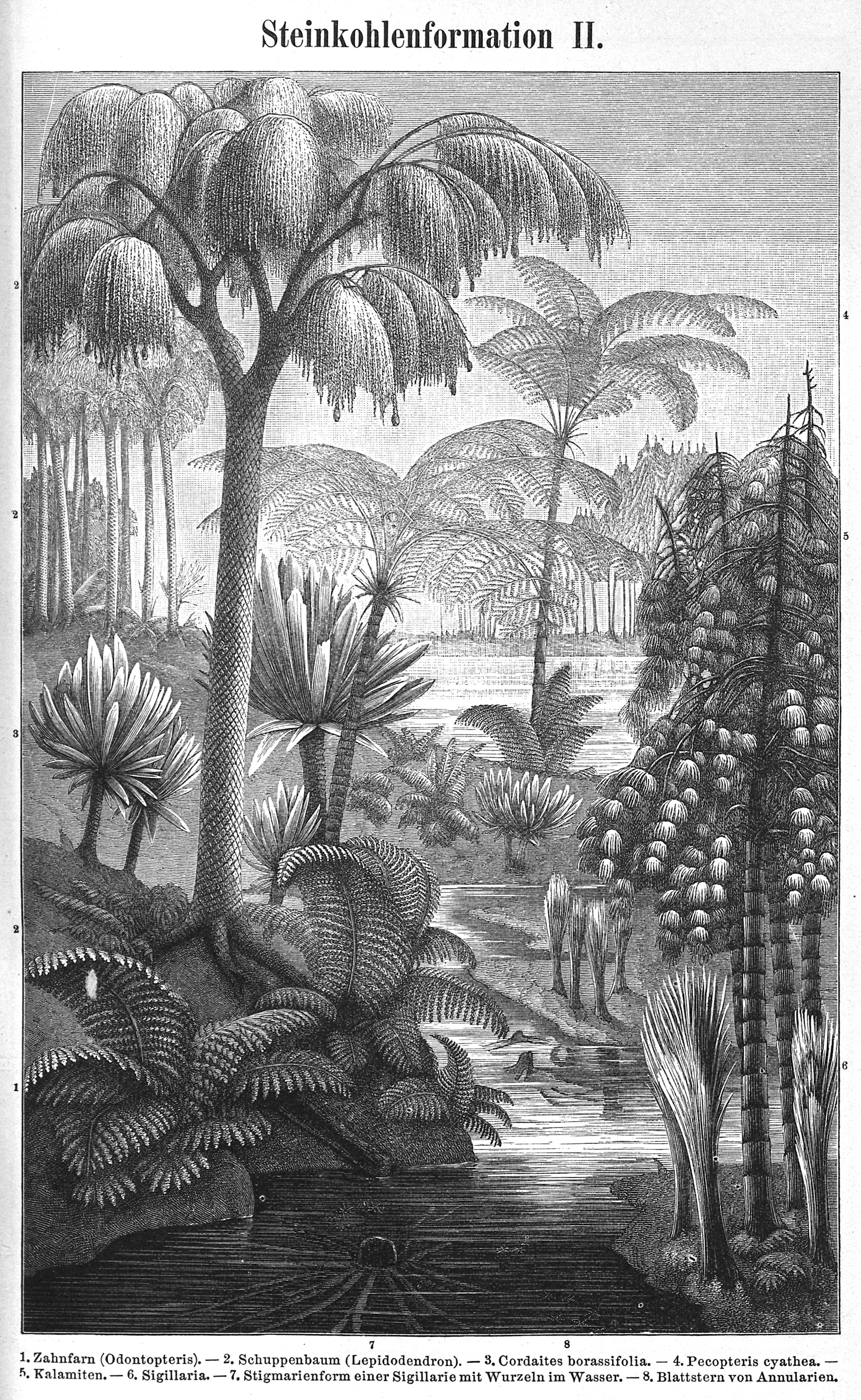
Etching depicting some of the most significant plants of the Carboniferous

Early Carboniferous land plants, some of which were preserved in coal balls, were very similar to those of the preceding Late Devonian, but new groups also appeared at this time. The main early Carboniferous plants were the Equisetales (horse-tails), Sphenophyllales (scrambling plants), Lycopodiales (club mosses), Lepidodendrales (scale trees), Filicales (ferns), Medullosales (informally included in the "seed ferns", an assemblage of a number of early gymnosperm groups) and the Cordaitales. These continued to dominate throughout the period, but during the late Carboniferous, several other groups, Cycadophyta (cycads), the Callistophytales (another group of "seed ferns"), and the Voltziales, appeared.

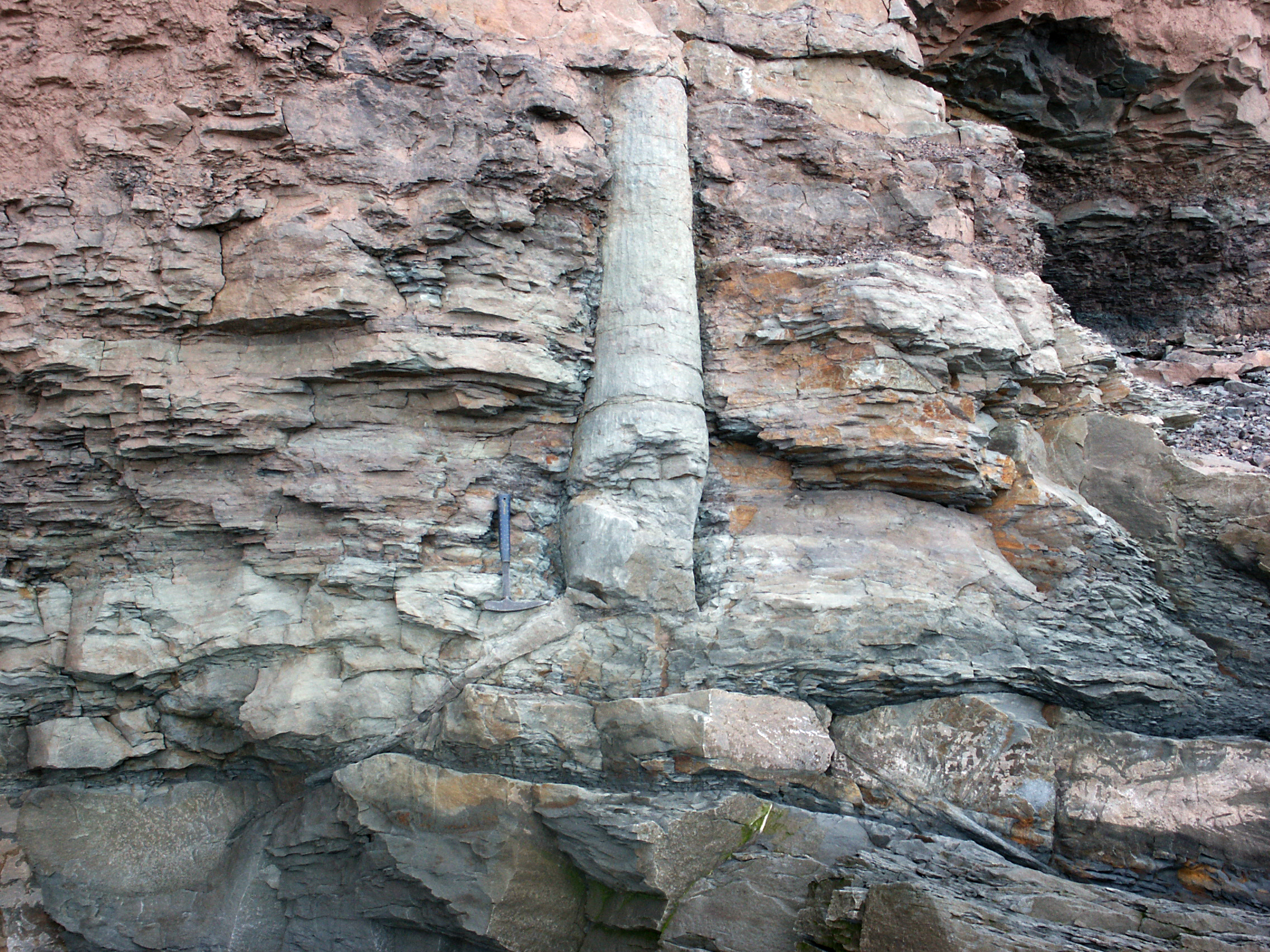
Ancient in situ lycopsid, probably Sigillaria, with attached stigmarian roots, Joggins Formation, Canada

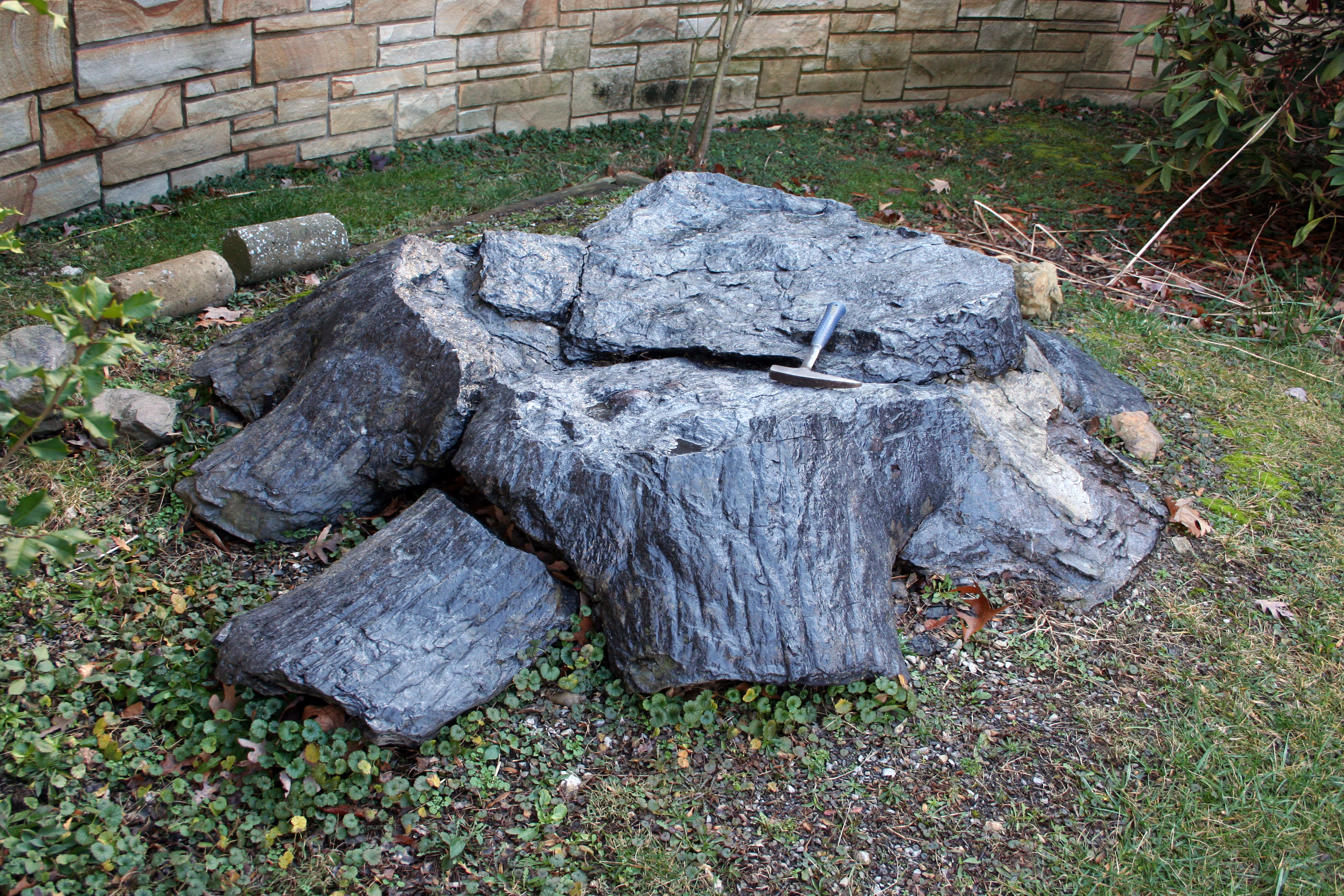
Base of a lycopsid showing connection with bifurcating stigmarian roots

The Carboniferous lycophytes of the order Lepidodendrales, which are cousins (but not ancestors) of the tiny club-moss of today, were huge trees with trunks 30 meters high and up to 1.5 meters in diameter. These included Lepidodendron (with its cone called Lepidostrobus), Anabathra, Lepidophloios and Sigillaria. The roots of several of these forms are known as Stigmaria. Unlike present-day trees, their secondary growth took place in the cortex, which also provided stability, instead of the xylem. The Cladoxylopsids were large trees, that were ancestors of ferns, first arising in the Carboniferous.

The fronds of some Carboniferous ferns are almost identical with those of living species. Probably many species were epiphytic. Fossil ferns and "seed ferns" include Pecopteris, Cyclopteris, Neuropteris, Alethopteris, and Sphenopteris; Megaphyton and Caulopteris were tree ferns.

The Equisetales included the common giant form Calamites, with a trunk diameter of 30 to 60 cm (24 in) and a height of up to 20 m (66 ft). Sphenophyllum was a slender climbing plant with whorls of leaves, which was probably related both to the calamites and the lycopods.

Cordaites, a tall plant (6 to over 30 meters) with strap-like leaves, was related to the cycads and conifers; the catkin-like reproductive organs, which bore ovules/seeds, is called Cardiocarpus. These plants were thought to live in swamps. True coniferous trees (Walchia, of the order Voltziales) appear later in the Carboniferous, and preferred higher drier ground.

=== Marine invertebrates ===
In the oceans the marine invertebrate groups are the Foraminifera, corals, Bryozoa, Ostracoda, brachiopods, ammonoids, hederelloids, microconchids and echinoderms (especially crinoids). The diversity of brachiopods and fusilinid foraminiferans, surged beginning in the Visean, continuing through the end of the Carboniferous, although cephalopod and nektonic conodont diversity declined. This evolutionary radiation was known as the Carboniferous-Earliest Permian Biodiversification Event. For the first time foraminifera took a prominent part in the marine faunae. The large spindle-shaped genus Fusulina and its relatives were abundant in what is now Russia, China, Japan, North America; other important genera include Valvulina, Endothyra, Archaediscus, and Saccammina (the latter common in Britain and Belgium). Some Carboniferous genera are still extant. The first true priapulids appeared during this period.

The microscopic shells of radiolarians are found in cherts of this age in the Culm of Devon and Cornwall, and in Russia, Germany and elsewhere. Sponges are known from spicules and anchor ropes, and include various forms such as the Calcispongea Cotyliscus and Girtycoelia, the demosponge Chaetetes, and the genus of unusual colonial glass sponges Titusvillia. Both reef-building and solitary corals diversify and flourish; these include both rugose (for example, Caninia, Corwenia, Neozaphrentis), heterocorals, and tabulate (for example, Chladochonus, Michelinia) forms. Conularids were well represented by Conularia

Bryozoa are abundant in some regions; the fenestellids including Fenestella, Polypora, and Archimedes, so named because it is in the shape of an Archimedean screw. Brachiopods are also abundant; they include productids, some of which reached very large for brachiopods size and had very thick shells (for example, the 30 cm (12 in)-wide Gigantoproductus), while others like Chonetes were more conservative in form. Athyridids, spiriferids, rhynchonellids, and terebratulids are also very common. Inarticulate forms include Discina and Crania. Some species and genera had a very wide distribution with only minor variations.

Annelids such as Serpulites are common fossils in some horizons. Among the mollusca, the bivalves continue to increase in numbers and importance. Typical genera include Aviculopecten, Posidonomya, Nucula, Carbonicola, Edmondia, and Modiola. Gastropods are also numerous, including the genera Murchisonia, Euomphalus, Naticopsis. Nautiloid cephalopods are represented by tightly coiled nautilids, with straight-shelled and curved-shelled forms becoming increasingly rare. Goniatite ammonoids such as Aenigmatoceras are common.

Trilobites are rarer than in previous periods, on a steady trend towards extinction, represented only by the proetid group. Ostracoda, a class of crustaceans, were abundant as representatives of the meiobenthos; genera included Amphissites, Bairdia, Beyrichiopsis, Cavellina, Coryellina, Cribroconcha, Hollinella, Kirkbya, Knoxiella, and Libumella. Crinoids were highly numerous during the Carboniferous, though they suffered a gradual decline in diversity during the Middle Mississippian. Dense submarine thickets of long-stemmed crinoids appear to have flourished in shallow seas, and their remains were consolidated into thick beds of rock. Prominent genera include Cyathocrinus, Woodocrinus, and Actinocrinus. Echinoids such as Archaeocidaris and Palaeechinus were also present. The blastoids, which included the Pentreinitidae and Codasteridae and superficially resembled crinoids in the possession of long stalks attached to the seabed, attain their maximum development at this time.

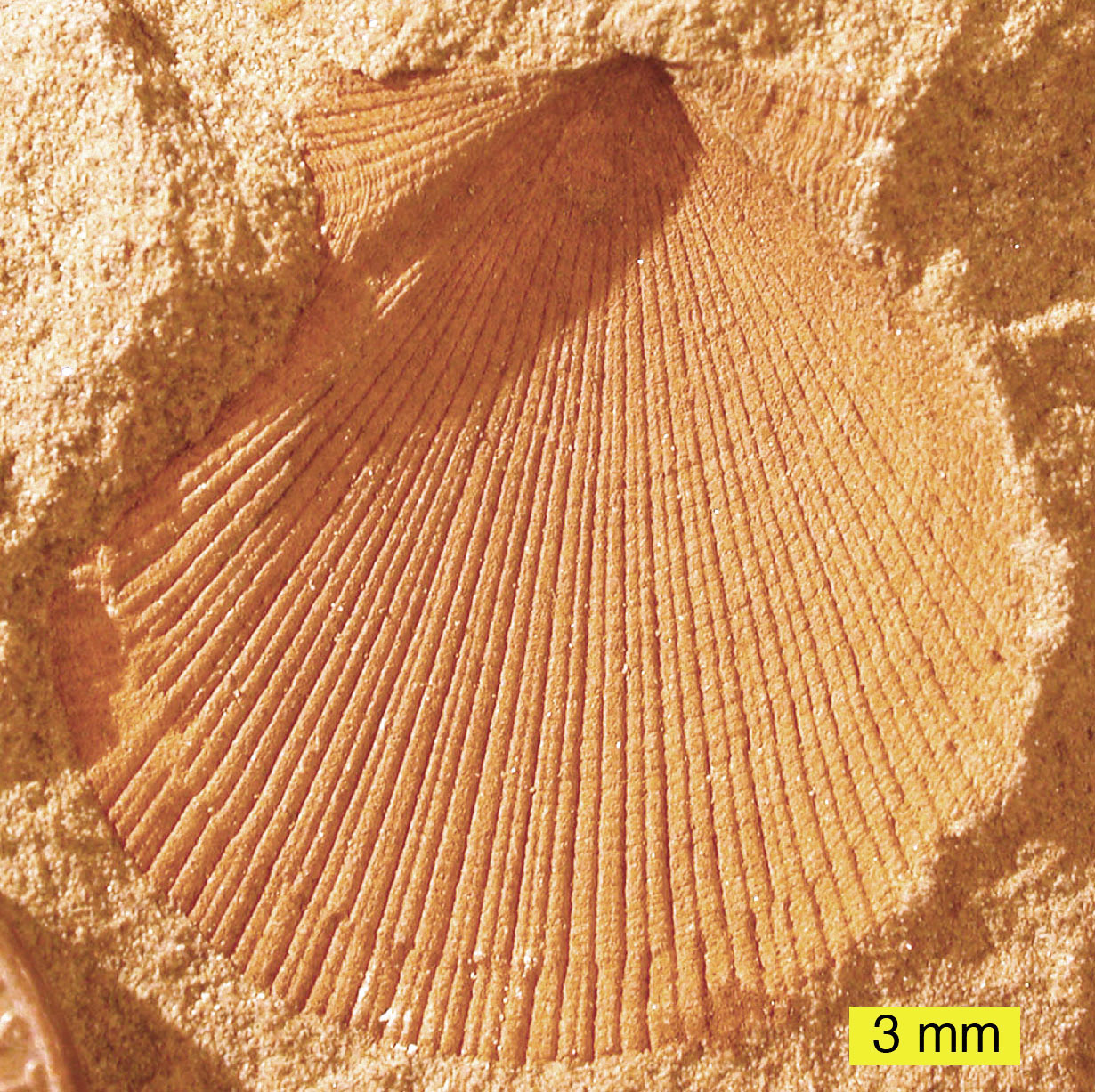
Aviculopecten subcardiformis; a bivalve from the Logan Formation (lower Carboniferous) of Wooster, Ohio (external mold)

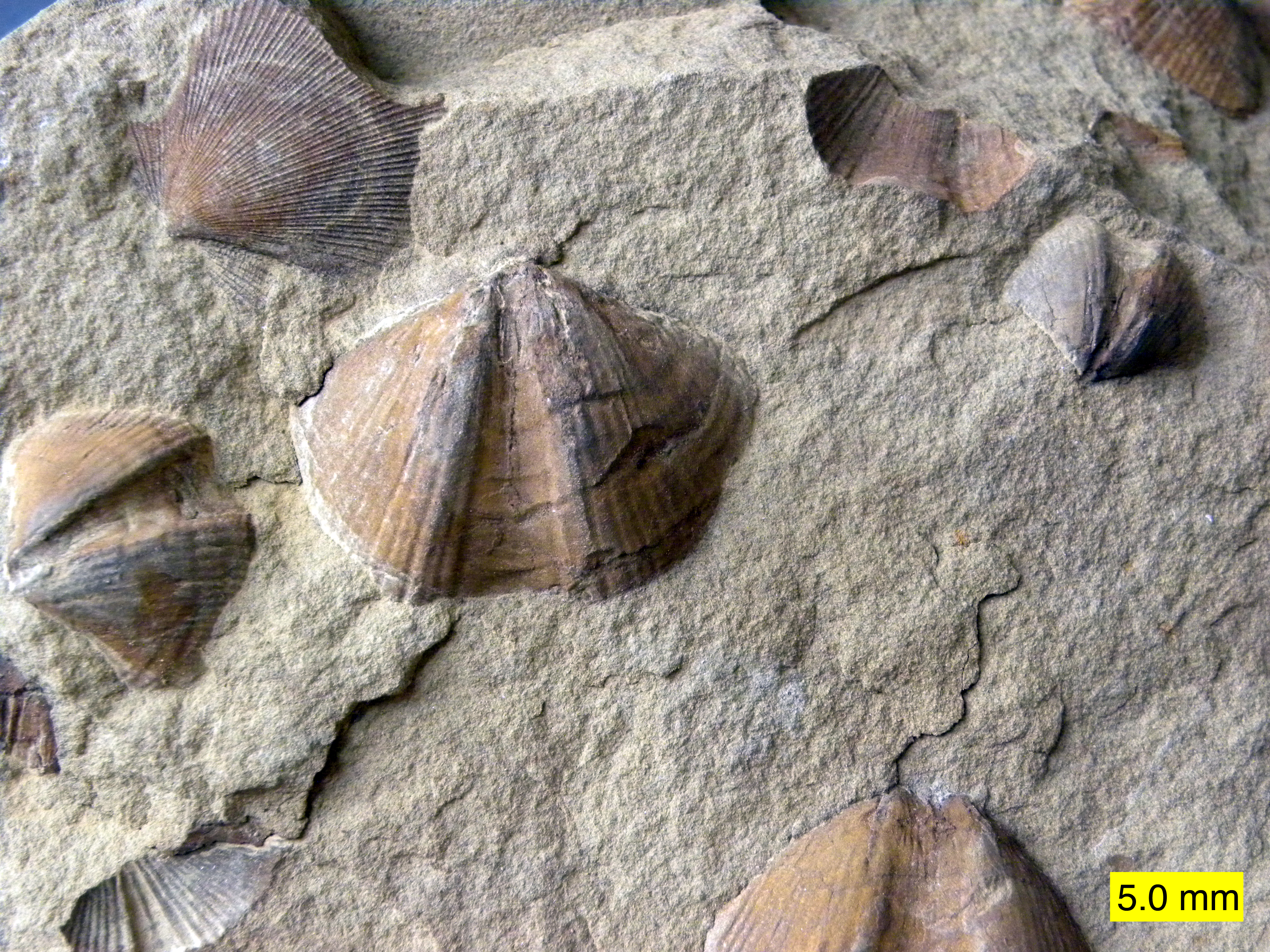
Bivalves (Aviculopecten) and brachiopods (Syringothyris) in the Logan Formation (lower Carboniferous) in Wooster, Ohio

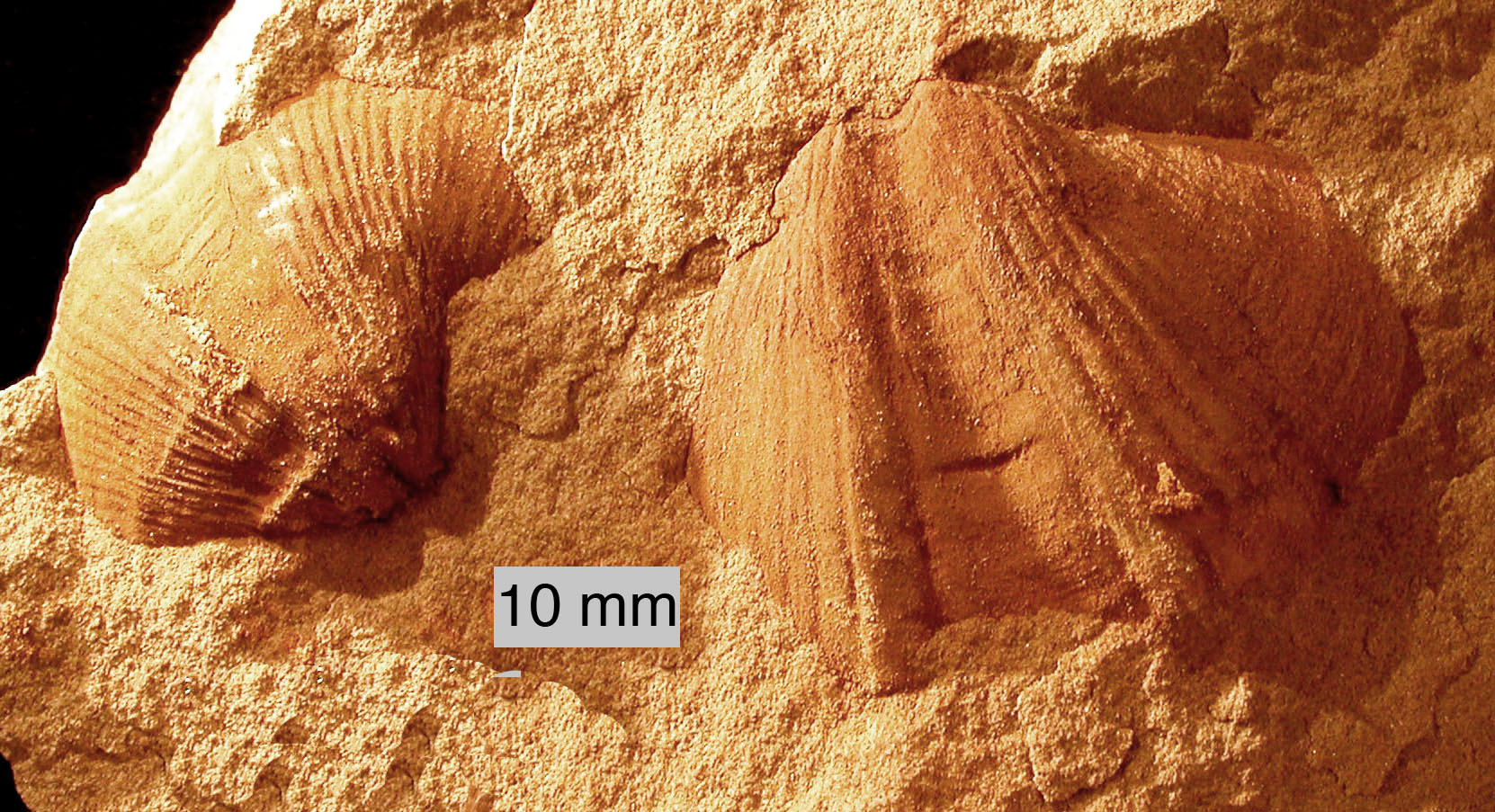
Syringothyris sp.; a spiriferid brachiopod from the Logan Formation (lower Carboniferous) of Wooster, Ohio (internal mold)

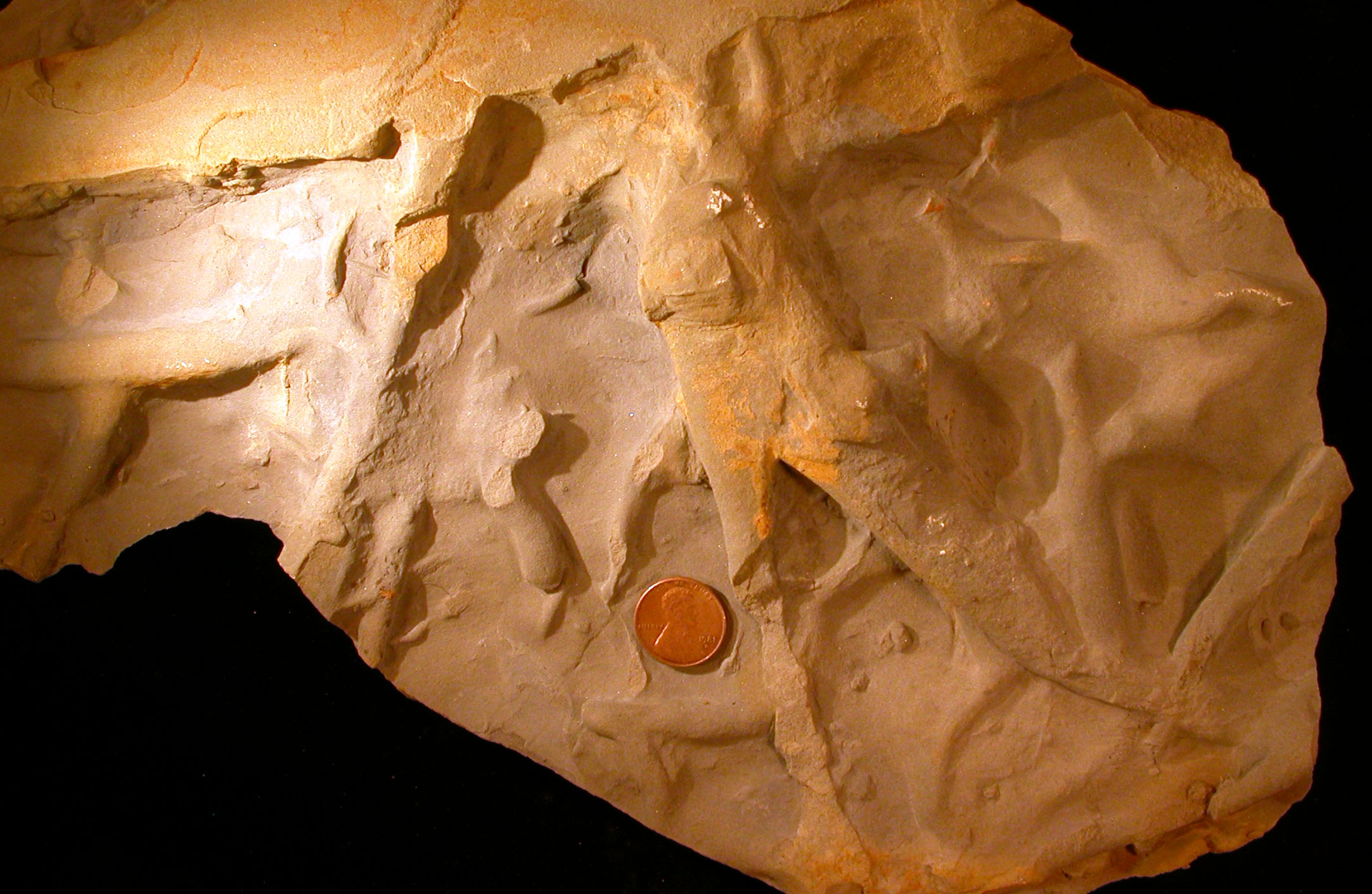
Palaeophycus ichnosp.; a trace fossil from the Logan Formation (lower Carboniferous) of Wooster, Ohio

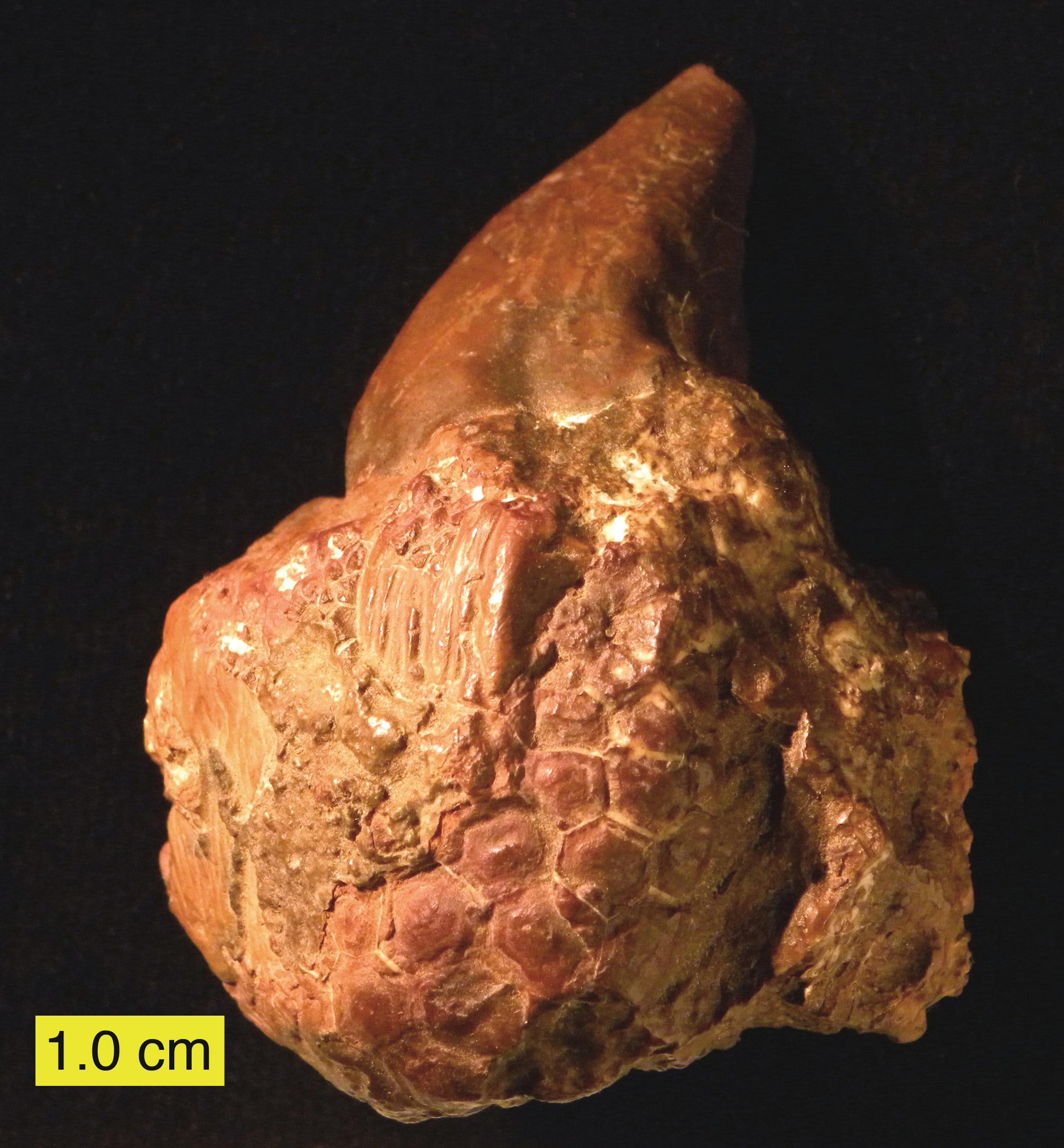
Crinoid calyx from the lower Carboniferous of Ohio with a conical platyceratid gastropod (Palaeocapulus acutirostre) attached

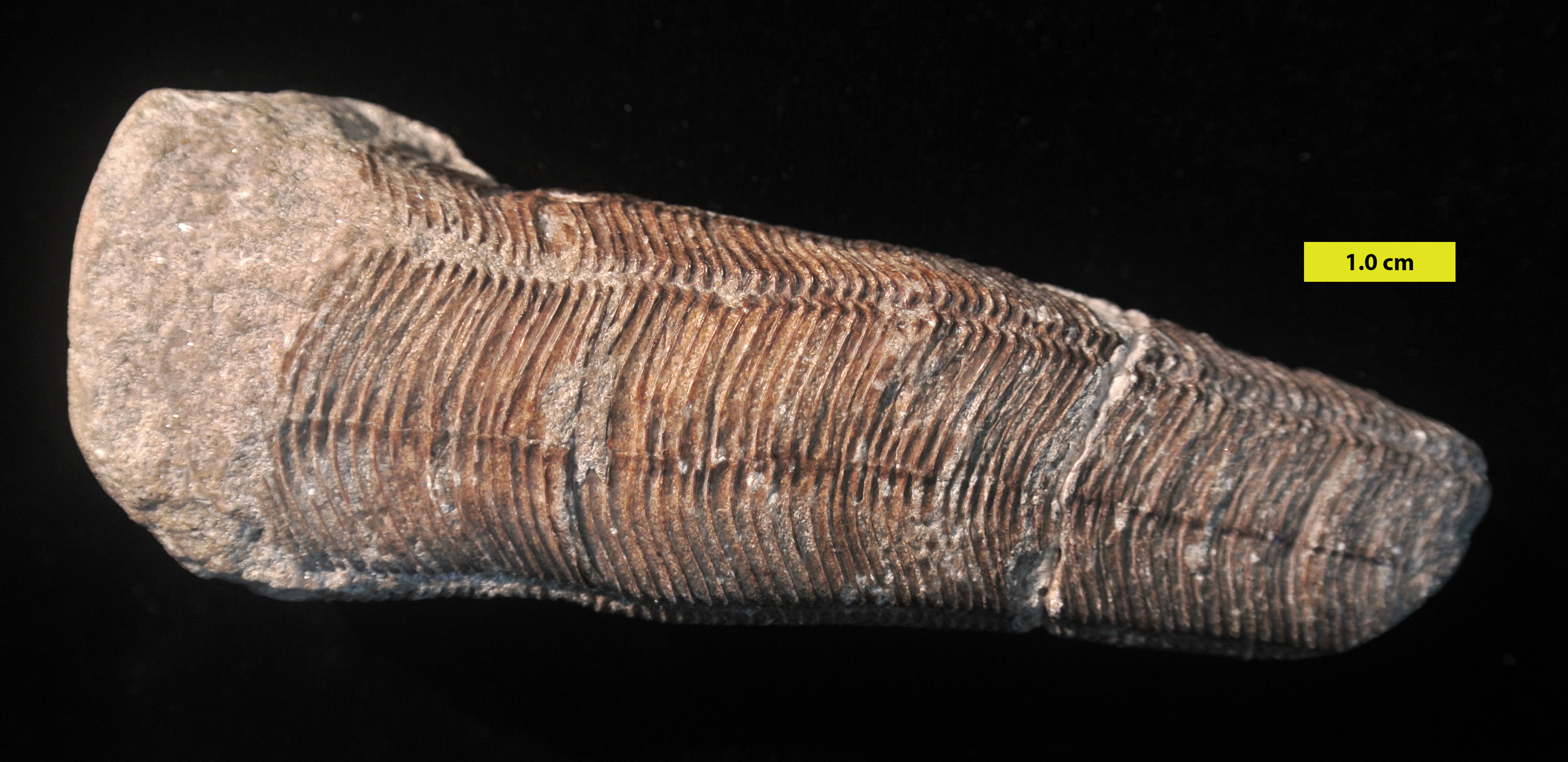
Conulariid from the lower Carboniferous of Indiana

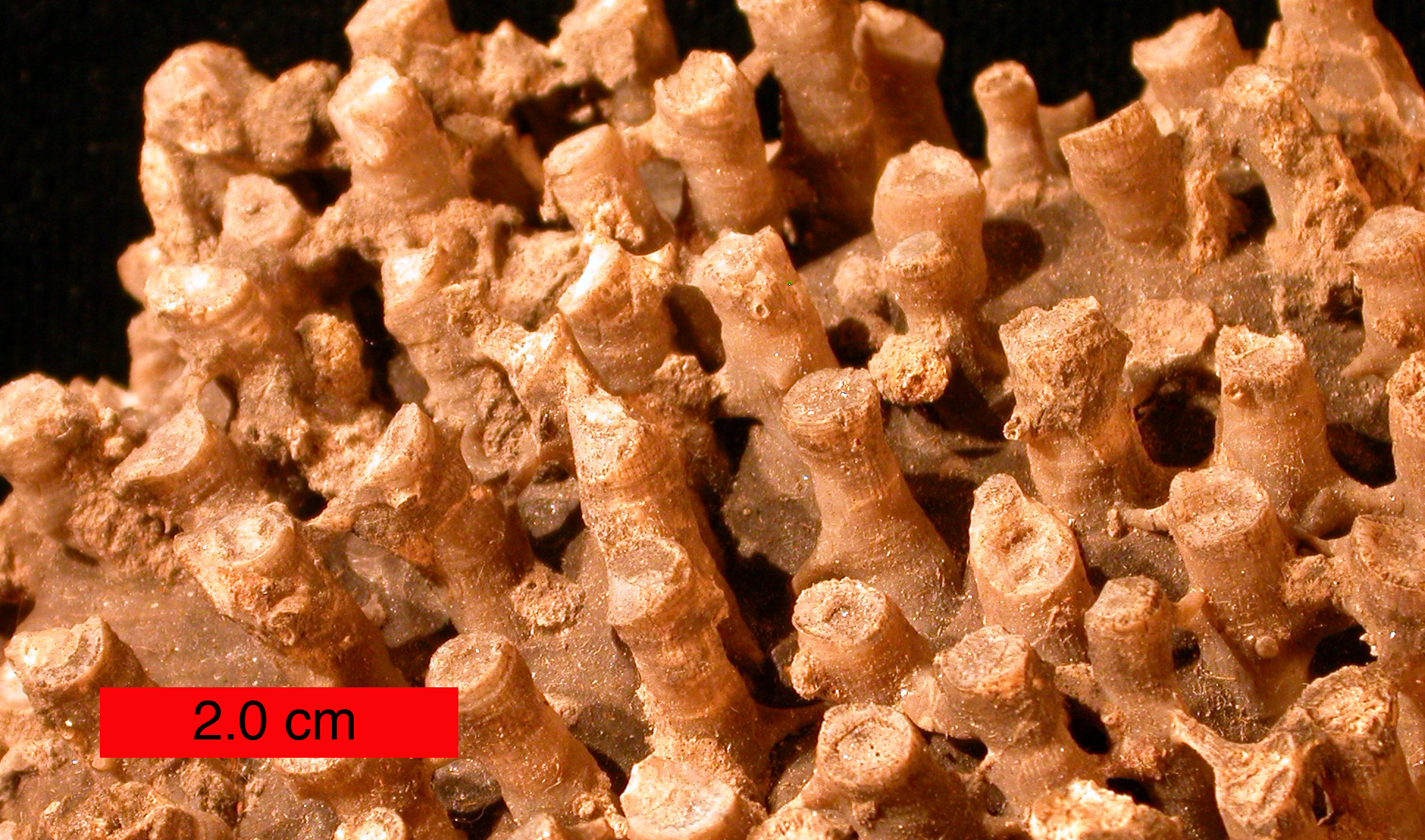
Tabulate coral (a syringoporid); Boone Limestone (lower Carboniferous) near Hiwasse, Arkansas

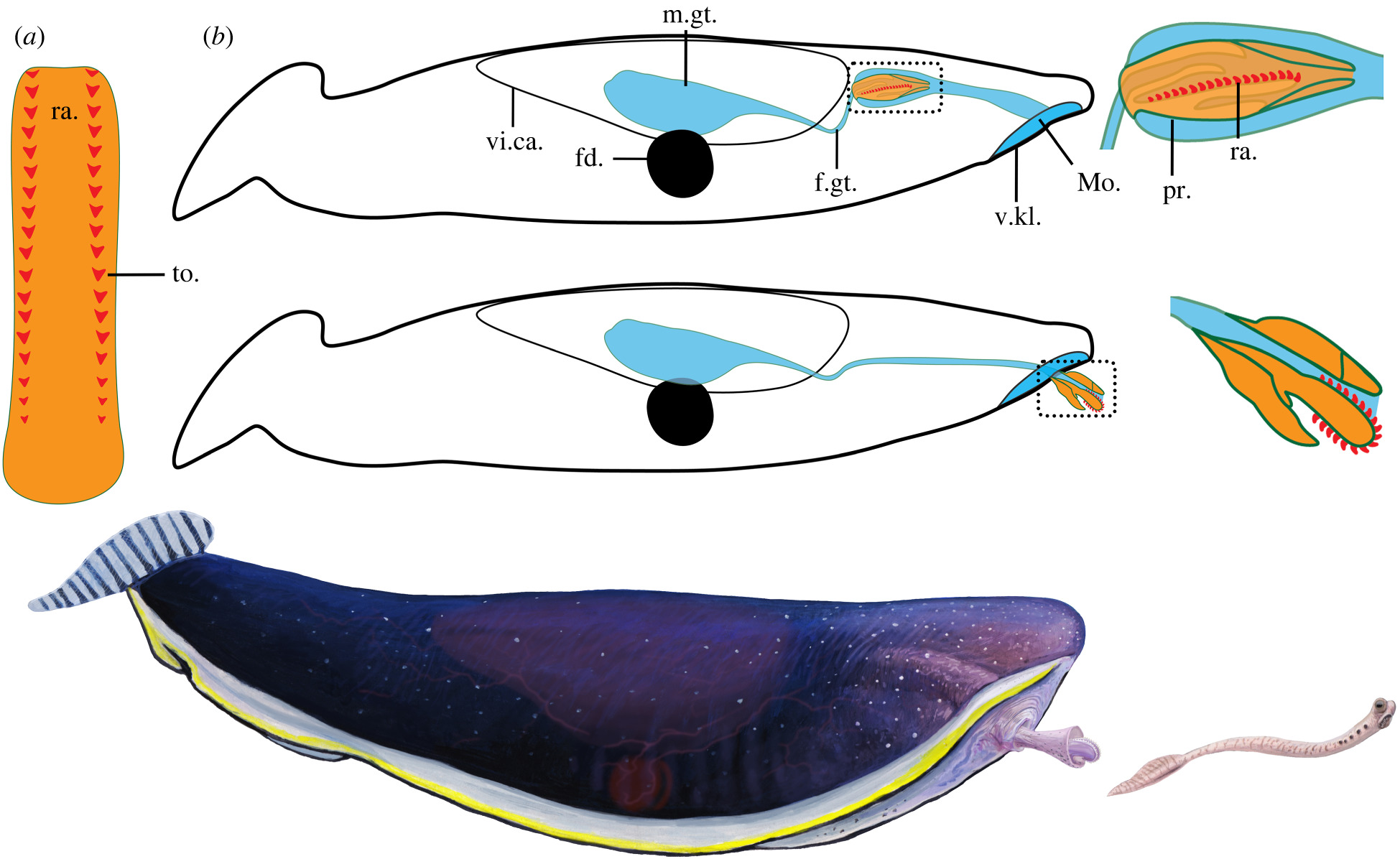
Typhloesus was a bizarre invertebrate that lived in Montana. It is possibly a mollusk related to gastropods.

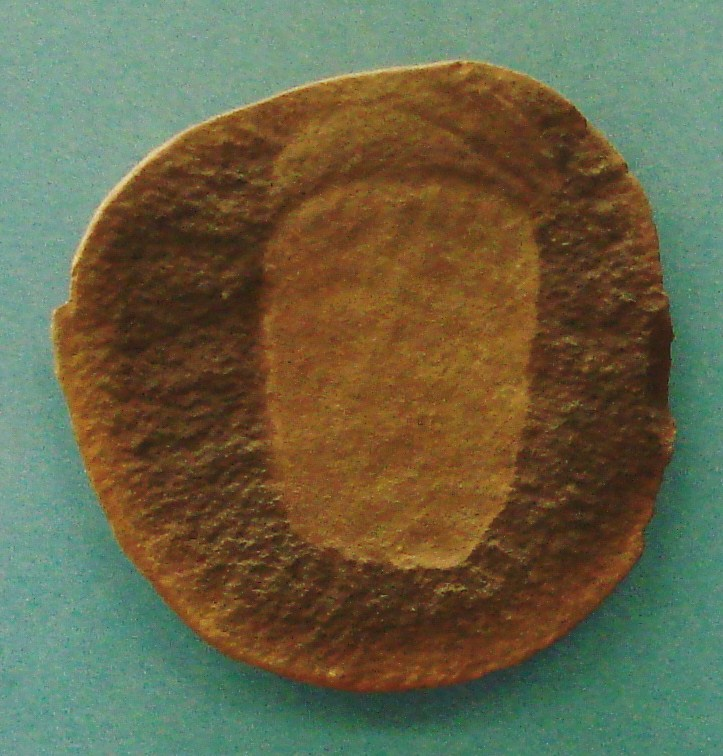
Essexella was a cnidarian that lived in Northern Illinois. It was long considered a scyphozoan, but is now regarded as a Sea anemone

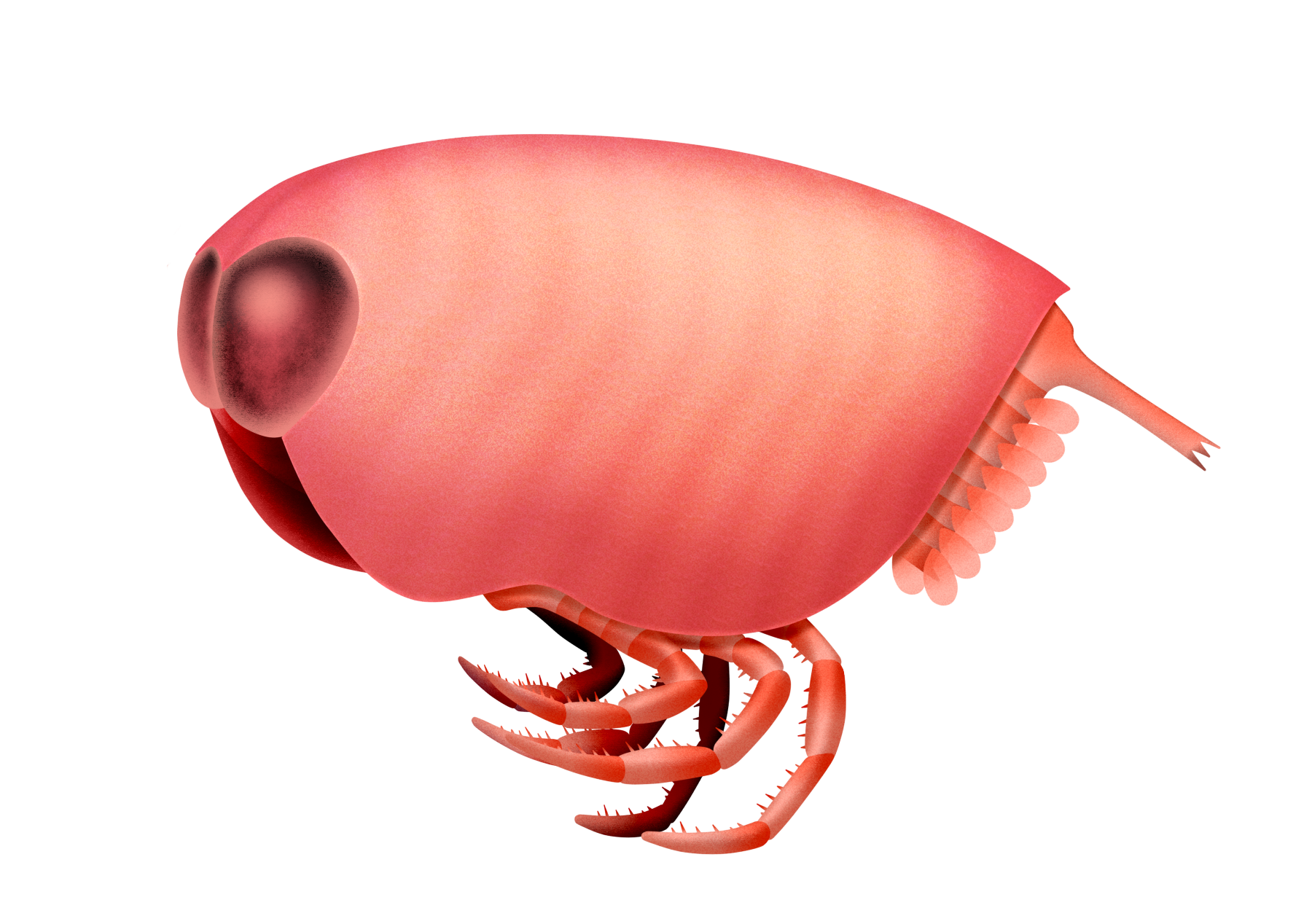
Concavicaris was a long lasting genus of thylacocephalan arthropod that lived from the Devonian to the Carboniferous.

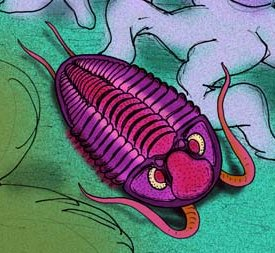
Triproetus was a genus of proetid trilobite, which were the only order that survived the end-Devonian extinction

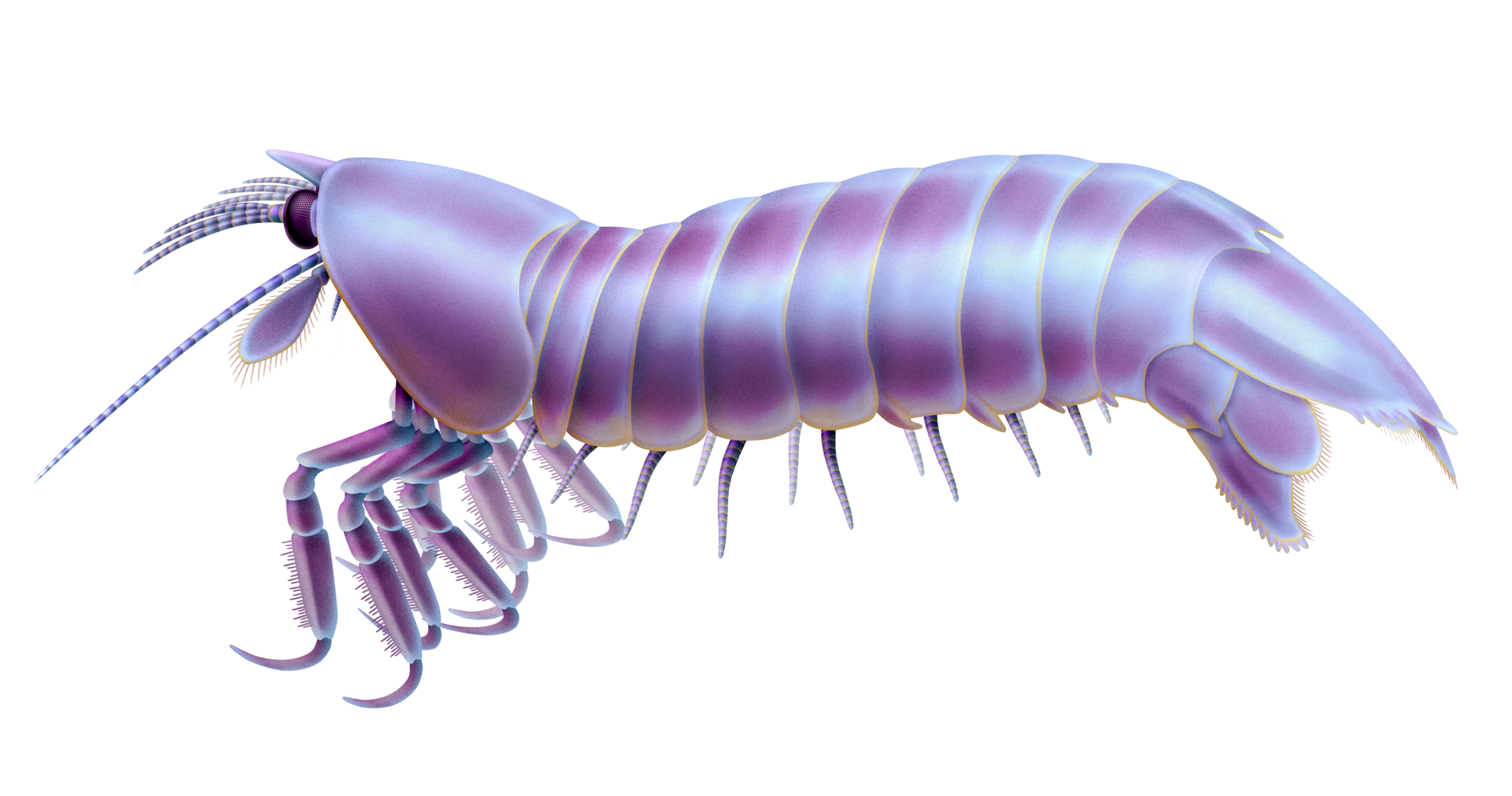
Daidal was a basal species of Mantis shrimp (stomatopoda)

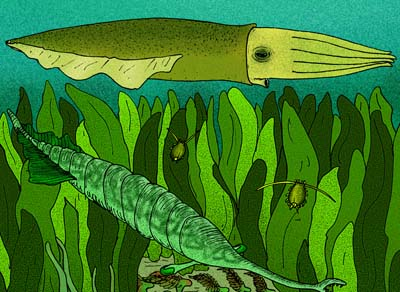
Jeletzkya was an early genus of coleoid cephalopod from northern Illinois

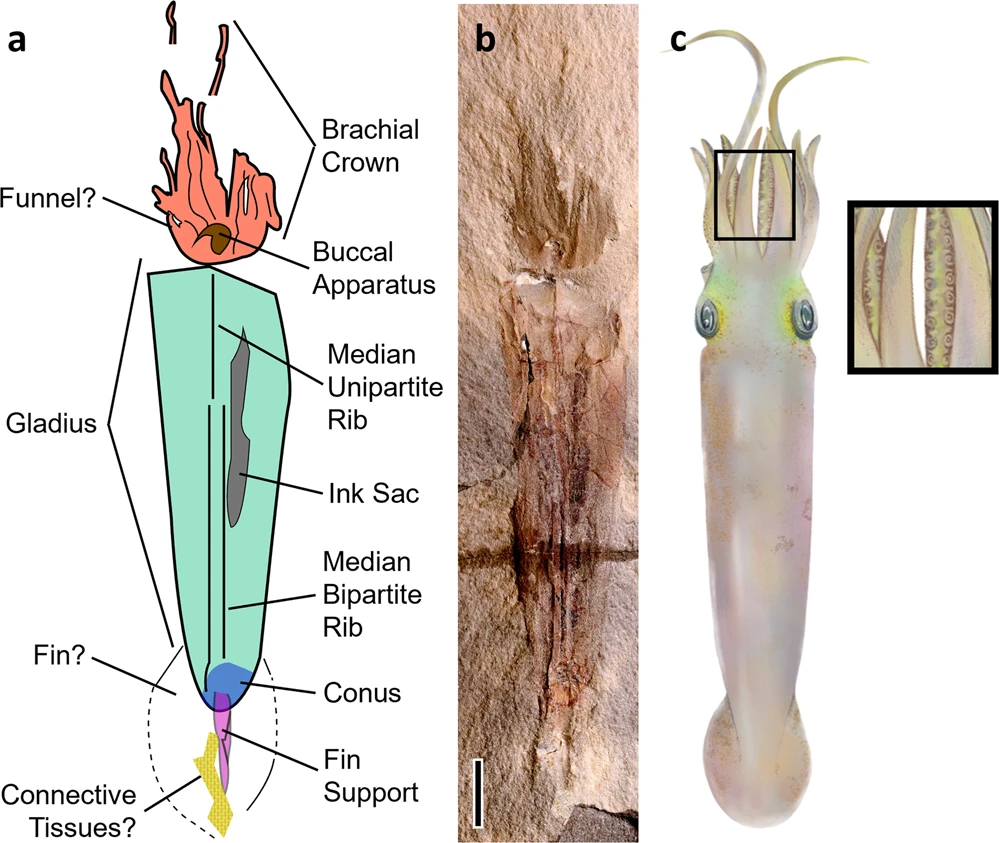
Syllipsimopodi was the earliest known vampyropod cephalopod, originating from Carboniferous rocks of Montana.

=== Freshwater and lagoonal invertebrates ===
Freshwater Carboniferous invertebrates include various bivalve molluscs that lived in brackish or fresh water, such as Anthraconaia, Naiadites, and Carbonicola; diverse crustaceans such as Candona, Carbonita, Darwinula, Estheria, Acanthocaris, Dithyrocaris, and Anthrapalaemon. The eurypterids were also diverse, and are represented by such genera as Adelophthalmus, Megarachne (originally misinterpreted as a giant spider, hence its name) and the specialised very large Hibbertopterus. Many of these were amphibious. Frequently a temporary return of marine conditions resulted in marine or brackish water genera such as Lingula, Orbiculoidea, and Productus being found in the thin beds known as marine bands.

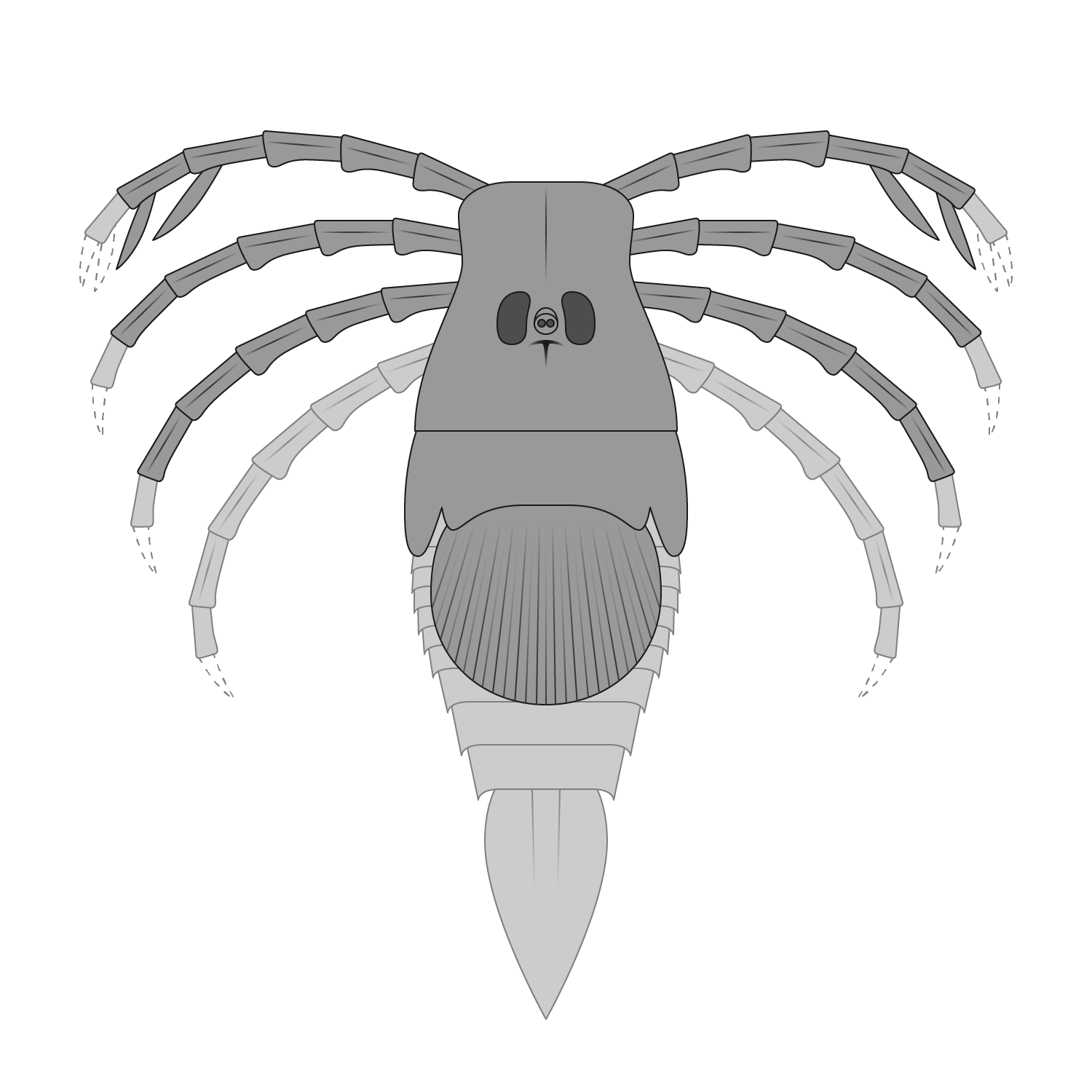
Megarachne was a large freshwater eurypterid from South America that was originally misidentified as a spider

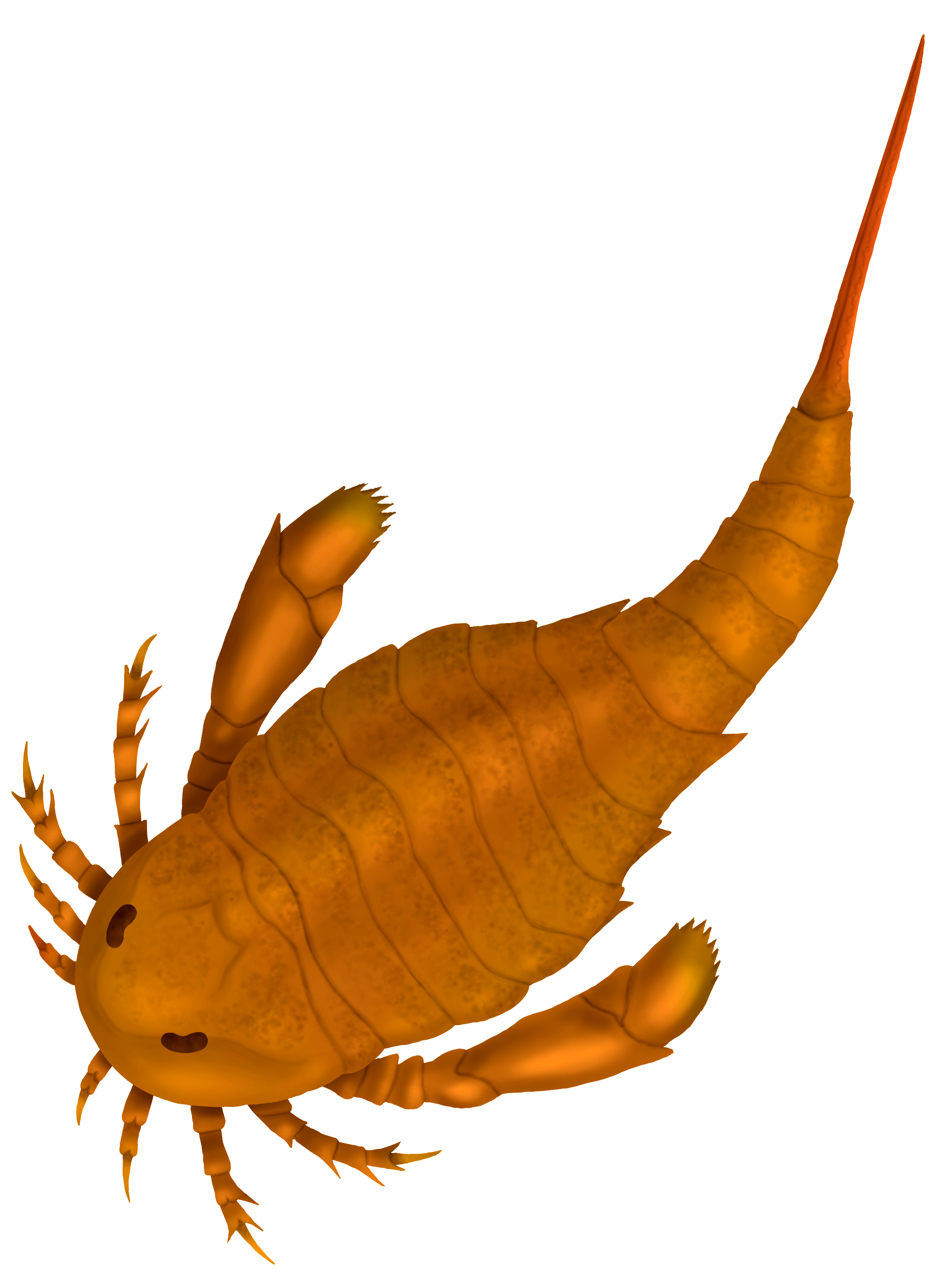
Adelophthalmus was the only genus of eurypterine eurypterid that survived past the Devonian

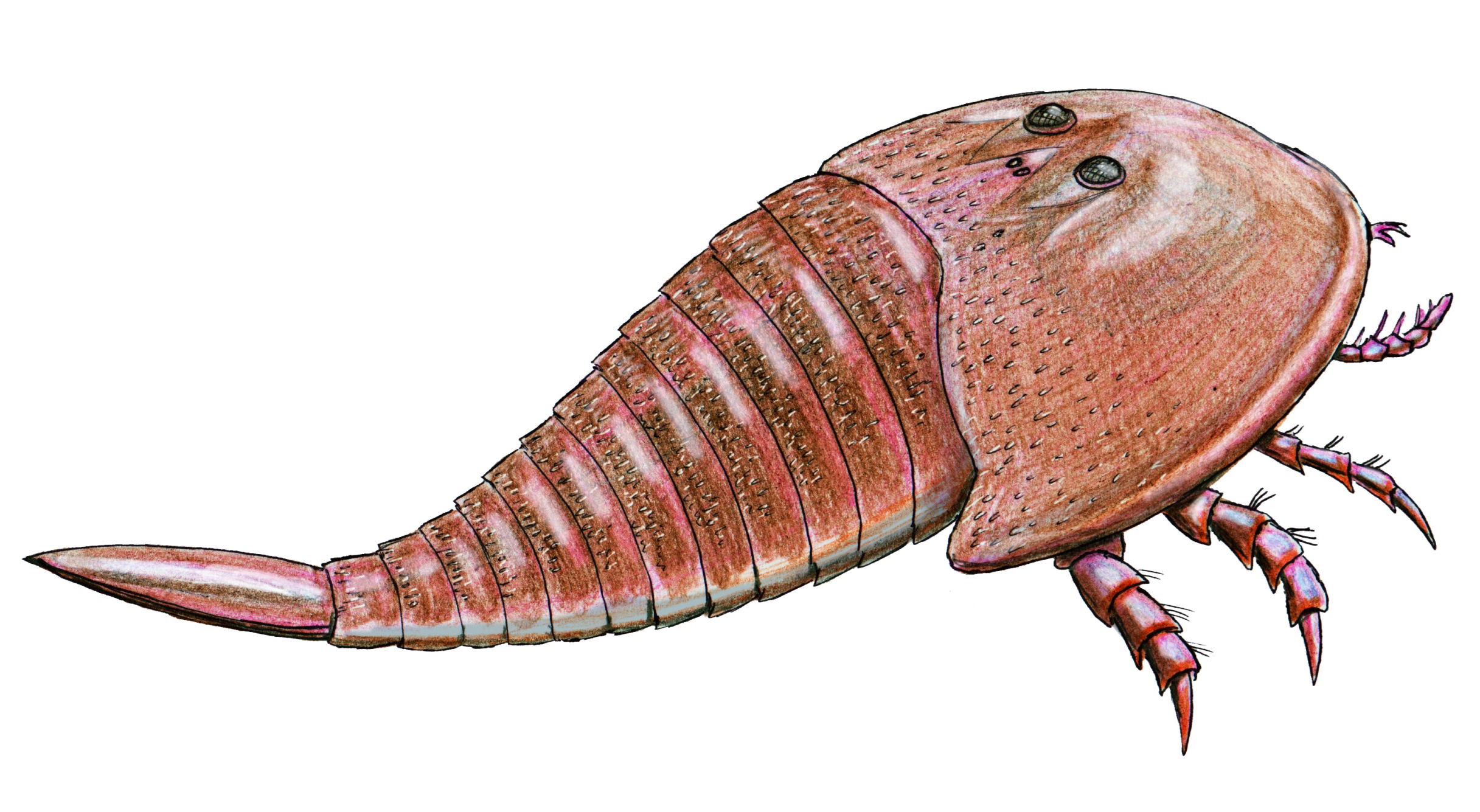
Due to its large and compact shell, Hibbertopterus was one of if not the heaviest eurypterid in the fossil record

=== Terrestrial invertebrates ===
Fossil remains of air-breathing insects, myriapods, and arachnids are known from the Carboniferous. Their diversity when they do appear, however, shows that these arthropods were both well-developed and numerous. Some arthropods grew to large sizes with the up to 2.6-meter-long (8.5 ft) millipede-like Arthropleura being the largest-known land invertebrate of all time. In the mid-Mississippian the oldest known winged insects appears, followed by the huge predatory Protodonata (griffinflies), which includes Meganeura, a giant dragonfly-like insect and with a wingspan of ca. 75 cm (30 in)—the largest flying insect ever to roam the planet. Further groups are the Syntonopterodea (relatives of present-day mayflies), the abundant and often large sap-sucking Palaeodictyopteroidea, the diverse herbivorous Protorthoptera, and numerous basal Dictyoptera (ancestors of cockroaches).

Many insects have been obtained from the coalfields of Saarbrücken and Commentry, and from the hollow trunks of fossil trees in Nova Scotia. Some British coalfields have yielded good specimens: Archaeoptilus, from the Derbyshire coalfield, had a large wing with 4.3 cm (2 in) preserved part, and some specimens (Brodia) still exhibit traces of brilliant wing colors. In the Nova Scotian tree trunks land snails (Archaeozonites, Dendropupa) have been found.

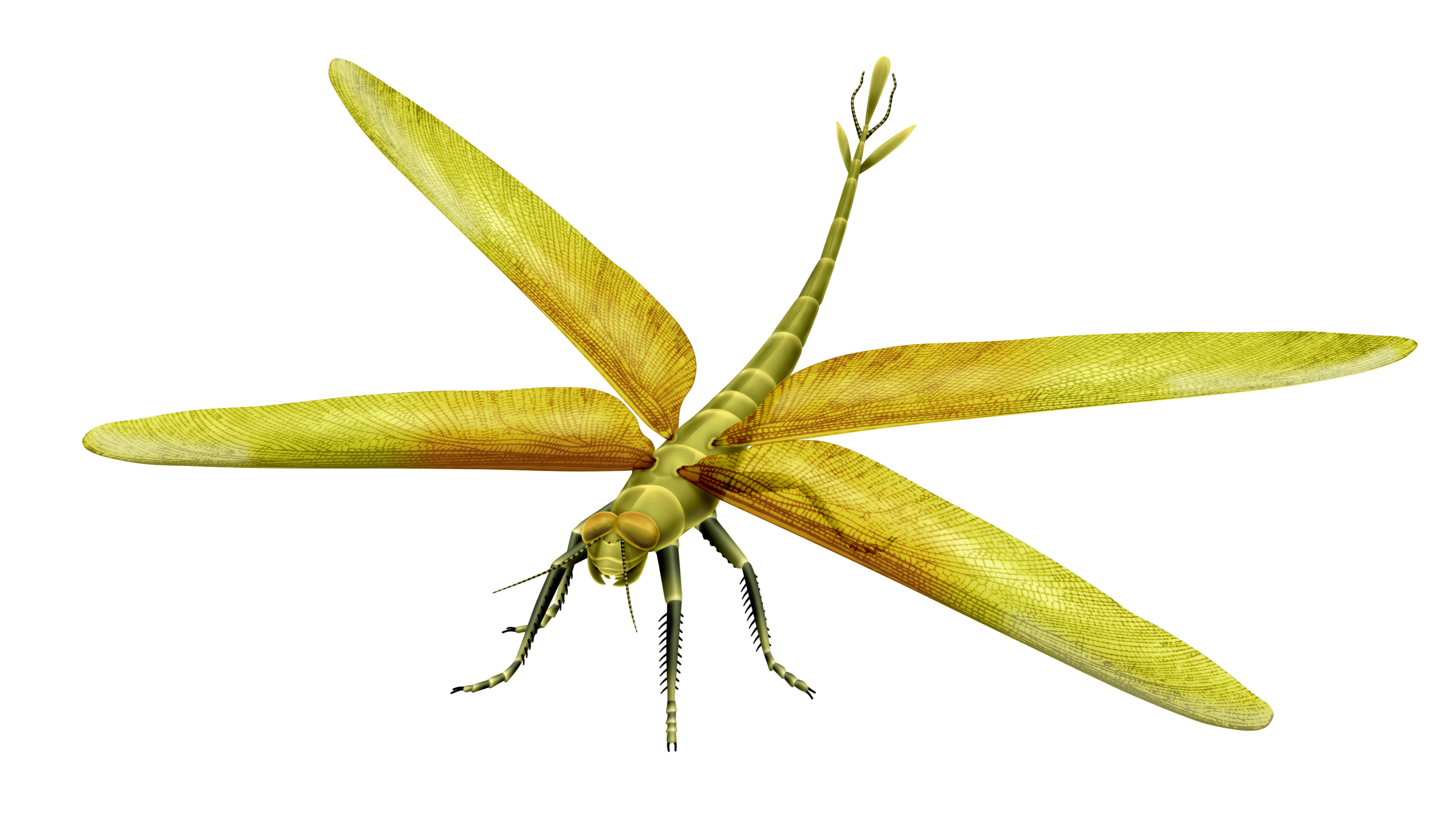
The late Carboniferous giant dragonfly-like insect Meganeura grew to wingspans over 60 cm (2 ft 0 in).

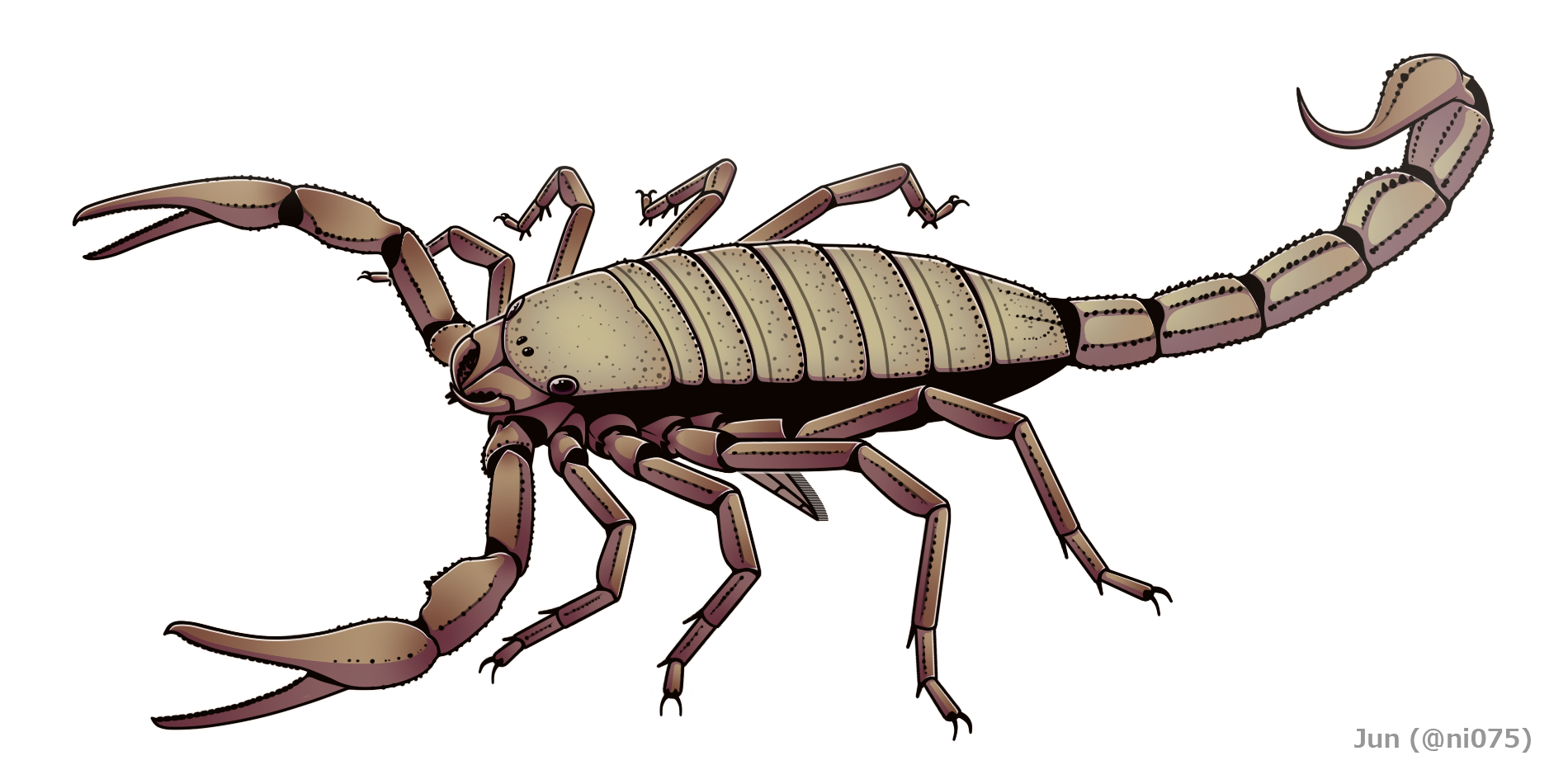
The gigantic Pulmonoscorpius from the early Carboniferous reached a length of up to 70 cm (2 ft 4 in).

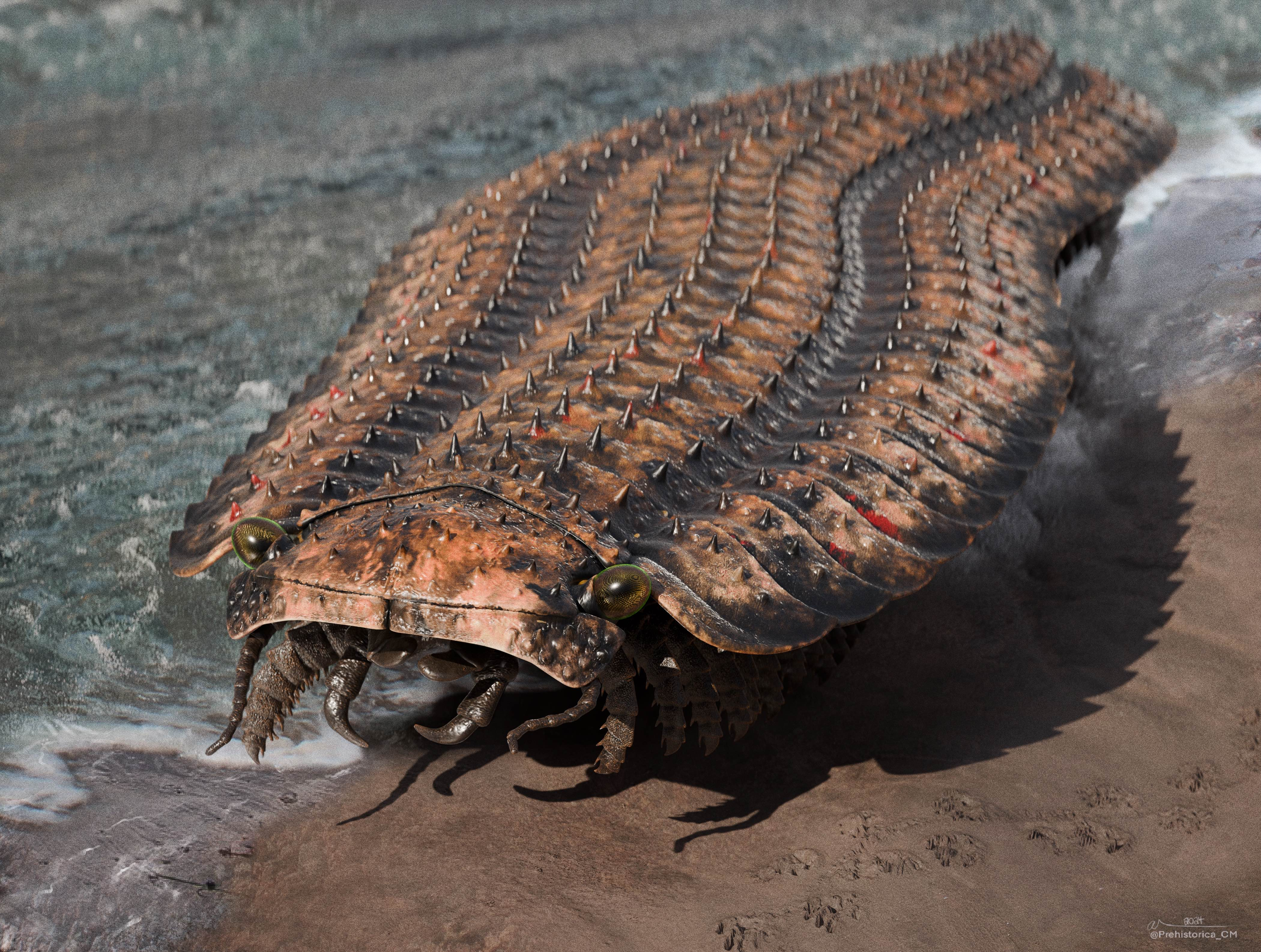
Arthropleura was a giant millipede that fed on the Carboniferous plants. At 8 ft (240 cm) long, it was the largest known terrestrial arthropod that ever lived.

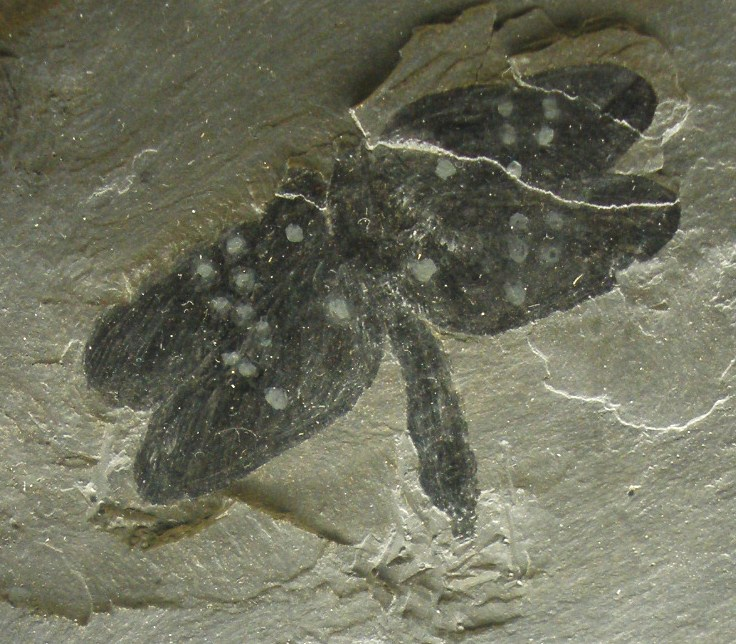
Homaloneura, a palaeodictyopteran insect which have two winglets on thorax in addition to four wings.

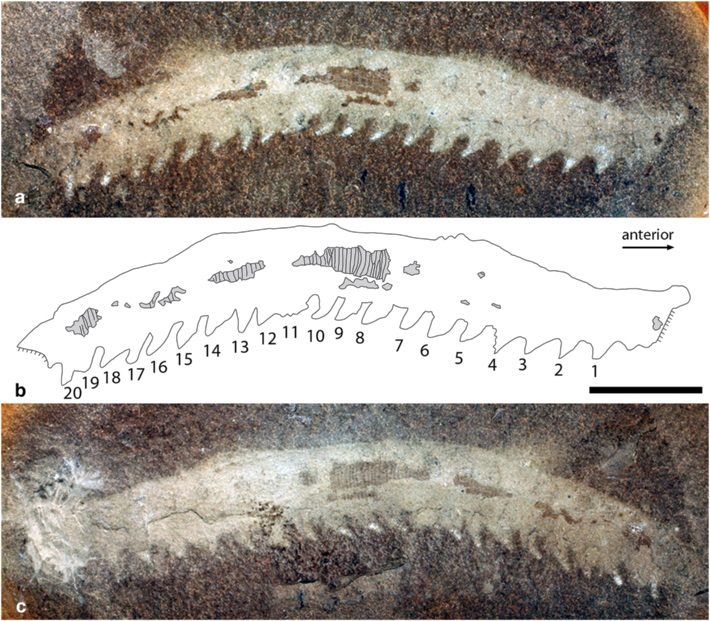
Helenodora inopinata, a stem-group onychophoran known from Illinois

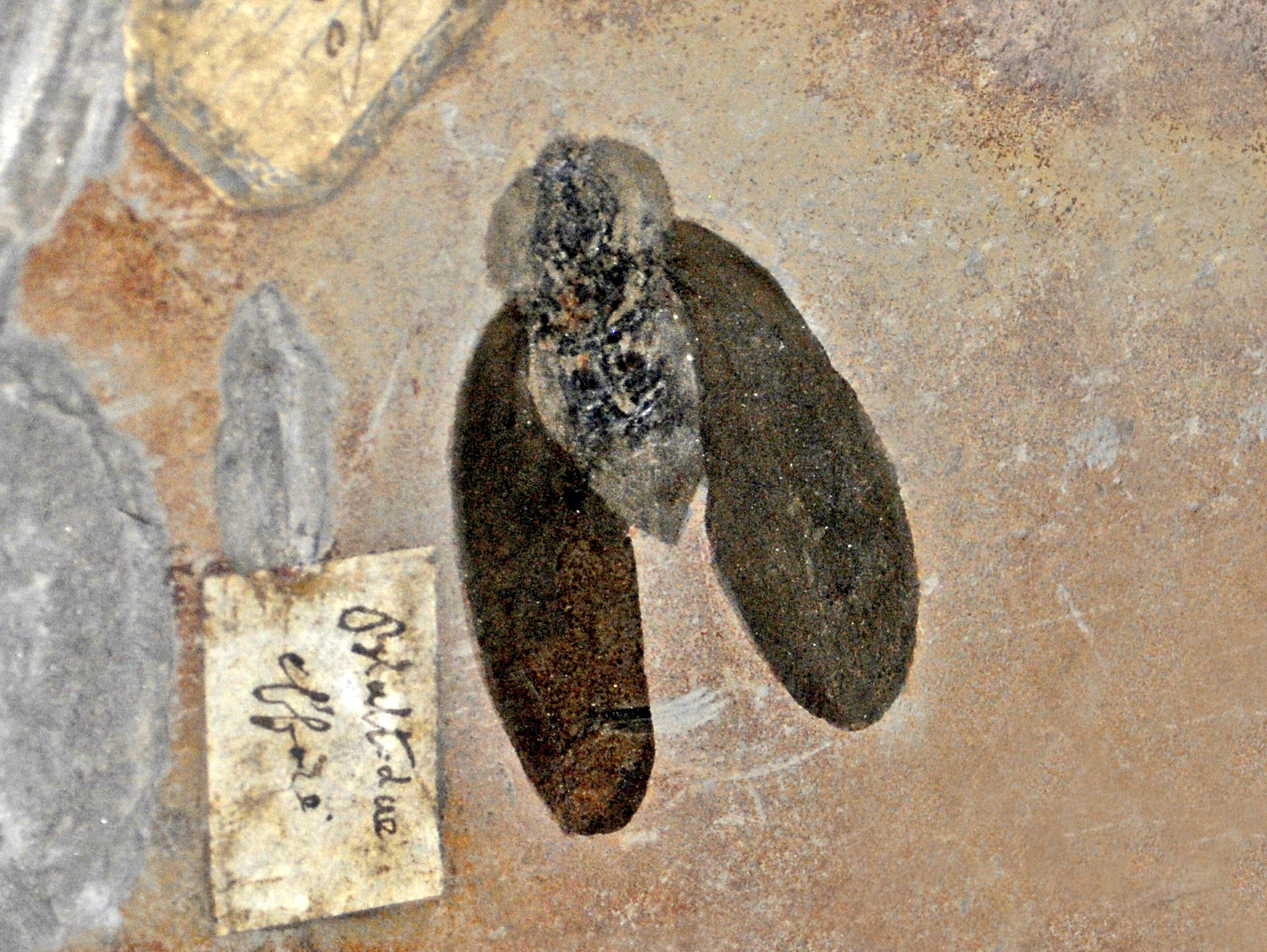
A roachoid insect found in Carboniferous rocks of France

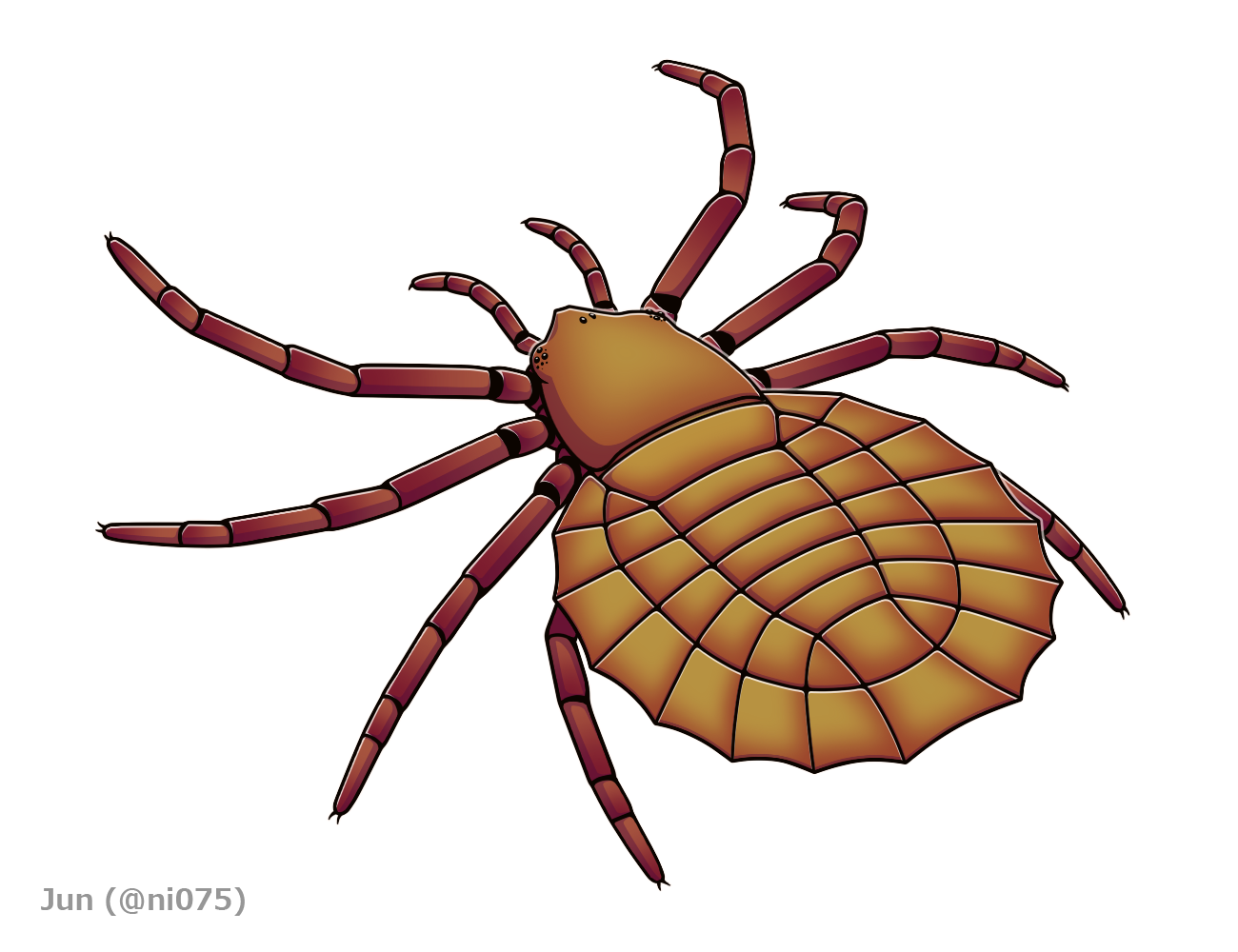
Maiocercus was a trigonotarbid arachnid that lived in the United Kingdom around 310 million years ago.

=== Fish ===
Many fish inhabited the Carboniferous seas; predominantly Elasmobranchs (sharks and their relatives). These included some, like Psammodus, with crushing pavement-like teeth adapted for grinding the shells of brachiopods, crustaceans, and other marine organisms. Other groups of elasmobranchs, like the ctenacanthiformes grew to large sizes, with some genera like Saivodus reaching around 6–9 meters (20–30 ft). Other fish had piercing teeth, such as the Symmoriida; some, the petalodonts, had peculiar cycloid cutting teeth. Most of the other cartilaginous fish were marine, but others like the Xenacanthida, and several genera like Bandringa invaded fresh waters of the coal swamps. Among the bony fish, the Palaeonisciformes found in coastal waters also appear to have migrated to rivers. Sarcopterygian fish were also prominent, and one group, the Rhizodonts, reached very large size.

Most species of Carboniferous marine fish have been described largely from teeth, fin spines and dermal ossicles, with smaller freshwater fish preserved whole. Freshwater fish were abundant, and include the genera Ctenodus, Uronemus, Acanthodes, Cheirodus, and Gyracanthus. Chondrichthyes (especially holocephalans like the Stethacanthids) underwent a major evolutionary radiation during the Carboniferous. It is believed that this evolutionary radiation occurred because the decline of the placoderms at the end of the Devonian caused many environmental niches to become unoccupied and allowed new organisms to evolve and fill these niches. As a result of the evolutionary radiation Carboniferous holocephalans assumed a wide variety of bizarre shapes including Stethacanthus which possessed a flat brush-like dorsal fin with a patch of denticles on its top. Stethacanthus's unusual fin may have been used in mating rituals.

Other groups like the eugeneodonts filled in the niches left by large predatory placoderms. These fish were unique as they only possessed one, at most two, rows of teeth in either their upper or lower jaws in the form of elaborate tooth whorls. The first members of the helicoprionidae, a family eugeneodonts that were characterized by the presence of one circular tooth whorl in the lower jaw, appeared during the early Carboniferous. Perhaps the most bizarre radiation of holocephalans at this time was that of the iniopterygiformes, an order of holocephalans that greatly resembled modern day flying fish that could have also "flown" in the water with their massive, elongated pectoral fins. They were further characterized by their large eye sockets, club-like structures on their tails, and spines on the tips of their fins.

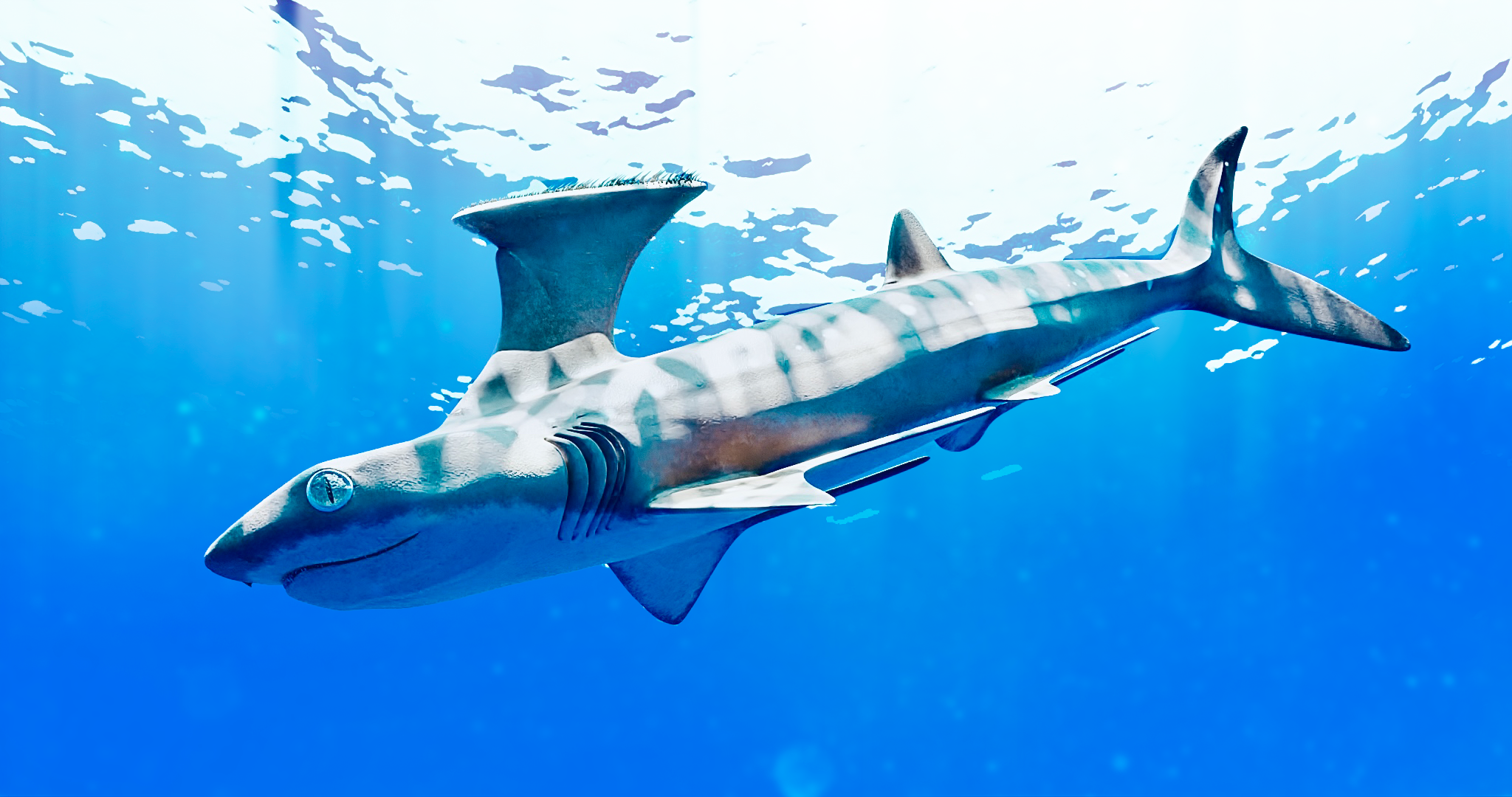
Akmonistion of the Holocephali order Symmoriida roamed the oceans of the early Carboniferous.

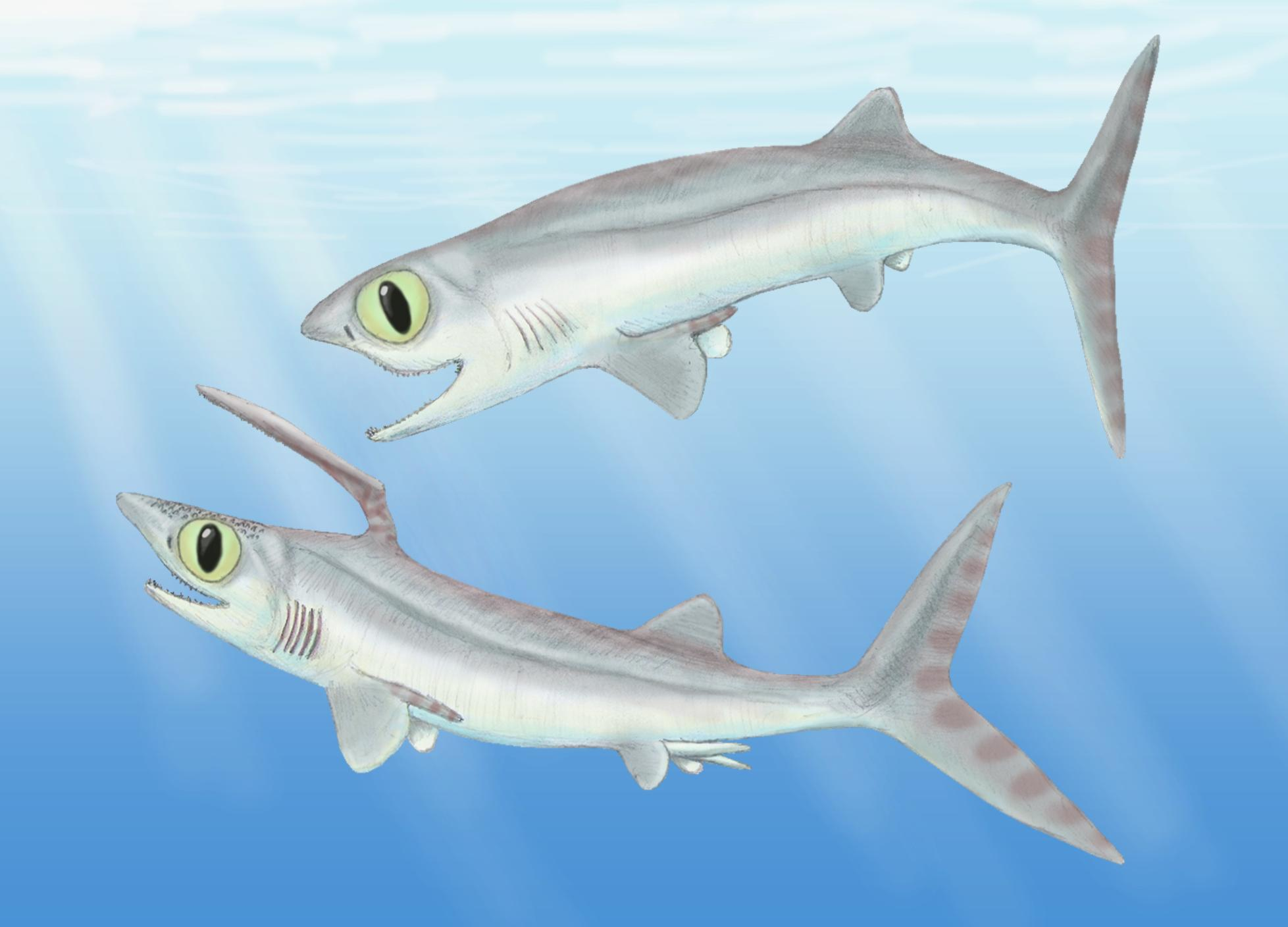
Falcatus was a Carboniferous holocephalan, with a high degree of sexual dimorphism.

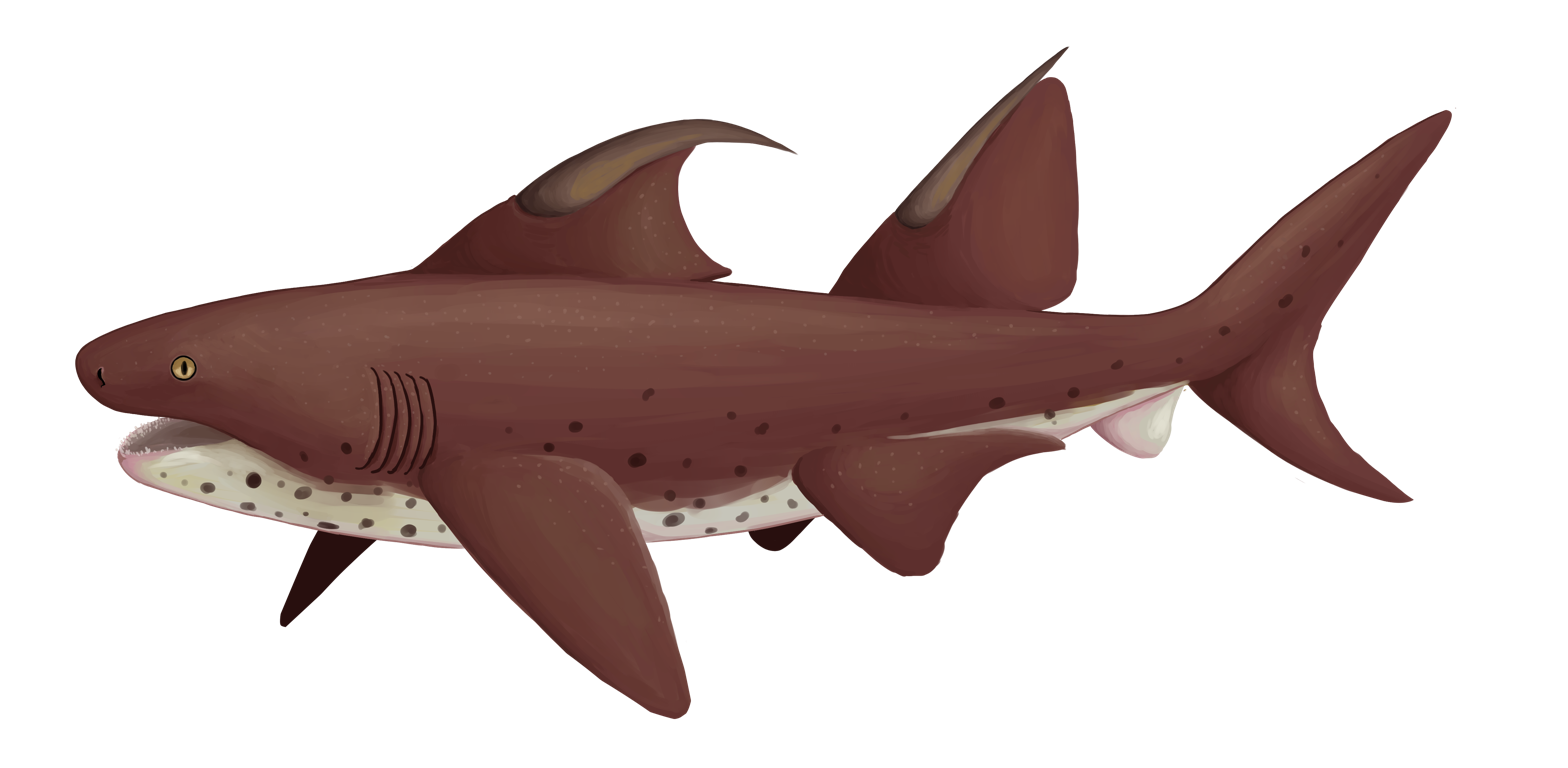
Dracopristis was a Ctenacanthiform elasmobranch from the late Carboniferous of New Mexico.

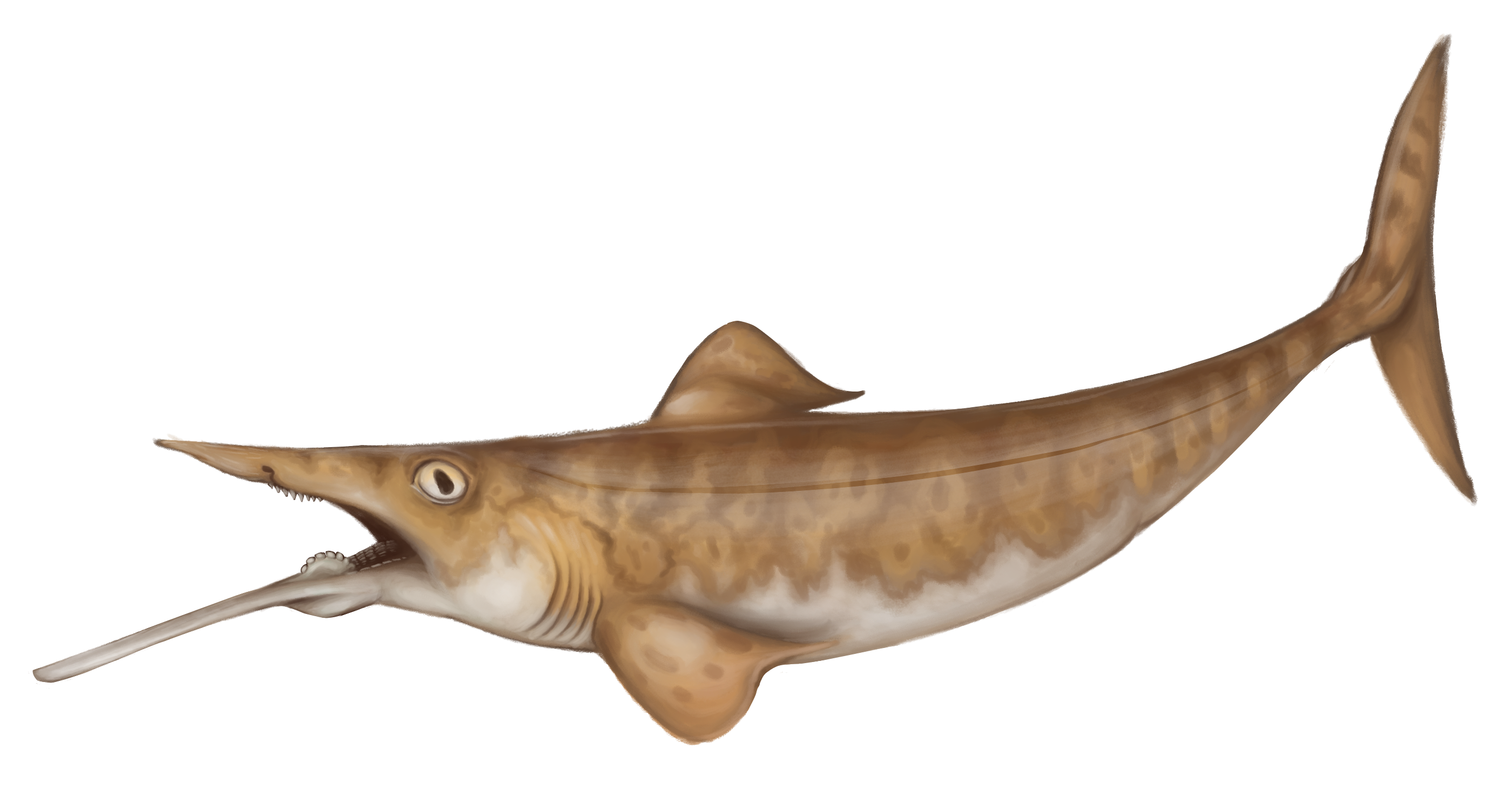
Ornithoprion was a small-sized Eugeneodont holocephalan that had an elongated lower jaw.

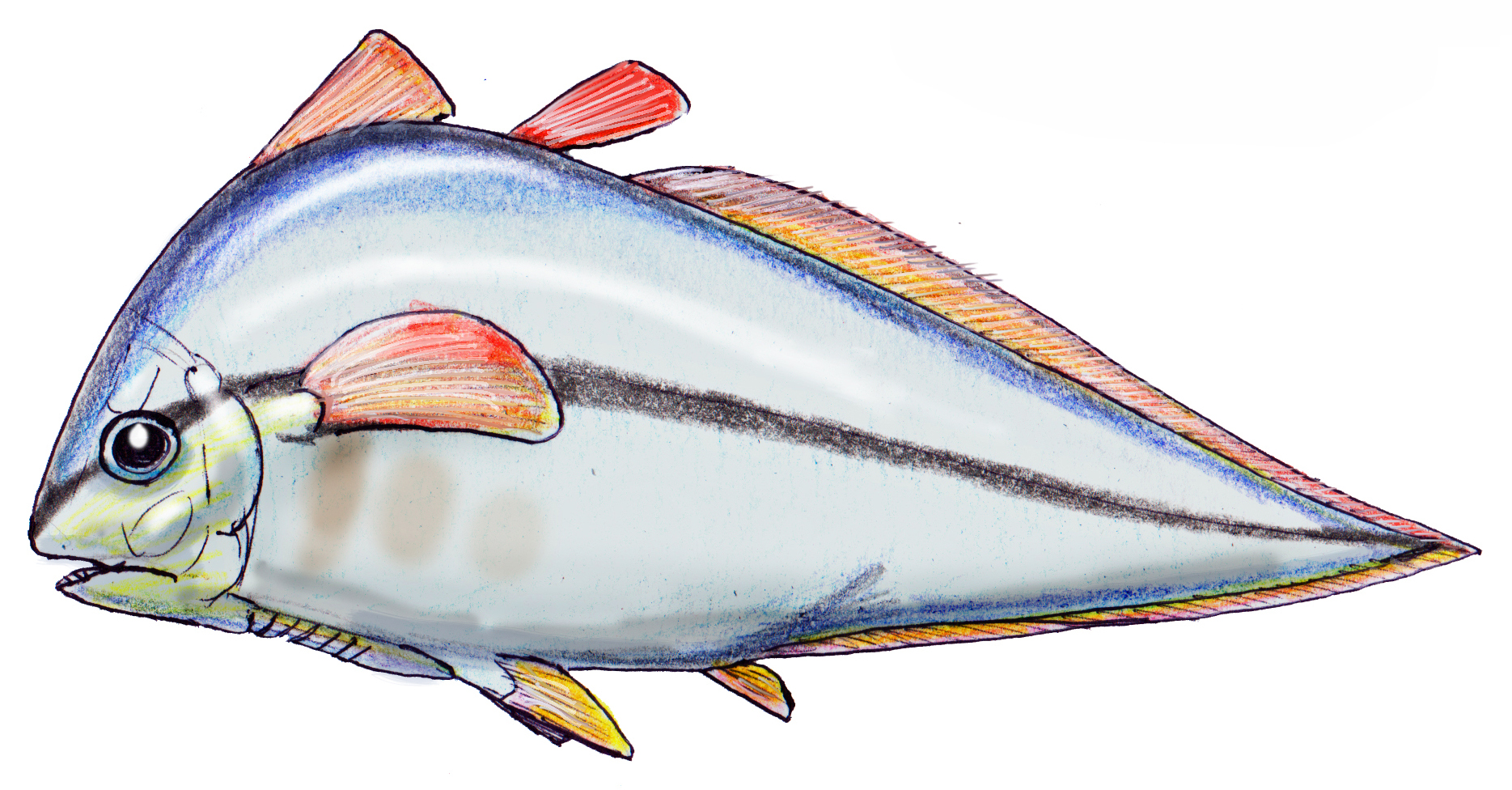
Allenypterus was a Coelacanth fish known from the Bear Gulch Limestone in Montana.

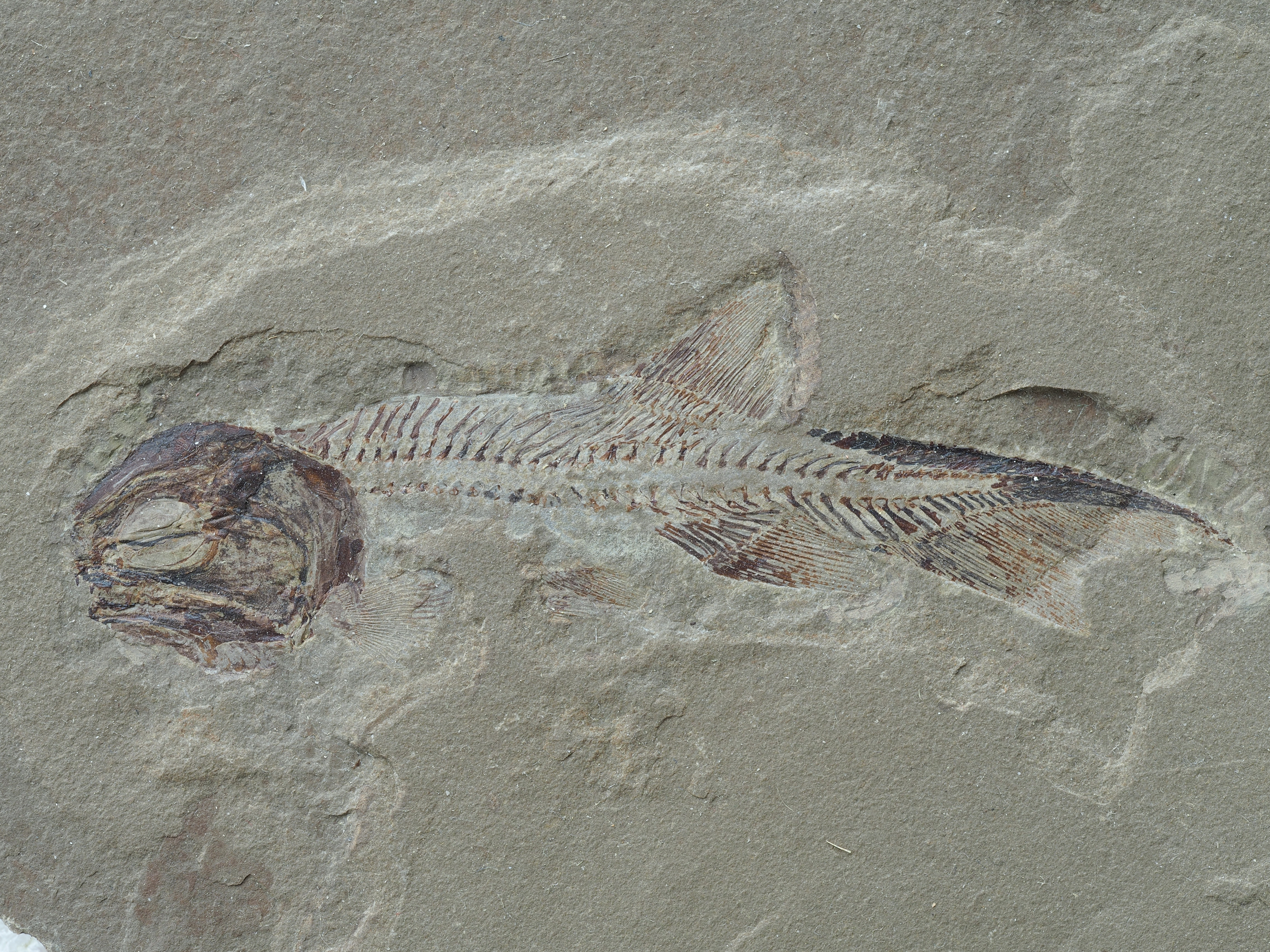
Phanerosteon was a Bony fish belonging to the extinct order Palaeonisciformes.

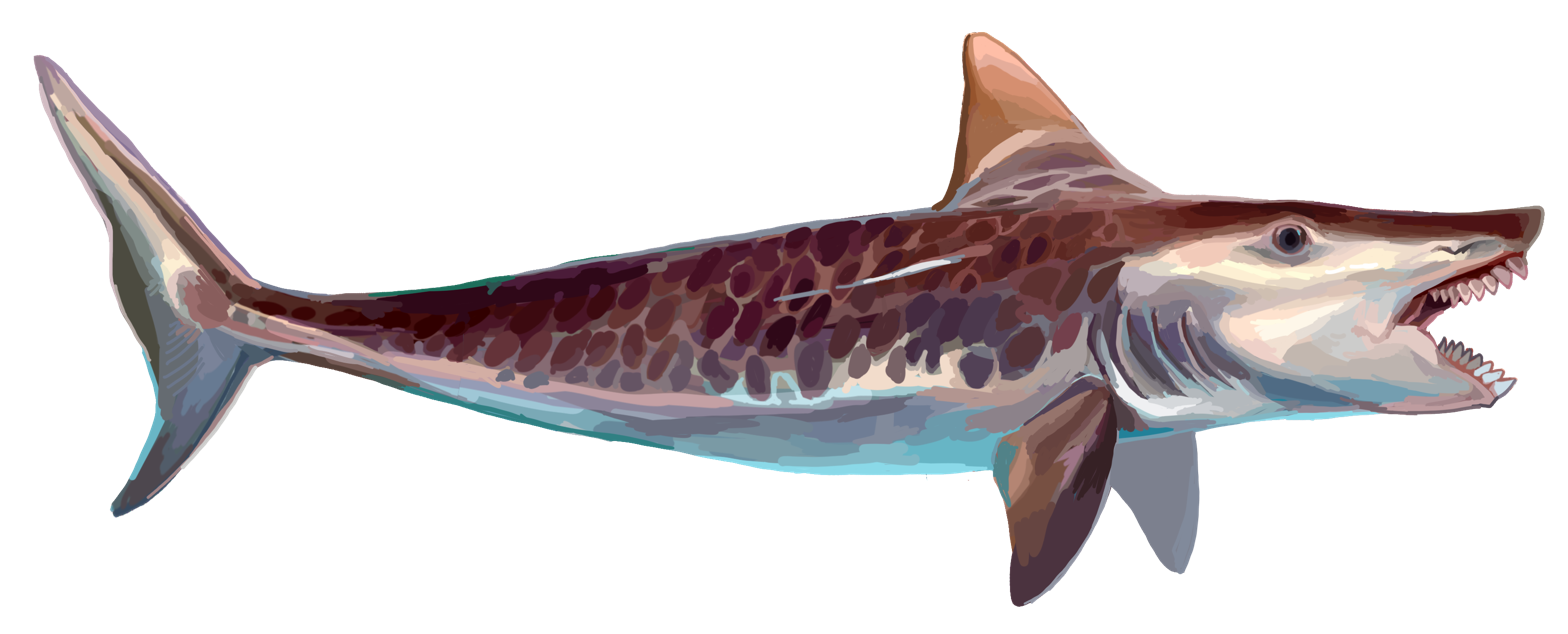
Edestus was a large eugeneodontid fish that possessed two tooth whorls in its mouth

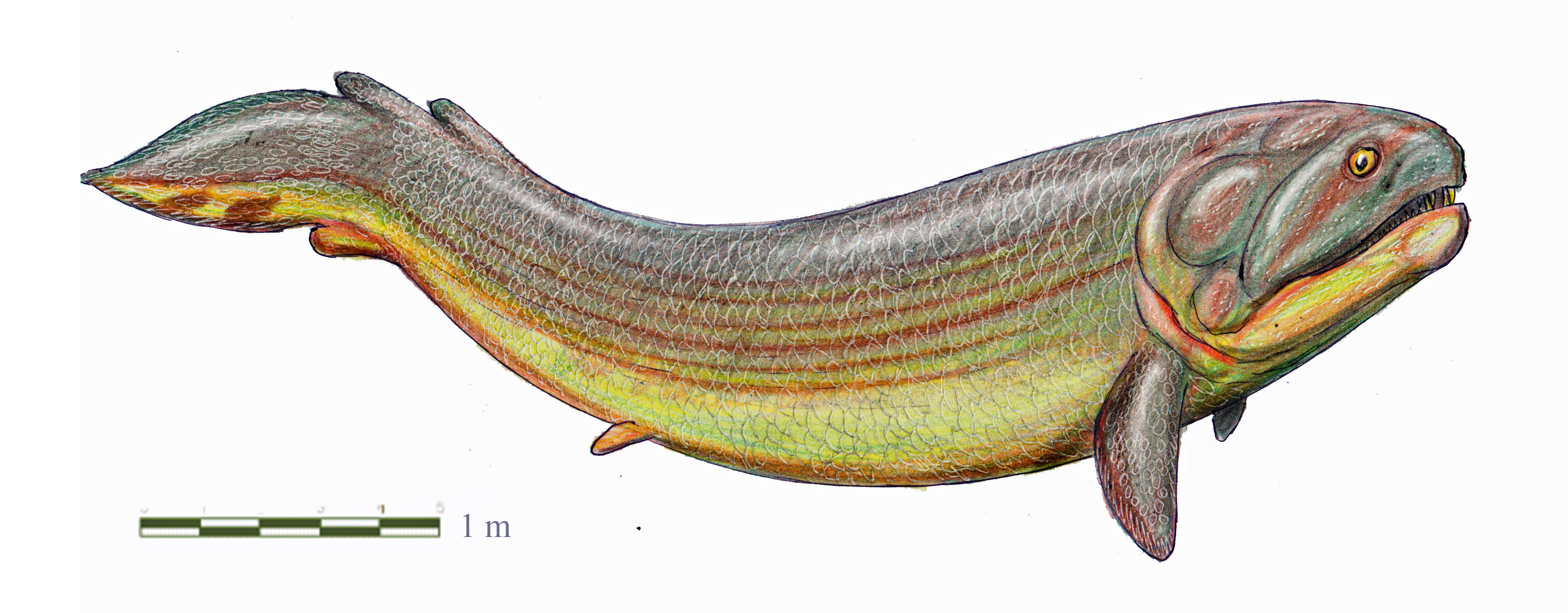
Rhizodus was a large freshwater Rhizodont sarcopterygian from Europe and North America.

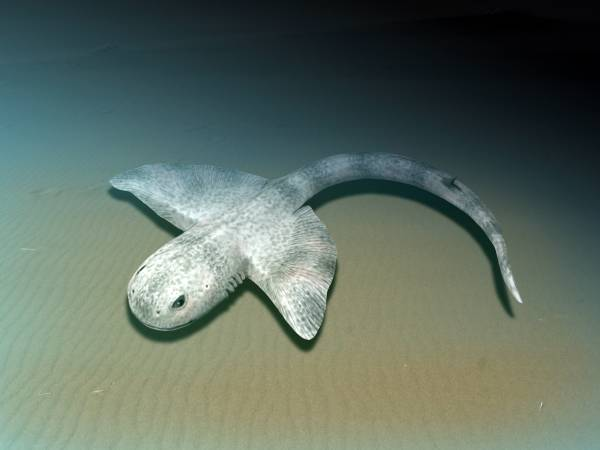
Squatinactis, a genus of elasmobranch fish from Montana that possessed enlarged pectoral fins similar to modern angel sharks

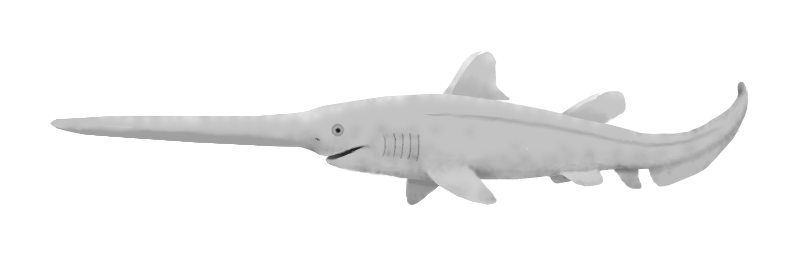
Bandringa is a bizarre elasmobranch fish that lived in Illinois, Ohio and Pennsylvania during the Moscovian stage. It superficially resembled a paddlefish, with an elongated upper rostrum.

Iniopteryx was a holocephalan that lived in North America. This fish belonged to a group called the Iniopterygiformes, that possibly lived like flying fish.

=== Tetrapods ===
Carboniferous amphibians were diverse and common by the middle of the period, more so than they are today; some were as long as 6 meters, and those fully terrestrial as adults had scaly skin. They included basal tetrapod groups classified in early books under the Labyrinthodontia. These had a long body, a head covered with bony plates, and generally weak or undeveloped limbs. The largest were over 2 meters long. They were accompanied by an assemblage of smaller amphibians included under the Lepospondyli, often only about 15 cm (6 in) long. Some Carboniferous amphibians were aquatic and lived in rivers (Loxomma, Eogyrinus, Proterogyrinus); others may have been semi-aquatic (Ophiderpeton, Amphibamus, Hyloplesion) or terrestrial (Dendrerpeton, Tuditanus, Anthracosaurus).

The Carboniferous rainforest collapse slowed the evolution of amphibians who could not survive as well in the cooler, drier conditions. Amniotes, however, prospered because of specific key adaptations. One of the greatest evolutionary innovations of the Carboniferous was the amniote egg, which allowed the laying of eggs in a dry environment, as well as keratinized scales and claws, allowing for the further exploitation of the land by certain tetrapods. These included the earliest sauropsid reptiles (Hylonomus), and the earliest known synapsid (Archaeothyris). Synapsids quickly became huge and diversified in the Permian, only for their dominance to stop during the Mesozoic. Sauropsids (reptiles, and also, later, birds) also diversified but remained small until the Mesozoic, during which they dominated the land, as well as the water and sky, only for their dominance to stop during the Cenozoic.

Reptiles underwent a major evolutionary radiation in response to the drier climate that preceded the rainforest collapse. By the end of the Carboniferous amniotes had already diversified into a number of groups, including several families of synapsid pelycosaurs, protorothyridids, captorhinids, saurians and araeoscelids.

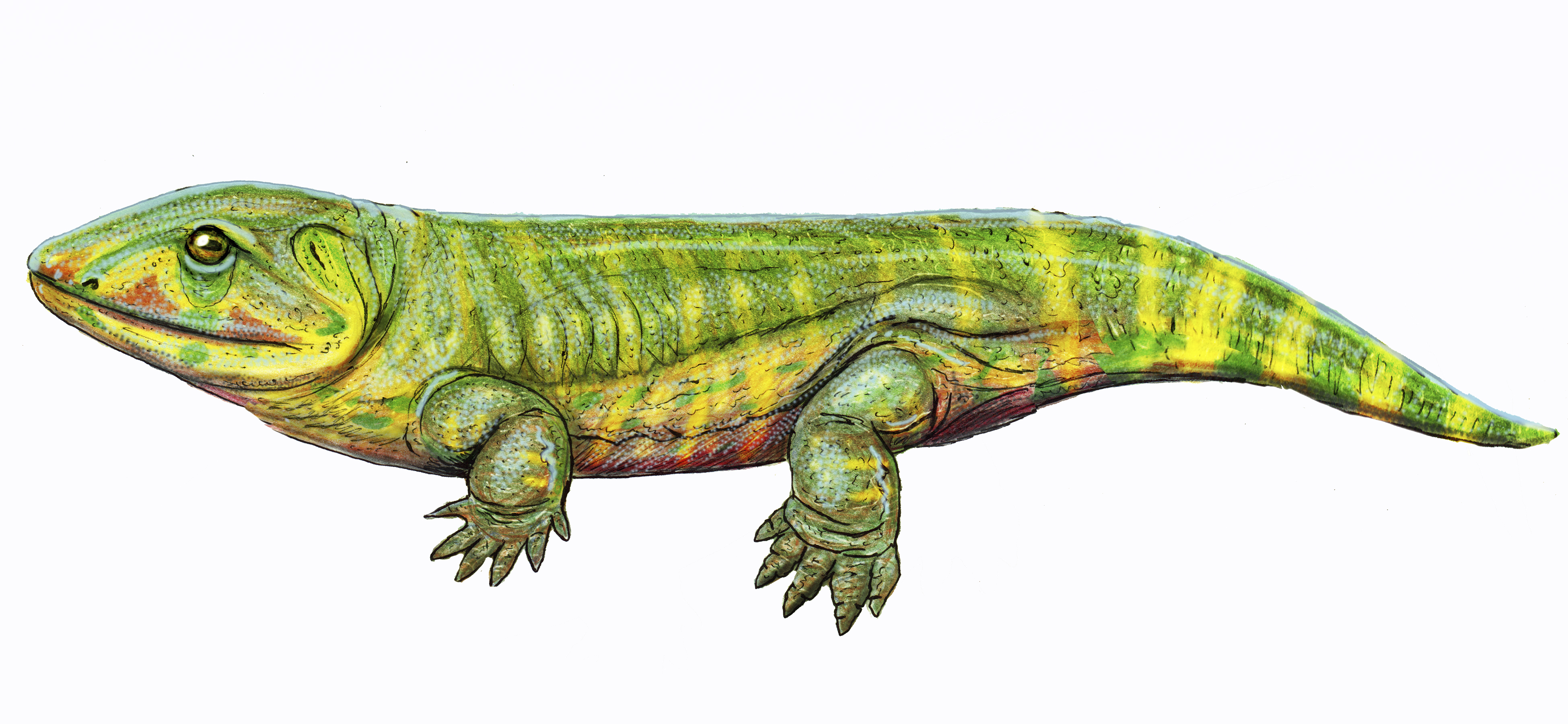
The amphibian-like Pederpes, the most primitive tetrapod found in the Mississippian, and known from Scotland.

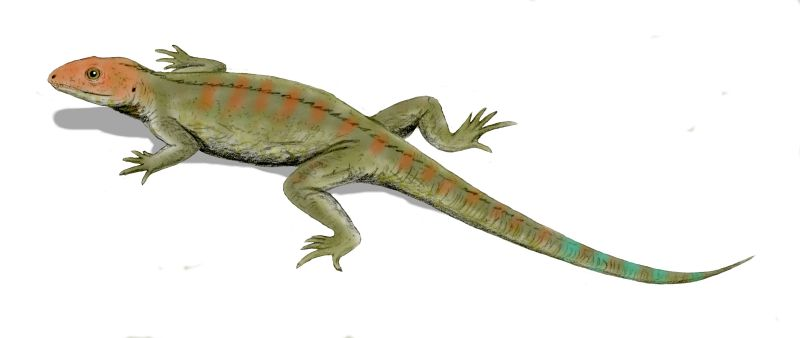
Hylonomus, the earliest sauropsid reptile, appeared in the Pennsylvanian, and is known from the Joggins Formation in Nova Scotia, and possibly New Brunswick.

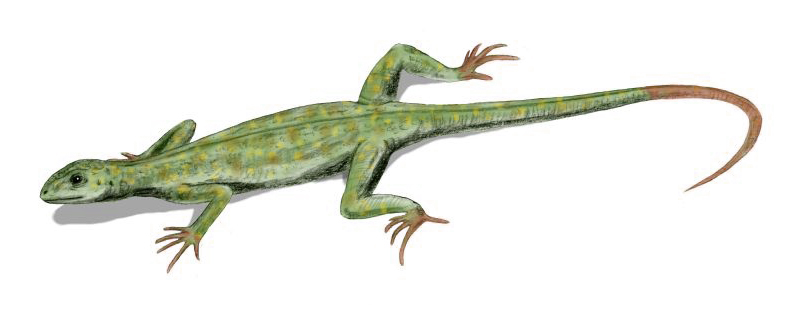
Petrolacosaurus, the earliest known diapsid reptile, lived during the late Carboniferous.

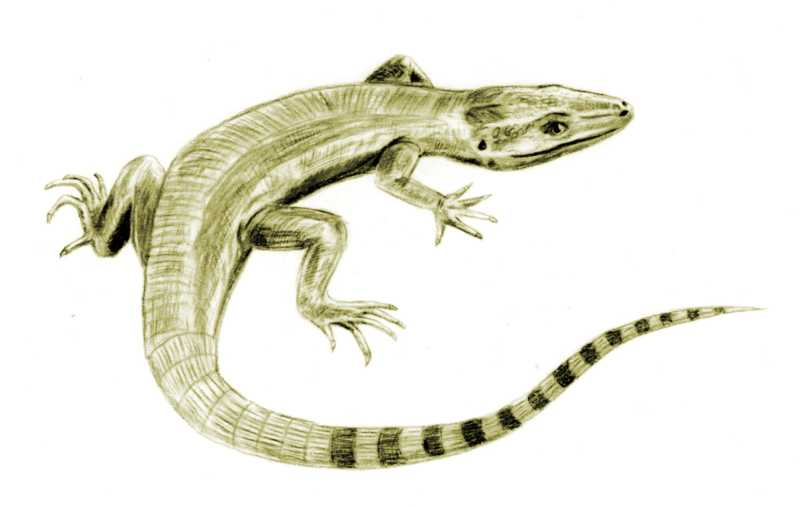
Archaeothyris is the oldest known synapsid, and is found in rocks from Nova Scotia.

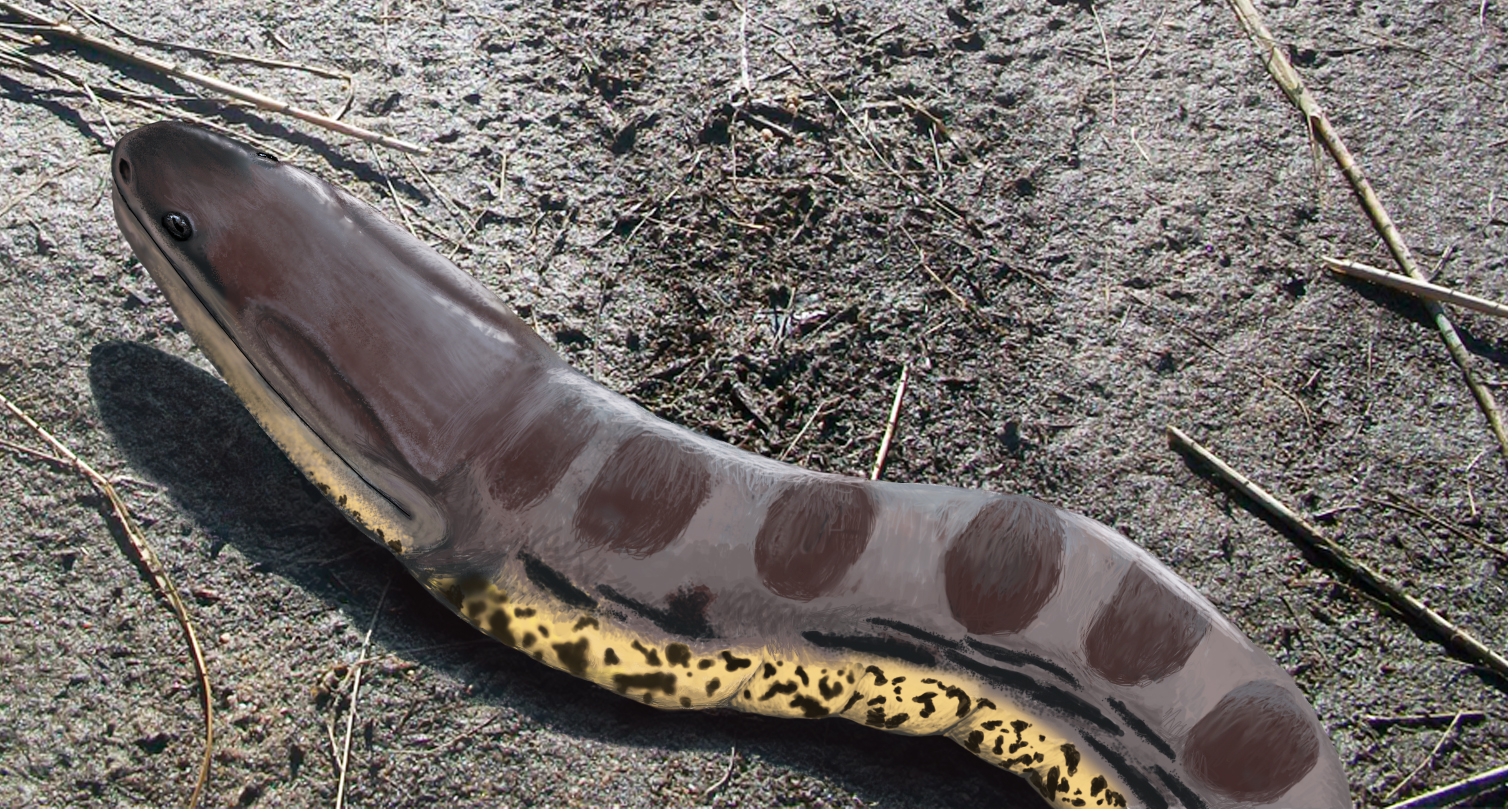
Coloraderpeton was a snake-like aïstopod tetrapodomorph from the late Carboniferous of Colorado.

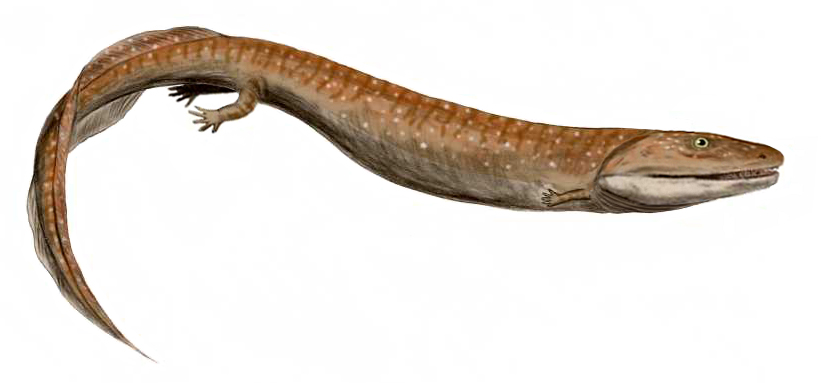
Crassigyrinus was a carnivorous stem-tetrapod from the early Carboniferous of Scotland.

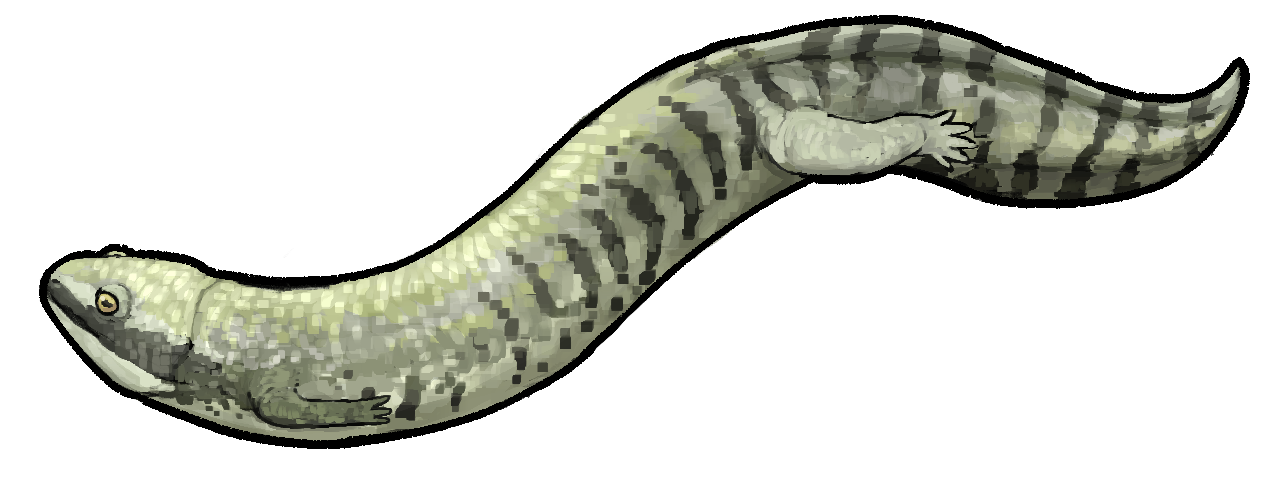
Microbrachis was a lepospondyl amphibian known from the Czech Republic.

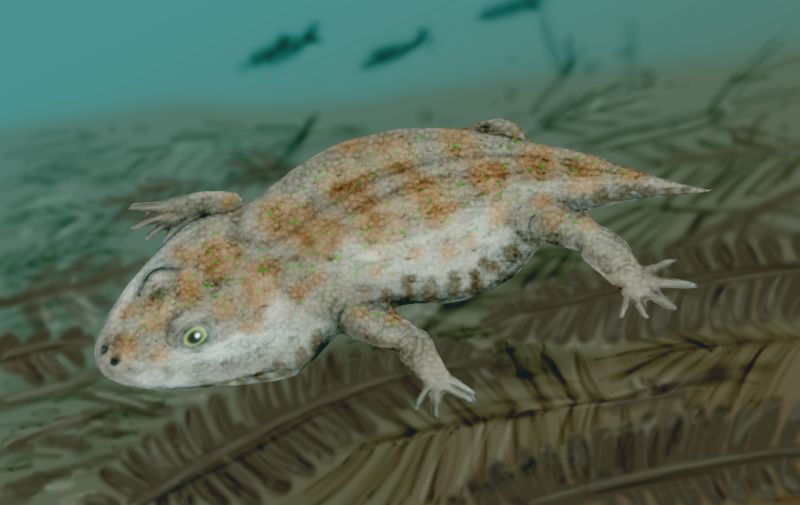
Amphibamus was a dissorophoid temnospondyl from the late Carboniferous of Illinois.

=== Fungi ===
As plants and animals were growing in size and abundance in this time, land fungi diversified further. Marine fungi still occupied the oceans. All modern classes of fungi were present in the late Carboniferous.

== Extinction events ==
=== Romer's gap ===
The first 15 million years of the Carboniferous had very limited terrestrial fossils. While it has long been debated whether the gap is a result of fossilisation or relates to an actual event, recent work indicates there was a drop in atmospheric oxygen levels, indicating some sort of ecological collapse. The gap saw the demise of the Devonian fish-like ichthyostegalian labyrinthodonts and the rise of the more advanced temnospondylian and reptiliomorphan amphibians that so typify the Carboniferous terrestrial vertebrate fauna.

=== Carboniferous rainforest collapse ===
Before the end of the Carboniferous, an extinction event occurred. On land this event is referred to as the Carboniferous rainforest collapse. Vast tropical rainforests collapsed suddenly as the climate changed from hot and humid to cool and arid. This was likely caused by intense glaciation and a drop in sea levels. The new climatic conditions were not favorable to the growth of rainforest and the animals within them. Rainforests shrank into isolated islands, surrounded by seasonally dry habitats. Towering lycopsid forests with a heterogeneous mixture of vegetation were replaced by much less diverse tree fern dominated flora.

Amphibians, the dominant vertebrates at the time, fared poorly through this event with large losses in biodiversity; reptiles continued to diversify through key adaptations that let them survive in the drier habitat, specifically the hard-shelled egg and scales, both of which retain water better than their amphibian counterparts.

== See also ==
- List of Carboniferous tetrapods – Amphibians and reptiles of the period
- Important Carboniferous Lagerstätten
  - Granton Shrimp Bed – Fossil-bearing deposit in Scotland; 359 mya; Edinburgh, Scotland
  - East Kirkton Quarry – Geological site in Scotland; c. 350 mya; Bathgate, Scotland
  - Bear Gulch Limestone – Paleontological site in Montana, USA; 324 mya; Montana, US
  - Mazon Creek fossil beds – Conservation lagerstätte in Illinois on the National Register of Historic Places; 309 mya; Illinois, US
  - Hamilton Quarry; 300 mya; Kansas, US
- List of fossil sites

== Sources ==
- Beerling, David (2007). The Emerald Planet: How Plants Changed Earth's History. Oxford University Press. ISBN 978-0-19-280602-4.
- "The Carboniferous Period". www.ucmp.berkeley.edu. Archived from the original on 2012-02-10.
- Biello, David (28 June 2012). "White Rot Fungi Slowed Coal Formation". Scientific American. Archived from the original on 30 June 2012.
- Blackwell, Meredith; Vilgalys, Rytas; James, Timothy Y.; Taylor, John W. (2008). "Fungi. Eumycota: mushrooms, sac fungi, yeast, molds, rusts, smuts, etc". Archived from the original on 2008-09-24.
- Conybeare, W. D.; Phillips, William (1822). Outlines of the geology of England and Wales: with an introductory compendium of the general principles of that science, and comparative views of the structure of foreign countries. Part I. London: William Phillips. OCLC 1435921.
- Cossey, P.J.; Adams, A.E.; Purnell, M.A.; Whiteley, M.J.; Whyte, M.A.; Wright, V.P. (2004). British Lower Carboniferous Stratigraphy. Geological Conservation Review. Peterborough: Joint Nature Conservation Committee. p. 3. ISBN 1-86107-499-9.
- Davydov, Vladimir; Glenister, Brian; Spinosa, Claude; Ritter, Scott; Chernykh, V.; Wardlaw, B.; Snyder, W. (March 1998). "Proposal of Aidaralash as Global Stratotype Section and Point (GSSP) for base of the Permian System" (PDF). Episodes. 21 (1): 11–18. Bibcode:1998Episo..21...11D. doi:10.18814/epiiugs/1998/v21i1/003. Archived (PDF) from the original on 2022-10-09.
- Dudley, Robert (24 March 1998). "Atmospheric Oxygen, Giant Paleozoic Insects and the Evolution of Aerial Locomotor Performance" (PDF). The Journal of Experimental Biology. 201 (Pt 8): 1043–1050. Bibcode:1998JExpB.201.1043D. doi:10.1242/jeb.201.8.1043. PMID 9510518. Archived (PDF) from the original on 24 January 2013.
- Floudas, D.; Binder, M.; Riley, R.; Barry, K.; Blanchette, R. A.; Henrissat, B.; Martinez, A. T.; et al. (28 June 2012). "The Paleozoic Origin of Enzymatic Lignin Decomposition Reconstructed from 31 Fungal Genomes". Science. 336 (6089): 1715–1719. Bibcode:2012Sci...336.1715F. doi:10.1126/science.1221748. hdl:10261/60626. OSTI 1165864. PMID 22745431. S2CID 37121590.
- Garwood, Russell J.; Edgecombe, Gregory (2011). "Early terrestrial animals, evolution and uncertainty". Evolution: Education and Outreach. 4 (3): 489–501. doi:10.1007/s12052-011-0357-y.
- Garwood, Russell J.; Dunlop, Jason A.; Sutton, Mark D. (2009). "High-fidelity X-ray micro-tomography reconstruction of siderite-hosted Carboniferous arachnids". Biology Letters. 5 (6): 841–844. Bibcode:2009BiLet...5..841G. doi:10.1098/rsbl.2009.0464. PMC 2828000. PMID 19656861.
- Garwood, Russell J.; Sutton, Mark D. (2010). "X-ray micro-tomography of Carboniferous stem-Dictyoptera: New insights into early insects". Biology Letters. 6 (5): 699–702. Bibcode:2010BiLet...6..699G. doi:10.1098/rsbl.2010.0199. PMC 2936155. PMID 20392720.
- Haq, B. U.; Schutter, SR (2008). "A Chronology of Paleozoic Sea-Level Changes". Science. 322 (5898): 64–68. Bibcode:2008Sci...322...64H. doi:10.1126/science.1161648. PMID 18832639. S2CID 206514545.
- Heckel, P.H. (2008). "Pennsylvanian cyclothems in Midcontinent North America as far-field effects of waxing and waning of Gondwana ice sheets". In Christopher R. Fielding; Tracy D. Frank; John L. Isbell (eds.). Resolving the Late Paleozoic Ice Age in Time and Space. Geological Society of America Special Papers. Vol. 441. pp. 275–289. doi:10.1130/2008.2441(19). ISBN 978-0-8137-2441-6.
- Hogan, C. Michael (2010). "Fern". Encyclopedia of Earth. Washington, DC: National council for Science and the Environment. Archived from the original on November 9, 2011.
- Kaiser, Sandra (1 April 2009). "The Devonian/Carboniferous boundary stratotype section (La Serre, France) revisited". Newsletters on Stratigraphy. 43 (2): 195–205. Bibcode:2009NewSt..43..195K. doi:10.1127/0078-0421/2009/0043-0195.
- Kazlev, M. Alan (1998). "The Carboniferous Period of the Paleozoic Era: 299 to 359 million years ago". Palaeos.org. Archived from the original on 2008-06-21.
- Krulwich, R. (2016). "The Fantastically Strange Origin of Most Coal on Earth". National Geographic. Archived from the original on August 11, 2018.
- Martin, R. Aidan. "A Golden Age of Sharks". Biology of Sharks and Rays | ReefQuest Centre for Shark Research. Archived from the original on 2008-05-22.
- Menning, M.; Alekseev, A.S.; Chuvashov, B.I.; Davydov, V.I.; Devuyst, F.X.; Forke, H.C.; Grunt, T.A.; et al. (2006). "Global time scale and regional stratigraphic reference scales of Central and West Europe, East Europe, Tethys, South China, and North America as used in the Devonian–Carboniferous–Permian Correlation Chart 2003 (DCP 2003)". Palaeogeography, Palaeoclimatology, Palaeoecology. 240 (1–2): 318–372. Bibcode:2006PPP...240..318M. doi:10.1016/j.palaeo.2006.03.058.
- Monastersky, Richard (13 May 1995). "Ancient Animals Got a Rise out of Oxygen". Science News – via HighBeam Research. ; ;
- Ogg, Jim (June 2004). "Overview of Global Boundary Stratotype Sections and Points (GSSP's)". Archived from the original on April 23, 2006.
- Paproth, Eva; Feist, Raimund; Flajs, Gerd (December 1991). "Decision on the Devonian-Carboniferous boundary stratotype" (PDF). Episodes. 14 (4): 331–336. doi:10.18814/epiiugs/1991/v14i4/004. Archived (PDF) from the original on 2022-10-09.
- Sahney, S.; Benton, M.J. & Falcon-Lang, H.J. (2010). "Rainforest collapse triggered Pennsylvanian tetrapod diversification in Euramerica". Geology. 38 (12): 1079–1082. Bibcode:2010Geo....38.1079S. doi:10.1130/G31182.1.
- Stanley, S.M. (1999). Earth System History. New York: W.H. Freeman and Company. ISBN 978-0-7167-2882-5.
- Rainer Zangerl and Gerard Ramon Case: Iniopterygia: a new order of Chondrichthyan fishes from the Pennsylvanian of North America. Fieldiana Geology Memoirs, v. 6, Field Museum of Natural History, 1973 Biodiversity Heritage Library (Volltext, engl.)
- Robinson, JM (1990). "Lignin, land plants, and fungi: Biological evolution affecting Phanerozoic oxygen balance". Geology. 18 (7): 607–610. Bibcode:1990Geo....18..607R. doi:10.1130/0091-7613(1990)018<0607:LLPAFB>2.3.CO;2.
- Scott, A. C.; Glasspool, I. J. (18 July 2006). "The diversification of Paleozoic fire systems and fluctuations in atmospheric oxygen concentration". Proceedings of the National Academy of Sciences. 103 (29): 10861–10865. Bibcode:2006PNAS..10310861S. doi:10.1073/pnas.0604090103. PMC 1544139. PMID 16832054.
- Verberk, Wilco C.E.P.; Bilton, David T. (July 27, 2011). "Can Oxygen Set Thermal Limits in an Insect and Drive Gigantism?". PLOS ONE. 6 (7) e22610. Bibcode:2011PLoSO...622610V. doi:10.1371/journal.pone.0022610. PMC 3144910. PMID 21818347.
- Ward, P.; Labandeira, Conrad; Laurin, Michel; Berner, Robert A. (November 7, 2006). "Confirmation of Romer's Gap is a low oxygen interval constraining the timing of initial arthropod and vertebrate terrestrialization". Proceedings of the National Academy of Sciences. 103 (45): 16818–16822. Bibcode:2006PNAS..10316818W. doi:10.1073/pnas.0607824103. PMC 1636538. PMID 17065318.
- Wells, John (3 April 2008). Longman Pronunciation Dictionary (3rd ed.). Pearson Longman. ISBN 978-1-4058-8118-0.
- "A History of Palaeozoic Forests - Part 2 The Carboniferous coal swamp forests". Forschungsstelle für Paläobotanik. Westfälische Wilhelms-Universität Münster. Archived from the original on 2012-09-20.
