= Silesian (series) =

System	Series (NW Europe)	Stage (NW Europe)	Sub-system (ICS)	Stage (ICS)	Age (Ma)
Permian					younger
Carboniferous	Silesian	Stephanian	Pennsylvanian	Gzhelian	298.9–303.7
Carboniferous	Silesian	Stephanian	Pennsylvanian	Kasimovian	303.7–307.0
Carboniferous	Silesian	Westphalian	Pennsylvanian	Moscovian	307.0–315.2
Carboniferous	Silesian	Westphalian	Pennsylvanian	Bashkirian	315.2–323.4
Carboniferous	Silesian	Namurian	Pennsylvanian	Bashkirian	315.2–323.4
Carboniferous	Silesian	Namurian	Mississippian	Serpukhovian	323.4–330.3
Carboniferous	Dinantian	Visean	Mississippian	Visean	330.3–346.7
Carboniferous	Dinantian	Tournaisian	Mississippian	Tournaisian	346.7–358.9
Devonian					older
Subdivisions of the Carboniferous system in Europe compared with the official ICS-stages (as of 2024)

The Silesian is a subdivision (a series or epoch) of the Carboniferous system or period in the geologic timescale of western and central Europe. It was named for Silesia, a region that stretches over the Czech Republic, Poland and Germany.

== Geology ==
The Silesian follows or lies on top of the Dinantian epoch/series and lasted from roughly 330 to 299 Ma ago.

The base of the Silesian was defined in 1958 as the first occurrence of the ammonoid Cravenoceras leion, the top is defined by the first appearance of the conodont Streptognathodus isolatus.

=== Subdivisions ===
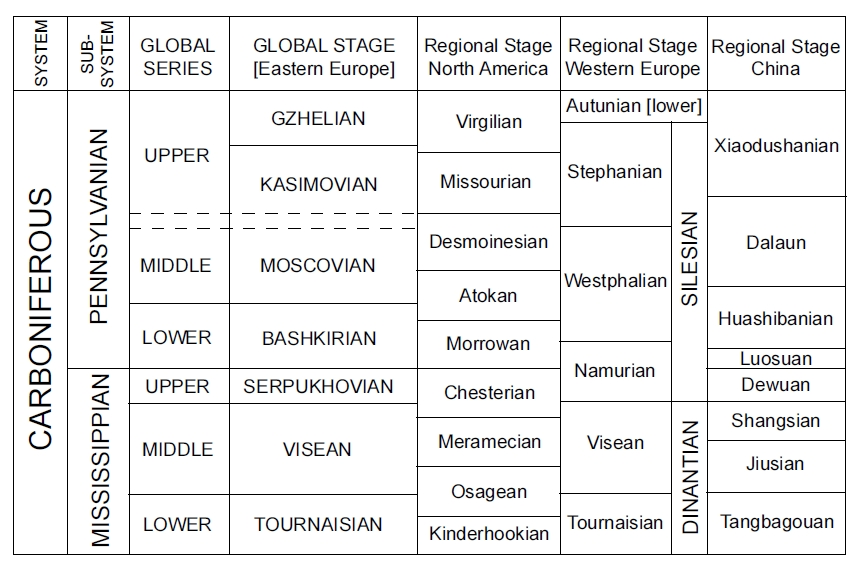
Carboniferous global and regional subdivisions comparison chart (as of 2006)

The Silesian is subdivided into three stages, from young (upper) to old (lower):

- Stephanian
- Westphalian
- Namurian.

== See also ==
- Carboniferous geochronology
- Carboniferous Europe
