= Dinantian =

Series of rocks from the Lower Carboniferous

System	Series (NW Europe)	Stage (NW Europe)	Sub-system (ICS)	Stage (ICS)	Age (Ma)
Permian					younger
Carboniferous	Silesian	Stephanian	Pennsylvanian	Gzhelian	298.9–303.7
Carboniferous	Silesian	Stephanian	Pennsylvanian	Kasimovian	303.7–307.0
Carboniferous	Silesian	Westphalian	Pennsylvanian	Moscovian	307.0–315.2
Carboniferous	Silesian	Westphalian	Pennsylvanian	Bashkirian	315.2–323.4
Carboniferous	Silesian	Namurian	Pennsylvanian	Bashkirian	315.2–323.4
Carboniferous	Silesian	Namurian	Mississippian	Serpukhovian	323.4–330.3
Carboniferous	Dinantian	Visean	Mississippian	Visean	330.3–346.7
Carboniferous	Dinantian	Tournaisian	Mississippian	Tournaisian	346.7–358.9
Devonian					older
Subdivisions of the Carboniferous system in Europe compared with the official ICS-stages (as of 2024)

The Dinantian is a series or epoch from the Lower Carboniferous system in western Europe between 359.2 and 326.4 million years ago. It can stand for a series of rocks in Europe or the time span in which they were deposited.

The Dinantian is equal to the lower part of the Mississippian series in the international geologic timescale of the ICS. The Dinantian is named for the Belgian city of Dinant where strata of this age occur. The name is still used among European geologists.

Earlier terms for the Dinantian were Bernician from the Anglo-Scottish borderland, and Avonian (divided into upper (Kidwellian) and lower (Clevedonian) substages) from Kidwelly on the Welsh and Clevedon on the English sides of the Bristol Channel.
