= Stephanian (stage) =

System	Series (NW Europe)	Stage (NW Europe)	Sub-system (ICS)	Stage (ICS)	Age (Ma)
Permian					younger
Carboniferous	Silesian	Stephanian	Pennsylvanian	Gzhelian	298.9–303.7
Carboniferous	Silesian	Stephanian	Pennsylvanian	Kasimovian	303.7–307.0
Carboniferous	Silesian	Westphalian	Pennsylvanian	Moscovian	307.0–315.2
Carboniferous	Silesian	Westphalian	Pennsylvanian	Bashkirian	315.2–323.4
Carboniferous	Silesian	Namurian	Pennsylvanian	Bashkirian	315.2–323.4
Carboniferous	Silesian	Namurian	Mississippian	Serpukhovian	323.4–330.3
Carboniferous	Dinantian	Visean	Mississippian	Visean	330.3–346.7
Carboniferous	Dinantian	Tournaisian	Mississippian	Tournaisian	346.7–358.9
Devonian					older
Subdivisions of the Carboniferous system in Europe compared with the official ICS-stages (as of 2024)

The Stephanian is a stage in the regional stratigraphy of northwest Europe with an age between roughly 307.5 and 299 Ma (million years ago). It is a subdivision of the Carboniferous system or period and the regional Silesian series. The uppermost units of the Coal Measures of England and Wales are probably of Stephanian age, though the larger part of this formation is referred to the earlier Westphalian. The stage derives its name from the city of Saint-Étienne for its coal mining basin in eastern central France (which itself derives from associations with Saint Stephen) where strata of this age occur.

In the official geologic timescale of the ICS, the Stephanian is placed within the Pennsylvanian epoch (323-299 Ma).

The (regionally defined) Stephanian stage corresponds to the (internationally used) Kasimovian and Gzhelian stages. References appear in scientific literature to a Stephanian epoch or Stephanian series reflecting the stage's earlier status. Sediments younger than the Stephanian are sometimes termed the Autunian, a regional stage which includes the Carboniferous-Permian boundary.

== Stratigraphy ==
From youngest to oldest, the proposed substages of the Stephanian are:

- Stephanian C
- Stephanian B
- "Saberian" [correlation uncertain]
- Barruelian (Stephanian A)
- Cantabrian

=== Base of the Stephanian ===
The Westphalian-Stephanian boundary is controversial and has not been formally defined. The early part of the Stephanian is difficult to recognize in much of Europe, due to sediment hiatuses or a transition from coal to unfossiliferous red beds. This issue is most apparent in the Lorraine-Saar-Nahe Basin of France and Germany, where a long hiatus occupies several million years between the Westphalian D and Stephanian A substages.

Several workarounds have been proposed, but many bring forward their own problems. Many sources err on the side of caution and position the start of the Stephanian at the end of the hiatus. By that time, Kasimovian-type plant species are well-established, suggesting that part of the Westphalian D is Kasimovian in age. Other studies disagree with this approach, instead defining the Westphalian-Stephanian boundary at a major transition of plant faunas prior to the hiatus.

Northwest Spain seems to offer a potential solution to the debate, since the regions of Asturias and Cantabria offer undisrupted and fossil-rich sediments which appear to fill in the gap between Westphalian D and Stephanian A. Most Carboniferous stratigraphers accept the utility of this interval, which has been named as the "Cantabrian" substage, the earliest substage of the Stephanian. Kasimovian-type plants first appear just above the base of the Cantabrian, arguing that the base of the Stephanian is slightly older than the start of the Kasimovian (around 307 Ma).
