= Westphalian (stage) =

System	Series (NW Europe)	Stage (NW Europe)	Sub-system (ICS)	Stage (ICS)	Age (Ma)
Permian					younger
Carboniferous	Silesian	Stephanian	Pennsylvanian	Gzhelian	298.9–303.7
Carboniferous	Silesian	Stephanian	Pennsylvanian	Kasimovian	303.7–307.0
Carboniferous	Silesian	Westphalian	Pennsylvanian	Moscovian	307.0–315.2
Carboniferous	Silesian	Westphalian	Pennsylvanian	Bashkirian	315.2–323.4
Carboniferous	Silesian	Namurian	Pennsylvanian	Bashkirian	315.2–323.4
Carboniferous	Silesian	Namurian	Mississippian	Serpukhovian	323.4–330.3
Carboniferous	Dinantian	Visean	Mississippian	Visean	330.3–346.7
Carboniferous	Dinantian	Tournaisian	Mississippian	Tournaisian	346.7–358.9
Devonian					older
Subdivisions of the Carboniferous system in Europe compared with the official ICS-stages (as of 2024)

The Westphalian is a regional stage or age in the regional stratigraphy of northwest Europe, with an age between roughly 315 and 307 Ma (million years ago). It is a subdivision of the Carboniferous System or Period and the regional Silesian Series. The Westphalian is named for the region of Westphalia (German: Westfalen) in western Germany where strata of this age occur. The Coal Measures of England and Wales are also largely of Westphalian age, though they also extend into the succeeding Stephanian.

The Westphalian is preceded by the Namurian Stage/Age (which corresponds to the Millstone Grit Series of Great Britain) and succeeded by the Stephanian Stage/Age (which corresponds to the uppermost part of the Coal Measures of Great Britain).

In the official geologic time scale of the International Commission on Stratigraphy (ICS), the Westphalian is placed within the Pennsylvanian Subsystem/Subperiod (323-299 Ma) of the Carboniferous System/Period. As a regionally defined stage, the Westphalian overlaps with official ICS stages which are in use on an international level. The Westphalian extends from the approximately the upper half of the Bashkirian Stage through the Moscovian Stage, and possibly includes a small portion of the Kasimovian Stage. Many older scientific sources refer to the Westphalian as an epoch or series, which are higher geological ranks than its current status.

== Stratigraphy ==
Since 1935, the Westphalian has been split into four substages, from oldest to youngest: Langsettian (Westphalian A), Duckmantian (Westphalian B), Bolsovian (Westphalian C), and "Asturian" (Westphalian D). These substages are defined by guide fossils, or "index fossils," particularly plant macrofossils, miospores, and ammonoids. The Westphalian exhibits distinctive changes in plant diversity, and many plant macrofossil assemblage zones have been defined across an area encompassing Europe, Turkey, and the Maritime Provinces of Canada.

=== Langsettian ===
The Langsettian, previously known as Westphalian A, is named after the village of Langsett in South Yorkshire, England. It marks the base of the Westphalian regional stage, as defined by the ammonoid Gastrioceras subcrenatum. The base of the Langsettian (and the Westphalian as a whole) has been dated to around 319.9 or 319.2 Ma.

The Langsettian corresponds to the Calymmotheca ("Lyginopteris") hoeninghausii assemblage zone. Many widespread plant species first appear near the base of the Langsettian, indicating a spike of diversification in tropical coal swamp habitats. Plant diversity steadily increases through the entire Langsettian, though this may be a result of ecological factors such as the receding coastline.

=== Duckmantian ===
The Duckmantian, previously known as Westphalian B, is named after the village of Duckmanton in Derbyshire, England. The base of the Duckmantian is defined by the ammonoid Anthracoceratites vaderbeckei. The boundary between the global Bashkirian and Moscovian stages (~315.2 Ma) corresponds to the mid-late part of the Duckmantian.

The lower-middle part of the Duckmantian corresponds to the Lonchopteris rugosa Assemblage-zone, the most diverse plant biozone in the Carboniferous coalfields of Europe. The rising diversity trend of the Langsettian continues into this biozone, with few notable changes in species composition. In the majority of European coalfields, plant diversity reached a plateau around halfway through the Duckmantian. Coal swamps became increasingly unstable in the Paripteris linguaefolia assemblage zone, which begins in the upper part of the Duckmantian.

=== Bolsovian ===
The Bolsovian, previously known as Westphalian C, is named after the town of Bolsover in Derbyshire. The base of the Bolsovian is defined by the ammonoid Donetzoceras aegiranum, and has an estimated age of around 313.8 or 313.7 Ma.

The Paripteris linguaefolia assemblage zone continues into the Bolsovian, and a decline in plant diversity is apparent across the entirety of Europe. In a few coalfields, such as the Nord-Pas-des-Calais basin of northern France, the decline is delayed until the mid-Bolsovian, while in other areas it may begin as early as the late Duckmantian. The overall downward diversity trend is slight, but several notable lycopsid and sphenopsid species disappear from European coal swamps at this time.

=== Westphalian D ===
Westphalian D is often referred to as the Asturian, named after the Asturias region of northwest Spain. In most of Europe, Westphalian D is distinguished by plant fossils. Asturias is one of the few European regions with enough late Westphalian marine fossils to allow for precise correlations with other marine strata. The proposal to fully implement the name "Asturian" has yet to be ratified, as some stratigraphic difficulties in Spain are not fully resolved.

The lower part of the Asturian belongs to the Linopteris obliqua assemblage zone (sometimes termed the Linopteris bunburii zone). This biozone is notably lower in diversity than previous Westphalian biozones. Plant fossils are still common over much of Europe, with Neuropteris ovata as a particularly abundant species. An important ecological turnover occurs about halfway through the Asturian (~309 Ma), with the arrival of the Crenulopteris acadica assemblage zone (previously known as the Lobatopteris vestita zone). Lycopsid fossils become very rare, while marattialean ferns become abundant in coal swamp deposits. Many European coalfields were positioned in a foreland basin north of the Variscan orogeny. As mountain-building continued, uplift accelerated in the basin, endangering the survival of coal swamp environments.

Plant fossils (and coal deposits as a whole) are uncommon in the following "Cantabrian" substage of the Stephanian Stage. The end of the Asturian is a topic of strong debate; most estimates place the Westphalian-Stephanian boundary before the start of the Kasimovian global stage (~307 Ma), whereas a few place the boundary within the Kasimovian. U-Pb radiometric dating of tonstein beds in Spain estimate that the Asturian lasted from 310.7 to 307.5 Ma, ending just prior to the Kasimovian.

== Life ==
The Westphalian interval is widely recognized for its coal deposits—rocks that were deposited broadly across regions that were in low paleolatitudes. These deposits, from so-called "coal swamps" have yielded rich assemblages of fossils including spore-bearing and seed-bearing plants, fishes, and tetrapods. Amphibians were diverse and dominated some communities. The collapse of the rainforest ecology between the Moscovian and Kasimovian removed many amphibian species that did not survive as well in the cooler, drier conditions. Reptiles, however prospered due to specific key adaptations and underwent a major evolutionary radiation, in response to the drier climate that led to the rainforest collapse.
