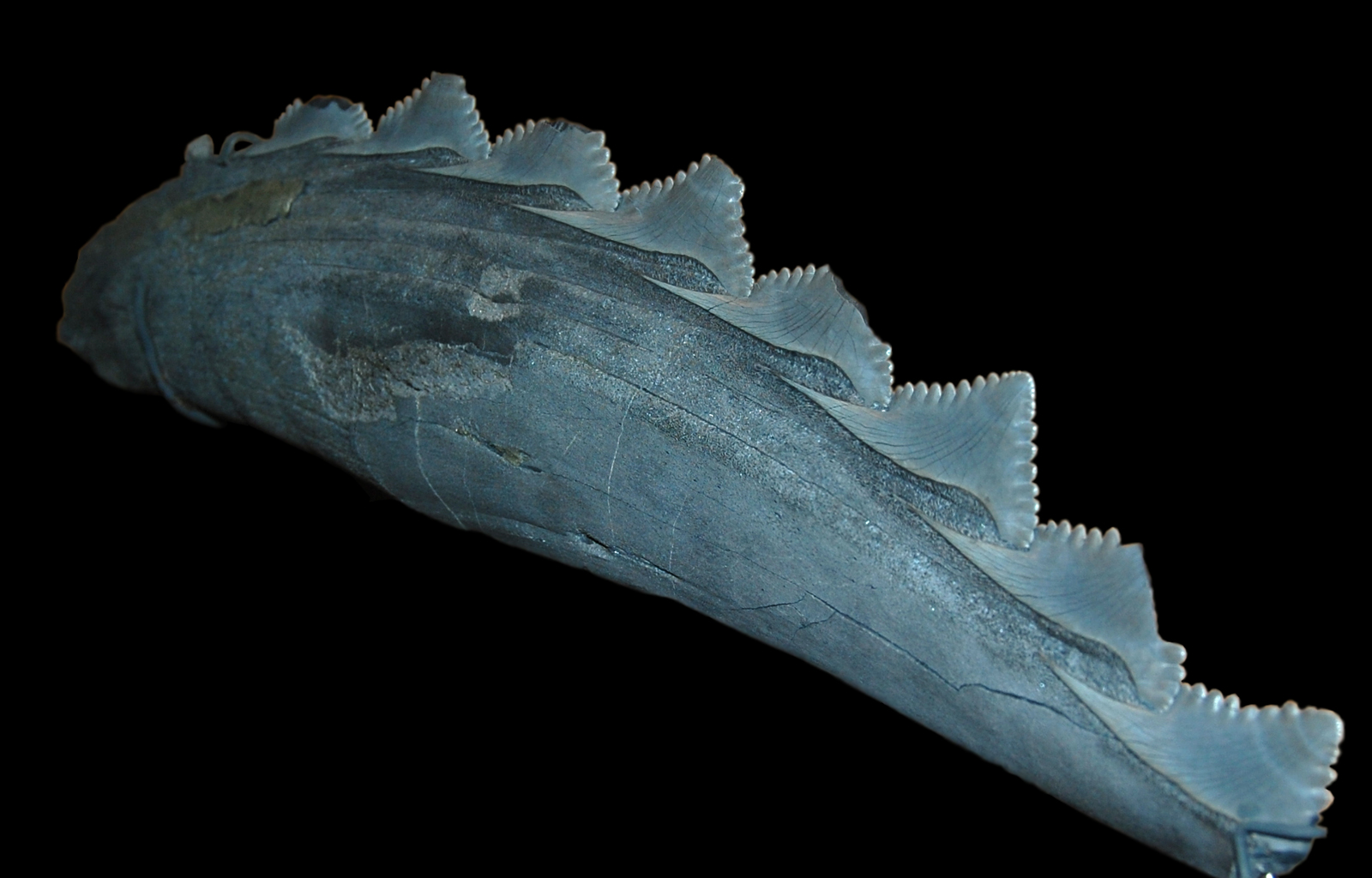
- Jaw whorl of Edestus

Scientific classification
- Kingdom: Animalia
- Phylum: Chordata
- Class: Chondrichthyes
- Subclass: Holocephali
- Order: †Eugeneodontiformes
- Family: †Edestidae
- Genus: †Edestus; Leidy, 1856

Species
- E. vorax Leidy, 1856; E. minor Newberry in Newberry and Worthen, 1866; E. heinrichi Newberry and Worthen, 1870; E. triserratus Newton, 1904; E. newtoni? Woodward, 1916

Synonyms
- Edestes Miller, 1877; Edestodus Obruchev, 1953; Lestrodus? Obruchev, 1953; Protopirata Trautschold, 1888

= Edestus =

Edestus Temporal range: Pennsylvanian (Bashkirian to Moscovian), 313–307 Ma

Extinct genus of cartilaginous fish

Edestus is an extinct genus of eugeneodontid holocephalian fish known from the Late Carboniferous (Pennsylvanian) of the United Kingdom, Russia, and the United States. Most remains consist of isolated curved blades or "whorls" that are studded with teeth, that in life were situated within the midline of the upper and lower jaws. Edestus is a Greek name derived from the word edeste (to devour), in reference to the aberrant quality and size of the species' teeth.

The largest species, E. heinrichi, has been conservatively estimated to reach greater than 6.7 m (22 ft) in length, around the size of the largest known great white shark, possibly making it the largest marine predator known to have ever existed up to that point. Like its other relatives, such as Helicoprion, and unlike modern sharks, the species of Edestus grew teeth in curved blades or "whorls". In Edestus' case, only a single row of teeth occurred in the midline of each jaw, leading Edestus to sometimes be described as the "scissor tooth shark". The degree of curvature in the teeth brackets, along with size, are distinct in each species.

== History of discovery ==
Edestus was first described by Joseph Leidy in 1856. The type species is Edestus vorax, the holotype specimen (ANSP 9899) is very fragmentary and of uncertain stratigraphic and geographic provenance, reported to be from Muskogee County, Oklahoma, though this has been questioned. In 1855 Edward Hitchcock presented a specimen of Edestus to the American Association for the Advancement of Science meeting at Providence, Rhode Island the specimen (a tooth whorl) had been originally found in Parke County, Indiana. The specimen was loaned to famed British anatomist Richard Owen in 1861, who referred the specimen to Edestus and suggested that it was a fin spine. Edestus minor was described in 1866 by John Strong Newberry based on AMNH FF477, a single crown that lacks most of the root from Posey County, Indiana. Edestus heinrichi was described in 1870 by Newberry and Amos Henry Worthen from a now-lost specimen found in Illinois. Edestus triserratus was described in 1904 by Edwin Tulley Newton, from GSM 31410, which was found in the Coal Measures in Staffordshire, England which is a partial tooth lacking the apex of the crown. Oliver Perry Hay in 1912 was the first to describe an associated pair of upper and lower tooth whorls (USNM V7255), found in a coal mine near Lehigh, Iowa, which he assigned to the new species Edestus mirus, now thought to be a synonym of Edestus minor. Specimens of Edestus are also known from the Moscow Basin on the Russian Platform. Edestus karpinskii was described by A.B. Missuna in 1908 from remains found near Kolomna around 100 km southeast of Moscow. Edestus minusculus was described by Hay in 1912 from a specimen originally described by Alexander Karpinsky as Edestus cf. minor from a specimen found at the Myachkova quarry, near Moscow.

== Description ==
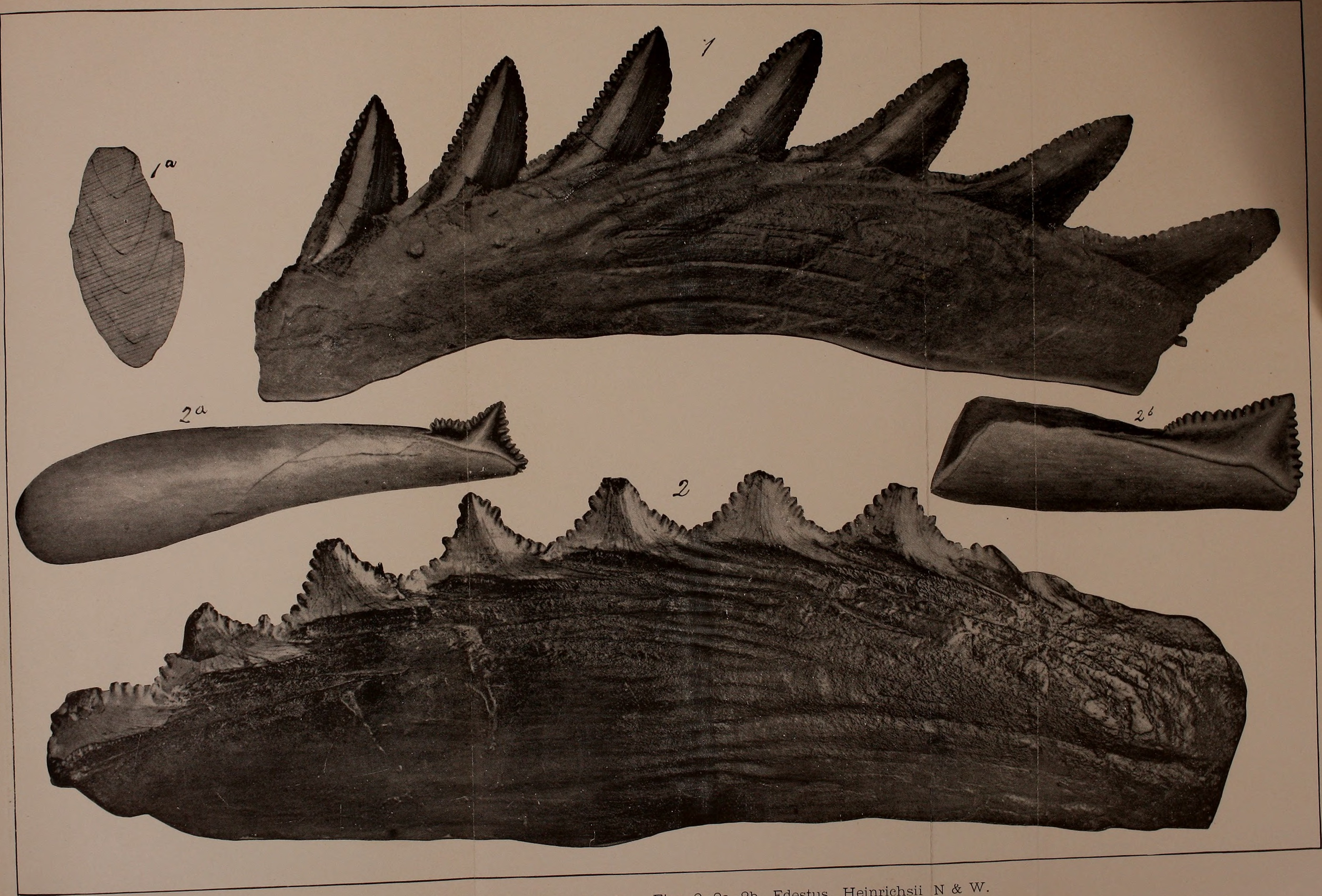
Tooth whorls of Edestus as well as isolated teeth and roots

The whorls of Edestus are composed of numerous serrated teeth that have long v-shaped roots that are stacked on top of each other akin to roof tiling. Up to a dozen teeth are present in each whorl at any one time. Teeth grew in the back end (posterior) of the whorl, and gradually migrated forward through the whorl, before being ejected at the front end (anterior). Up to 40 teeth could have grown in each whorl during the lifetime of the animal. The upper and lower whorls are distinct in their morphology, with the lower whorl having a greater degree of curvature.

Restoration of the skull of E. heinrichi

As with most cartilaginous fish, preserved skeletal material is rare, due to the cartilage of the skeleton having a poor potential for fossilisation. Several specimens with the preserved cranial remains of Edestus have been reported, the most important being FMNH PF2204, a crushed juvenile specimen, likely representative of E. heinrichi, which preserves both upper and lower blades in association with a well preserved chondrocranium and jaws. The Meckel's cartilage of the lower jaw is approximately 1.5 times the length of the lower whorl, the end of the lower whorl extends forward beyond the edge of the Meckel's cartilage. The Meckel's cartilage was articulated with a slender quadrate via a socket in the Meckel's cartilage which articulated with a process of the quadrate. The quadrate at its other end articulated with the otic process of the chondrocranium, the structure that houses the brain and sensory organs. The upper tooth blade was rigidly held between two plates of palatine cartilage, which at their front ends are crescent shaped, matching the curvature of the tooth whorl, with the upper whorl extending forward beyond the cartilage. The chondrocranium was capped by a shield-shaped dorsal plate.

No postcranial remains are known of Edestus. However, postcranial remains are known for other eugeneodont genera. Eugeneodonts with preserved postcrania include the Pennsylvanian to Triassic-age caseodontoids Caseodus, Fadenia, and Romerodus. These taxa have a fusiform (streamlined, torpedo-shaped) body plan, with triangular pectoral fins. There is a single large and triangular dorsal fin without a fin spine, and a tall, forked caudal fin which externally appears to be homocercal (with two equally-sized lobes). This general body plan is shared by active, open-water predatory fish such as tuna, swordfish, and lamnid sharks. Eugeneodonts also lack pelvic and anal fins, and judging by Romerodus, they would have had broad keels along the side of the body up to the caudal fin. Fadenia had five well-exposed gill slits, possibly with a vestigial sixth gill. There is no evidence of the specialized gill basket and fleshy operculum present in living chimaeroids.

The cranium of FMNH PF2204 is around 25 centimetres (9.8 in) in length, and the associated upper and lower whorls have lengths of 10.4 and 8 centimetres (4.1 and 3.1 in), respectively. The largest known individuals of E. heinrichi are an upper whorl 32 centimetres (13 in) in length and a lower whorl 43 centimetres (17 in) in length. The estimated minimum length of the skulls of these individuals based on allometry are around 77 and 134 centimetres (30 and 53 in), respectively. Based on a 5:1 body length to head ratio, this suggests that individuals of E. heinrichi could reach lengths of about or more than 6.7 m (22 ft). This estimate has been corroborated by Engelman (2023) based on allometric scaling, who also suggested that Edestus was likely the largest marine predator to have ever existed up until that point, given that earlier large predators like Dunkleosteus were probably smaller than previously thought.

== Classification and species ==
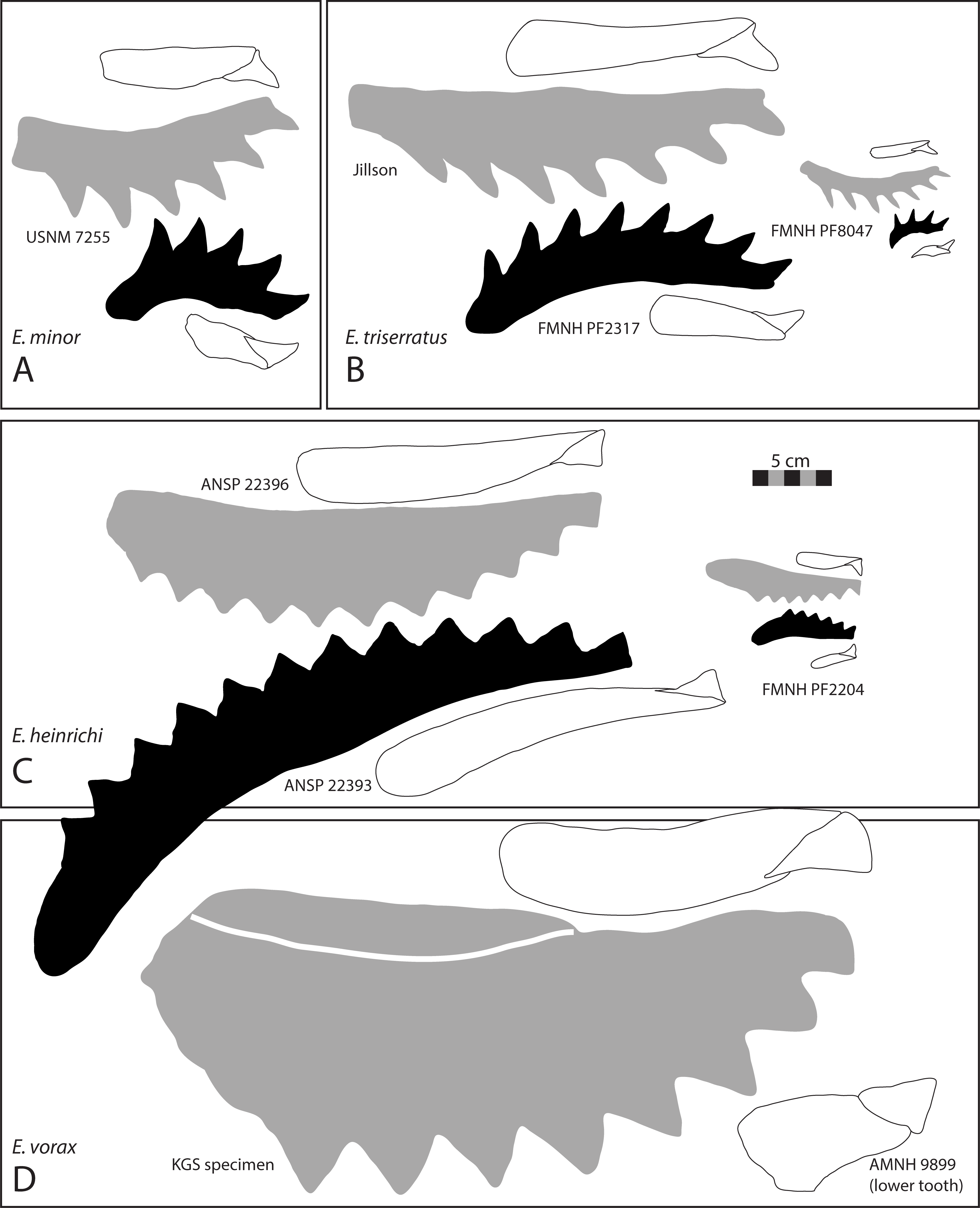
Comparison of the four species of Edestus

13 species of Edestus have been named, but in a 2019 morphometric analysis only 4 were considered valid, which span a six million year interval in the Late Carboniferous (313-307 million years ago). Species of Edestus are divided into two groups, those which have asymmetrical crowns that slant forwards, and those with symmetrical ones. The earliest known species are from the late Bashkirian of the United Kingdom, with the first appearances in Russia and the United States during the Moscovian, corresponding to a rise in sea level.

=== Asymmetric crowns ===
- E. triserratus Newton, 1904 (syn Edestus minusculus Hay, 1909, Edestodus kolomnensis (Lebedev, 2001)) Late Bashkirian to Moscovian, United States, United Kingdom and Russia distinguished by having obtuse triangular crowns that narrow to a "bullet shaped" apex, the denticles are fine and the root is proportionally longer than E. minor upper whorl has a massive straight base, while the lower whorl is slender and more tightly curved
- E. minor Newberry in Newberry and Worthen, 1866 (syn E. mirus Hay, 1912 E. pringlei Watson, 1930) Late Bashkirian to Moscovian, United States and United Kingdom distinguished from other species by obtuse tapered crowns with fine denticles and a strongly curved lower whorl

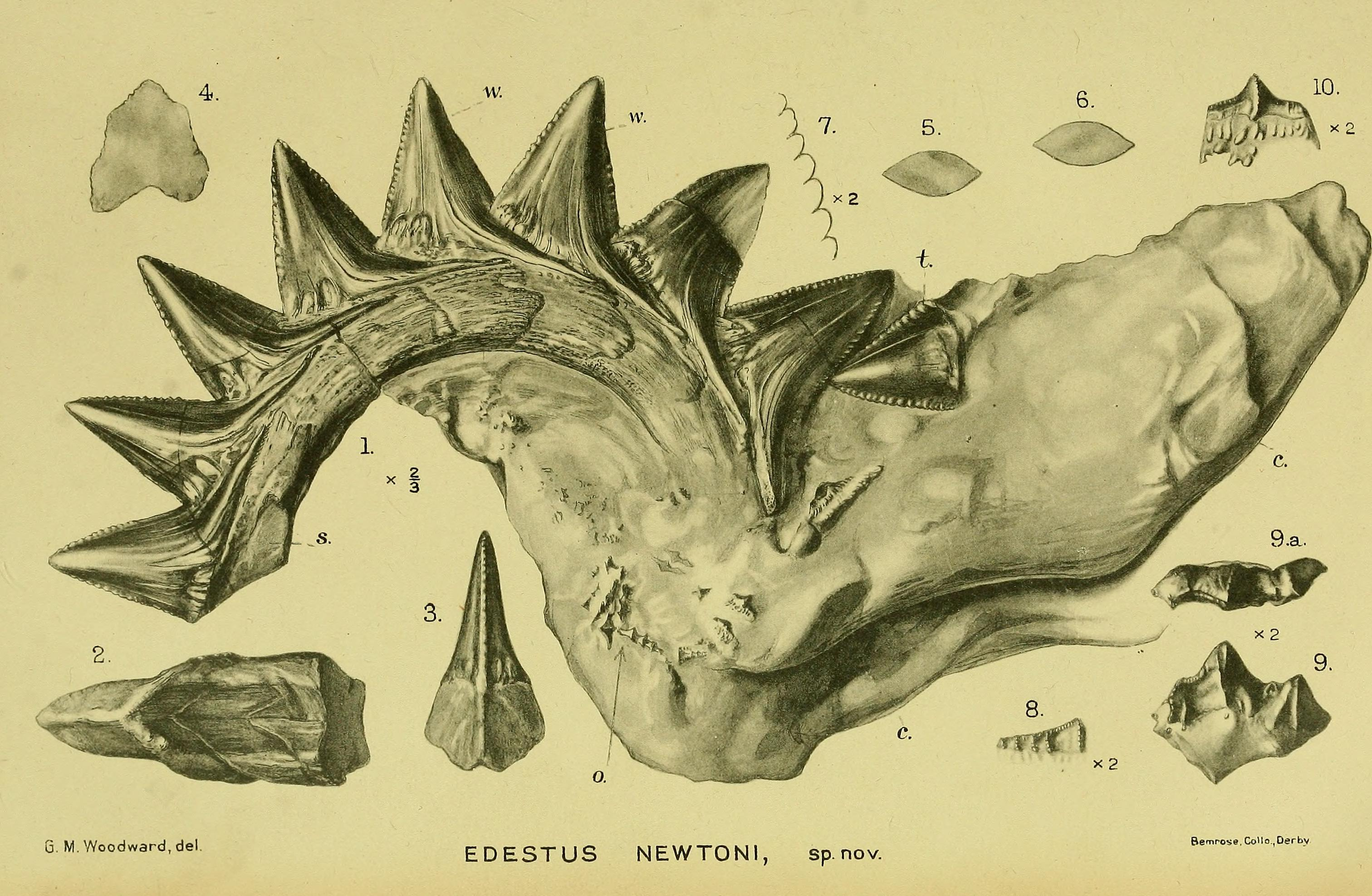
Tooth whorl of Edestus newtoni, which is much more curved than other members of Edestus

=== Symmetric crowns ===
- E. heinrichi Newberry and Worthen, 1870 (syn E. protopirata Trautschold, 1879, Protopirata centrodon Trautschold, 1888, E. karpinskyi Missuna, 1908, E. crenulatus Hay, 1909, E. serratus Hay, 1909) Moscovian of the United States and Russia, distinguished by having crowns with an acute triangular shape, with a slightly longer posterior than anterior edge, coarse denticles, and long and straight roots in the upper whorl, slightly curved in the lower whorl
- E. vorax Leidy, 1856 (syn E. giganteus Newberry, 1889) Moscovian of the United States distinguished by crowns with acute triangular shape, a slightly longer posterior edge, very coarse denticles, stout roots that extend deep beneath the tooth crown, and intermediate apex angle

Edestus newtoni, described by Arthur Smith Woodward in 1916 from the "Millstone Grit" of Yorkshire, United Kingdom, has a much greater curvature of the whorl than other species of Edestus, and has sometimes been placed in its own genus Lestrodus. A placement in a separate genus is supported by its lack of a convex bulge opposite the tooth crowns, which is present on all other species of Edestus.

== Paleobiology ==
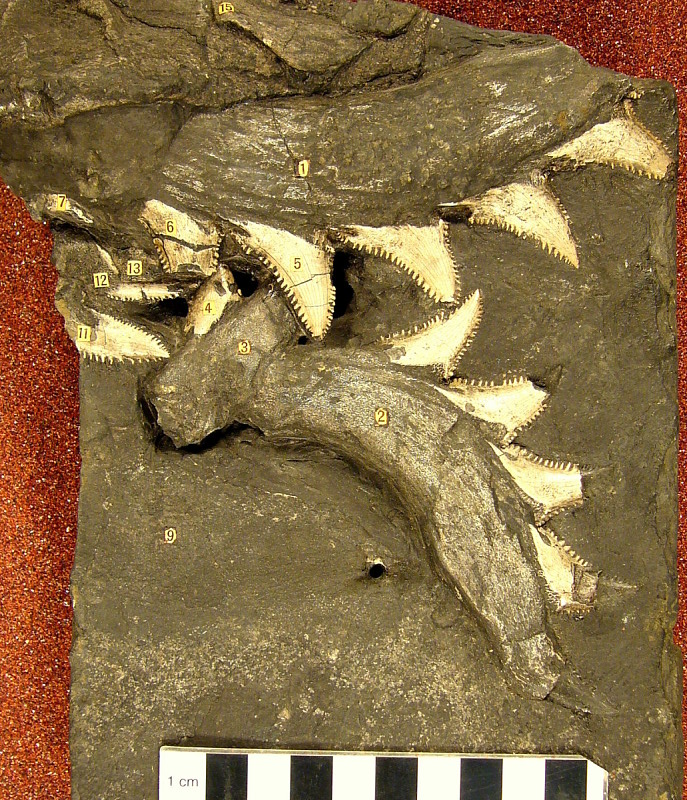
Type specimen of "Edestus mirus" (E. minor) with preserved jaw cartilage

Due to the unusual nature of the tooth whorls and the historic lack of cranial material, many hypotheses for how the whorls functioned have been proposed. Early researchers suggested that they may have been defensive spines located on the fins, external slashing weapons, or oral teeth. Researchers such as Edwin Newton proposed it was likely attached to the dorsal fin specifically, while other such as Edward Drinker Cope believed they were paired structures attached to the pectoral fins. The specimen described by Oliver Hay in 1912 as Edestus mirus preserved two whorls still attached to fragments of jaw cartilage, and definitively showed that the whorls were situated in the mouth.

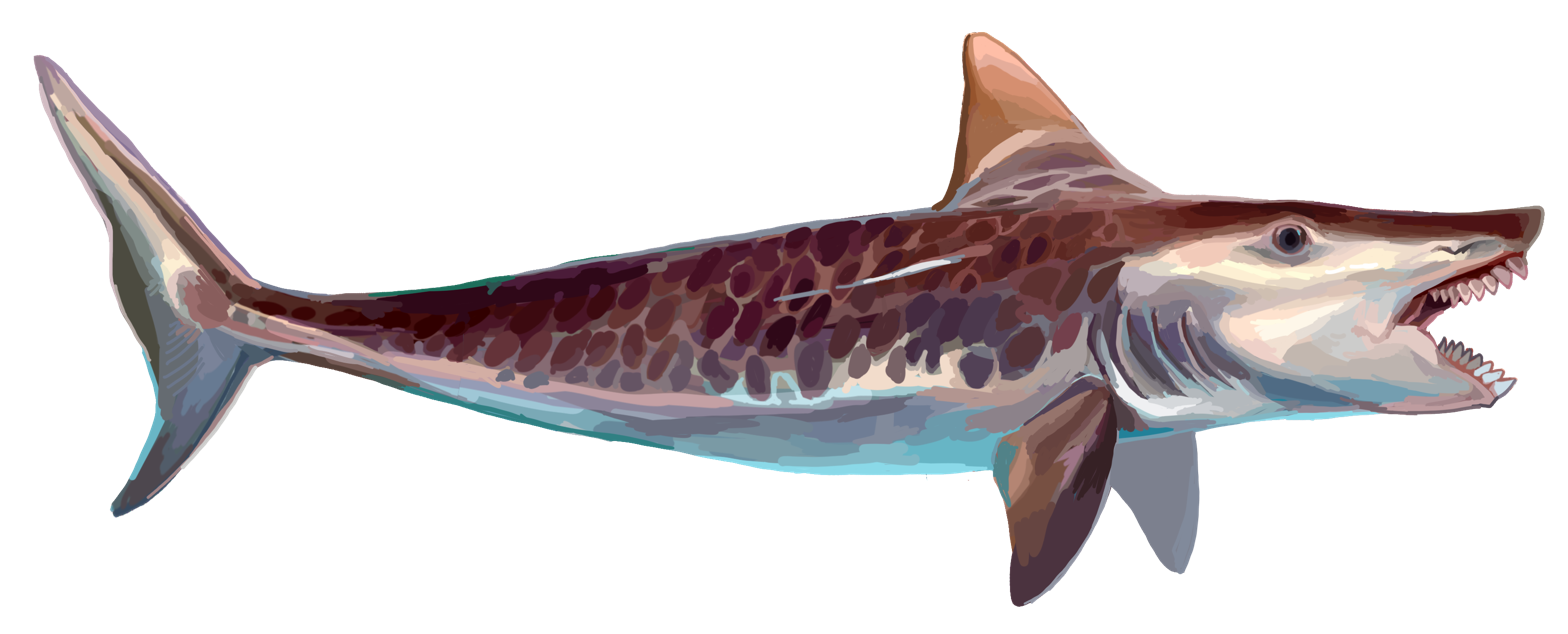
Hypothetical reconstruction of the full body of Edestus, based on other eugeneodonts

Following the first detailed descriptions of the genus' skull in 2004, researchers Rainer Zangerl and Clifford Jeremiah proposed two alternative feeding strategies: either it was an active predator which killed fish by ramming them with its mouth open and then using its whorls like scissors to cut them apart, or it was a specialist jellyfish feeder. The latter interpretation was proposed because of the rarity of wear on the observed specimen's tooth crowns and comparison with the living pelagic stingray, while the former was questioned because of the genus' apparent inability to swallow food without a highly specialized jaw mechanism. In a series of publications in the mid-late 2010s, researcher Wayne M. Itano proposed that the whorls were used similarly to the rostra of living sawfish, albeit arranged vertically. He found that the dental microwear of E. minor suggests that the protruding, forward-directed teeth of the tooth-whorls may have been used to slash and disable prey with vertical motions of the body. Itano also found that E. heinrichi teeth showed wear that indicates that the animal preyed or scavenged on large fish covered in armored scales or denticles. In their detailed 2018 redescription of the cranial material of Edestus, Tapanila and colleagues found that the less curved tooth whorls of some Edestus species functioned as effective grasping and slicing tools for soft bodied prey such as cephalopods. Their research showed that the jaws of Edestus were operated by a "two gear" system, involving double jointing of a unique quadrate bone, that allowed for forward and backward movement of the lower jaw similar to the cranial kinesis seen in living squamates. The authors proposed that during prey approach, adductor muscles pulled the Meckel's cartilage (lower jaw) upwards and forwards to close the jaw, causing each tooth to slice roughly three times its length, and to further push the prey into the teeth of the upper whorl. During the subsequent opening of the jaw mouth the Meckel's cartilage moved backwards and downwards by the adductor muscles, causing further slicing. They calculated that Edestus had a bite force of up to 1907 newtons.

== Paleoecology ==
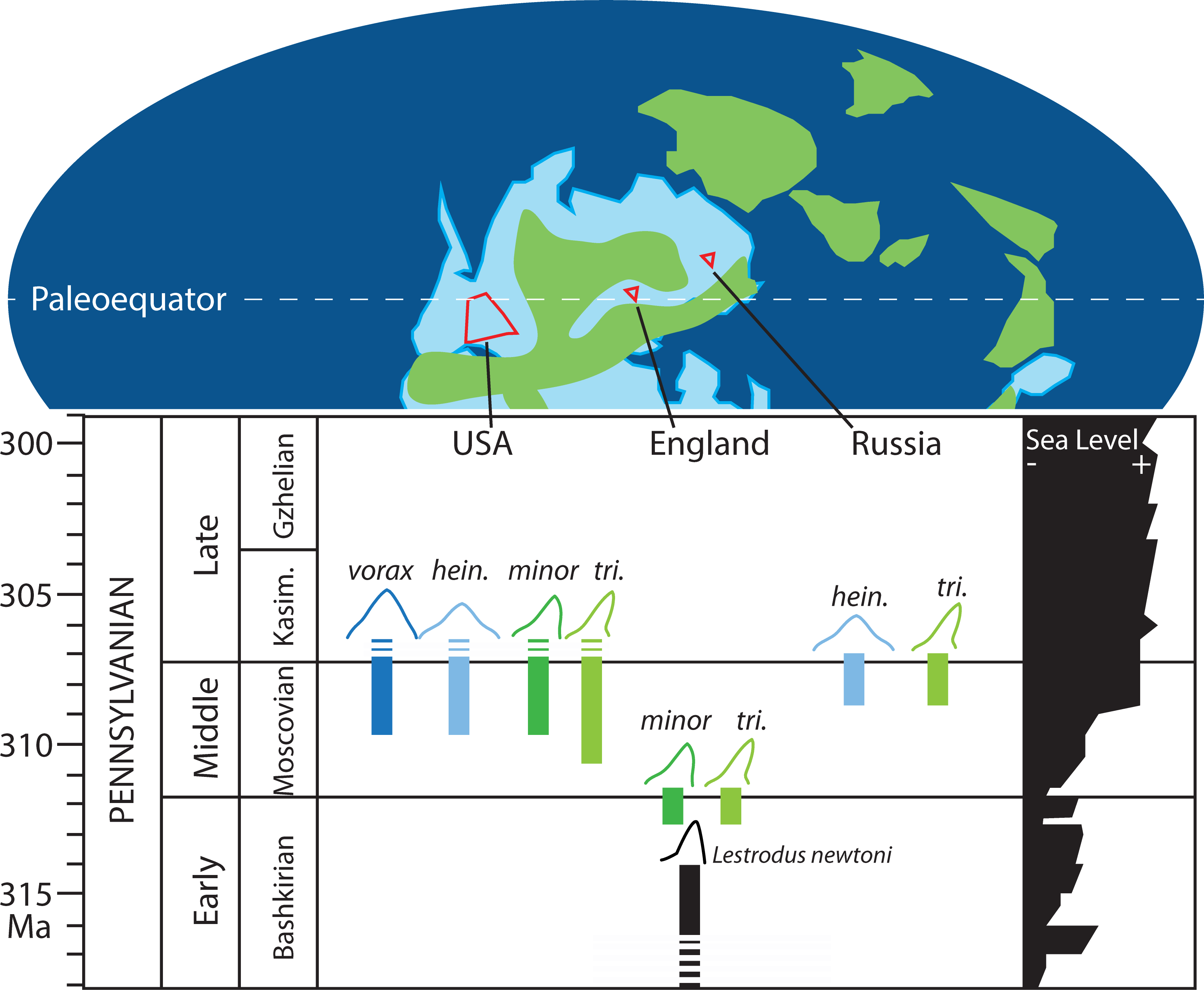
Chronology, paleogeography and teeth morphology of Edestus species

Fossil sites preserving Edestus remains were situated in paleoequatorial tropical latitudes. Most remains of Edestus are found in marine shales that overlie coal swamp deposits as a result of marine transgression events, but the genus is known from estuarine habitats as well.
