= Namurian =

Third stage of the Carboniferous

System	Series (NW Europe)	Stage (NW Europe)	Sub-system (ICS)	Stage (ICS)	Age (Ma)
Permian					younger
Carboniferous	Silesian	Stephanian	Pennsylvanian	Gzhelian	298.9–303.7
Carboniferous	Silesian	Stephanian	Pennsylvanian	Kasimovian	303.7–307.0
Carboniferous	Silesian	Westphalian	Pennsylvanian	Moscovian	307.0–315.2
Carboniferous	Silesian	Westphalian	Pennsylvanian	Bashkirian	315.2–323.4
Carboniferous	Silesian	Namurian	Pennsylvanian	Bashkirian	315.2–323.4
Carboniferous	Silesian	Namurian	Mississippian	Serpukhovian	323.4–330.3
Carboniferous	Dinantian	Visean	Mississippian	Visean	330.3–346.7
Carboniferous	Dinantian	Tournaisian	Mississippian	Tournaisian	346.7–358.9
Devonian					older
Subdivisions of the Carboniferous system in Europe compared with the official ICS-stages (as of 2024)

The Namurian is a stage in the regional stratigraphy of northwest Europe, with an age between roughly 331 and 319 Ma (million years ago). It is a subdivision of the Carboniferous system or period, as well as the regional Silesian series. The Namurian is named for the Belgian city and province of Namur where strata of this age occur (part of the Belgian Coal Measures). The Millstone Grit Group in the lithostratigraphy of northern England and parts of Wales is also of Namurian age.

The Namurian age lasted from 331 to 319 million years ago. It is preceded by the Visean stage/age (which corresponds to the upper Carboniferous Limestone of Great Britain) and succeeded by the Westphalian stage/age (which corresponds to the lower and middle Coal Measures of Great Britain).

In the official geologic timescale of the International Commission on Stratigraphy (ICS), the Namurian straddles the boundary between the Mississippian subperiod (359-323 Ma) and the Pennsylvanian subperiod (323-299 Ma). The upper part of the (regionally defined) Namurian stage corresponds to the (internationally used) Bashkirian stage whilst the lower part is assigned to the preceding Serpukhovian stage. Frequent references appear in scientific literature to a Namurian epoch or Namurian series, reflecting the stage's earlier status.

== Stratigraphy ==
Substages, from youngest to oldest:

- Yeadonian
- Marsdenian
- Kinderscoutian
- Alportian
- Chokierian
- Arnsbergian
- Pendleian

The boundary between the global Serpukhovian and Bashkirian stages (and thus the Mississippian and Pennsylvanian subperiods) occurs within the Chokierian substage.
