= Idiognathoides =

Idiognathoides Temporal range: Bashkirian–Moscovian

Scientific classification
- Kingdom: Animalia
- Phylum: Chordata
- Infraphylum: Agnatha
- Class: †Conodonta
- Order: †Ozarkodinida
- Family: †Idiognathodontidae
- Genus: †Idiognathoides; Harris and Hollingsworth, 1933

Species
- †Idiognathoides luokunensis; †Idiognathoides postsulcatus; †Idiognathoides sinuatus (syn. I. sinuata); †Idiognathoides sulcata

Extinct genus of jawless fishes

Idiognathoides is an extinct genus of conodonts.

Glen K. Merrill stated in 1963 that "conodont workers have considered Idiognathoides to be a junior synonym of Polygnathodella but it now proves to be a junior synonym of Cavusgnathus. Polygnathodella and Cavusgnathus are shown to form a transitional series."

== Use in stratigraphy ==
The Bashkirian, the oldest age of the Pennsylvanian (also known as Upper Carboniferous), contains six biozones based on conodont index fossils, one of which contains an Idiognathoides species : the zone of Idiognathoides sinuatus.

The base of the Moscovian, the second stage in the Pennsylvanian, is close to the first appearances of the conodonts Declinognathodus donetzianus and Idiognathoides postsulcatus. The GSSP candidate sections are the Ural Mountains or in Nashui, Luodian County, Guizhou, China.
