= Sofia Viktorovna Semikhatova =

Soviet and Russian geologist and paleontologist

Sofia Viktorovna Semikhatova (February 9, 1889 – October 28, 1973) was a Soviet geologist and paleontologist. She was a pioneer and developer in some of the most prominent petroleum-bearing regions of her country. Throughout a lengthy career in law studies and geological fields, Semikhatova published ninety works throughout Germany, England and the United States.

She analyzed animal life development in the base Middle Carboniferous period. She separated the Bashkirian Stage into horizons. Although Semikhatova never taught in higher educational establishments (as wife and mother of three), she sacrificed much of her time and effort towards preparing young scientists for their future endeavours in geology.

== Early life ==
She was born in St. Petersburg in 1889. Semikhatov began her education studying law in the highest course of the city. In 1913 she married Alexander Semikhatov and moved to Moscow, where she finished law school by correspondence. She resumed her education in the field of natural sciences at the Moscow Highest Women’s Courses. She married Alexander Nikolaevich Semikhatov. In 1918, she left the field when she gave birth to her first son, Mikhail Alexandrovich Semikhatov.

== Career ==
She pursued a career in the field of geology under the department of Y.V. Samoilov. In 1921 she gave birth to her daughter Olga Alexandrova Semikhatova and in 1924 she returned to work. In 1932 she gave birth to her second son Nikolai Alexandrovich Semikhatov. She left her full time career for a part time position, first at the Oil Institute and then at the Paleontological Institute. In 1942, Semikhatova and her family fled to Tashkent until 1944 when they were able to safely return to Moscow. She remained in Moscow at the All-Union Scientific Research Geological oil Institute as a researcher until her death in 1973.

=== Timeline ===
- Geological Committee, Research Scientist (1921-1930)
- Moscow Geological Institute, Senior Paleontologist (1930-1934)
- Oil Institute, Consultant (1934-1936)
- Paleontological Institute, Researcher (1936-1942)
- Uzbek Geological Administration, Researcher (1942-1944)
- Moscow Oil Institute, Gas development researcher (1946-1953)
- All Union Scientific Geological Oil Institute, Researcher (1953-1973)

== Works ==
=== Popular publications ===
- Stages in the development of brachiopods as one of the criteria for establishing stratigraphic boundaries in the Carboniferous

Semikhatova explores and defines the brachiopod fauna of the Carboniferous Period. Concluding overall a threefold division in the stages of the Carboniferous. Semikhatova also describes the basic stages of development of brachiopods as well as an in depth analysis of the stratigraphic and geographic characteristic distribution of the species.

- Stratigraphy of the Terrestrial Formation of the Lower Carboniferous of the Volga-Ural Area

The Lower Carboniferous is a rock unit that tells us the overall regularities of gas and oil deposits. Geologists differed as to what the age and differentiation of the terrestrial formations were. During research of the terrestrial formations, fauna was found in thin layers on top of the limestone. This data was crucial in finding out the age of the rocks; the rocks found at a depth of 2,841m however had insufficient faunal data, leaving them without an answer as to how old the rocks were.

- Upper and lower boundary of the middle Carboniferous Moscovian stage

The Moscovian Age is within the Pennsylvanian Subperiod, which is within the Carboniferous Period. Stage is the chronostratigraphic name of Age, which means the Moscovian Stage refers to a group of strata with the same age, while the Moscovian Age refers to the time period in the chronology of the Earth. Semikhatova discusses the boundaries of this stage, specifically in Moscow. Semikhatova discusses the connection between the Tagulifera Horizon and the Moscovian Stage,as well as the stratigraphic unit below the Moscovian Stage. Furthermore, Semikhatova discusses the fauna found above this Moscovian Stage and the pre-Upper Carboniferous earth movements that augmented the ground/sea bottom around the Volga River and the central part of the Russian platform.
