= Late Paleozoic icehouse =

Ice age

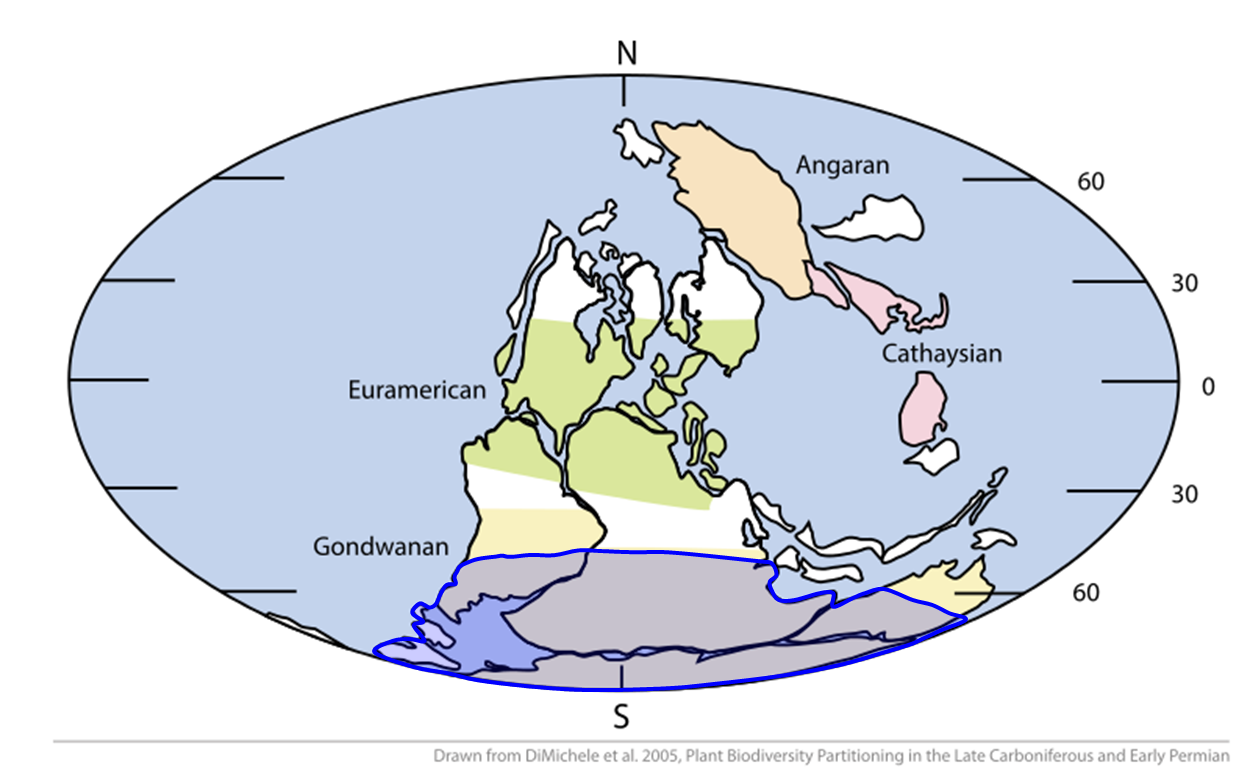
Approximate extent of the Late Paleozoic icehouse (in blue), over the Gondwana supercontinent during the Carboniferous and Permian periods

The Late Paleozoic Icehouse, also known as the Late Paleozoic Ice Age (LPIA) and formerly known as the Karoo Ice Age, was an ice age that began in the Late Devonian and ended in the Late Permian, occurring from around 360 to 255 million years ago, and large land-based ice sheets were then present on Earth's surface. It was the second major icehouse period of the Phanerozoic, after the Hirnantian glaciation.

== Timeline ==
Interpretations of the Late Paleozoic icehouse vary, with some researchers arguing it represented one continuous glacial event and others concluding that as many as 25 separate ice sheets across Gondwana developed, waxed, and waned independently and diachronously over the course of the Carboniferous and Permian, with the distribution of ice centres shifting as Gondwana drifted and its position relative to the South Pole changed. At the beginning of the Late Paleozoic icehouse, ice centres were concentrated in western South America; they later shifted eastward across Africa and by the end of the ice age were concentrated in Australia. Evidence from sedimentary basins suggests individual ice centres lasted for around 10 million years, with their peaks alternating with periods of low or absent permanent ice coverage.

The first glacial episodes of the Late Paleozoic icehouse occurred during the late Famennian and the Tournaisian, with δ^{15}N evidence showing that the transition from greenhouse to icehouse was a stepwise process and not an immediate change. These Early Mississippian glaciations were transient and minor, with them sometimes being considered discrete glaciations separate from and preceding the LPIA proper. Between 335 and 330 million years ago, or sometime between the middle Viséan and earliest Serpukhovian, the LPIA proper began. A start in glacioeustatic sea level changes is recorded from Idaho at around this time. The first major glacial period occurred from the Serpukhovian to the Moscovian: ice sheets expanded from a core in southern Africa and South America. During the Bashkirian, a global eustatic sea level drop occurred, signifying the first major glacial maximum of the Late Paleozoic icehouse. The Lhasa terrane became glaciated during this stage of the Carboniferous. A relatively warm interglacial interval spanning the Kasimovian and Gzhelian, coinciding with the Alykaevo Climatic Optimum, occurred between this first major glacial period and the later second major glacial period. The Paraná Basin nonetheless experienced its final glaciation during the early Gzhelian.

The second glacial period occurred from the late Gzhelian across the Carboniferous-Permian boundary to the early Sakmarian; ice sheets expanded from a core in Australia and India. This was the most intense interval of glaciation of the LPIA; in Australia, it is known as P1. An exceptionally intense cooling event occurred around 300 million years ago. From the late Sakmarian onward, and especially following the Artinskian Warming Event (AWE), these ice sheets declined, as indicated by a negative δ18O excursion. Ice sheets retreated southward across Central Africa and in the Karoo Basin. A regional glaciation spanning the latest Sakmarian and the Artinskian, known as P2, occurred in Australia amidst this global pulse of net warming and deglaciation. This massive deglaciation during the late Sakmarian and Artinskian is sometimes considered to be the end of the LPIA proper, with the Artinskian-Kungurian boundary and the associated Kungurian Carbon Isotopic Excursion used as the boundary demarcating the ice age's end. Nonetheless, ice caps of a much lower volume and area remained in Australia. Another long regional interval also limited to Australia from the middle Kungurian to the early Capitanian, known as P3, though unlike the previous glaciations, this one and the following P4 glaciation was largely limited to alpine glaciation. A final regional Australian interval lasted from the middle Capitanian to the late Wuchiapingian, known as P4. As with P3, P4's ice sheets were primarily high altitude glaciers. This glacial period was interrupted by a rapid warming interval corresponding to a surge in activity from the Emeishan Traps and corresponding Capitanian mass extinction event. The final alpine glaciers of the Late Paleozoic icehouse melted in what is now eastern Australia around 255 million years ago, during the late Wuchiapingian.

The time intervals here referred to as glacial and interglacial periods represented intervals of several million years corresponding to colder and warmer icehouse intervals, respectively, were influenced by long term variations in palaeogeography, greenhouse gas levels, and geological processes such as rates of volcanism and of silicate weathering and should not be confused with shorter term cycles of glacials and interglacials that are driven by astronomical forcing caused by Milankovitch cycles.

== Geologic effects ==
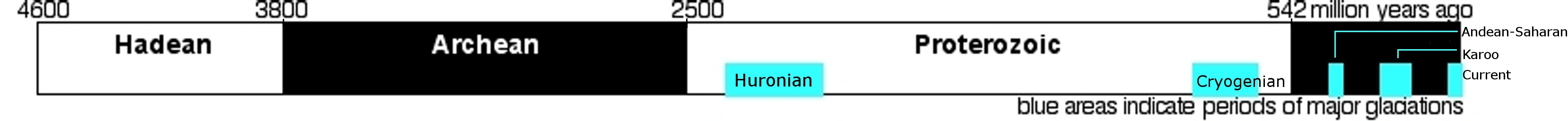
Timeline of glaciations (ice ages), shown in blue

According to Eyles and Young, "Renewed Late Devonian glaciation is well documented in three large intracratonic basins in Brazil (Solimoes, Amazonas and Paranaiba basins) and in Bolivia. By the Early Carboniferous (c. 350 Ma) glacial strata were beginning to accumulate in sub-Andean basins of Bolivia, Argentina and Paraguay. By the mid-Carboniferous glaciation had spread to Antarctica, Australia, southern Africa, the Indian Subcontinent, Asia and the Arabian Peninsula. During the Late Carboniferous glacial accumulation (c. 300 Ma) a very large area of Gondwana land mass was experiencing glacial conditions. The thickest glacial deposits of Permo-Carboniferous age are the Dwyka Formation (1000 m thick) in the Karoo Basin in southern Africa, the Itararé Group of the Paraná Basin, Brazil (1400 m) and the Carnarvon Basin in eastern Australia. The Permo-Carboniferous glaciations are significant because of the marked glacio-eustatic changes in sea level that resulted and which are recorded in non-glacial basins. Late Paleozoic glaciation of Gondwana could be explained by the migration of the supercontinent across the South Pole."

In northern Ethiopia, glacial landforms like striations, roches moutonnées, and chatter marks can be found buried beneath Late Carboniferous-Early Permian glacial deposits (Edaga Arbi Glacials). The Arabian Peninsula was situated at the northern edge of the Gondwanan ice sheet. Glaciofluvial sandstones, moraines, boulder beds, glacially striated pavements, and other glacially derived geologic structures and beds are also known throughout the southern part of the Arabian Peninsula.

In southern Victoria Land, Antarctica, the Metschel Tillite, made up of reworked Devonian Beacon Supergroup sedimentary strata along with Cambrian and Ordovician granitoids and some Neoproterozoic metamorphic rocks, preserves glacial sediments indicating the presence of major ice sheets. Northern Victoria Land and Tasmania hosted a distinct ice sheet from the one in southern Victoria Land that flowed west-northwestward.

The Sydney Basin of eastern Australia lay at a palaeolatitude of around 60°S to 70°S during the Early and Middle Permian, and its sedimentary successions preserve at least four phases of glaciation throughout this time.

Debate exists as to whether the Northern Hemisphere experienced glaciation like the Southern Hemisphere did, with most palaeoclimate models suggesting that ice sheets did exist in Northern Pangaea but that they were very negligible in volume. Diamictites from the Atkan Formation of Magadan Oblast, Russia have been interpreted as being glacigenic, although recent analyses have challenged this interpretation, suggesting that these diamictites formed during a Capitanian integrlacial interval as a result of volcanogenic debris flows associated with the formation of the Okhotsk–Taigonos Volcanic Arc.

The tropics experienced a cyclicity between wetter and drier periods that may have been related to changes between cold glacials and warm interglacials. In the Midland Basin of Texas, increased aeolian sedimentation reflective of heightened aridity occurred during warmer intervals, as it did in the Paradox Basin of Utah.

== Causes ==
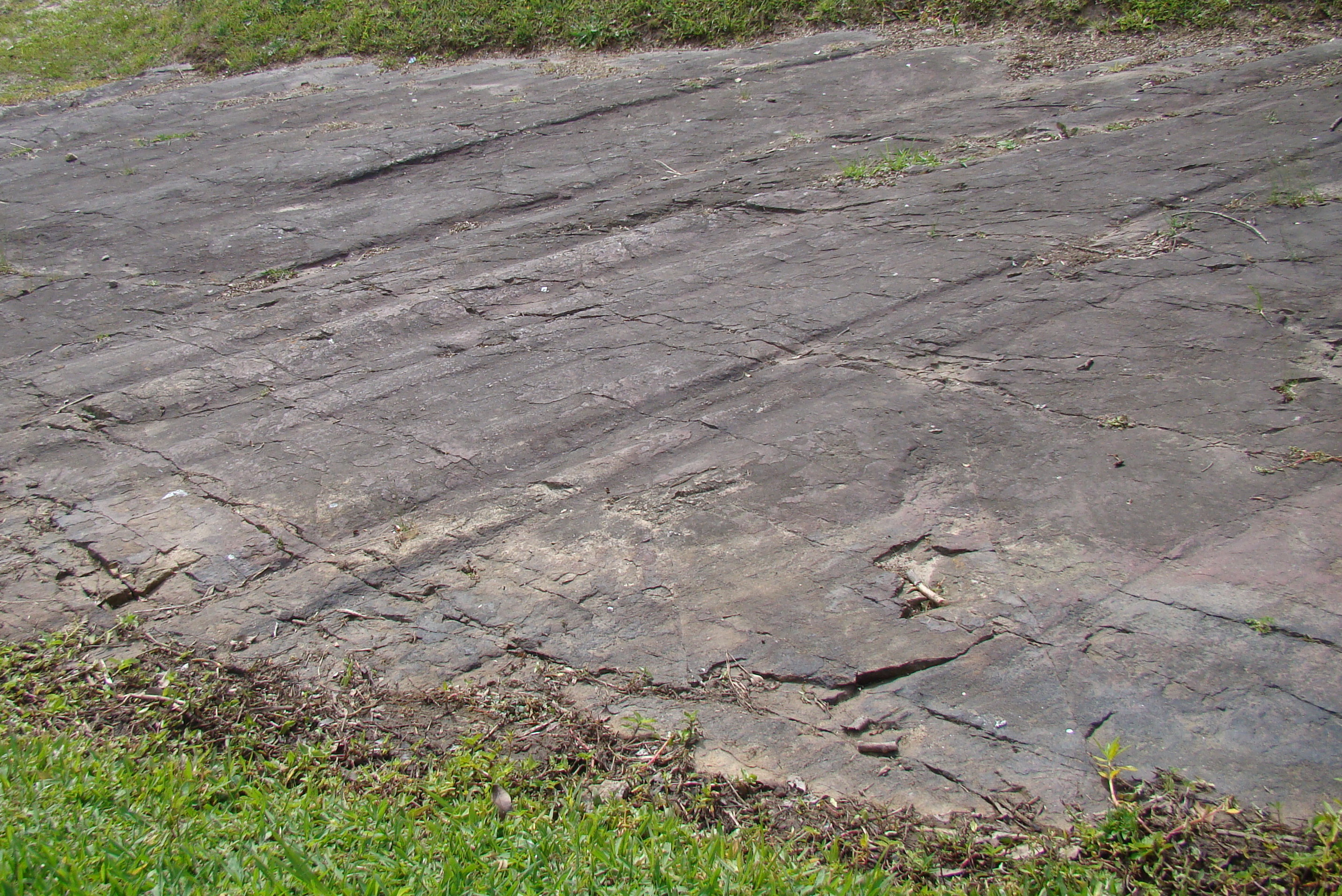
Glacial striations formed by late Paleozoic glaciers in the Witmarsum Colony, Paraná Basin, Paraná, Brazil

=== Greenhouse gas reduction ===
The evolution of plants following the Silurian-Devonian Terrestrial Revolution and the subsequent adaptive radiation of vascular plants on land began a long-term increase in planetary oxygen levels. Large tree ferns, growing to 20 m (66 ft) high, were secondarily dominant to the large arborescent lycopods (30–40 m high) of the Carboniferous coal forests that flourished in equatorial swamps stretching from Appalachia to Poland, and later on the flanks of the Urals. The enhanced carbon sequestration raised the atmospheric oxygen levels to a peak of 35%, and lowered carbon dioxide level below the 300 parts per million (ppm), possibly as low as 180 ppm during the Kasimovian, which is today associated with glacial periods. This reduction in the greenhouse effect was coupled with burial of organic carbon as charcoal or coal, with lignin and cellulose (as tree trunks and other vegetation debris) accumulating and being buried in the great Carboniferous coal measures. The reduction of carbon dioxide levels in the atmosphere would be enough to begin the process of changing polar climates, leading to cooler summers which could not melt the previous winter's snow accumulations. The growth in snowfields to 6 m deep would create sufficient pressure to convert the lower levels to ice. Research indicates that changing carbon dioxide concentrations were the dominant driver of changes between colder and warmer intervals during the Early and Middle Permian portions of the LPIA.

The tectonic assembly of the continents of Euramerica and Gondwana into Pangaea, in the Hercynian-Alleghany Orogeny, made a major continental land mass within the Antarctic region and an increase in carbon sequestration via silicate weathering, which led to progressive cooling of summers, and the snowfields accumulating in winters, which caused mountainous alpine glaciers to grow, and then spread out of highland areas. That made continental glaciers, which spread to cover much of Gondwana. Modelling evidence points to tectonically induced carbon dioxide removal via silicate weathering to have been sufficient to generate the ice age. The closure of the Rheic Ocean and Iapetus Ocean saw disruption of warm-water currents in the Panthalassa Ocean and Paleotethys Sea, which may have also been a factor in the development of the LPIA.

The capture of carbon dioxide through weathering of large igneous provinces emplaced during the Kungurian brought about the P3 glaciation.

=== Topographic changes ===
The Mississippian witnessed major uplift in southwestern Gondwana, where the earliest glaciations of the LPIA began. The uplift, driven by mantle dynamics rather than by crustal tectonic processes, is evidenced by the increase in temperature of the southwestern Gondwanan crust as shown by changing compositions of granites formed at this time.

=== Milankovitch cycles ===
The LPIA, like the present Quaternary glaciation, saw glacial-interglacial cycles governed by Milankovitch cycles acting on timescales of tens of thousands to millions of years. Periods of low obliquity, which decreased annual insolation at the poles, were associated with high moisture flux from low latitudes and glacial expansion at high latitudes, while periods of high obliquity corresponded to warmer, interglacial periods. Data from Serpukhovian and Moscovian marine strata of South China point to glacioeustasy being driven primarily by long-period eccentricity, with a cyclicity of around 405,000 years, and the modulation of the amplitude of Earth's obliquity, with a cyclicity of around 1.2 million years. This is most similar to the early part of the Late Cenozoic Ice Age, from the Oligocene to the Pliocene, before the formation of the Arctic ice cap, suggesting the climate of this episode of time was relatively warm for an icehouse period. Evidence from the Middle Permian Lucaogou Formation of Xinjiang, China indicates that the climate of the time was particularly sensitive to the 1.2 million year long-period modulation cycle of obliquity. It also suggests that palaeolakes such as those found in the Junggar Basin likely played an important role as a carbon sink during the later stages of the LPIA, with their absorption and release of carbon dioxide acting as powerful feedback loops during Milankovitch cycle driven glacial and interglacial transitions. Also during this time, unique sedimentary sequences called cyclothems were deposited. These were produced by the repeated alterations of marine and nonmarine environments resulting from glacioeustatic rises and falls of sea levels linked to Milankovitch cycles.

== Biotic effects ==
The development of high-frequency, high-amplitude glacioeustasy, which resulted in sea level changes of up to 120 metres between warmer and colder intervals, during the beginning of the LPIA, combined with the increased geographic separation of marine ecoregions and decrease in ocean circulation it caused in conjunction with closure of the Rheic Ocean, has been hypothesised to have been the cause of the Carboniferous-Earliest Permian Biodiversification Event. Milankovitch cycles profound impacts on marine life at the height of the LPIA, with high-latitude species being more strongly affected by glacial-interglacial cycles than low-latitude species.

At the beginning of the LPIA, the transition from a greenhouse to an icehouse climate, in conjunction with increases in atmospheric oxygen concentrations, reduced thermal stratification and increased the vertical extent of the mixed layer, which promoted higher rates of microbial nitrification as revealed by an increase in δ^{15}N_{bulk} values.

The rising levels of oxygen during the late Paleozoic icehouse had major effects upon evolution of plants and animals. Higher oxygen concentration (and accompanying higher atmospheric pressure) enabled energetic metabolic processes which encouraged evolution of large land-dwelling arthropods and flight, with the dragonfly-like Meganeura, an aerial predator, with a wingspan of 60 to 75 cm. The herbivorous stocky-bodied and armoured millipede-like Arthropleura was 1.8 metres (5.9 ft) long, and the semiterrestrial Hibbertopterid eurypterids were perhaps as large, and some scorpions reached 50 or 70 centimetres (20 or 28 in).

== Termination ==
Earth's increased planetary albedo produced by the expanding ice sheets would lead to positive feedback loops, spreading the ice sheets still further, until the process hit a limit. Falling global temperatures would eventually limit plant growth, and the rising levels of oxygen would increase the frequency of fire-storms because damp plant matter could burn. Both these effects return carbon dioxide to the atmosphere, reversing the "snowball" effect and forcing the greenhouse effect, with carbon dioxide levels rising to 300 ppm in the following Permian period. From a record low 298 million years ago, the CO2-level in the atmosphere rose abruptly to 4-fold 294 million years ago.

Once these factors brought a halt and a small reversal in the spread of ice sheets, the lower planetary albedo resulting from the fall in size of the glaciated areas would have been enough for warmer summers and winters and thus limit the depth of snowfields in areas from which the glaciers expanded. Rising sea levels produced by global warming drowned the large areas of flatland where previously anoxic swamps assisted in burial and removal of carbon (as coal). With a smaller area for deposition of carbon, more carbon dioxide was returned to the atmosphere, further warming the planet. Over the course of the Early and Middle Permian, glacial periods became progressively shorter while warm interglacials became longer, gradually transitioning the world from an icehouse to a greenhouse as the Permian progressed. Obliquity nodes that triggered glacial expansion and increased tropical precipitation before 285.1 million years ago became linked to intervals of marine anoxia and increased terrestrial aridification after this point, a turning point signifying the icehouse-greenhouse transition. Increased lacustrine methane emissions acted as a positive feedback enhancing warming. The Late Paleozoic icehouse finally ended around 255 million years ago.

== See also ==
- History of Earth
- Quaternary glaciation – the current ice age
- Timeline of glaciation
