= LPIA =

LPIA most often refers to

- Late Paleozoic Ice Age
- Lynden Pindling International Airport, Nassau, Bahamas
- Low-Power Intel Atom
