= Serpukhovian =

Third stage of the Carboniferous

- 330.3 ± 0.4 – 323.4 ± 0.4 Ma
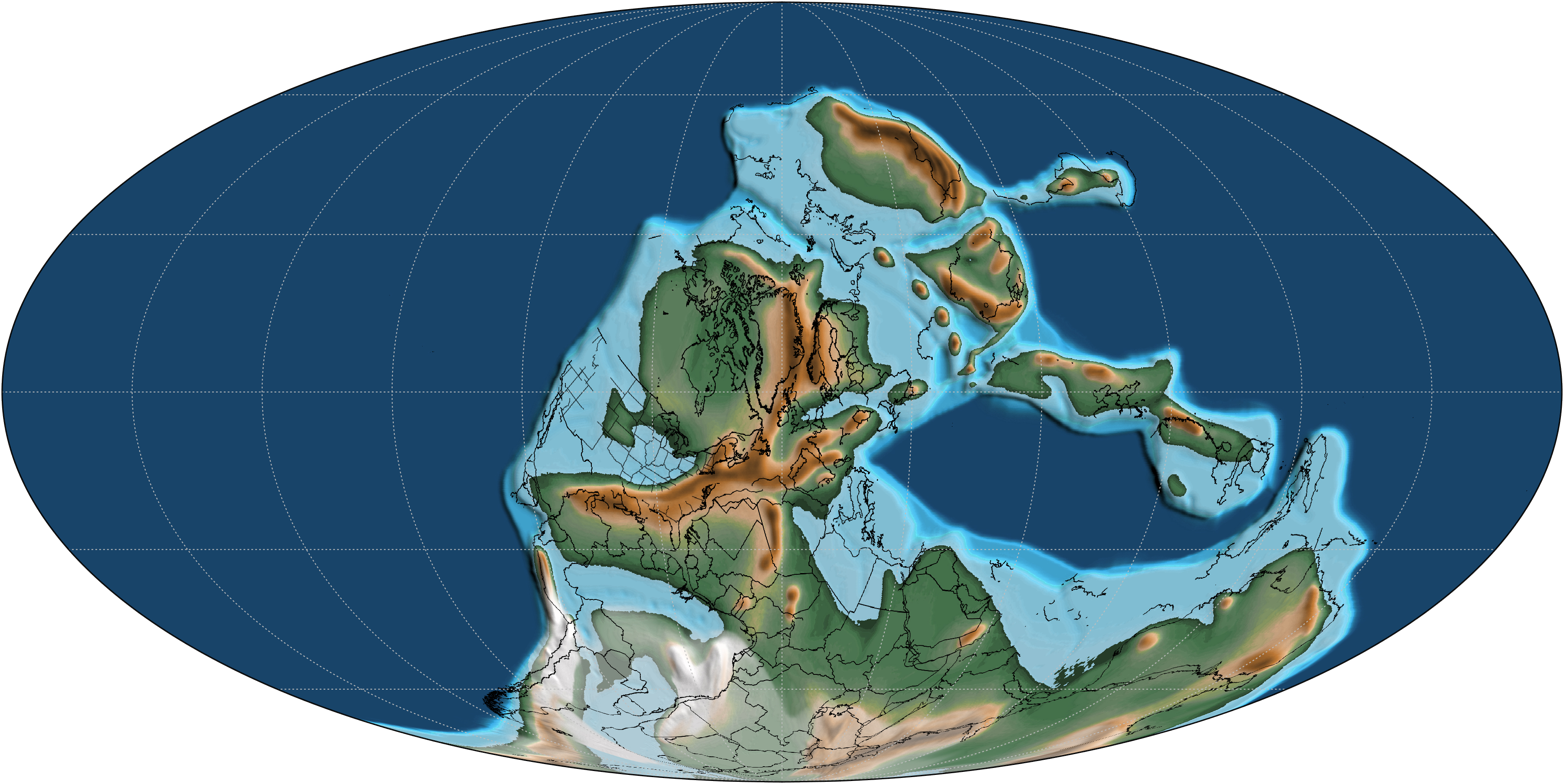
- Paleogeography of the Serpukhovian, 330 Ma

Chronology
← / Carboniferous Rainforest Collapse; ← / Mazon Creek Fossils; ← / End of Romer's Gap; ← / Beginning of Romer's Gap
Subdivision of the Carboniferous according to the ICS, as of 2024. Vertical axis scale: Millions of years ago

Etymology
- Name formality: Formal

Usage information
- Celestial body: Earth
- Regional usage: Global (ICS)
- Time scale(s) used: ICS Time Scale

Definition
- Chronological unit: Age
- Stratigraphic unit: Stage
- Time span formality: Formal
- Lower boundary definition: Not formally defined
- Lower boundary definition candidates: FAD of the conodont Lochriea ziegleri
- Lower boundary GSSP candidate section(s): Verkhnyaya Kardailovka, Ural Mountains; Nashui, Luodian County, Guizhou, China
- Upper boundary definition: FAD of the conodont Declinognathodus nodiliferus
- Upper boundary GSSP: Arrow Canyon, Nevada, USA; 36.7333°N 114.7778°W
- Upper GSSP ratified: 1996

The Serpukhovian is in the ICS geologic timescale the uppermost stage or youngest age of the Mississippian, the lower subsystem of the Carboniferous. The Serpukhovian age lasted from 330.3 Ma to 323.4 Ma. It is preceded by the Visean and is followed by the Bashkirian. The Serpukhovian correlates with the lower part of the Namurian Stage of European stratigraphy and the middle and upper parts of the Chesterian Stage of North American stratigraphy.

== Name and definition ==
The Serpukhovian Stage was proposed in 1890 by Russian stratigrapher Sergei Nikitin and was introduced in the official stratigraphy of European Russia in 1974. It was named after the city of Serpukhov, near Moscow. The ICS later used the upper Russian subdivisions of the Carboniferous in its international geologic time scale.

The base of the Serpukhovian is informally defined by the first appearance of the conodont Lochriea ziegleri, though the utility and systematic stability of this species is not yet certain. No lower GSSP has been assigned to the Serpukhovian Stage yet. Two candidate GSSPs have been proposed: the Verkhnyaya Kardailovka section in the South Urals of Russia, and the Naqing (Nashui) section in Guizhou, China.

The top of the stage (the base of the Pennsylvanian subsystem and Bashkirian stage) is at the first appearance of the conodont Declinognathodus nodiliferus in the lower Bird Spring Formation, which overlies the Battleship Formation in Nevada. It is also slightly above the first appearance of the foram Globivalvulina bulloides, genozone of the ammonoid genus Homoceras and the ammonoid biozone of Isohomoceras subglobosum.

== Subdivision ==
=== Biostratigraphy ===
In Europe, the Serpukhovian Stage includes three conodont biozones: the Gnathodus postbilineatus Zone (youngest), Gnathodus bollandensis Zone, and Lochriea ziegleri Zone (in part, oldest). There are three foraminifera biozones: the Monotaxinoides transitorius Zone (youngest), Eostaffellina protvae Zone, and Neoarchaediscus postrugosus Zone (oldest).

In North America, the stage encompassed four conodont biozones: the Rhachistognathus muricatus Zone (youngest), Adetognathus unicornis Zone, Cavusgnathus naviculus Zone, and Gnathodus bilineatus Zone (in part, oldest).

=== Regional subdivisions ===
In the regional stratigraphy of Russia (and Eastern Europe as a whole), the Serpukhovian is subdivided into four substages, from oldest to youngest: the Tarusian, Steshevian, Protvian, and Zapaltyubian. The former three are found in the Moscow Basin and are named after places near Serpukhov (Tarusa and Protva). Strata belonging to the Zapaltyubian are not exposed in the Moscow Basin, though they are found in the Donets Basin and the Urals.

In the regional stratigraphy of the United Kingdom (and Western Europe as a whole), the Serpukhovian corresponds to the lower half of the Namurian regional stage. This portion of the Namurian includes three substages, from oldest to youngest: the Pendleian, Arnsbergian and Chokierian. Only the lowermost Chokierian falls in the Serpukhovian, the upper part of the substage corresponds to the earliest Bashkirian.

In North America, the Serpukhovian corresponds to the upper part of the Chesterian regional stage, while in China the Serpukhovian is roughly equivalent to the Dewuan regional stage.

== Serpukhovian extinction ==
The largest extinction event of the Carboniferous Period occurred in the early Serpukhovian. This extinction came in the form of ecological turnovers, with the demise of diverse Mississippian assemblages of crinoids and rugose corals. After the extinction, they were replaced by species-poor cosmopolitan ecosystems. The extinction selectively targeted species with a narrow range of temperature preferences, as cooling seawater led to habitat loss for tropical specialists. Ammonoids appear to have not been impacted by this event, as they reached a zenith in diversity at this time. The long-term ecological impact of the Serpukhovian extinction may have exceeded that of the Ordovician-Silurian extinction, where taxonomic diversity was abruptly devastated but quickly recovered to pre-extinction levels.

Sepkoski (1996) plotted an extinction rate of around 23-24% for the Serpukhovian as a whole, based on marine genera which persist through multiple stages. Bambach (2006) found an early Serpukhovian extinction rate of 31% among all marine genera. Using an extinction probability procedure generated from the Paleobiology Database, McGhee et al. (2013) estimated an extinction rate as high as 39% for marine genera. On the other hand, Stanley (2016) estimated that the extinction was much smaller, at a loss of only 13-14 % of marine genera.

Relative to other biological crises, the Serpukhovian extinction was much more selective in its effects on different evolutionary faunas. Stanley (2007) estimated that the early Serpukhovian saw the loss of 37.5% of marine genera in the Paleozoic evolutionary fauna. Only 15.4% of marine genera in the modern evolutionary fauna would have been lost along the same time interval. This disconnect, and the severity of the extinction as a whole, is reminiscent of the Late Devonian extinction events. Another similarity is how the Serpukhovian extinction was seemingly driven by low rates of speciation, rather than particularly high rates of extinction.

It is disputed whether the aftermath of the extinction saw a relative stagnation of biodiversity or a major increase. Some studies have found that in the following Late Paleozoic Ice Age (LPIA) of the Late Carboniferous and Early Permian, both speciation and extinction rates were low, with this stagnation in biological diversity driven by a reduction of carbonate platforms, which otherwise would have helped to maintain high biodiversity. More recent studies have instead argued that biodiversity surged during the LPIA in what is known as the Carboniferous-Earliest Permian Biodiversification Event (CPBE). Foraminifera especially saw extremely rapid diversification. The CPBE may have been caused by the dramatically increased marine provincialism resulting from sea level fall during the LPIA, combined with the assembly of Pangaea, which limited the spread of taxa from one region of the world ocean to another.

Brachiopod species composition does change at the Serpukhovian-Bashkirian boundary GSSP at Arrow Canyon, Nevada, but this appears to result from local shifts in habitat (according to shifting sediment facies), as opposed to true extinctions. The apparent Serpukhovian extinction may be weaker than assumed, at least in regions equivalent to modern North America.

== See also ==
- Fossil Grove
