= Lochriea =

Lochriea Temporal range: Visean–Serpukhovian

Scientific classification
- Kingdom: Animalia
- Phylum: Chordata
- Infraphylum: Agnatha
- Class: †Conodonta
- Order: †Ozarkodinida
- Superfamily: †Polygnathacea
- Genus: †Lochriea; Scott, 1942

Species
- †Lochriea costata; †Lochriea commutata (P1 type element); †Lochriea cruciformis; †Lochriea monocostata; †Lochriea montanaensis (M type element); †Lochriea monocarinata; †Lochriea mononodosa; †Lochriea multinodosa; †Lochriea nodosa; †Lochriea saharae; †Lochriea scotiaensis; †Lochriea senkenbergica; †Lochriea ziegleri

Extinct genus of jawless fishes

Lochriea is an extinct genus of conodonts.

== Use in stratigraphy ==
The Visean, the second age of the Mississippian, contains four conodont biozones, two of which are named after Lochriea species:

- the zone of Lochriea nodosa
- the zone of Gnathodus bilineatus
- the zone of Lochriea commutata
- the zone of Pseudognathodus homopunctatus

The Serpukhovian, the third or youngest age of the Mississippian, includes three conodont biozones, one of which is named after Lochriea species:

- the zone of Gnathodus postbilineatus
- the zone of Gnathodus bollandensis
- the zone of Lochriea ziegleri
