= Polygnathodella =

Polygnathodella Temporal range: Pennsylvanian

Scientific classification
- Kingdom: Animalia
- Phylum: Chordata
- Class: †Conodonta
- Genus: †Polygnathodella Harlton, 1933

Species
- †Polygnathodella ouachitensis

Extinct genus of jawless fishes

Polygnathodella is an extinct genus of conodont.

Glen K. Merrill stated in 1963 that "conodont workers have considered Idiognathoides to be a junior synonym of Polygnathodella but it now proves to be a junior synonym of Cavusgnathus. Polygnathodella and Cavusgnathus are shown to form a transitional series."
