= Pennsylvanian (geology) =

Second subperiod of the Carboniferous

- 323.4 ± 0.4 – 298.9 ± 0.15 Ma
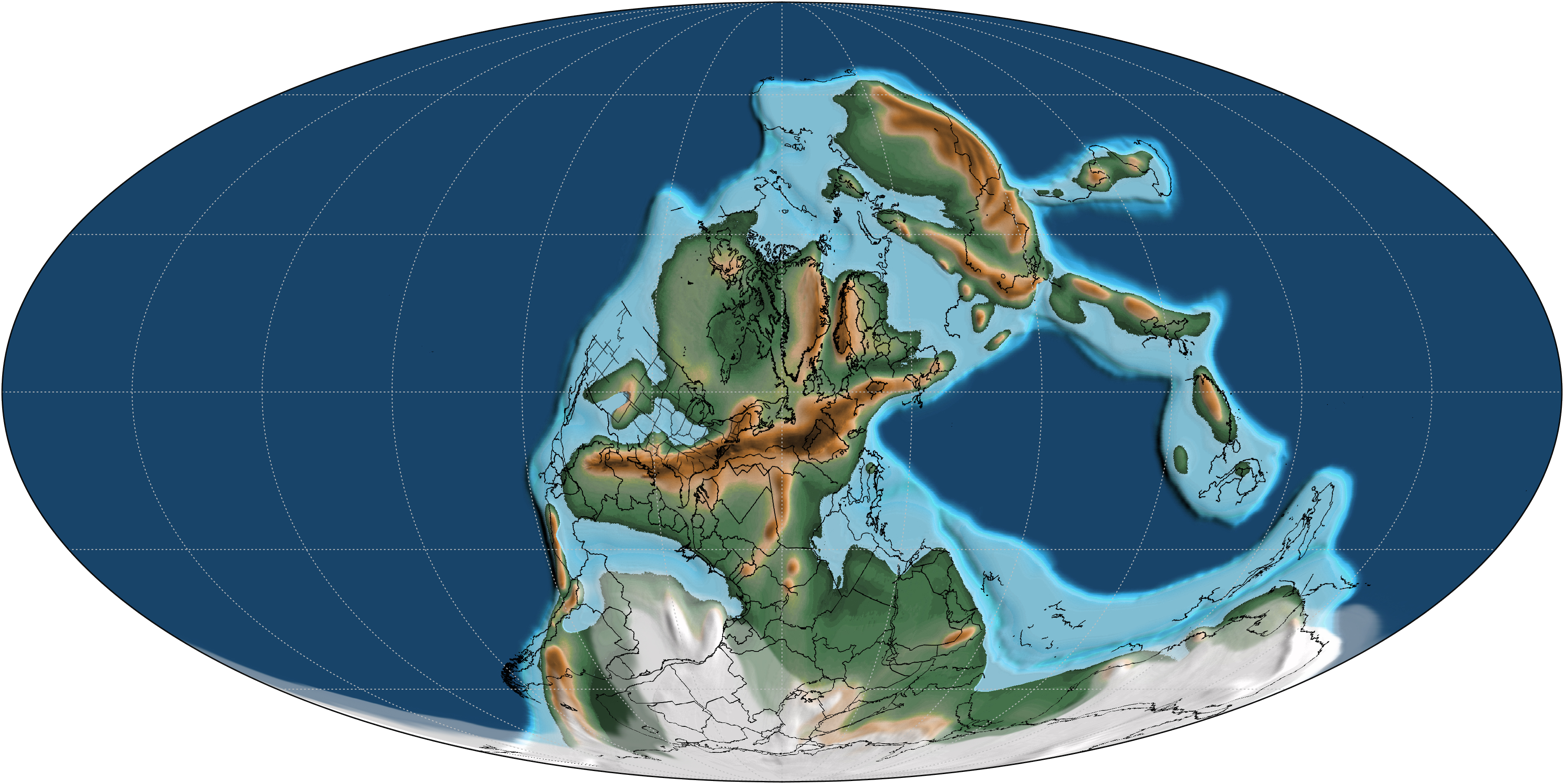
- A map of Earth as it appeared 310 million years ago during the Pennsylvanian Subperiod, Moscovian Age

Chronology
| ← / Carboniferous Rainforest Collapse; ← / Mazon Creek Fossils; ← / End of Romer's Gap; ← / Beginning of Romer's Gap |
Subdivision of the Carboniferous according to the ICS, as of 2024. Vertical axis scale: Millions of years ago

Etymology
- Name formality: Formal

Usage information
- Celestial body: Earth
- Regional usage: Global (ICS)
- Time scale(s) used: ICS Time Scale

Definition
- Chronological unit: Subperiod
- Time span formality: Formal
- Lower boundary definition: First appearance of the Conodont Declinognathodus nodiliferus.
- Lower boundary GSSP: Arrow Canyon, Nevada, United States; 36.7333°N 114.7778°W
- Lower GSSP ratified: 1996
- Upper boundary definition: First appearance of the Conodont Streptognathodus isolatus within the morphotype Streptognathodus wabaunsensis chronocline.
- Upper boundary GSSP: Aidaralash, Ural Mountains, Kazakhstan; 50.2458°N 57.8914°E
- Upper GSSP ratified: 1996

The Pennsylvanian (/ˌpɛnsəlˈveɪni.ən/ pen-səl-VAYN-i-ən, also known as Upper Carboniferous or Late Carboniferous) is, on the ICS geologic timescale, the younger of two subperiods of the Carboniferous Period (or the upper of two subsystems of the Carboniferous System). It lasted from roughly 323.4 million years ago to 298.9 million years ago. As with most other geochronologic units, the rock beds that define the Pennsylvanian are well identified, but the exact date of the start and end are uncertain by a few hundred thousand years. The Pennsylvanian is named after the U.S. state of Pennsylvania, where the coal beds of this age are widespread.

The division between Pennsylvanian and Mississippian comes from North American stratigraphy. In North America, where the early Carboniferous beds are primarily marine limestones, the Pennsylvanian was in the past treated as a full-fledged geologic period between the Mississippian and the Permian. In parts of Europe, the Mississippian and Pennsylvanian are one more-or-less continuous sequence of lowland continental deposits and are grouped together as the Carboniferous Period. The current internationally used geologic timescale of the ICS gives the Mississippian and Pennsylvanian the rank of subperiods, subdivisions of the Carboniferous Period.

== Life ==
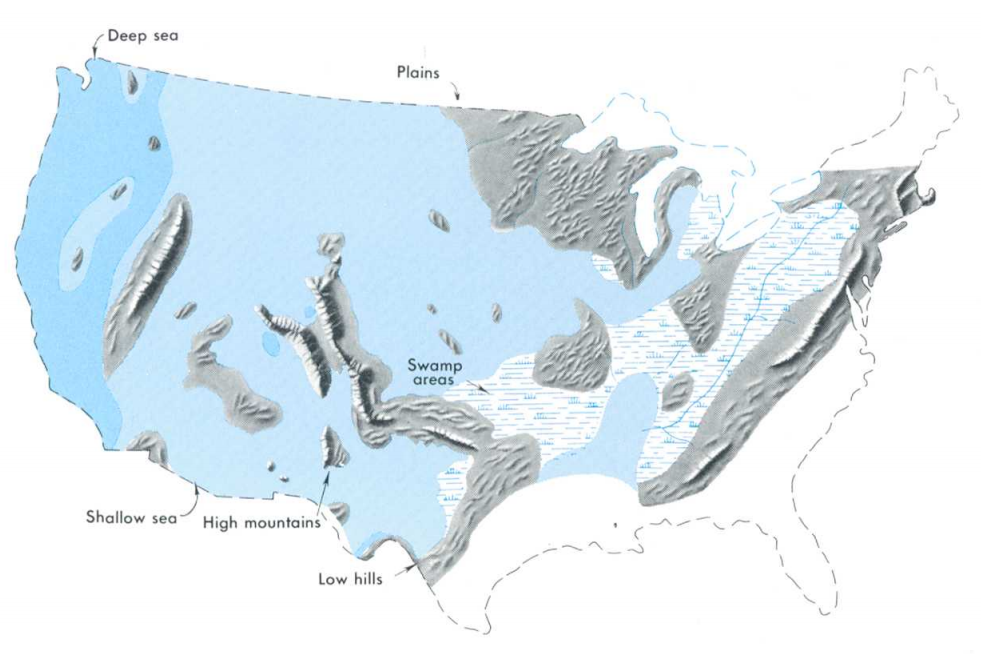
Generalized geographic map of the United States in middle Pennsylvanian time

=== Fungi ===
All modern classes of fungi have been found in rocks of Pennsylvanian age.

=== Invertebrates ===
The major forms of life at this time were the arthropods. Arthropods were far larger than modern ones. Arthropleura, a giant millipede, was a common sight and the giant griffinfly Meganeura "flew the skies". It is commonly considered that is because of high oxygen level, however some of those large arthropod records are also known from period with relatively low oxygen, which suggest high oxygen pressure may not have been a primary reason for their gigantism.

=== Vertebrates ===
Amphibians were diverse and common; some were several meters long as adults. The collapse of the rainforest ecology in the mid-Pennsylvanian (however, prospered due to specific key adaptations. One of the greatest evolutionary innovations of the Carboniferous was the amniote egg, which allowed for the further exploitation of the land by certain tetrapods. These included the earliest sauropsid reptiles (Hylonomus), and the earliest known "pelycosaur" synapsids (Archaeothyris). Small lizard-like animals quickly gave rise to many descendants. Amniotes underwent a major evolutionary radiation, in response to the drier climate that followed the rainforest collapse.

For some reason, pelycosaurs were able to reach larger sizes before reptiles could, and this trend continued until the end of the Permian, during which their cynodont descendants became smaller and nocturnal, as the reptilian archosaurs took over, although dicynodonts would remain megafaunal until their extinction at the end of the Triassic. Most pre-rainforest collapse tetrapods remained smaller, probably due to the land being primarily occupied by the gigantic millipedes, scorpions, and flying insects. After the rainforest collapse, the giant arthropods disappeared, allowing amniote tetrapods to achieve larger sizes.

== Subdivisions ==
The Pennsylvanian has been variously subdivided. The international timescale of the ICS follows the Russian subdivision into four stages:

- Bashkirian (oldest)
- Moscovian
- Kasimovian
- Gzhelian (youngest)

North American subdivision is into five stages, but not precisely the same, with additional (older) Appalachian series names following:

- Morrowan stage, corresponding with the middle and lower part of the Pottsville Group (oldest)
- Atokan stage, corresponding with the upper part of the Pottsville group
- Desmoinesian stage, corresponding with the Allegheny Group
- Missourian stage, corresponding with the Conemaugh Group
- Virgilian stage, corresponding with the Monongahela Group (youngest)

The Virgilian or Conemaugh corresponds to the Gzhelian plus the uppermost Kasimovian. The Missourian or Monongahela corresponds to the rest of the Kasimovian. The Desmoinesian or Allegheny corresponds to the upper half of the Moscovian. The Atokan or upper Pottsville corresponds to the lower half of the Moscovian. The Morrowan corresponds to the Bashkirian.

In the European subdivision, the Carboniferous is divided into two epochs: Dinantian (early) and Silesian (late). The Silesian starts earlier than the Pennsylvanian and is divided in three ages:

- Namurian (corresponding to Serpukhovian and early Bashkirian)
- Westphalian (corresponding to late Bashkirian, Moskovian and Kasimovian)
- Stephanian (corresponding to Gzhelian).
