= Declinognathodus =

Declinognathodus Temporal range: Bashkirian–Moscovian

Scientific classification
- Kingdom: Animalia
- Phylum: Chordata
- Class: †Conodonta
- Genus: †Declinognathodus Dunn, 1966

Species
- †Declinognathodus bernesgae; †Declinognathodus donetzianus; †Declinognathodus inaequalis; †Declinognathodus intermedius; †Declinognathodus lateralis; †Declinognathodus marginodosus; †Declinognathodus japonicus; †Declinognathodus noduliferus (type); †Declinognathodus praenoduliferus; †Declinognathodus pseudolateralis; †Declinognathodus tuberculosus

Extinct genus of jawless fishes

Declinognathodus is an extinct genus of platform conodonts.

== Use in stratigraphy ==
The Bashkirian, the oldest age of the Pennsylvanian (also known as Upper Carboniferous), contains six biozones based on conodont index fossils, two of which are named after Declinognathodus species:

- the zone of Declinognathodus marginodosus,
- the zone of Declinognathodus noduliferus.

The GSSP point is at Arrow Canyon, Nevada, USA, with the first appearance of Declinognathodus noduliferus sensu lato.

The base of the Moscovian, the second stage in the Pennsylvanian, is close to the first appearances of the conodonts Declinognathodus donetzianus Nemirovskaya, 1990 and Diplognathodus ellesmerensis Bender, 1980. The Moscovian can biostratigraphically be divided into five conodont biozones, one of which is named after a Declinognathodus species : the zone of Declinognathodus donetzianus. The GSSP candidate sections are the Ural Mountains or in Naqing (Nashui), Luodian County, Guizhou, China.
