= Viséan =

Second stage of the Carboniferous

- 346.7 ± 0.4 – 330.3 ± 0.4 Ma
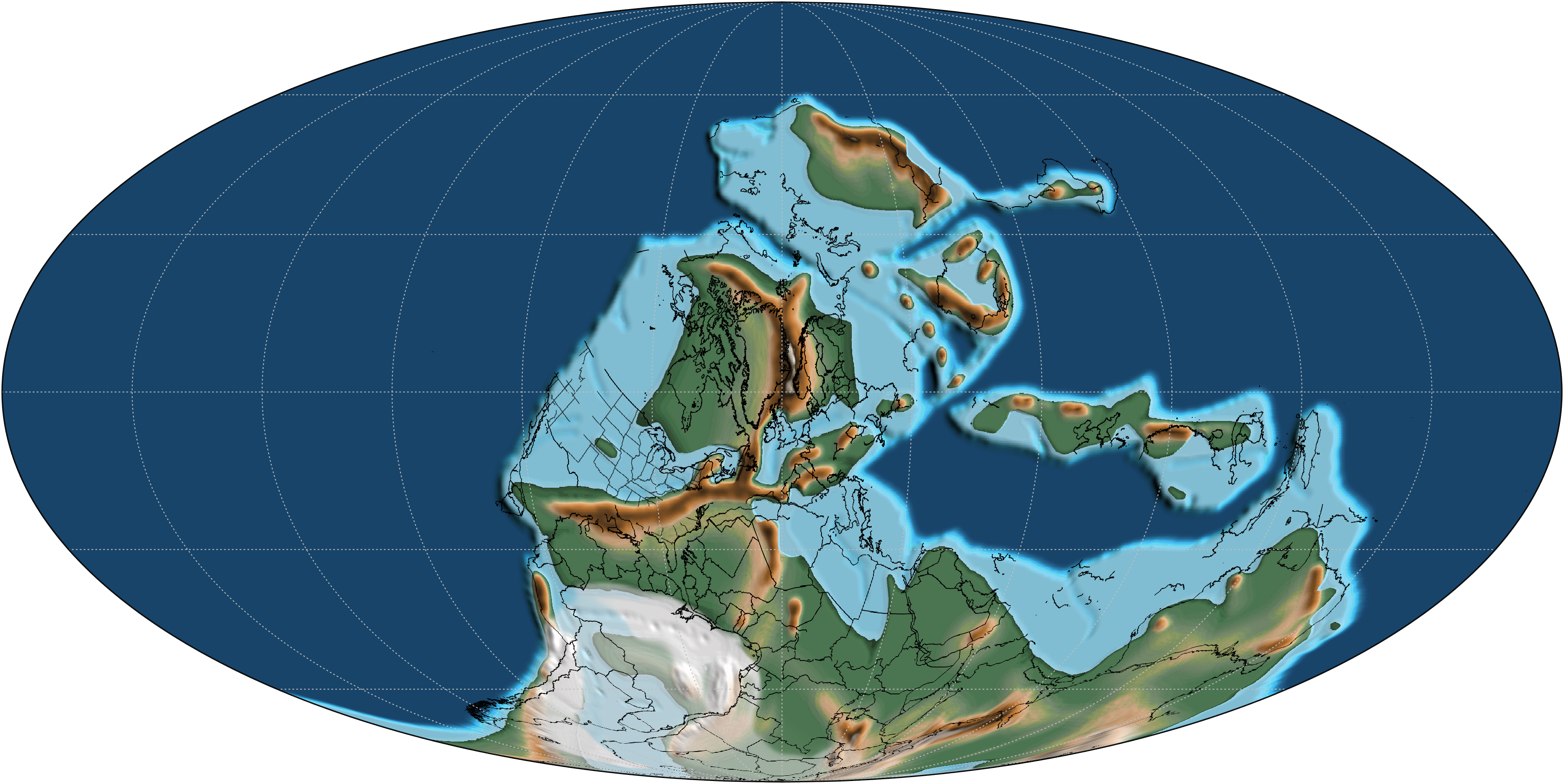
- Paleogeography of the Viséan, 340 Ma

Chronology
← / Carboniferous Rainforest Collapse; ← / Mazon Creek Fossils; ← / End of Romer's Gap; ← / Beginning of Romer's Gap
Subdivision of the Carboniferous according to the ICS, as of 2024. Vertical axis scale: Millions of years ago

Etymology
- Name formality: Formal
- Alternate spelling(s): Visean, Visian

Usage information
- Celestial body: Earth
- Regional usage: Global (ICS)
- Time scale(s) used: ICS Time Scale

Definition
- Chronological unit: Age
- Stratigraphic unit: Stage
- Time span formality: Formal
- Lower boundary definition: FAD of the benthic foraminifer Eoparastaffella simplex
- Lower boundary GSSP: Pengchong Section, Guangxi, China; 24.4333°N 109.4500°E
- Lower GSSP ratified: 2008
- Upper boundary definition: Not formally defined
- Upper boundary definition candidates: FAD of the conodont Lochriea ziegleri
- Upper boundary GSSP candidate section(s): Verkhnyaya Kardailovka, Ural Mountains; Nashui, Luodian County, Guizhou, China

The Visean, Viséan or Visian is an age in the ICS geologic timescale or a stage in the stratigraphic column. It is the second stage of the Mississippian, the lower subsystem of the Carboniferous. The Visean lasted from 346.7 to 330.3 Ma. It follows the Tournaisian age/stage and is followed by the Serpukhovian age/stage.

== Name and definitions ==
The Viséan Stage was introduced by Belgian geologist André Dumont in 1832. Dumont named this stage after the city of Visé in Belgium's Liège Province. Before being used as an international stage, the Viséan Stage was part of the (West) European regional geologic time scale, in which it followed the Tournaisian Stage and is followed by the Namurian Stage. In the North American regional scale, the Viséan Stage correlates with the upper Osagean, the Meramecian and lower Chesterian stages. In the Chinese regional time scale, it correlates with the lower and middle Tatangian series.

The base of the Viséan Stage is at the first appearance of the fusulinid species Eoparastaffella simplex (morphotype 1/morphotype 2). The type locality for the stage base used to be in a road section below the castle of Dinant in Belgium, but this type locality proved to be insufficient for the purpose of stratigraphic correlation. A GSSP has been proposed in the Luzhai Formation near Penchong in the Chinese province of Guangxi. The top (the base of the Serpukhovian and Namurian) is laid at the first appearance of the conodont Lochriea ziegleri, or at the base of the biozone of goniatite Cravenoceras leion.

== Biota ==
The Carboniferous-Earliest Permian Biodiversification Event began in the Viséan, coinciding with the start of the main phase of the Late Palaeozoic Ice Age.

The late Viséan saw the widespread reappearance of metazoan reefs after their devastation during the Hangenberg Event.

One of the tetrapods that lived during the Visean age was Westlothiana, a reptile-like amphibian. Though originally thought to be the earliest discovered amniote, more recent research has cast doubt on this interpretation.

== Biostratigraphy ==
The Visean contains four conodont biozones:

- Lochriea nodosa Zone
- Lochriea mononodosa Zone
- Gnathodus bilineatus Zone
- Gnathodus texanus Zone

In British stratigraphy, the Visean is subdivided into five substages. From youngest to oldest, these are:

- Brigantian
- Asbian
- Holkerian
- Arundian
- Chadian (the lower part of this substage falls in the Tournaisian)
