= Sergei Nikitin (geologist) =

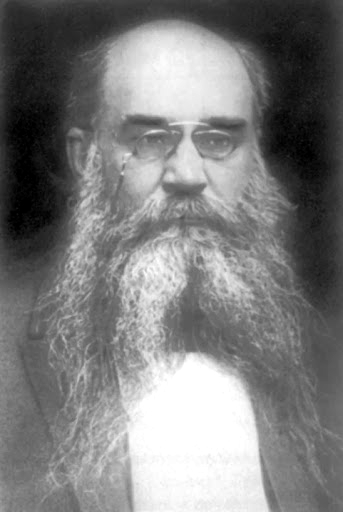

Sergei Nikolaevich Nikitin (4 February 1851 – 18 November 1909) was a Russian geologist and paleontologist. He took a special interest in stratigraphy and worked especially on the progression of the Jurassic of Central Russia. He was also involved in studies on hydrogeology aimed at water management in Russia.

Nikitin was born in Moscow where his father was an anatomist at Moscow University. He took an early interest in the natural sciences and at school he was introduced to field geology and botany by G.E. Shchurovskii and N.N. Kaufman. He joined Moscow University, graduating in 1871. He then taught botany and geography at schools and conducted courses on mineralogy and geology for women. He then obtained a master's degree for studies on ammonites in 1879. When the Russian Geological Survey was created he was appointed senior geologist in 1882 and began to examine stratigraphy and was appointed by the Imperial Saint Petersburg Mineralogical Studies along with K. O. Milashevich who later withdrew due to poor health. He studied Jurassic strata in Moscow, the Oka and Upper Volga basins.

Among Nikitin's students was the pioneering geologist Maria Tsvetaeva. Nikitin received the Helmersen Prize of the St. Petersburg Academy of Sciences for 1883 and the Medal of Constantine from the Russian Geographical Society in 1894. Nikitin is buried at the Smolensk Cemetery in St. Petersburg.
