= Moscow Basin =

The Moscow Basin is a major sedimentary basin and tectonic structural feature in the stable East European Craton. It has been widely studied by Russian and Scandinavian geologists.

== Formation and geological history ==
The Fennoscandia Shield and its components, the Russian Platform and Baltic Shield make up a large portion of the East European Craton. Crystalline basement rock formed between 2 billion and 1.65 billion years ago, with most activity ending around 1.75 billion years ago. The rocks were then affected by the Svecofennian orogeny.

Some of the oldest sedimentary rocks in the Moscow Basin date to the Late Riphean, in the form of siltstone and limestone. During this period the Moscow Rift formed and East European Craton extension followed earlier compression and inversion. A shallow marine environment appeared in the late Vendian extending into the Early Cambrian.

By the late Cambrian, deeper marine conditions developed forming shale and siltstone. Carbonates deposited during a return to shallower marine conditions in the Ordovician and Silurian. A discontinuity from the Silurian into the Devonian suggests uplift and a major inversion, followed by off and on carbonate and shale deposition through the Carboniferous and Permian. Large sandstone deposits dating to the Triassic indicate a possible river delta environment. During the Paleozoic and through the Mesozoic the Sukhona Swell and Sukhon Arch formed next to the basin over the earlier Soligalich Graben-Trough.
