= Moscovian age =

Fifth stage of the Carboniferous

Moscovian
- 315.2 ± 0.2 – 307.0 ± 0.1 Ma
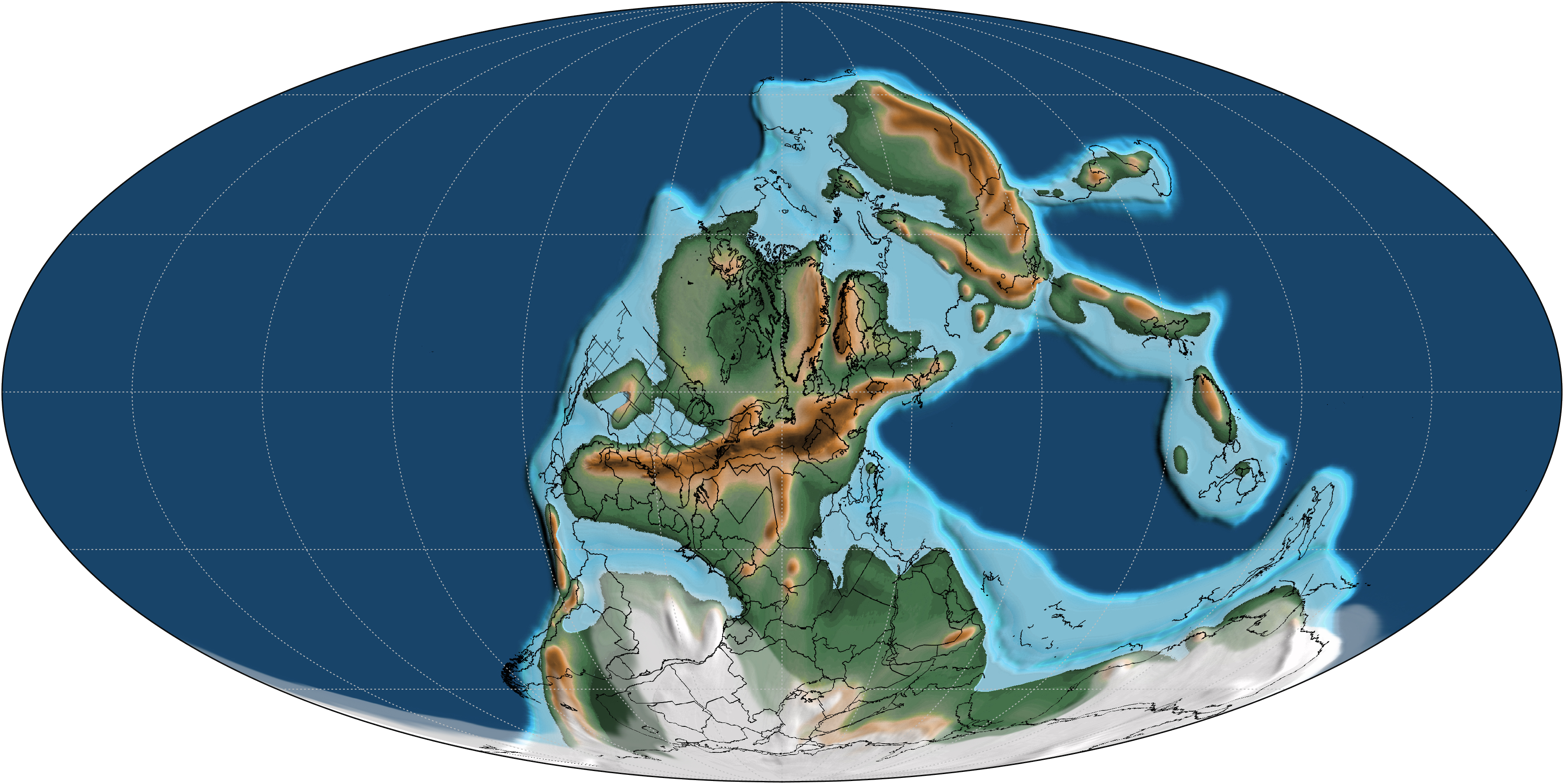
- Paleogeography of the Moscovian, 310 Ma

Chronology
← / Carboniferous Rainforest Collapse; ← / Mazon Creek Fossils; ← / End of Romer's Gap; ← / Beginning of Romer's Gap
Subdivision of the Carboniferous according to the ICS, as of 2024. Vertical axis scale: Millions of years ago

Etymology
- Name formality: Formal

Usage information
- Celestial body: Earth
- Regional usage: Global (ICS)
- Time scale(s) used: ICS Time Scale

Definition
- Chronological unit: Age
- Stratigraphic unit: Stage
- Time span formality: Formal
- Lower boundary definition: Not formally defined
- Lower boundary definition candidates: FAD of the Conodont Idiognathoides postsulcatus or Declinognathodus donetzianus
- Lower boundary GSSP candidate section(s): Southern Ural Mountains; Nashui, Luodian County, Guizhou, China
- Upper boundary definition: Not formally defined
- Upper boundary definition candidates: FAD of the Fusulinid Protriticites or 1 million years older Montiparus montiparus
- Upper boundary GSSP candidate section(s): Southern Ural mountains; Southwest USA; Nashui, Luodian County, Guizhou, China

The Moscovian is, in the ICS geologic timescale, a stage or age in the Pennsylvanian, the youngest subsystem of the Carboniferous. The Moscovian age lasted from 315.2 to 307 Mya, is preceded by the Bashkirian and is followed by the Kasimovian. The Moscovian overlaps with the European regional Westphalian stage and the North American Atokan and Desmoinesian stages.

== Name and definition ==
The Moscovian Stage was introduced by Sergei Nikitin (1851–1909) in 1890, using brachiopods in the Moscow Basin of European Russia. Nikitin named the stage after Moscow, then a major city and now the capital of Russia.

The base of the Moscovian is close to the first appearances of the conodonts Declinognathodus donetzianus and Idiognathoides postsulcatus or otherwise the fusulinid Aljutovella aljutovica. Because the fusulinid species are regionally different, they can not be used for worldwide correlation. A Global Boundary Stratotype Section and Point for the Moscovian Stage has yet to be defined (2008). A proposal is to use the first appearance of the conodont Diplognathodus ellesmerensis, but since the species is rare and its evolution relatively unknown, it has not been accepted yet.

The top of the Moscovian (base of the Kasimovian) is at the base of the fusulinid biozone of Obsoletes obsoletes and Protriticites pseudomontiparus, or with the first appearance of the ammonite genus Parashumardites.

== Subdivisions ==
In European Russia and Eastern Europe, where the stage was first recognized, the Moscovian is subdivided into four regional substages: Vereiskian, Kashirskian, Podolskian, and Myachkovskian, named after towns near Moscow (Vereya, Kashira, Podolsk, and Myachkovo).

The Moscovian can biostratigraphically be divided into five conodont biozones:

- Neognathodus roundyi and Streptognathodus cancellosus Zone
- Neognathodus medexultimus and Streptognathodus concinnus Zone
- Streptognathodus dissectus Zone
- Neognathodus uralicus Zone
- Declinognathodus donetzianus Zone
