= Bashkirian =

Fourth stage of the Carboniferous

- 323.4 ± 0.4 – 315.2 ± 0.2 Ma
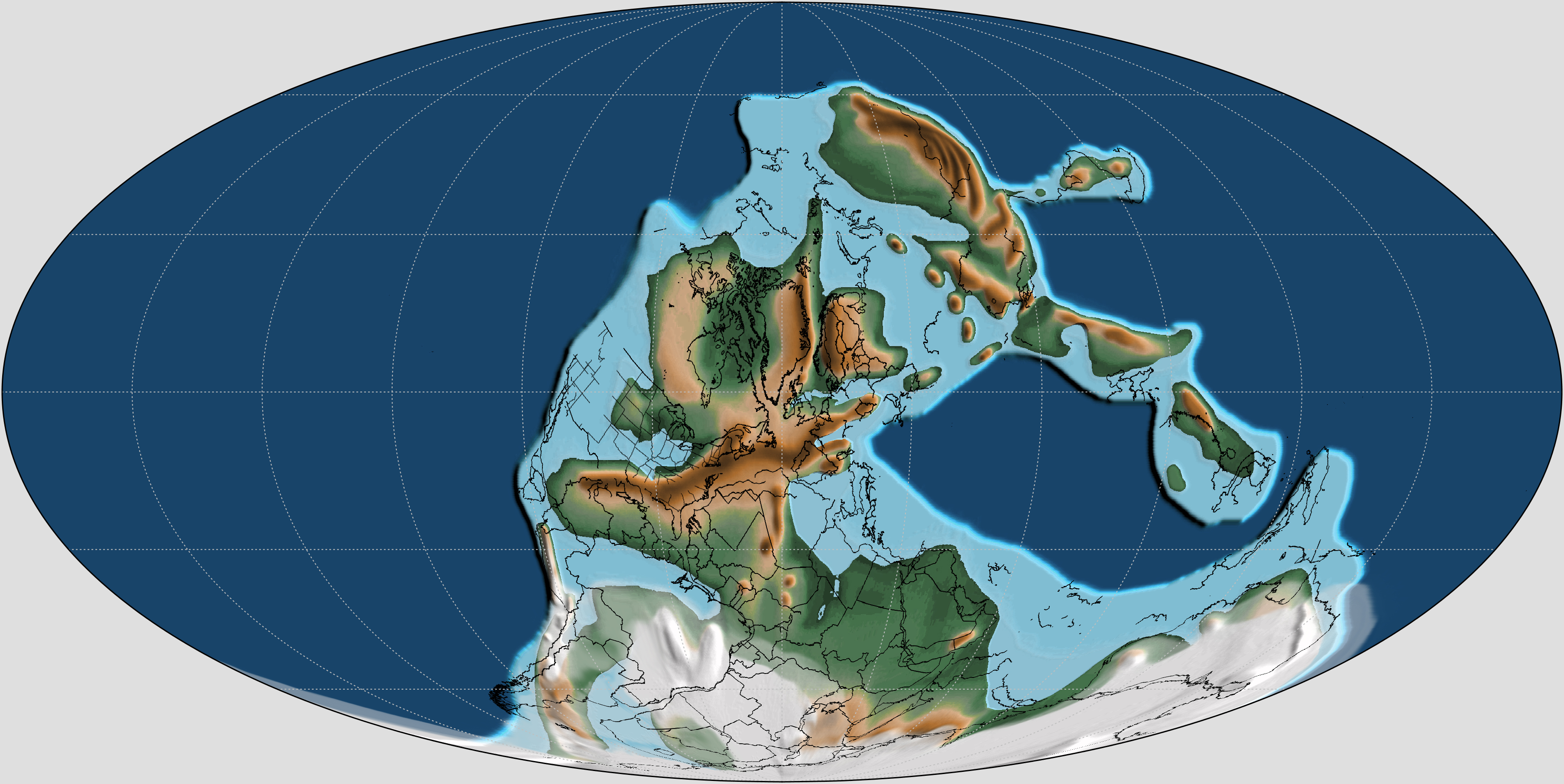
- Mollweide map of Earth 320 million years ago, with black outlines depicting countries in their locations

Chronology
← / Carboniferous Rainforest Collapse; ← / Mazon Creek Fossils; ← / End of Romer's Gap; ← / Beginning of Romer's Gap
Subdivision of the Carboniferous according to the ICS, as of 2024. Vertical axis scale: Millions of years ago

Etymology
- Name formality: Formal

Usage information
- Celestial body: Earth
- Regional usage: Global (ICS)
- Time scale(s) used: ICS Time Scale

Definition
- Chronological unit: Age
- Stratigraphic unit: Stage
- Time span formality: Formal
- Lower boundary definition: FAD of the Conodont Declinognathodus nodiliferus
- Lower boundary GSSP: Arrow Canyon, Nevada, USA; 36.7333°N 114.7778°W
- Lower GSSP ratified: 1996
- Upper boundary definition: Not formally defined
- Upper boundary definition candidates: FAD of the Conodont Idiognathoides postsulcatus or Declinognathodus donetzianus
- Upper boundary GSSP candidate section(s): Southern Ural Mountains; Nashui, Luodian County, Guizhou, China

The Bashkirian is, in the International Commission on Stratigraphy geologic timescale, the lowest stage or oldest age of the Pennsylvanian. The Bashkirian age lasted from 323.4 to 315.2 Ma, is preceded by the Serpukhovian and is followed by the Moscovian.

The Bashkirian overlaps with the upper part of the Namurian and lower part of the Westphalian stages from regional European stratigraphy. It also overlaps with the North American Morrowan and Atokan stages and the Chinese Luosuan and lower Huashibanian stages.

== Name and definition ==
The Bashkirian was named after Bashkiria, the then Russian name of the republic of Bashkortostan in the southern Ural Mountains of Russia, home of the Bashkir people. The stage was introduced by Russian stratigrapher Sofia Semikhatova in 1934.

The base of the Bashkirian is at the first appearance of conodont species Declinognathodus noduliferus. The top of the stage (the base of the Moscovian) is at the first appearance of the conodonts Declinognathodus donetzianus or Idiognathoides postsulcatus, or at the first appearance of fusulinid Aljutovella aljutovica. The GSSP (type location for the base of a stage) for the Bashkirian is in the lower Bird Spring Formation at Arrow Canyon, Nevada.

== Subdivision ==
The Bashkirian contains six biozones based on conodont index fossils:

- Neognathodus atokaensis Zone
- Declinognathodus marginodosus Zone
- Idiognathodus sinuosus Zone
- Neognathodus askynensis Zone
- Idiognathoides sinuatus Zone
- Declinognathodus noduliferus Zone
