= Kasimovian =

Sixth stage of the Carboniferous

- 307.0 ± 0.1 – 303.7 ± 0.1 Ma

Chronology
← / Carboniferous Rainforest Collapse; ← / Mazon Creek Fossils; ← / End of Romer's Gap; ← / Beginning of Romer's Gap
Subdivision of the Carboniferous according to the ICS, as of 2024. Vertical axis scale: Millions of years ago

Etymology
- Name formality: Formal

Usage information
- Celestial body: Earth
- Regional usage: Global (ICS)
- Time scale(s) used: ICS Time Scale

Definition
- Chronological unit: Age
- Stratigraphic unit: Stage
- Time span formality: Formal
- Lower boundary definition: Not formally defined
- Lower boundary definition candidates: FAD of the Fusulinid Protriticites or 1 million years older Montiparus montiparus
- Lower boundary GSSP candidate section(s): Southern Ural Mountains; Southwest USA; Nashui, Luodian County, Guizhou, China
- Upper boundary definition: Not formally defined
- Upper boundary definition candidates: FAD of the Conodont Idiognathodus simulator
- Upper boundary GSSP candidate section(s): Southern Ural mountains; Nashui, Luodian County, Guizhou, China

The Kasimovian is a geochronologic age or chronostratigraphic stage in the ICS geologic timescale. It is the third stage in the Pennsylvanian (late Carboniferous), lasting from 307 to 303.7 Ma. The Kasimovian Stage follows the Moscovian and is followed by the Gzhelian. The Kasimovian saw an extinction event which occurred around 305 mya, referred to as the Carboniferous Rainforest Collapse. It roughly corresponds to the Missourian in North American geochronology and the Stephanian in western European geochronology.

== Name and definition ==
The Kasimovian is named after the Russian city of Kasimov. The stage was split from the Moscovian in 1926 by Boris Dan'shin (1891-1941), who gave it the name Teguliferina horizon. The name was posthumously changed to Kasimov horizon by Dan'shin in 1947. The name Kasimovian was introduced by Georgy Teodorovich in 1949.

The base of the Kasimovian Stage is at the base of the fusulinid biozone of Obsoletes obsoletes and Protriticites pseudomontiparus or with the first appearance of the ammonite genus Parashumardites. The top of the stage is close to the first appearances of the fusulinid genera Daixina, Jigulites and Rugosofusulina or the first appearance of the conodont Streptognathodus zethus.

== Biozones ==
The Kasimovian is subdivided into three conodont biozones:

- Idiognathodus toretzianus Zone
- Idiognathodus sagittatus Zone
- Streptognathodus excelsus and Streptognathodus makhlinae Zone
