= System (stratigraphy) =

Sequence of rock layers laid down in the same geological period

Units in geochronology and stratigraphy
Segments of rock (strata) in chronostratigraphy	Time spans in geochronology	Notes to geochronological units
Eonothem	Eon	4 total, half a billion years or more
Erathem	Era	10 defined, several hundred million years
System	Period	22 defined, tens to ~one hundred million years
Series	Epoch	38 defined, tens of millions of years
Stage	Age	101 defined, millions of years
Chronozone	Chron	subdivision of an age, not used by the ICS timescale

A system in stratigraphy is a sequence of strata (rock layers) that were laid down together within the same corresponding geological period. The associated period is a chronological time unit, a part of the geological time scale, while the system is a unit of chronostratigraphy. Systems are unrelated to lithostratigraphy, which subdivides rock layers on their lithology. Systems are subdivisions of erathems and are themselves divided into series and stages.

== Systems in the geological timescale ==
The systems of the Phanerozoic were defined during the 19th century, beginning with the Cretaceous (by Belgian geologist Jean d'Omalius d'Halloy in the Paris Basin) and the Carboniferous (by British geologists William Conybeare and William Phillips in 1822). The Paleozoic and Mesozoic were divided into the currently used systems before the second half of the 19th century, except for a minor revision when the Ordovician system was added in 1879.

The Cenozoic has seen more recent revisions by the International Commission on Stratigraphy. It has been divided into three systems with the Paleogene and Neogene replacing the former Tertiary System though the succeeding Quaternary remains. The one-time system names of Paleocene, Eocene, Oligocene, Miocene and Pliocene are now series within the Paleogene and Neogene.

Another recent development is the official division of the Proterozoic into systems, which was decided in 2004.
