= Asselian =

First stage of the Permian

- 298.9 ± 0.15 – 293.52 ± 0.17 Ma
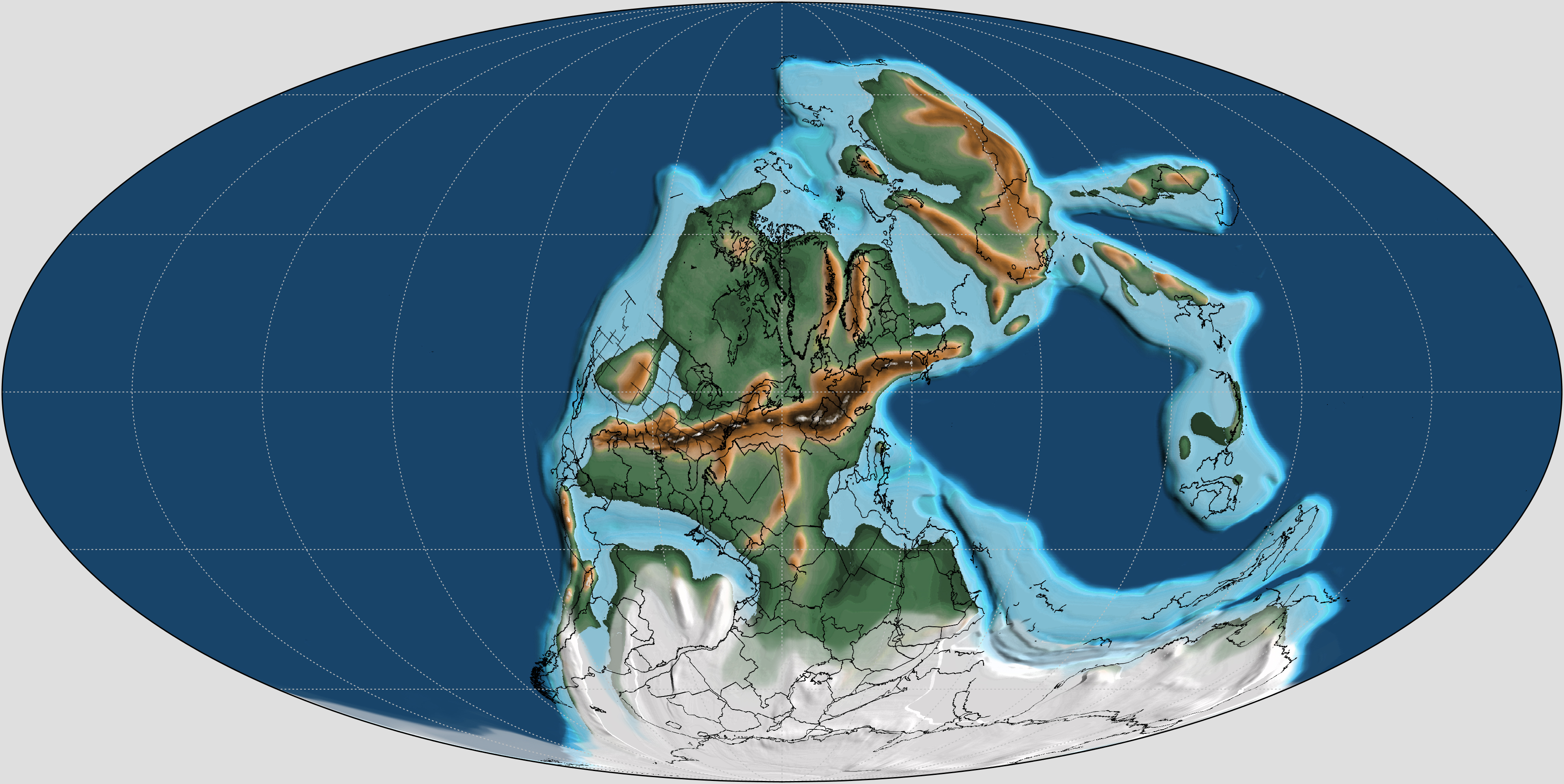
- Mollweide map of Earth 295 million years ago, with black outlines depicting countries in their locations

Chronology
| ← / Permian-Triassic mass extinction event; ← / end-Capitanian extinction event; ← / Olson's Extinction |
Subdivision of the Permian according to the ICS, as of 2023. Vertical axis scale: Millions of years ago

Etymology
- Name formality: Formal

Usage information
- Celestial body: Earth
- Regional usage: Global (ICS)
- Time scale(s) used: ICS Time Scale

Definition
- Chronological unit: Age
- Stratigraphic unit: Stage
- Time span formality: Formal
- Lower boundary definition: FAD of the Conodont Streptognathodus isolatus within the morphotype Streptognathodus wabaunsensis chronocline
- Lower boundary GSSP: Aidaralash, Ural Mountains, Kazakhstan; 50.2458°N 57.8914°E
- Lower GSSP ratified: 1996
- Upper boundary definition: FAD of the Conodont Mesogondolella monstra
- Upper boundary GSSP: Usolka section, Southern Urals, Russia. 53.9247°N 56.7287°E
- Upper GSSP ratified: 2018

In the geologic timescale, the Asselian is the earliest geochronologic age or lowermost chronostratigraphic stage of the Permian. It is a subdivision of the Cisuralian Epoch or Series. The Asselian lasted between 298.9 and 293.52 million years ago (Ma). It was preceded by the Gzhelian (the latest or uppermost subdivision in the Carboniferous) and followed by the Sakmarian.

== Stratigraphy ==
The Asselian Stage was introduced into scientific literature in 1954, when the Russian stratigrapher V.E. Ruzhenchev split it off from the Artinskian. At the time, the Artinskian still encompassed most of the lower Permian – its current definitions are more restricted. The Asselian is named after the Assel River in the southern Ural Mountains of Kazakhstan and Bashkortostan.

The base of the Asselian Stage is equivalent to the base of the Cisuralian Series and the Permian System. It is defined as the point in the stratigraphic record where fossils of the conodont Streptognathodus isolatus first appear. The global reference profile for the base (the GSSP or golden spike) is located in the valley of the Aidaralash River, near Aqtöbe in the Ural Mountains of Kazakhstan. Other reference species which approximate the base of the Asselian include Streptognathodus invaginatus and Str. nodulinearis (conodonts) and Sphaeroschwagerina vulgaris and Sph. fusiformis (fusilinids).

The top of the Asselian stage (the base of the Sakmarian stage) is at the first appearance of conodont species Mesogondolella monstra.

Asselian biostratigraphy is mostly defined by the evolution of Streptognathodus. There is some debate over the exact sequence of species; one option, according to Henderson (2018), lists the following biozones, from youngest to oldest:

- zone of Streptognathodus postfusus / Streptognathodus barskovi
- zone of Streptognathodus fusus
- zone of Streptognathodus constrictus
- zone of Streptognathodus sigmoidalis
- zone of Streptognathodus cristellaris
- zone of Streptognathodus glenisteri
- zone of Streptognathodus isolatus

=== Regional equivalents ===
In North America, the regional equivalent of the Asselian is the Nealian stage. The Nealian (lower Wolfcampian) is named after the Neal Ranch Formation in the Glass Mountains of west Texas. In South China, the Asselian is equivalent to at least the lower part of the regional Zisongian stage of the Chuanshanian Series. Both the Nealian and Zisongian are defined by fusilinid assemblages, so their precise correlation to the conodont-based global timescale is uncertain.

The Asselian occupies a portion of major terrestrial sediment units in Europe, namely the Autunian series of France and the lower Rotliegend of Germany.

== Notable formations ==
- Altenglan Formation (Germany)
- Archer City Formation (Texas, USA)
- Council Grove Group (in part) (Kansas / Nebraska, USA)
- Dunkard Group (in part) (West Virginia / Ohio / Pennsylvania, USA)
- Goldlauter Formation (Germany)
- Manebach Formation (Germany)
- Meisenheim Formation (Germany)
- Muse Formation (France)
