= Cisuralian =

First series of the Permian

- 298.9 ± 0.15 – 274.4 ± 0.4 Ma
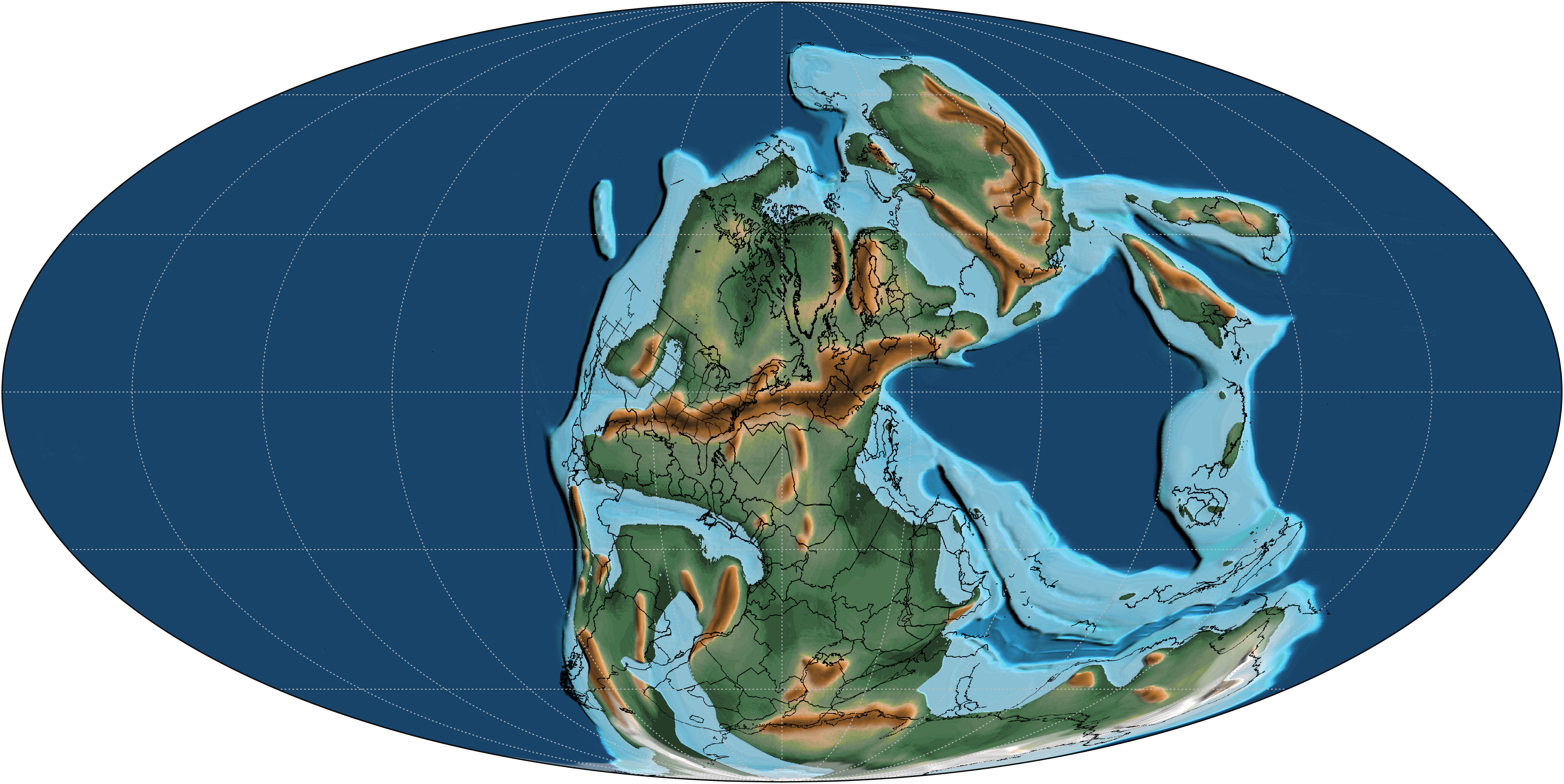
- A map of Earth 285 million years ago during the Cisuralian Epoch, Artinskian Age

Chronology
← / Permian-Triassic mass extinction event; ← / end-Capitanian extinction event; ← / Olson's Extinction
Subdivision of the Permian according to the ICS, as of 2023. Vertical axis scale: Millions of years ago

Etymology
- Name formality: Formal
- Synonym(s): Early/Lower Permian

Usage information
- Celestial body: Earth
- Regional usage: Global (ICS)
- Time scale(s) used: ICS Time Scale

Definition
- Chronological unit: Epoch
- Stratigraphic unit: Series
- Time span formality: Formal
- Lower boundary definition: FAD of the conodont Streptognathodus isolatus within the morphotype Streptognathodus wabaunsensis chronocline
- Lower boundary GSSP: Aidaralash, Ural Mountains, Kazakhstan; 50.2458°N 57.8914°E
- Lower GSSP ratified: 1996
- Upper boundary definition: FAD of the Conodont Jinogondolella nanginkensis
- Upper boundary GSSP: Stratotype Canyon, Guadalupe Mountains, Texas, United States; 31.8767°N 104.8768°W
- Upper GSSP ratified: 2001

The Cisuralian, also known as the Early Permian, is the first series/epoch of the Permian. The Cisuralian was preceded by the Pennsylvanian and followed by the Guadalupian. The Cisuralian Epoch is named after the western slopes of the Ural Mountains in Russia and Kazakhstan and dates between 298.9 ± 0.15 – 274.4 ± 0.4 Ma.

In the regional stratigraphy of southwestern North America, the Cisuralian encompasses two series: the Wolfcampian (Asselian to mid-Artinskian) and Leonardian (mid-Artinskian to Kungurian).

The series saw the appearance of beetles and flies and was a relatively stable warming period of about 21 million years.

== Name and background ==
The Cisuralian is the first series or epoch of the Permian. The Cisuralian was preceded by the last Pennsylvanian epoch (Gzhelian) and is followed by the Permian Guadalupian Epoch.

The name "Cisuralian" was proposed in 1982, and approved by the International Subcommission on Permian Stratigraphy in 1996. The Cisuralian Epoch is named after the western slopes of the Ural Mountains in Russia and Kazakhstan.

Limestones on the edge of Russian Platform and make up the Ishimbay oil fields. These oil fields were vital to the Soviet Union during WW2 when the Germans controlled the oil fields to the west.

The International Chronostratigraphic Chart (v2018/07) provides a numerical age of 298.9 ± 0.15 – 272.3 ± 0.5 Ma.

The base of the Cisuralian series and the Permian system is defined as the place in the stratigraphic record where fossils of the conodont Streptognathodus isolatus first appear. The global reference profile for the base (the GSSP or golden spike) is located in the valley of the Aidaralash River, near Aqtöbe in the Ural Mountains of Kazakhstan.

== Geography ==
The world at the start of the Cisuralian

Gondwana collided with Laurussia and created the Alleghenian orogeny in present-day North America. In northwestern Europe, the Hercynian orogeny continued. This created the large supercontinent, Pangea, by the middle of the early Permian, which was to have an impact on the climate.

== Climate ==
At the start of the Permian, the Late Palaeozoic Ice Age, which began in the Carboniferous, was at its peak. Glaciers receded over the course of the late Cisuralian as the Earth's climate gradually warmed, particularly during the Artinskian Warming Event, drying the continent's interiors. The pan-tropical belt of Pangaea experienced particularly significant aridification during this epoch.

== Biodiversity ==
The swampy fringes were mostly ferns, seed ferns, and lycophytes. The series saw the appearance of beetles and flies.

The coal swamps from the Carboniferous declined but the herbivores, Diadectes and Edaphosaurus persisted until the end of this series, approximately. The dry interior had small insectivores. Caseids and prototherapsid Tetraceratops made their appearance. The marine life was probably more diverse than modern times as the climate warmed. Unusual sharks such as Helicoprion continued in this series.

Early Permian terrestrial faunas were dominated by pelycosaurs (a paraphyletic group of early synapsids), diadectids, and temnospondyls, The pelycosaurs appeared during the Late Carboniferous, and reached their apex in the Cisuralian remaining the dominant land animals for some 40 million years. A few continued into the Capitanian. They were succeeded by the therapsids.

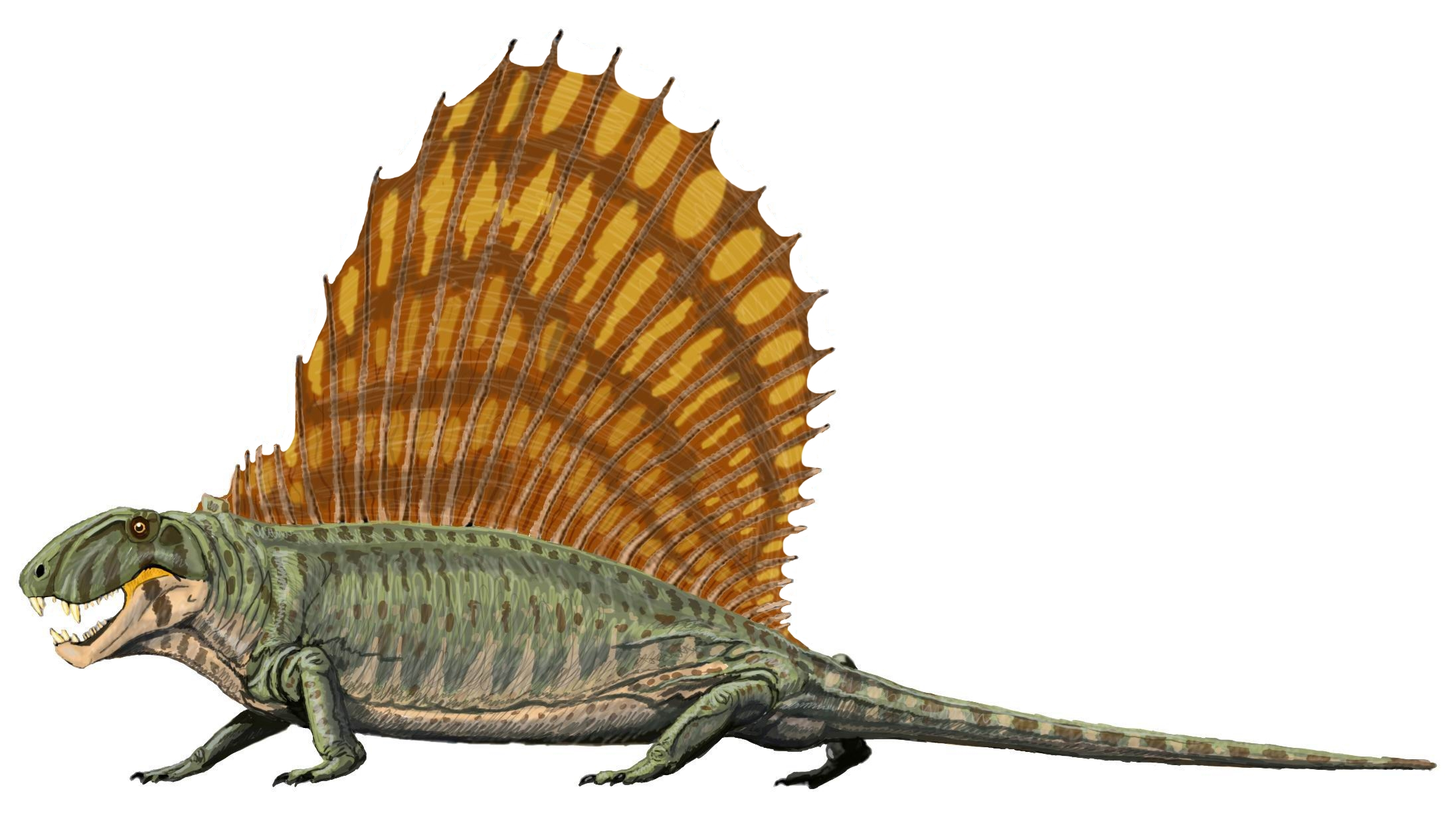
Dimetrodon, a pelycosaur, was at the top of the food chain in the Cisuralian

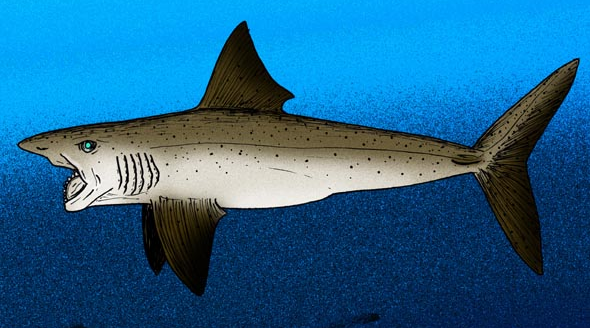
Helicoprion bessonovi with characteristic 'tooth-whorl' at front of jaw

== Subdivisions ==
=== Global ===
- Asselian stage (298.9 ± 0.15 – 294.6 ± 0.8 Ma)
- Sakmarian stage (294.6 ± 0.8 – 290.1 ± 0.7 Ma)
- Artinskian stage (290.1 ± 0.7 – 283.5 ± 0.7 Ma)
- Kungurian stage (283.5 ± 0.7 – 272.3 ± 0.5 Ma)

=== Regional ===
- New Zealand
  - Telfordian (289 – 278 Ma)
  - Mangapirian (278 – 270.6 Ma)
