= Roadian =

Fifth stage of the Permian

- 274.4 ± 0.4 – 266.9 ± 0.4 Ma
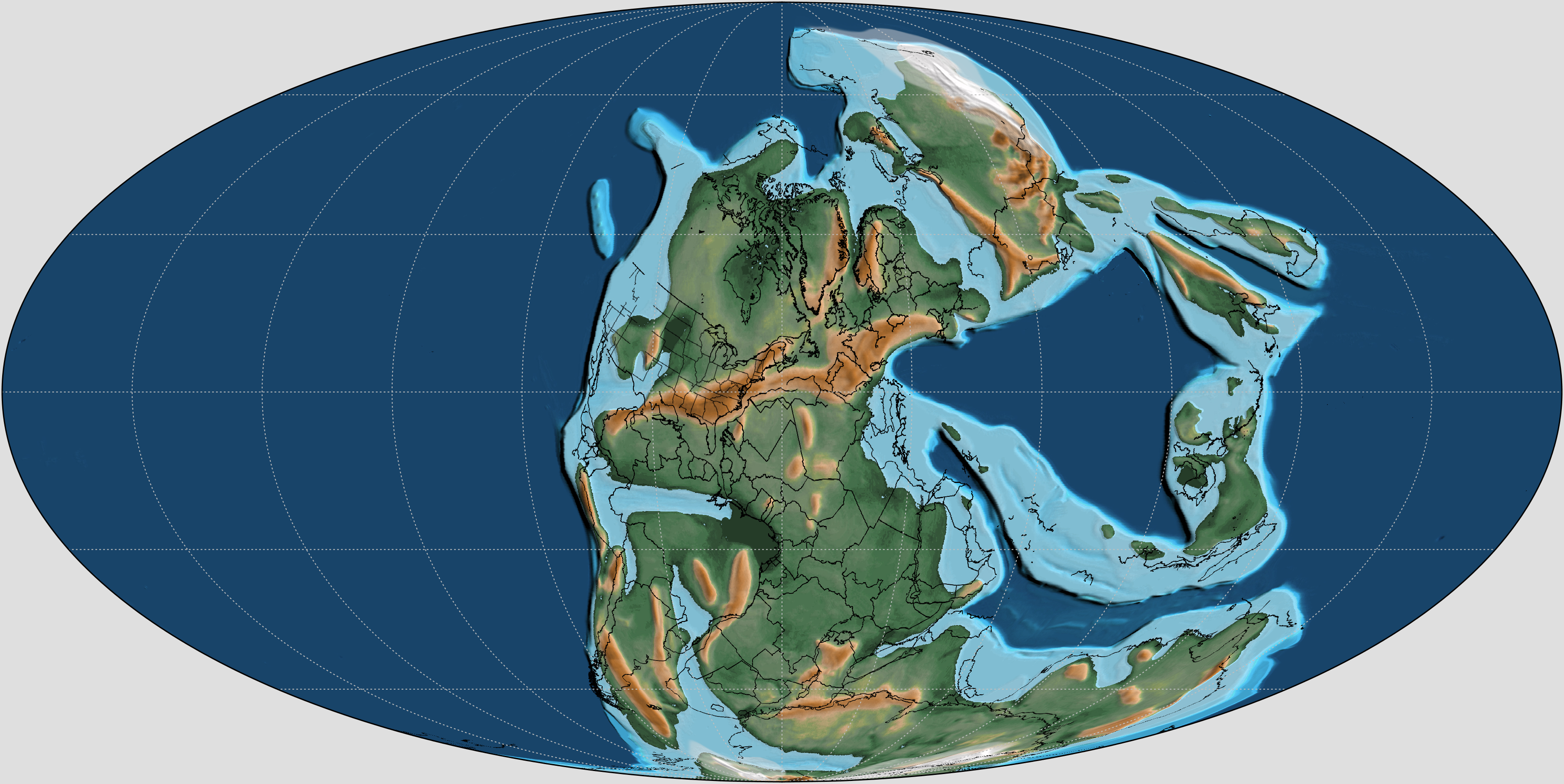
- Mollweide map of Earth 270 million years ago, with black outlines depicting countries in their locations

Chronology
← / Permian-Triassic mass extinction event; ← / end-Capitanian extinction event; ← / Olson's Extinction
Subdivision of the Permian according to the ICS, as of 2023. Vertical axis scale: Millions of years ago

Etymology
- Name formality: Formal

Usage information
- Celestial body: Earth
- Regional usage: Global (ICS)
- Time scale(s) used: ICS Time Scale

Definition
- Chronological unit: Age
- Stratigraphic unit: Stage
- Time span formality: Formal
- Lower boundary definition: FAD of the Conodont Jinogondolella nanginkensis
- Lower boundary GSSP: Stratotype Canyon, Guadalupe Mountains, Texas, USA; 31.8767°N 104.8768°W
- Lower GSSP ratified: 2001
- Upper boundary definition: FAD of the Conodont Jinogondolella aserrata
- Upper boundary GSSP: Guadalupe Pass, Guadalupe Mountains, Texas, USA; 31.8658°N 104.8328°W
- Upper GSSP ratified: 2001

In the geologic timescale, the Roadian is an age or stage of the Permian. It is the earliest or lower of three subdivisions of the Guadalupian Epoch or Series. The Roadian lasted between 274.4 and 266.9 million years ago (Ma). It was preceded by the Kungurian and followed by the Wordian.

== Stratigraphy ==
In 1961, the regional timescale used for the southeastern US had the Wordian and Capitanian as subdivisions of the Guadalupian. Efforts to correlate the Permian stratigraphy of the southeastern US with that of Russia led to the conclusion that between the Wordian stage and the Russian Artinskian stage, another stage needed to be introduced. This stage, the Roadian Stage, was established in 1968 and took its name from the Road Canyon Formation in Brewster County, Texas, formerly considered the lower (oldest) part of the Word Formation. The stage was added to the internationally used IUGS timescale in 2001.

The base of the Roadian is defined as the place in the stratigraphic record where fossils of conodont species Jinogondolella nankingensis first appears. The global reference profile for the base (the GSSP) is located in Stratotype Canyon in the Guadalupe Mountains, Texas (31°52′36″N 104°52′36″W). The top of the Roadian (the base of the Wordian Stage) is at the first appearance of fossils of conodont species Jinogondolella aserrata.

== Life ==
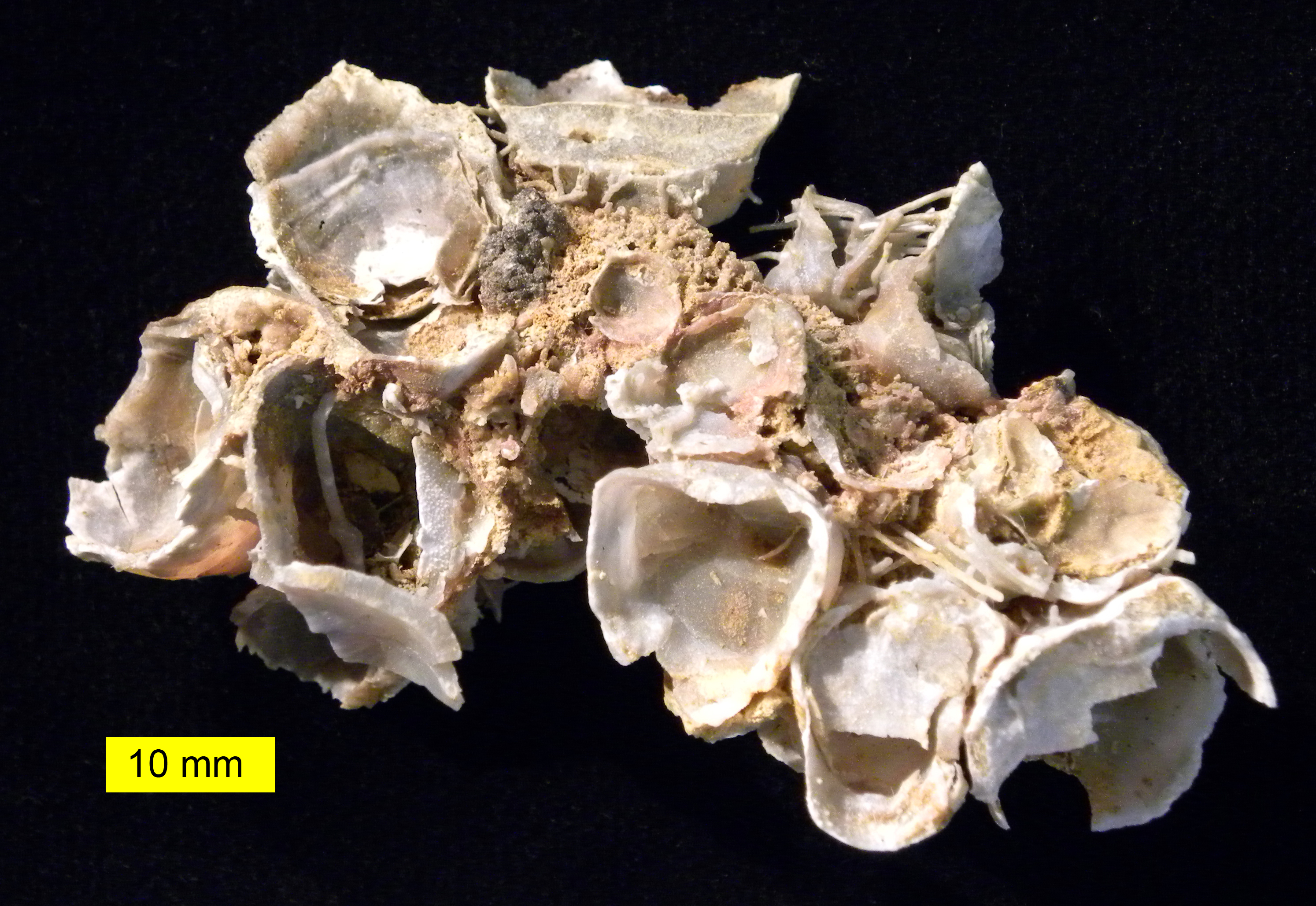
Hercosestria cribrosa, a reef-forming Roadian brachiopod from the Glass Mountains of Texas

Some studies suggested that Olson's Extinction, a worldwide loss of terrestrial vertebrate life occurred during the Early Guadalupian (Roadian, Wordian), but the temporal resolution of most studies only indicates that this possible extinction event indicates around the Kungurian/Roadian boundary. Studies using higher-resolution stratigraphic data and the fossilized birth-death model suggest that this even is actually a slow decline over 20 Ma that started in the Sakmarian and that may have extended into the Roadian.

== Notable formations ==
- Cherry Canyon Formation (New Mexico, Texas, USA)
- Road Canyon Formation (Texas, USA)
