= Road Canyon Formation =

- Stratigraphic range: Kungurian-Roadian; ~283–268.8 Ma
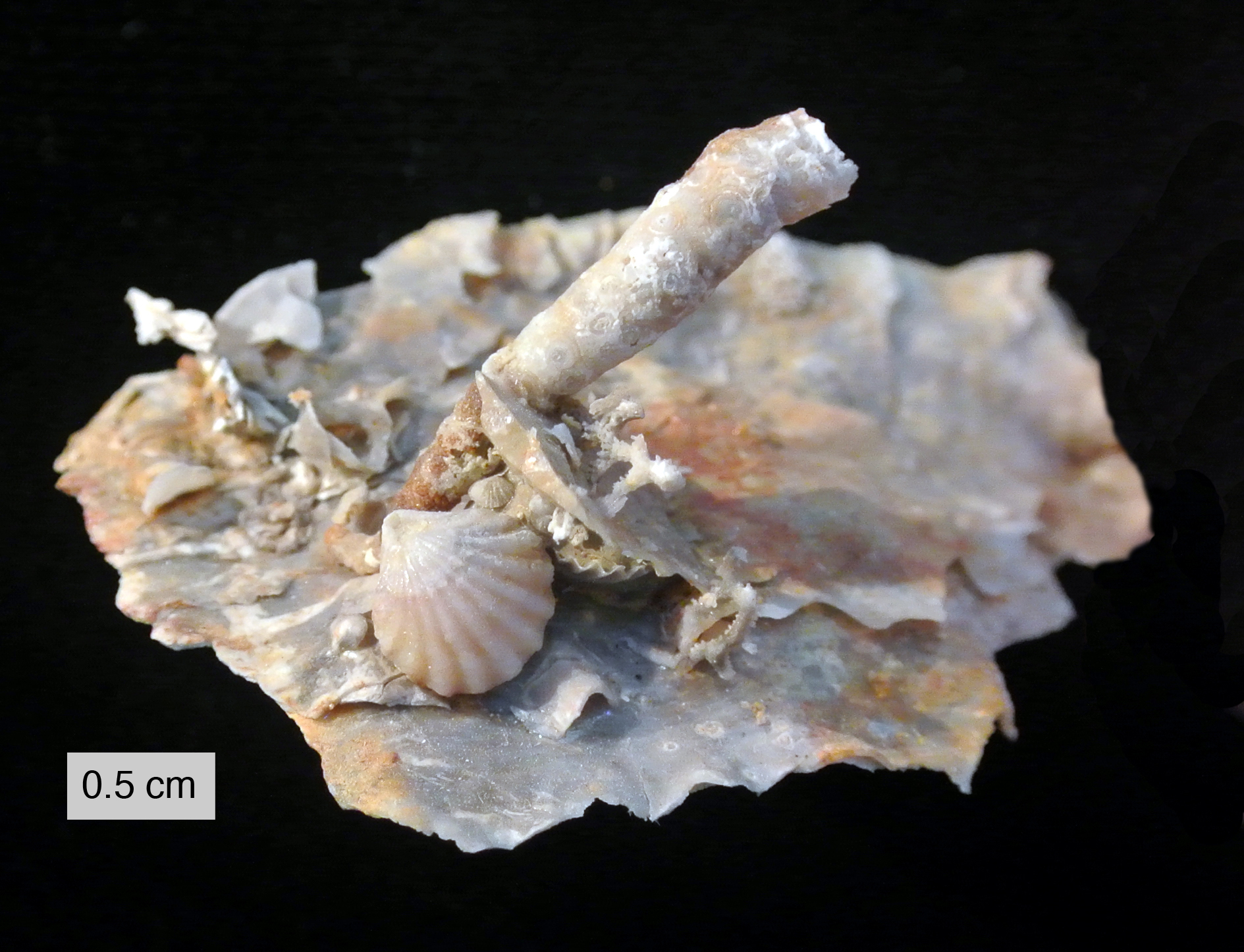
- Fossils from the Road Canyon Formation
- Type: Formation
- Underlies: Word Formation

Lithology
- Primary: Limestone
- Other: Shale, siltstone

Location
- Coordinates: 30.4°N 103.3°W
- Approximate paleocoordinates: 1.4°N 33.2°W
- Region: Texas
- Country: United States
- Extent: Glass Mountains

Type section
- Named for: Road Canyon
- Named by: R.L. King
- Year defined: 1931
- Road Canyon Formation (the United States) Road Canyon Formation (Texas)

The Road Canyon Formation is a geologic formation in Texas. It preserves fossils dating back to the Permian period.

== Definition ==
The formation is the defining unit for the Roadian stage of the Permian period.

== See also ==
- List of fossiliferous stratigraphic units in Texas
- Paleontology in Texas
