= Gzhelian =

Seventh and final stage of the Carboniferous

- 303.7 ± 0.1 – 298.9 ± 0.15 Ma
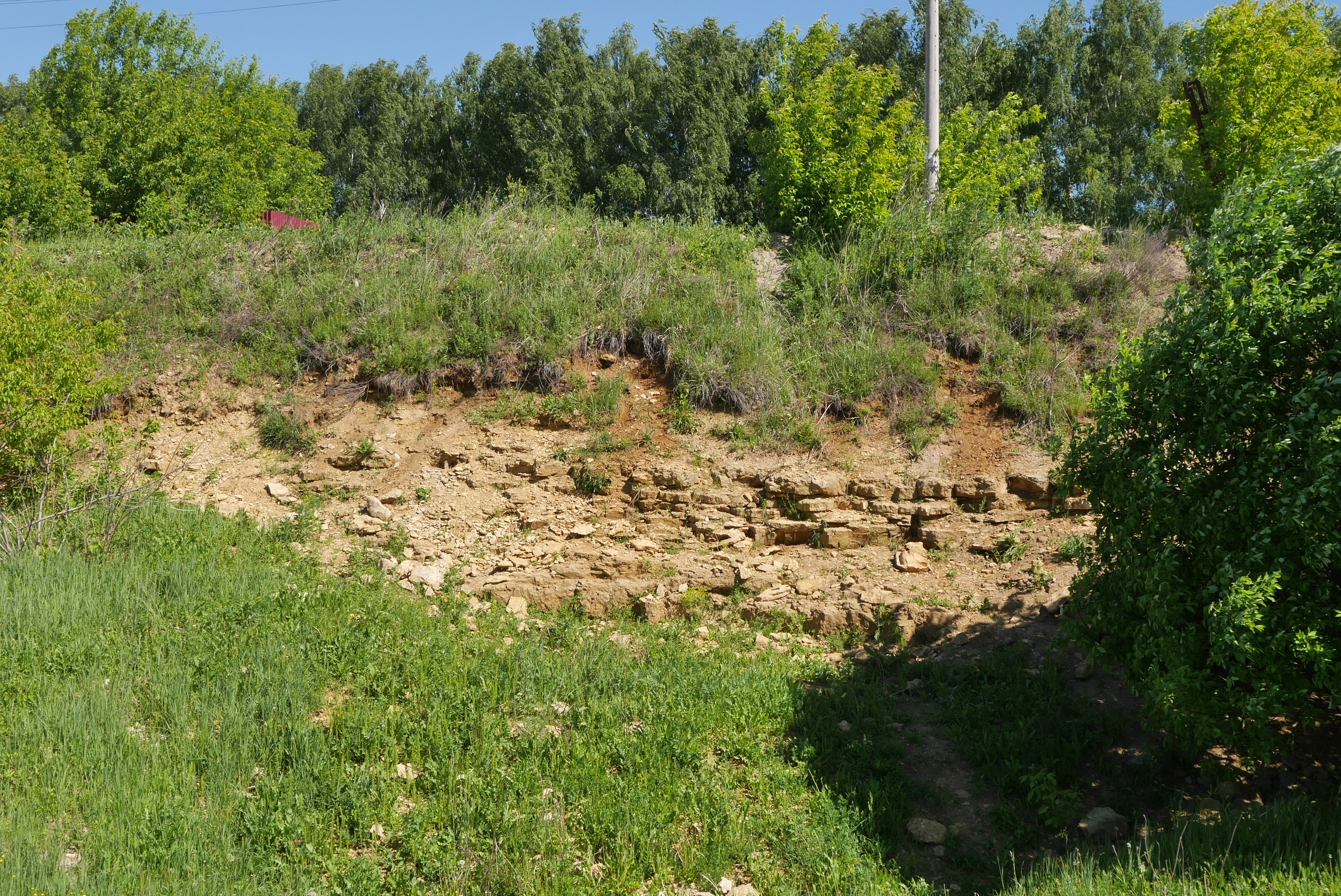
- Type locality for the Gzhelian in Gzhel, Russia

Chronology
← / Carboniferous Rainforest Collapse; ← / Mazon Creek Fossils; ← / End of Romer's Gap; ← / Start of Romer's Gap
Subdivision of the Carboniferous according to the ICS, as of 2023. Vertical axis scale: Millions of years ago

Etymology
- Name formality: Formal

Usage information
- Celestial body: Earth
- Regional usage: Global (ICS)
- Time scale(s) used: ICS Time Scale

Definition
- Chronological unit: Age
- Stratigraphic unit: Stage
- Time span formality: Formal
- Type section: Gzhel horizon, Gzhel, Moscow Oblast, Russia
- Lower boundary definition: Not formally defined
- Lower boundary definition candidates: FAD of the Conodont Idiognathodus simulator
- Lower boundary GSSP candidate section(s): Southern Ural Mountains; Nashui, Luodian County, Guizhou, China
- Upper boundary definition: FAD of the Conodont Streptognathodus isolatus within the morphotype Streptognathodus wabaunsensis chronocline
- Upper boundary GSSP: Aidaralash, Ural Mountains, Kazakhstan; 50.2458°N 57.8914°E
- Upper GSSP ratified: 1996

The Gzhelian (/ˈʒɛli.ən/ ZHELL-ee-ən) is an age in the ICS geologic time scale or a stage in the stratigraphic column. It is the youngest stage of the Pennsylvanian, the youngest subsystem of the Carboniferous. The Gzhelian lasted from 303.7 to 298.9 Ma. It follows the Kasimovian age/stage and is followed by the Asselian age/stage, the oldest subdivision of the Permian system.

The Gzhelian is more or less coeval with the Stephanian Stage of the regional stratigraphy of Europe.

== Name and definition ==
The Gzhelian is named after the Russian village of Gzhel (Russian: Гжель), nearby Ramenskoye, not far from Moscow. The name and type locality were defined by Sergei Nikitin (1851–1909) in 1890.

- Photogrammetry model of geology outcrop in Gzhel (2022)

The base of the Gzhelian is at the first appearance of the Fusulinida genera Daixina, Jigulites and Rugosofusulina, or at the first appearance of the conodont Streptognathodus zethus. The top of the stage (the base of the Permian system) is at the first appearance of the conodont Streptognathodus isolatus within the Streptognathus "wabaunsensis" chronocline. Six metres (20 ft) higher in the reference profile, the Fusulinida species Sphaeroschwagerina vulgaris aktjubensis appears.

Currently, a golden spike for the base of the Gzhelian Stage has not been allocated. A candidate is a section along the Ussolka river (a tributary of the Belaya river) at the edge of the hamlet of Krasnoussolsky, about 120 kilometres (75 mi) southeast of Ufa and 60 kilometres (37 mi) northeast of Sterlitamak (in Bashkortostan).

== Biozones ==
The Gzhelian Stage is subdivided into five biozones, based on the conodont genus Streptognathodus:

- Streptognathodus wabaunsensis and Streptognathodus bellus Zone
- Streptognathodus simplex Zone
- Streptognathodus virgilicus Zone
- Streptognathodus vitali Zone
- Streptognathodus simulator Zone
