= Gzhel (selo), Moscow Oblast =

Rural locality in Ramensky District, Moscow Oblast, Russia

Coordinates: 55°36′N 38°24′E

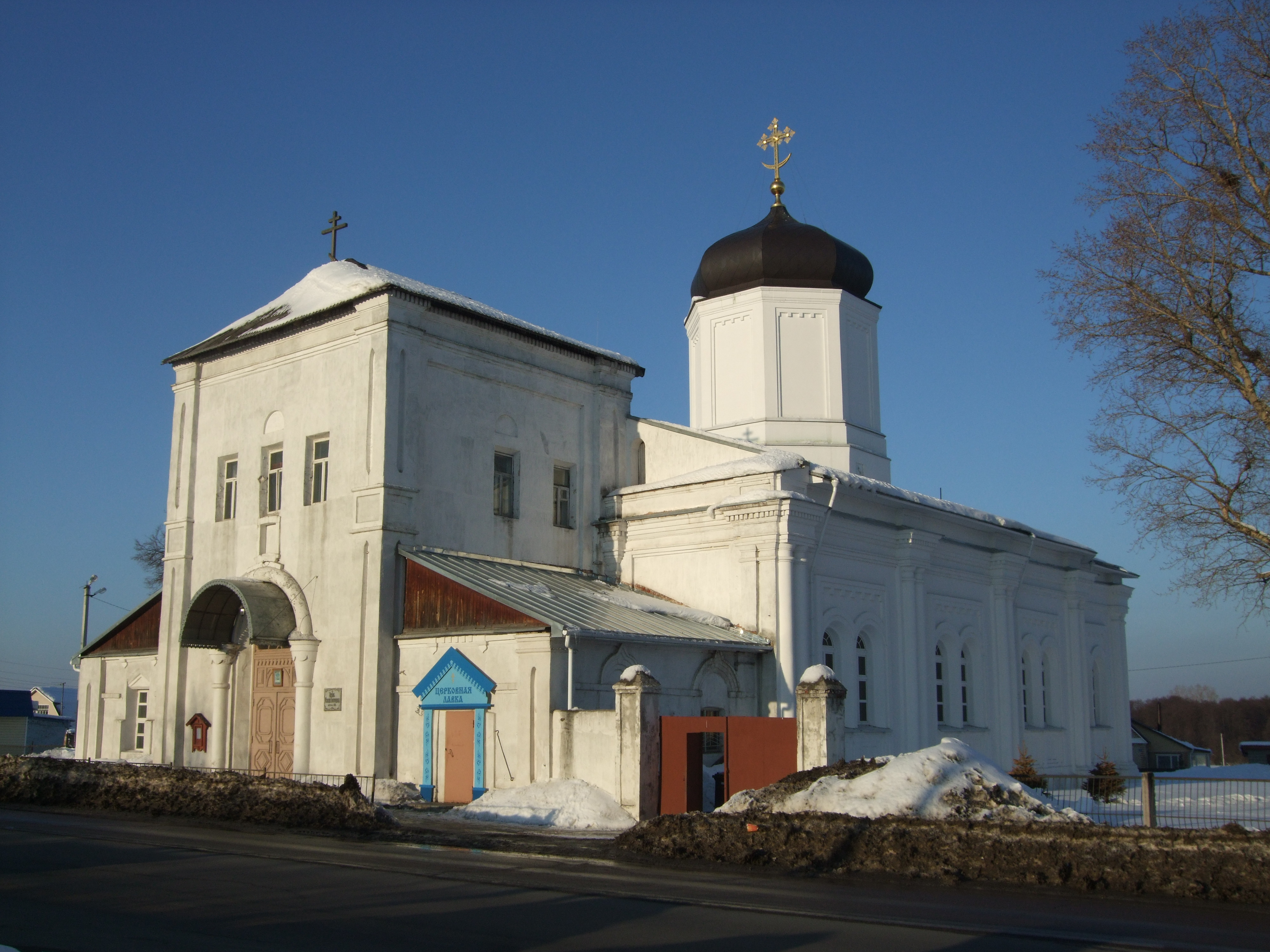
Gzhel Uspeniya Church, Gzhel Village, Russia

Gzhel (Russian: Гжель, IPA: [ɡʐelʲ]) is a rural locality (a selo) in Ramensky District of Moscow Oblast, Russia, located 52 kilometers (32 mi) southeast from the center of Moscow. As of the 2010 Census, its population was 1,006.

It gave its name to Gzhel ceramics as well as the Gzhelian age and stage in the ICS geologic time scale. In a broader sense, the name may also refer to a cluster of rural localities in the vicinity of Gzhel and Rechitsy. An eponymous railway station on the Moscow–Kazan line has been operating since 1912, and a different settlement also named Gzhel is located in the vicinity.

Gzhel stands on the banks of the Gzhelka River, known from the 1451 charter of Sophia of Lithuania, mother of Vasily II of Moscow, as Kzhelya. The year of Gzhel's foundation remains unknown, but it was first reliably documented in the 1784 population audit. Gzhel prospered in the end of 19th century; the 1871 population audit recorded eleven retail shops, fifteen pubs, five inns, and eighty-eight manufacturing shops. Farmland was scarce; most of the population made a living in ceramic trade or worked in Moscow. According to 1878 records, 952 local men and 177 women worked outside of Gzhel, yet the number of workers from other places was over 1,200, evenly balancing the equation. Unhealthy work environments promoted mass tuberculosis among locals and guest workers; in 1909, a privately funded free sanatorium for TB patients was built here.
