= Word Formation =

Ecosystem

- Stratigraphic range: Roadian-Wordian; ~272–265.1 Ma
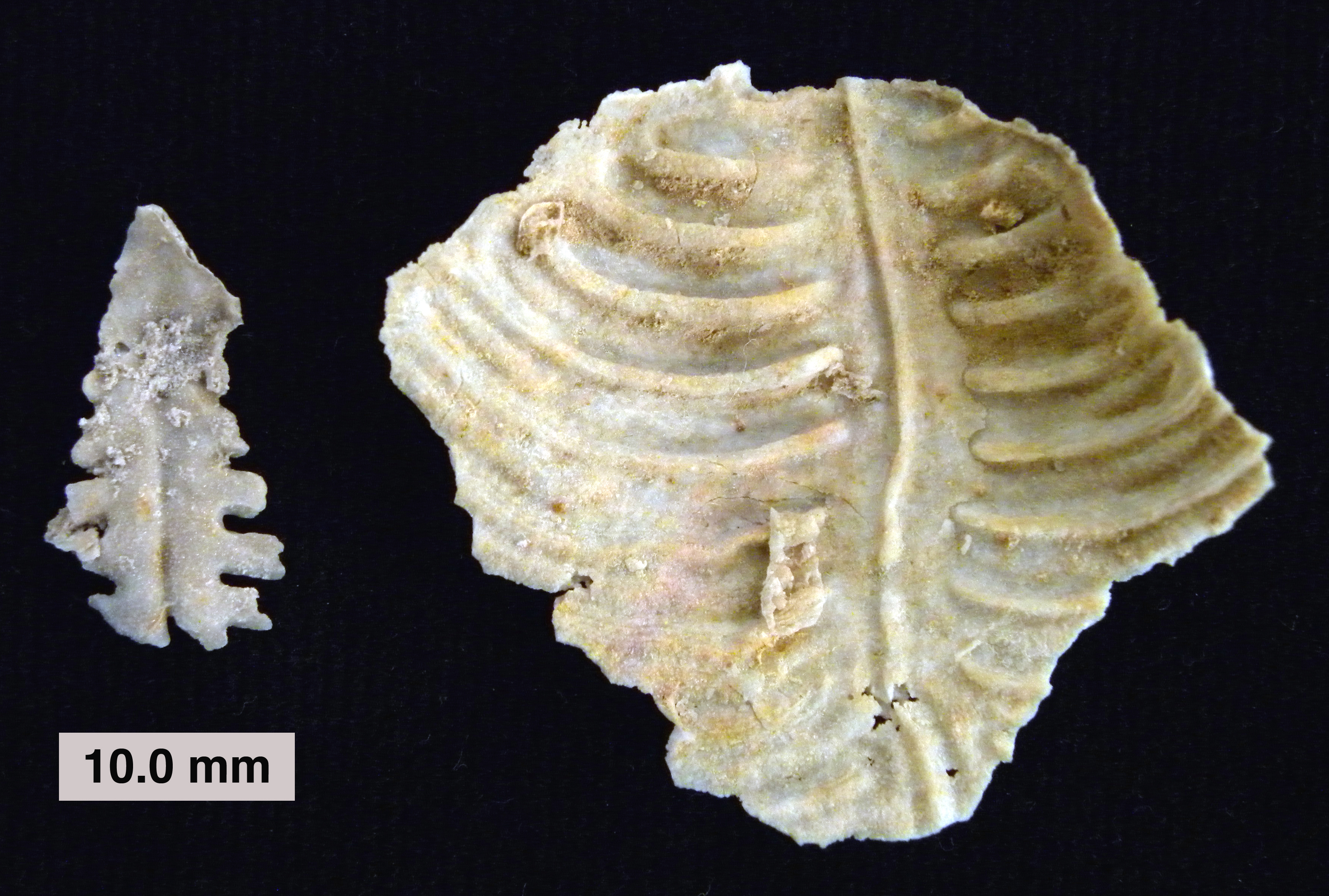
- Fossil from the Word Formation
- Type: Formation
- Sub-units: Appel Ranch, China Tank & Willis Ranch members
- Overlies: Road Canyon Formation

Lithology
- Primary: Limestone

Location
- Coordinates: 30.4°N 103.2°W
- Approximate paleocoordinates: 1.6°N 33.0°W
- Region: Texas
- Country: United States
- Extent: Glass Mountains

Type section
- Named for: Old Word Ranch
- Word Formation (the United States) Word Formation (Texas)

The Word Formation is a geologic formation in Texas. It preserves fossils dating back to the Permian period. It is probably named for the Old Word Ranch in the Glass Mountains of Brewster County.

== Defining formation ==
The Wordian age of the Permian Period is named for the Word Formation.

== Subdivisions ==
The formation is subdivided into three members, from young to old:

- Appel Ranch - Wordian
- China Tank - Roadian
- Willis Ranch - Roadian

== Fossil content ==
The limestone formation contains marine gastropods, brachiopods and ammonites.

=== Vertebrate paleofauna ===
- Helicoprion davisii

== See also ==
- List of fossiliferous stratigraphic units in Texas
- Paleontology in Texas
