= Streptognathodus =

Streptognathodus Temporal range: Kasimovian–Sakmarian

Scientific classification
- Kingdom: Animalia
- Phylum: Chordata
- Infraphylum: Agnatha
- Class: †Conodonta
- Order: †Ozarkodinida
- Family: †Polygnathidae
- Genus: †Streptognathodus; Stauffer & Plummer 1932

Species and subspecies
- †Streptognathodus acuminatus; †Streptognathodus barskovi; †Streptognathodus bellus; †Streptognathodus bitteri; †Streptognathodus brownvillensis; †Streptognathodus chanutensis; †Streptognathodus clarki; †Streptognathodus clavatulus; †Streptognathodus constrictus; †Streptognathodus corrugatus; †Streptognathodus curvatus; †Streptognathodus elongatus; †Streptognathodus excelsus; †Streptognathodus farmeri; †Streptognathodus flangulatus; †Streptognathodus fusus; †Streptognathodus holmesi; †Streptognathodus holtensis; †Streptognathodus isolatus; †Streptognathodus makhlinae; †Streptognathodus minutus; †Streptognathodus multinodosus; †Streptognathodus pawhuskaensis; †S. pawhuskaensis deflectus; †Streptognathodus postfusus; †Streptognathodus rugosus; †Streptognathodus ruidus; †Streptognathodus simplex; †Streptognathodus simulator; †Streptognathodus spatulatus; †Streptognathodus strigillatus; †Streptognathodus subdivisus; †Streptognathodus sulcatus; †Streptognathodus sulciferus; †Streptognathodus virgilicus; †Streptognathodus vitali; †Streptognathodus wabaunsensis; †Streptognathodus walteri; †Streptognathodus zethus

Extinct genus of jawless fishes

Streptognathodus is an extinct genus of conodonts from the Late Carboniferous to Early Permian.

== Use in stratigraphy ==
=== Late Carboniferous ===
The top of the Kasimovian stage is close to the first appearance of Streptognathodus zethus. The golden spike for the Kasimovian stage has not yet been assigned (in 2008).

The Kasimovian is subdivided into three conodont biozones:

- Idiognathodus toretzianus Zone
- Idiognathodus sagittatus Zone
- Streptognathodus excelsus and Streptognathodus makhlinae Zone

The base of the Gzhelian is at the first appearance of Streptognathodus zethus. The top of the stage (also the top base of the Silesian and the base of the Permian system) is at the first appearance of Streptognathodus isolatus within the Streptognathus "wabaunsensis" chronocline.

The Gzhelian stage is subdivided into five biozones, based on the conodont genus Streptognathodus:

- Streptognathodus wabaunsensis and Streptognathodus bellus Zone
- Streptognathodus simplex Zone
- Streptognathodus virgilicus Zone
- Streptognathodus vitali Zone
- Streptognathodus simulator Zone

=== Early Permian ===
The base of the Asselian stage is at the same time the base of the Cisuralian series and the Permian system. It is defined as the place in the stratigraphic record where fossils of the species Streptognathodus isolatus first appear. The global reference profile for the base (the GSSP or golden spike) is located in the valley of the Aidaralash River, near Aqtöbe in the Ural Mountains of Kazakhstan. The top of the Asselian stage (the base of the Sakmarian stage) is at the first appearance of the species Streptognathodus postfusus.

The Asselian contains five conodont biozones:

- zone of Streptognathodus barskovi
- zone of Streptognathodus postfusus
- zone of Streptognathodus fusus
- zone of Streptognathodus constrictus
- zone of Streptognathodus isolatus

The base of the Sakmarian stage is laid with the first appearance of Streptognathodus postfusus in the fossil record. A global reference profile for the base had in 2009 not yet been appointed. The top of the Sakmarian (the base of the Artinskian) is defined as the place in the stratigraphic record where fossils of conodont species Sweetognathus whitei and Mesogondolella bisselli first appear.
