= Gzhel =

Russian style of blue and white ceramics

Coordinates: 55°36′14″N 38°26′40″E

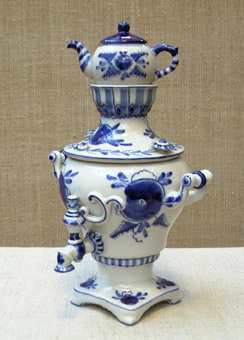
Gzhel samovar

Gzhel (Russian: Гжель, pronounced [ɡʐɛlʲ]) is a Russian style of blue and white ceramics which takes its name from the village of Gzhel and surrounding area, where it has been produced since 1802.

== Overview ==
About thirty villages located southeast of Moscow produce pottery and ship it throughout Russia. The name Gzhel became associated with pottery in the 14th century. Gzhel pottery was originally created by potters in their homes; however, fairly early on these potters started to organize into workshops to increase production. The workshops eventually became factories with pieces formed in moulds and potters being responsible for separate pieces, a specific style, or decoration. The earliest pieces were created of earthenware. The pottery was painted solid white with distinctive blue designs. Pottery was also produced using a tin based white glaze and coloured glaze designs in blue, green, yellow, and brown, rather than just blue on a white background, in a style that is referred to as Maiolica. The body colour of earthenware varies depending on the raw materials used, and can range in color from white to brown. It is generally fired at lower temperatures than either stoneware or porcelain, and can remain semi-permeable to water until glazed.

== Historical overview ==
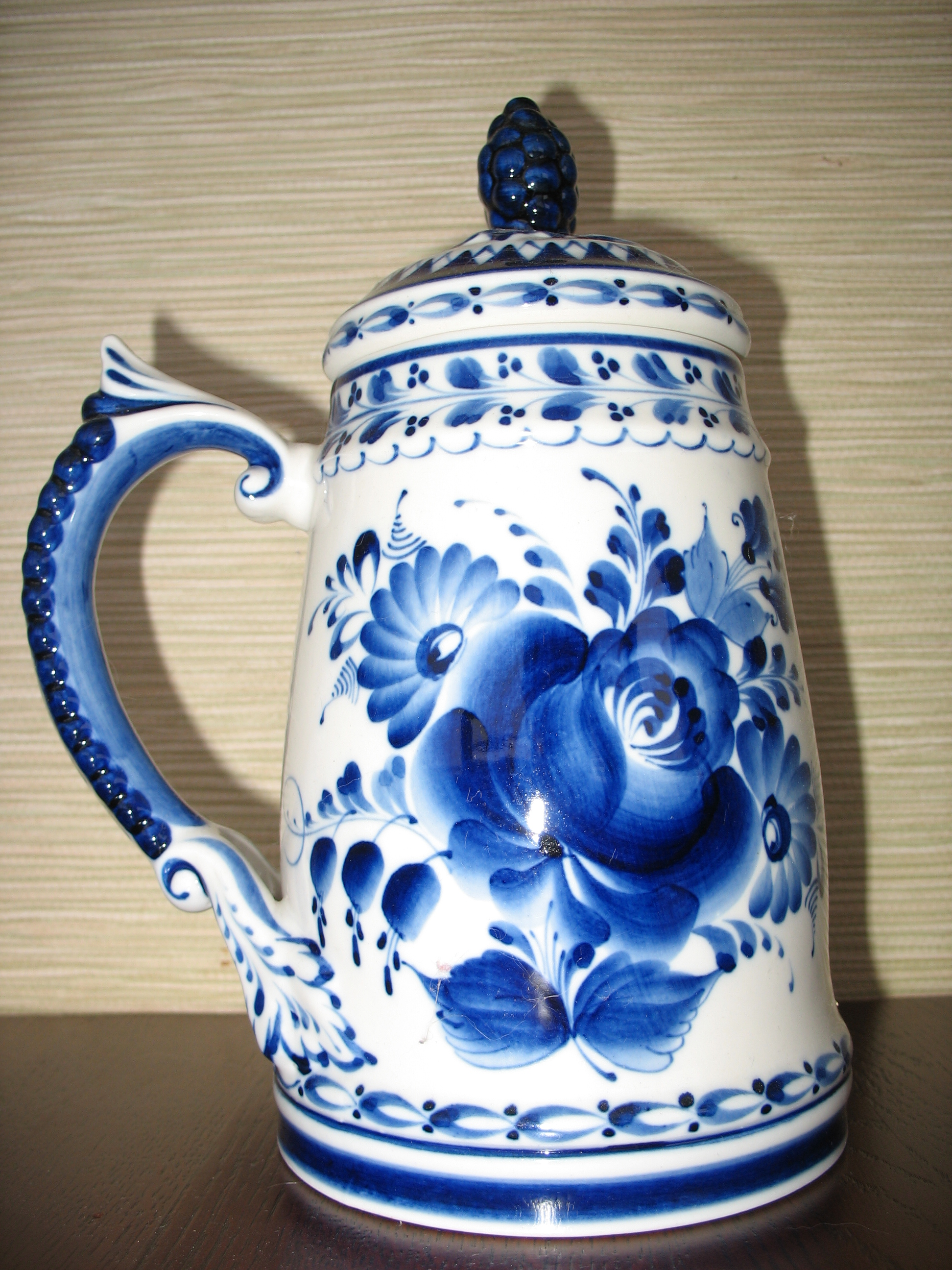
Container

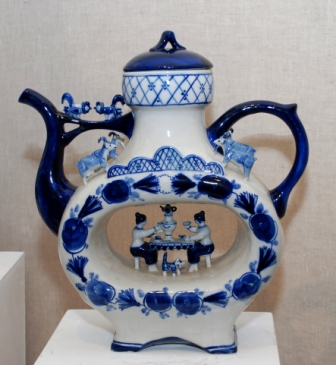
Tea pot

The village of Gzhel has long been famous for its clays. Extensive mining of various types of clay carried out here from the middle of the 17th century. In 1663, Tsar Alexey Mikhailovich (Alexis of Russia) issued a decree to make Gzhel "exclusive supplier of Apothecary and alchemical vessels for the Apothecary’s order in Moscow. They had to comply with increased quality requirements. This was the beginning of ceramic production in Russia."

In the 1830s, the Gzhel potters developed a faience, or white earthenware, of a quality that rivaled the creamware being produced in England at the time. They followed the development of faience with the acquisition of porcelain. Porcelain is fired to a similar temperature as stoneware, but unlike stoneware it becomes a translucent white and as such is highly desirable. The making of porcelain had been a secret heavily guarded by China with only finished products being exported. When Russia was able to produce their own porcelain, it undercut the high cost of imports from China or Western European producers. Although there have been several periods of disruption in pottery production at Gzhel, quality pottery is once again being produced in both the recognizable blue on white design as well as the more colorful Maiolica ware.

The second quarter of the 19th century is the period of the highest artistic achievements of Gzhel ceramic art in all its branches. In an effort to obtain fine earthenware and porcelain, the owners of production facilities constantly improved the composition of the white mass. Gzhel became a blacksmith's shop: many famous masters and creators of their own porcelain and faience factories started as simple workers in Gzhel. Since the middle of the 19th century, many Gzhel factories have fallen into disrepair. This was partly due to the volume of goods imported from abroad, and partly due to the modernization of production, which was not always kept up by manufacturers from Gzhel.

At the beginning of the 20th century, ceramic production was concentrated in the hands of the Kuznetsov dynasty, who once came from Gzhel. After the revolution, the Kuznetsov factories were nationalized. Gzhel began the restoration of its craft in the middle of the 20th century. In 1945–1949, the third stage of development of the Gzhel craft began. The use of cobalt paints on white clay was established. Master A. B. Saltykov created a special Atlas of brushstrokes to unify the style of products. The artist N. I. Bessarabova, who developed a new blue-and-white style of Gzhel products, was invited to the enterprise. In the 1930s and 1940s, there was nearly half of all porcelain and faience enterprises of Russia in Gzhel.

== Sources ==
- Dulkina, T.I. and N.S. Grigorevna, Gzhel: keramika 18-19 vekov. Moskva: Izd-vo "Planeta", 1982.
- Ovsyannikov, I. Russian Folk Arts and Crafts. Progress Publishers, Moscow, 1969.
- Saltykov, A. B., Russkaia narodnaia keramika. Moskva, Sovetskii khudozhnik, 1960.
