= Olson's Extinction =

Mass extinction 273 million years ago

Olson's Extinction is a hypothesised extinction event that is suggested to have occurred around 273 million years ago in the late Cisuralian or early Guadalupian epoch of the Permian period, predating the much larger Permian–Triassic extinction event. The event is named after American paleontologist Everett C. Olson, who first identified a sharp disjunction in the fossil record indicating a sudden change between the early Permian and middle/late Permian faunas which was hypothesised to represent a hiatus in the fossil record termed "Olson's Gap", though the nature, existence, and timing of the gap is contested. This event has been argued by some authors to have affected many taxa, including embryophytes, marine metazoans, and tetrapods.

The veracity of the extinction event has been disputed by a number of authors, who propose that it is an artifact of poor sampling and may conflate gradual change that occurred over a longer period of time.

== Identification ==
The first evidence of extinction came when Everett C. Olson noted a hiatus between early Permian faunas dominated by pelycosaurs and the middle and late Permian therapsid-dominated faunas. First considered to be a preservational gap in the fossil record, the event was originally dubbed 'Olson's Gap'. To compound the difficulty in identifying the cause of the 'gap', researchers were having difficulty in resolving the uncertainty which exists regarding the duration of the overall extinction and about the timing and duration of various groups' extinctions within the greater process. Theories emerged which suggested the extinction was prolonged, spread out over several million years or that multiple extinction pulses preceded the Permian–Triassic extinction event.

During the 1990s and 2000s researchers gathered evidence on the biodiversity of plants, marine organisms, and tetrapods that indicated an extinction pulse preceding the Permian–Triassic extinction event had a profound impact on life on land. On land, Sahney and Benton showed that even discounting the sparse fossil assemblages from the extinction period, the event can be confirmed by the stages of time bracketing the event, since well-preserved sections of the fossil record from both before and after the event have been found and they referred to the event as 'Olson's Extinction'. The 'Gap' was finally closed in 2012 when Michael Benton confirmed that the terrestrial fossil record of the Middle Permian is well-represented by fossil localities in the Southwestern United States and European Russia and that the gap is not an artifact of a poor rock record since there is no correlation between geological and biological records of the Middle Permian.

Despite the closure of Olson's Gap, the presence of an extinction event at the Kungurian–Roadian boundary was still disputed. It was argued that the observed decrease in diversity might be due to the shift in the location of greatest sample size from the palaeo-equatorial to the palaeo-temperate regions: equatorial regions tend to have a higher diversity in most modern groups. However, a thorough review of the tetrapod-bearing formations during the Kungurian and the Roadian found evidence that the faunal turnover at this time is not a result of the shift in sampling locality; the early Permian temperate faunas are more similar to the early Permian equatorial faunas than the middle Permian temperate faunas. It was also shown that throughout the Permian, the highest diversity was found in temperate regions rather than equatorial regions, and therefore the fall in diversity could not be due to increased sampling of temperate latitudes.

== Possible causes ==
There is no widely accepted theory for the cause of Olson's Extinction. Recent research has indicated that climate change may be a possible cause: extreme environments were observed from the Permian of Kansas which resulted from a combination of hot climate and acidic waters particularly coincident with Olson's Extinction.

== Extinction patterns ==
=== On land ===
==== Plants ====
Plants showed large turnover in the mid-to-late Permian and into the Triassic. The duration of higher extinction rates (>60%) in land plants was about 23.4 million years, starting from Olson's Extinction and into the early Middle Triassic. Olson's Extinction represents the third-highest peak of extinction rates seen in plants throughout the Paleozoic, and the number of genera fell by 25%. The extinction was particularly severe among free-sporing plants; seed plants seem to have been largely unaffected.

==== Tetrapods ====
The Permian was a time of rapid change for tetrapods; in particular there was a major changeover from faunas dominated by basal synapsids ("pelycosaurs") and reptiliomorphs (Diadectes) to faunas dominated by therapsids (Dinocephalia, Anomodontia, Gorgonopsia, and Cynodontia); the cynodonts were direct ancestors of mammals. In 2008 Sahney and Benton confirmed that this was not just a turnover (gradual replacement of one faunal complex by another) but a real extinction event in which a significant drop in the biodiversity of tetrapods on a global scale and community level occurred. The extinction may have taken place in two phases: Edaphosauridae and Ophiacodontidae died out around the Kungurian–Roadian boundary, while Caseidae and Therapsida diversified; later in the Roadian or slightly later Sphenacodontidae died out, although this was apparently the result of a slow decline over 20 million years, which spanned from the Sakmarian through the Kungurian, and Caseidae also went into decline, over an even longer period. Olson's Extinction appears to have been the highest Paleozoic peak in extinction rate observed in Eureptilia, exceeding even the Permian–Triassic mass extinction. Temnospondyls were also particularly hard-hit.

In December 2011, the fossilized remains of the 'youngest' pelycosaur was described by Modesto et al. as from 260 million years ago in South Africa. This, and slightly older remains of varanopids, documents the fact that this clade, like some caseids, survived Olson's Extinction. This type of animal is called a disaster taxon, an organism that survives a major environmental disruption, perhaps forming the basis for a new adaptive radiation.

=== In the water ===
==== Fish ====
Extinction rates in fish increased noticeably between the Cisuralian and the Guadalupian, the time of Olson's Extinction. However, origination rates also rose, and so there does not appear to have been any substantial decrease in species richness. Using data on chondrichthyan diversity, Koot showed that there was little substantial decline in diversity until the middle of the Guadalupian.

== Recovery ==
Fauna did not recover fully from Olson's Extinction before the impact of the Permian-Triassic extinction event. Estimates of recovery time vary, where some authors indicated recovery was prolonged, lasting 30 million years into the Triassic.

Several important events took place during Olson's Extinction, most notably the rise of therapsids, a group of sphenacodontoid synapsids that includes the evolutionary ancestors of mammals. Further research on the recently identified primitive therapsid of the Xidagou Formation (Dashankou locality) in China of Roadian age may provide more information on this topic.
