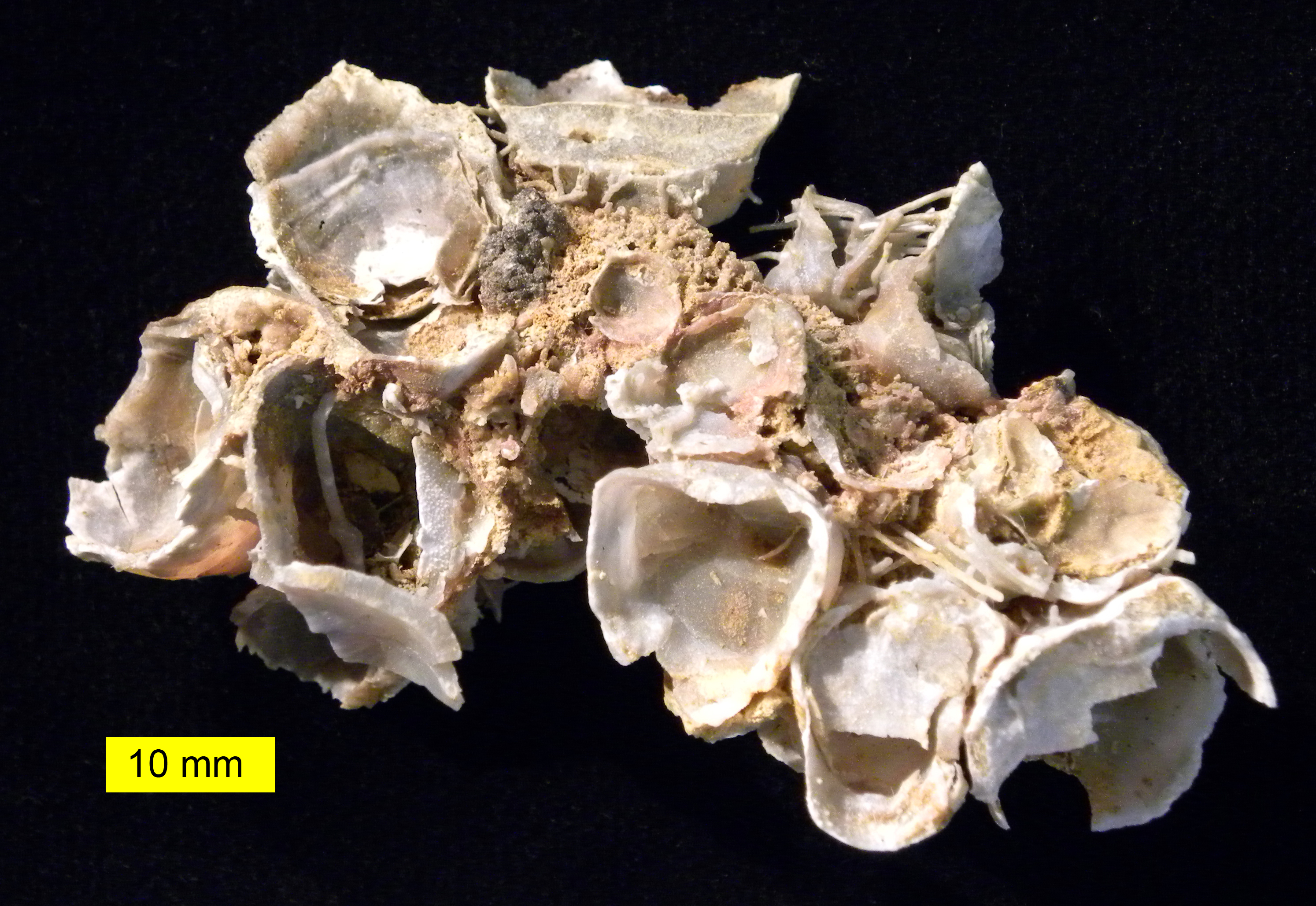
- Hercosestria cribrosa (multiple individuals)

Scientific classification
- Kingdom: Animalia
- Phylum: Brachiopoda
- Class: †Strophomenata
- Order: †Productida
- Family: †Hercosiidae
- Genus: †Hercosestria; Cooper & Grant, 1969

Species
- Hercosestria cribrosa Cooper and Grant, 1969 type; Hercosestria laevis Cooper and Grant, 1975; Hercosestria notialis Stehli and Grant, 1970

= Hercosestria =

Hercosestria Temporal range: Kungurian-Roadian

Extinct genus of brachiopods

Hercosestria is an extinct genus of brachiopods from the Lower and Middle Permian. They were important reef-forming organisms because of their conical shapes, attaching spines, and gregarious habits. It is related to Richthofenia. Species of the genus have been found in Texas (H. cribrosa and H. laevis) and Guatemala (H. notialis).
