= Sakmarian =

Second stage of the Permian

- 293.52 ± 0.17 – 290.1 ± 0.26 Ma

Chronology
← / Permian-Triassic mass extinction event; ← / end-Capitanian extinction event; ← / Olson's Extinction
Subdivision of the Permian according to the ICS, as of 2023. Vertical axis scale: Millions of years ago

Etymology
- Name formality: Formal

Usage information
- Celestial body: Earth
- Regional usage: Global (ICS)
- Time scale(s) used: ICS Time Scale

Definition
- Chronological unit: Age
- Stratigraphic unit: Stage
- Time span formality: Formal
- Lower boundary definition: FAD of the Conodont Mesogondolella monstra
- Lower boundary GSSP: Usolka section, Southern Ural Mountains, Russia; 53.9247°N 56.7287°E
- Lower GSSP ratified: 2018
- Upper boundary definition: FAD of the Conodont Sweetognathus whitei
- Upper boundary GSSP: Dalny Tulkas section, Southern Ural Mountains, Russia; 53.9247°N 56.51615°E
- Upper GSSP ratified: February 2022

In the geologic timescale, the Sakmarian is an age or stage of the Permian period. It is a subdivision of the Cisuralian Epoch or Series. The Sakmarian lasted between 293.52 and 290.1 million years ago (Ma). It was preceded by the Asselian and followed by the Artinskian.

== Stratigraphy ==
The Sakmarian Stage is named after the Sakmara River in the Ural Mountains, a tributary of the Ural River. The stage was introduced into scientific literature by Alexander Karpinsky in 1874. In Russian stratigraphy, it originally formed a substage of the Artinskian Stage. Currently, the ICS (International Commission on Stratigraphy) uses it as an independent stage in its international geologic timescale.

The base of the Sakmarian Stage is defined by the first appearance of conodont species Streptognathodus postfusus in the fossil record. A global reference profile for the stage's base (a GSSP), located in the southern Ural Mountains, Russia, was ratified in 2018. The top of the Sakmarian (the base of the Artinskian) is defined as the level in the stratigraphic record where fossils of conodont species Sweetognathus whitei and Mesogondolella bisselli first appear.
