= Mesogondolella =

Mesogondolella Temporal range: Permian

Scientific classification
- Kingdom: Animalia
- Phylum: Chordata
- Infraphylum: Agnatha
- Class: †Conodonta
- Order: †Ozarkodinida
- Family: †Gondolellidae
- Genus: †Mesogondolella; Kozur 1989

Species
- †Mesogondolella aserrata; †Mesogondolella bisselli; †Mesogondolella daheshenensis; †Mesogondolella hendersoni; †Mesogondolella siciliensis; †Mesogondolella subgracilis

Genus of conodonts

Mesogondolella is an extinct genus of conodonts.

The species M. daheshenensis and M. subgracilis are from the Permian (probably Wordian) of the Daheshen Formation in China.

The top of the Sakmarian stage (the base of the Artinskian) is defined as the place in the stratigraphic record where fossils of conodont species Sweetognathus whitei and Mesogondolella bisselli first appear.
