= Aidaralash =

Creek located in the Aktobe region of Ural Mountains

Aidaralash is a creek located in the Aktobe region of the Ural Mountains. The Global Boundary Stratotype Section and Point (GSSP) for Carboniferous-Permian boundary and base for the Asselian period is located here.
