= Drydenius =

Drydenius Temporal range: Serpukhovian to Bashkirian

Scientific classification
- Kingdom: Animalia
- Phylum: Chordata
- Class: Actinopterygii
- Order: †Palaeonisciformes (?)
- Family: †Gonatodidae
- Genus: †Drydenius; Traquair, 1890

Species
- †D. insignis Traquair, 1890; †D. molyneuxi (Traquair, 1888)

Extinct genus of ray-finned fishes

Drydenius is an extinct genus of marine ray-finned fish known from the early-mid Carboniferous of the United Kingdom. It is one of a number of early fish genera long placed in the likely paraphyletic order Palaeonisciformes, potentially within the family Gonatodidae.

It contains the following species:

- D. insignis Traquair, 1890 - Serpukhovian of Scotland (Limestone Coal Formation)
- D. molyneuxi (Traquair, 1888) (type species) - Late Bashkirian (Westphalian) of England and Wales (Pennine Coal Measures) (=Gonatodus molyneuxi Traquair, 1888)
