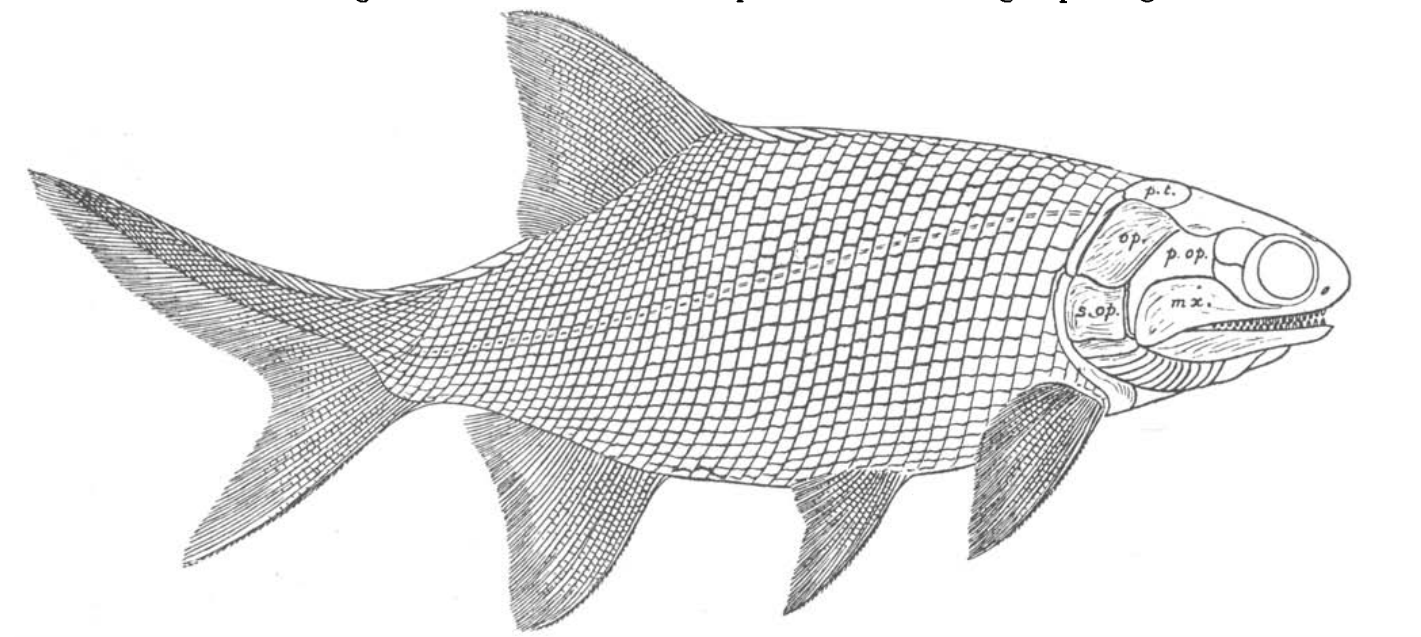
- Life restoration of G. punctatus

Scientific classification
- Kingdom: Animalia
- Phylum: Chordata
- Class: Actinopterygii
- Order: †Palaeonisciformes (?)
- Family: †Gonatodidae
- Genus: †Gonatodus; Traquair, 1877

Species
- See text

= Gonatodus =

Gonatodus Temporal range: Visean

Extinct genus of ray-finned fishes

Gonatodus is an extinct genus of freshwater ray-finned fish that lived in Europe during the Viséan stage of the Mississippian epoch. It is a member of the potentially paraphyletic family Gonatodidae.

The following species are known:

- †G. punctatus (Agassiz, 1835) (type species) - Visean of Scotland (Strathclyde Group, including Gullane Formation) (=Amblypterus punctatus Agassiz, 1835)
- †G. macrolepis Traquair, 1877 - Visean of Scotland (Limestone Coal Formation)
- †G. parvidens Traquair, 1882 - Visean of Scotland (Limestone Coal Formation)
- ?†G. toilliezi de Koninck, 1878 - (Visean of Belgium)

The alleged species G. brainerdi Newberry, 1889 is known from the Famennian of Ohio, US. However, it is almost certainly not a member of this genus.

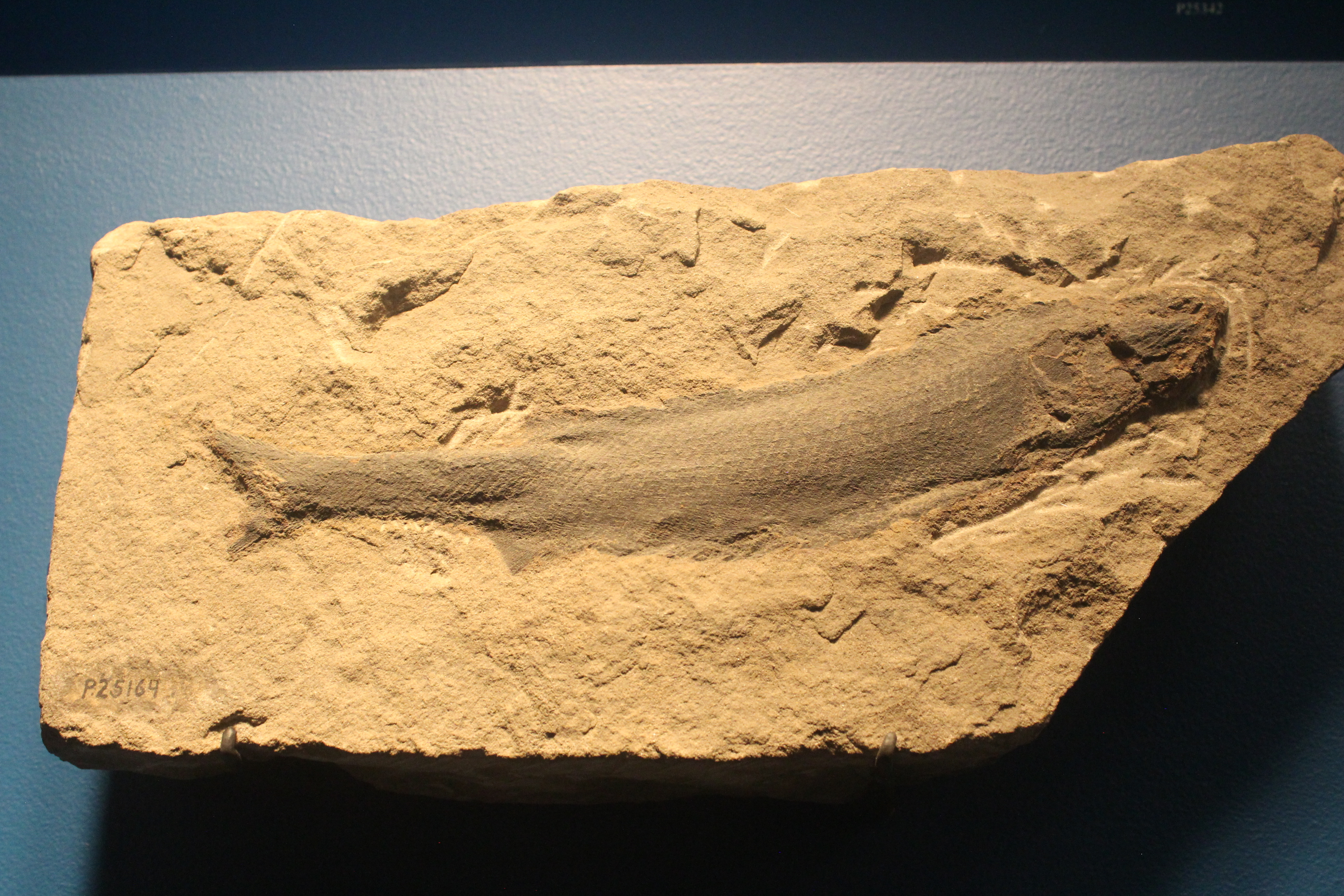
Fossil of "Gonatodus" brainerdi in the Field Museum of Natural History.
