= Furse Argillaceous Beds =

- Stratigraphic range: Devonian
- Type: Formation

Location
- Region: Scotland
- Country: United Kingdom

The Furse Argillaceous Beds is a geological formation in Scotland. It preserves fossils dating back to the Devonian period.

== See also ==
- List of fossiliferous stratigraphic units in Scotland
