= Waterhead =

Waterhead may refer to more than one place in England:

- Waterhead, Cumberland, a civil parish in North Cumbria
- Waterhead, Greater Manchester, a district of Oldham
- Waterhead, Westmorland and Furness, part of Ambleside, Cumbria, with pier on Windermere

== See also ==
- Headwater
- Waterhead Group, geological formation in Scotland
