= Andrew Cunningham Scott =

British geologist (born 1952)

- Born: 16 February 1952
- Education: Bedford College, London (BSc); Birkbeck College (PhD)
- Spouse: Anne
- Children: 2
- Scientific career
- Fields: Geology
- Workplaces: Royal Holloway University; University of London
- Thesis: Environmental Control of Westphalian Plant Assemblages from Northern Britain (1976)
- Doctoral advisor: William Gilbert Chaloner

Andrew Cunningham Scott (born 16 February 1952) is a British geologist, and professor emeritus at Royal Holloway University of London. He won the 2007 Gilbert H. Cady Award from the Geological Society of America for outstanding contributions to coal geology. He is widely regarded an expert on wildfire and charcoal and has highlighted the role of fire in deep time. He also contributes as a palaeobotanist and science communicator.

Scott was educated at Cannon Lane Primary School, (Pinner); St. Martins School, Northwood; Merchant Taylors' School, Northwood; and the University of London, where he obtained a BSc (Bedford College) and a PhD (Birkbeck College) studying under William Gilbert Chaloner. His thesis concerned the palaeoecology of Carboniferous Coal Measure plants. After a 2-year post-doctoral fellowship at Trinity College Dublin, he returned to England to take up a lectureship in Geology at Chelsea College, University of London. During this period, his research concentrated on the Lower Carboniferous (Mississippian) floras of Scotland including those from the Pettycur Volcanics, Bearsden (associated with the Bearsden Shark collected by Stan Wood), Oxroad Bay and localities in Berwickshire and East Lothian as well as the East Kirkton Quarry (associated with famous fossil vertebrates including Westlothiana).

In 1985, the geology departments at Chelsea College and Bedford College merged to form a new department at Royal Holloway, University of London. He was awarded a personal chair in 1996, becoming Professor of Applied Palaeobotany. During the 1990s, he worked on Drawings and Prints in the Royal Library that had been collected by Cassiano dal Pozzo. These were part of a project undertaken by Federico Cesi and Francesco Stelluti, founders of the Accademia dei Lincei. His book on the drawing of fossil woods was launched by Charles, Prince of Wales at Windsor Castle in 2001

From 1998 to 2006, he was the Director of Science Communication. In 2002 he was awarded a D.Sc. from the University of London for his published research. In 2003, he was made an Honorary Professor at Jilin University, Changchun, China. He was a visiting professor at Yale University in 2006–2007 and a visiting fellow at Berkeley College. During this period, his research concentrated on the occurrence of wildfire in deep time. He also became involved with the Pyrogeography research group at the University of California, Santa Barbara and published several important papers and a text-book on Fire on Earth. In 2012 he became a distinguished research fellow and was awarded a Leverhulme Fellowship and became the emeritus Professor of Geology in 2014. He was appointed Distinguished Research Professor in 2023.

Scott has been involved in many radio broadcasts for broadcasters around the world including the BBC, such as In Our Time episodes on Early Geology and Catastrophism and on the Forum on “Fire: How climate change is altering our attitudes to wildfire" and was also the subject of a BBC documentary about his research on coal for screenhouse productions and the Open University. He has written articles on geology stamps for several publications including Stamp Magazine and has had a long-term collaboration with the artist Nick Shrewing working on geological stamp designs for a number of countries including the Solomon Islands, Barbados, Ascension Island and Tristan da Cunha.

In 2022 his fire research was featured in a major exhibition in Tokyo in the Museum of Science and Nature ( https://www.kahaku.go.jp/english/event/2022/11wildfire/ ). He has been involved in two papers from the Parliamentary Office of Science and Technology (POSTnotes 603 (2019) Climate change and UK Wildfire ( https://post.parliament.uk/research-briefings/post-pn-0603/ ), POSTnote 717 (2024) Wildfire risks to UK landscapes ( https://researchbriefings.files.parliament.uk/documents/POST-PN-0717/POST-PN- 0717.pdf ). He has collaborated on the use of plants, minerals and burnt substances in Medieval medicine funded by the Wellcome Trust ( https://wellcome.org/research-funding/funding-portfolio/funded-grants/plants-and-minerals-byzantine-popular-pharmacy-new ).

He has published on family history and on the history of the Scottish Village of Lemahagow.

Scott is the recipient of several awards including the Presidents Award of the Geological Society of London and the Palaeontological Society and the Gilbert H. Cady Award from the Geological Society of America, and in 2025 the Richardson Award from the Geologists Association. He is also a Fellow of the Geological Society of London, Fellow of the Geological Society of America, Fellow of the Royal Society of Arts, Fellow of the Higher Education Academy and is a Chartered Geologist.

== Personal life ==
He is married to his wife Anne and has a son and a daughter.

== Selected publications ==
=== Books ===
- Scott, A. C. 1987. Coal and coal-bearing strata: Recent advances. (http://sp.lyellcollection.org/content/32/1) Geological Society of London Special Publication 32. (Editor).
- Collinson, M.E. and Scott, A.C. (Eds) 1993. Studies in Palaeobotany and Palynology in Honour of Professor W.G. Chaloner F.R.S. Special Papers in Palaeontology 49,1–187. ( http://www.palass.org/beta/eps/shop/product/pid-82/)
- Scott, A.C. and Fleet, A.J. (Eds) 1994. Coal and Coal-bearing strata as oil prone source rocks? Geological Society of London, Special Publication 77. 213pp. ( http://sp.lyellcollection.org/content/77/1)
- Blundell, D.J. and Scott, A.C. (eds) 1998. Lyell: The Past is the Key to the Present. Geological Society Special Publication 143, 376pp. ( http://sp.lyellcollection.org/content/143/1)
- Scott, A.C. and Freedberg, D. 2000. The Paper Museum of Cassiano dal Pozzo: A Catalogue Raisonné.Series B. Part III. Fossil woods and other geological specimens. Harvey Miller Publishers, London. 427pp. ( https://www.amazon.com/Fossil-Geological-Specimens-MUSEUM-CASSIANO/dp/1872501915)
- Scott, A.C., Bowman, D.J.M.S., Bond, W.J., Pyne, S.J. and Alexander M. 2014. Fire on Earth: An Introduction. (http://eu.wiley.com/WileyCDA/WileyTitle/productCd-111995357X.html ) J. Wiley and Sons. 413pp.
- Scott, A.C., Chaloner, W.G., Belcher, C.M., Roos, C.I. (Eds) 2016. The interaction of fire and mankind: Phil. Trans. R. Soc. B. volume 371, Issue 1696 252pp.
- Scott, A.C., Crane, P.R. 2018.The life and work of William G. C haloner FRS 1928–2016. Oak Spring Garden Foundation, Upperville, Virginia, USA, 75 p. ISBN 978-0-692-16727-4
- Scott, A.C. 2018. Burning Planet. The story of fire through time. Oxford University Press. 224 pp. ISBN 978-0-19-873484-0 also in Spanish and Japanese)
- Scott, A.C. 2020. At the crossroads of time - how a small Scottish Village changed history. Amberley Press, Stroud, Gloucestershire. 256pp. ISBN 978-1445698328
- Scott, A.C. 2020. Fire: A very Short Introduction. Oxford University Press. 156pp ISBN 978-0198734840 (also in Chinese)

=== Scientific Papers ===
- Scott A (1974). "The earliest conifer". Nature. 251 (5477): 707–8. Bibcode:1974Natur.251..707S. doi:10.1038/251707a0. S2CID 4264213.
- Scott A.C. (1978). "Sedimentological and ecological control of Westphalian B plant assemblages from West Yorkshire". Proceedings of the Yorkshire Geological Society. 41 (4): 461–508. Bibcode:1978PYGS...41..461S. doi:10.1144/pygs.41.4.461.
- Scott A.C.; Taylor T. N. (1983). "Plant/animal interactions during the Upper Carboniferous". Botanical Review. 49 (3): 259–307. Bibcode:1983BotRv..49..259S. doi:10.1007/BF02861089. S2CID 34091045.
- Scott A. C.; Galtier J.; Clayton G. (1984). "Distribution of anatomically preserved floras in the Lower Carboniferous in Western Europe". Transactions of the Royal Society of Edinburgh: Earth Sciences. 75 (3): 311–340. doi:10.1017/s026359330001395x. S2CID 130165791.
- Scott A.C. (1989). "Observations on the nature and origin of fusain". International Journal of Coal Geology. 12 (1–4): 443–475. Bibcode:1989IJCG...12..443S. doi:10.1016/0166-5162(89)90061-X.
- Jones T.P.; Scott A.C.; Cope M. (1991). "Reflectance measurements and the temperature of formation of modern charcoals and implications for the studies of fusain". Bull. Géol. Soc. France. 162: 193–200.
- Stankiewicz B.A.; Scott A.C.; Collinson M.E.; Finch P.; Mösle B.; Briggs D.E.G.; Evershed R.P. (1998). "Molecular taphonomy of arthropod and plant cuticles from the Carboniferous of North America: implications for the origin of kerogen". Journal of the Geological Society, London. 155 (3): 453–462. Bibcode:1998JGSoc.155..453S. doi:10.1144/gsjgs.155.3.0453. S2CID 140592914.
- Scott A.C. (2000). "The Pre-Quaternary History of Fire". Palaeogeography, Palaeoclimatology, Palaeoecology. 164 (1–4): 281–329. Bibcode:2000PPP...164..281S. doi:10.1016/S0031-0182(00)00192-9.
- Scott, A.C.2000. Art and the Earth sciences. pp. 38–43. In: Hancock, P.L. and Skinner, B.J (eds). The Oxford Companion to the Earth. Oxford University Press, Oxford. http://www.oxfordreference.com/view/10.1093/acref/9780198540397.001.0001/acref-9780198540397-e-37?rskey=wRv7A3&result=37
- Scott, A.C. 2000. Palaeobotany. p. 774. In: Hancock, P.L. and Skinner, B.J (eds). The Oxford Companion to the Earth. Oxford University Press, Oxford. http://www.oxfordreference.com/view/10.1093/acref/9780198540397.001.0001/acref-9780198540397-e-661?rskey=okw9tr&result=661
- Scott, A.C. 2000. Fossil plants. pp. 364–371. In: Hancock, P.L. and Skinner, B.J. (eds). The Oxford Companion to the Earth. Oxford University Press, Oxford. http://www.oxfordreference.com/view/10.1093/acref/9780198540397.001.0001/acref-9780198540397-e-313?rskey=tBNiRt&result=313
- Scott A.C. (2002). "Coal petrology and the origin of coal macerals: a way ahead?". International Journal of Coal Geology. 50 (1–4): 119–134. Bibcode:2002IJCG...50..119S. doi:10.1016/S0166-5162(02)00116-7.
- Scott A.C.; Glasspool I.J. (2005). "Charcoal reflectance as a proxy for the emplacement temperature of pyroclastic flow deposits". Geology. 33 (7): 589–592. Bibcode:2005Geo....33..589S. doi:10.1130/g21474.1.
- Scott A.C.; Glasspool I.J. (2006). "The diversification of Paleozoic fire systems and fluctuations in atmospheric oxygen concentration". Proceedings of the National Academy of Sciences, USA. 103 (29): 10861–10865. Bibcode:2006PNAS..10310861S. doi:10.1073/pnas.0604090103. PMC 1544139. PMID 16832054.
- Scott A.C.; Glasspool I.J. (2007). "Observations and experiments on the origin and formation of inertinite group macerals". International Journal of Coal Geology. 70 (1–3): 53–66. Bibcode:2007IJCG...70...53S. doi:10.1016/j.coal.2006.02.009.
- Scott A.C.; Galtier J.; Gostling N.J.; Smith S.Y.; Collinson M.E.; Stampanoni M.; Marone F.; Donoghue P.C.J.; Bengtson S. (2009). "Scanning Electron Microscopy and Synchrotron Radiation X-Ray Tomographic Microscopy of 330 million year old charcoalified seed fern fertile organs" (PDF). Microscopy and Microanalysis. 15 (2): 166–173. Bibcode:2009MiMic..15..166S. doi:10.1017/s1431927609090126. hdl:20.500.11850/158000. PMID 19284898. S2CID 24571335.
- McParland L.C.; Collinson M.E.; Scott A.C.; Campbell G. (2009). "The use of reflectance values for the interpretation of natural and anthropogenic charcoal assemblages". Archaeological and Anthropological Sciences. 1 (4): 249–261. Bibcode:2009ArAnS...1..249M. doi:10.1007/s12520-009-0018-z.
- Bowman D.M.J.S., Balch J.K.; Artaxo P., Bond W.J.; Carlson J.M., Cochrane M.A.; D'Antonio C.M., DeFries R.S.; Doyle J.C., Harrison; Johnston F.H., Keeley J.E.; Krawchuk M.A., Kull C.A.; Marston J.B., Moritz M.A.; Prentice I.C., Roos C.I.; Scott A.C., Swetnam T.W.; van der Werf G. R., Pyne S.J. (2009). "Fire in the Earth System". Science. 324 (5926): 481–484. Bibcode:2009Sci...324..481B. doi:10.1126/science.1163886. PMID 19390038. S2CID 22389421.
- Scott A.C. (2010). "Charcoal recognition, taphonomy and uses in palaeoenvironmental analysis". Palaeogeography, Palaeoclimatology, Palaeoecology. 291 (1–2): 11–39. Bibcode:2010PPP...291...11S. doi:10.1016/j.palaeo.2009.12.012.
- Glasspool I.J.; Scott A.C. (2010). "Phanerozoic concentrations of atmospheric oxygen reconstructed from sedimentary charcoal". Nature Geoscience. 3 (9): 627–630. Bibcode:2010NatGe...3..627G. doi:10.1038/ngeo923.
- Bond W.J.; Scott A.C. (2010). "Fire and the spread of flowering plants in the Cretaceous". New Phytologist. 118 (4): 1137–1150. Bibcode:2010NewPh.188.1137B. doi:10.1111/j.1469-8137.2010.03418.x. PMID 20819174. S2CID 28214392.
- Bowman D.J.M.S.; Balch J.; Artaxo P.; Bond W.J.; Cochrane M.A.; D'Antonio C.M.; DeFries R.; Johnston F.H.; Keeley J.E.; Krawchuk M.A.; Kull C.A.; Mack M.; Moritz M.A.; Pyne S.J.; Roos C.I.; Scott A.C.; Sodhi N.S.; Swetnam T.W. (2011). "The human dimension of fire regimes on Earth". Journal of Biogeography. 38 (12): 2223–2236. Bibcode:2011JBiog..38.2223B. doi:10.1111/j.1365-2699.2011.02595.x. PMC 3263421. PMID 22279247.
- Brown S.A.E.; Scott A.C.; Glasspool I.J.; Collinson M.E. (2012). "Cretaceous wildfires and their impact on the Earth system". Cretaceous Research. 36: 162–190. Bibcode:2012CrRes..36..162B. doi:10.1016/j.cretres.2012.02.008. S2CID 129770103.
- Boslough, M., Nicoll, K., Holliday, V., Daulton, T.L., Meltzer, D., Pinter, N., Scott, A.C., Surovell, T., Claeys, Ph., Gill, J., Paquay, F., Marlon, J., Bartlein, P., Whitlock, C., Grayson, D. and Jull, T. 2012. Arguments and Evidence against a Younger Dryas Impact Event. pp. 13–26. In: Giosan, L.; D.Q. Fuller; K. Nicoll; R. Flad and P.D. Clift. (editors) Climates, Landscapes and Civilizations. Geophys. Monogr. Ser., vol. 198, AGU, Washington, D. C., doi:10.1029/2012GM001209.
- Brown S.A.E.; Collinson M.E.; Scott A.C. (2013). "Did fire play a role in formation of dinosaur-rich deposits? An example from the Late Cretaceous of Canada". Palaeobiodiversity and Palaeoenvironments. 93 (3): 317–326. Bibcode:2013PdPe...93..317B. doi:10.1007/s12549-013-0123-y. S2CID 128399865.
- Glasspool, Ian J.; Scott, Andrew C.; Waltham, David; Pronina, Natalia; Shao, Longyi (2015). "The impact of fire on the Late Paleozoic Earth system". Frontiers in Plant Science. 6: 756. Bibcode:2015FrPS....6..756G. doi:10.3389/fpls.2015.00756. PMC 4585212. PMID 26442069.
- Scott, Andrew C.; Chaloner, William G.; Belcher, Claire M.; Roos, Christopher I. (2016). "The interaction of fire and mankind: Introduction". Philosophical Transactions of the Royal Society B: Biological Sciences. 371 (1696). doi:10.1098/rstb.2015.0162. PMC 4874400. PMID 27216519.
- Roos, Christopher I.; Scott, Andrew C.; Belcher, Claire M.; Chaloner, William G.; Aylen, Jonathan; Bird, Rebecca Bliege; Coughlan, Michael R.; Johnson, Bart R.; Johnston, Fay H.; McMorrow, Julia; Steelman, Toddi; Fire and Mankind Discussion Group (2016). "Living on a flammable planet: Interdisciplinary, cross-scalar and varied cultural lessons, prospects and challenges". Philosophical Transactions of the Royal Society B: Biological Sciences. 371 (1696). doi:10.1098/rstb.2015.0469. PMC 4874422. PMID 27216517.
- Balch, Jennifer K.; Nagy, R. Chelsea; Archibald, Sally; Bowman, David M. J. S.; Moritz, Max A.; Roos, Christopher I.; Scott, Andrew C.; Williamson, Grant J. (2016). "Global combustion: The connection between fossil fuel and biomass burning emissions (1997–2010)". Philosophical Transactions of the Royal Society B: Biological Sciences. 371 (1696). Bibcode:2016RSPTB.37150177B. doi:10.1098/rstb.2015.0177. PMC 4874414.
- Hardiman, Mark; Scott, Andrew C.; Pinter, Nicholas; Anderson, R. Scott; Ejarque, Ana; Carter-Champion, Alice; Staff, Richard A. (2016). "Fire history on the California Channel Islands spanning human arrival in the Americas". Philosophical Transactions of the Royal Society B: Biological Sciences. 371 (1696). doi:10.1098/rstb.2015.0167. PMC 4874405. PMID 27216524.)
- Inglis, Gordon N.; Collinson, Margaret E.; Riegel, Walter; Wilde, Volker; Farnsworth, Alexander; Lunt, Daniel J.; Valdes, Paul; Robson, Brittany E.; Scott, Andrew C.; Lenz, Olaf K.; Naafs, B. David A.; Pancost, Richard D. (2017). "Mid-latitude continental temperatures through the early Eocene in western Europe". Earth and Planetary Science Letters. 460: 86–96. Bibcode:2017E&PSL.460...86I. doi:10.1016/j.epsl.2016.12.009.
- Scott, Andrew C.; Hilton, Jason; Galtier, Jean; Stampanoni, Marco (2019). "A Charcoalified Ovule Adapted for Wind Dispersal and Deterring Herbivory from the Late Viséan (Carboniferous) of Scotland". International Journal of Plant Sciences. 180 (9): 1059–1074. Bibcode:2019IJPlS.180.1059S. doi:10.1086/705590.
- Scott, Andrew C. (2022). "Charcoalified vegetation from the Pennsylvanian of Yorkshire, England: Implications for the interpretation of Carboniferous wildfires". Review of Palaeobotany and Palynology. 296 104540. Bibcode:2022RPaPa.29604540S. doi:10.1016/j.revpalbo.2021.104540.
- Rothwell, Gar W.; Dunn, Michael T.; Scott, Andrew C. (2022). "Reconstructing the Tetrastichia bupatides Gordon plant; a Devonian–Mississippian hydrasperman gymnosperm from Oxroad Bay, Scotland and Ballyheigue, Ireland". Review of Palaeobotany and Palynology. 296 104551. Bibcode:2022RPaPa.29604551R. doi:10.1016/j.revpalbo.2021.104551.
- Lardos, Andreas; Patmore, Kristina; Allkin, Robert; Lazarou, Rebecca; Nesbitt, Mark; Scott, Andrew C.; Zipser, Barbara (2024). "A systematic methodology to assess the identity of plants in historical texts: A case study based on the Byzantine pharmacy text John the Physician's Therapeutics". Journal of Ethnopharmacology. 322 117622. doi:10.1016/j.jep.2023.117622. PMC 7615571. PMID 38128894.
- Zipser, Barbara; Lardos, Andreas; Lazarou, Rebecca; Allkin, Robert; Nesbitt, Mark; Scott, Andrew C. (2024). "Interpreting materia medica. A case study on Ioannes Archiatrus". Wellcome Open Research. 8: 502. doi:10.12688/wellcomeopenres.20061.2. PMC 11109676. PMID 38779047.
- Zipser, Barbara; Scott, Andrew C.; Allkin, Robert; Gan, Peretz; Lardos, Andreas; Lazarou, Rebecca; Lev, Efraim; Nesbitt, Mark; Patmore, Kristina (2023). "Pharmaceutical Terminology in Ancient and Medieval Time – andrachne, chrysocolla and Others". Studia Ceranea. 13: 715–736. doi:10.18778/2084-140X.13.49. PMC 7615763. PMID 38524312.
