= Gullane Formation =

Geological formation in Scotland

- Stratigraphic range: Visean
- Type: Formation
- Unit of: Strathclyde Group
- Sub-units: Craigleith Sandstone
- Thickness: c. 560 m

Lithology
- Primary: Sandstone
- Other: Mudstone, siltstone, coal, seatrock, limestone, dolomite, ironstone

Location
- Region: Scotland
- Country: United Kingdom
- Extent: Lothians, south Fife, Berwickshire

The Gullane Formation is a geological formation in Scotland. It preserves fossils dating back to the Visean stage (early Carboniferous period).

== See also ==
- List of fossiliferous stratigraphic units in Scotland
