= Kip Burn Formation =

Geological formation in Scotland

- Stratigraphic range: Late Llandovery
- Type: Formation

Location
- Region: Scotland
- Country: United Kingdom

The Kip Burn Formation is a geological formation in Scotland. It preserves fossils dating back to the Silurian period. This formation is main part of fossil site called Dunside.

== Paleobiota ==
=== Arthropods ===
Arthropods
Species	Notes	Images
Slimonia acuminata	A slimonid eurypterid.	
Erettopterus bilobus	A pterygotid eurypterid.	
Pterygotus lanarkensis	A pterygotid eurypterid.	
Cruinnopterus scorpioides	A carcinosomatid eurypterid.	
Eusarcana obesus	A carcinosomatid eurypterid.	
?Nanahughmilleria lanceolata	An adelophthalmid eurypterid.	
?Parastylonurus sigmoidalis	A parastylonurid eurypterid.	
Pseudoniscus falcatus	A synziphosurine.	
Stylonurella spinipes	A stylonurellid eurypterid.	

=== Chordates ===
Chordates
Species	Notes	Images
Loganellia scotica	A loganelliid thelodont.	
Birkenia elegans	An birkeniid anaspid.	

== See also ==
- List of fossiliferous stratigraphic units in Scotland
