= Stinchar Limestone =

Geological formation in Scotland

- Stratigraphic range: Ordovician
- Type: Formation

Lithology
- Primary: Limestone

Location
- Region: Scotland
- Country: United Kingdom

The Stinchar Limestone is a geological formation in Scotland. It preserves fossils dating back to the Ordovician period.

== See also ==
- List of fossiliferous stratigraphic units in Scotland
- Ballantrae Complex
