= Craighead Limestone =

Geological formation in Scotland

Coordinates: 55°18′19.3824″N 4°40′37.0452″W

- Stratigraphic range: Ordovician
- Type: Formation

Lithology
- Primary: Limestone

Location
- Region: Scotland
- Country: United Kingdom

The Craighead Limestone is a geologic formation in Scotland. It preserves fossils dating back to the Ordovician period.

== See also ==
- List of fossiliferous stratigraphic units in Scotland
