= Estheria Shales Formation =

Geologic formation in Scotland

- Stratigraphic range: Jurassic
- Type: Formation

Location
- Region: Scotland
- Country: United Kingdom

The Estheria Shales Formation is a geologic formation in Scotland. It preserves fossils dating back to the Jurassic period.

== See also ==
- List of fossiliferous stratigraphic units in Scotland
