= Observatory Group =

Geological formation in Scotland

- Stratigraphic range: Devonian
- Type: Group

Location
- Region: Scotland
- Country: United Kingdom

The Observatory Group is a geological group in Scotland. It preserves fossils dating back to the Devonian period.

== See also ==
- List of fossiliferous stratigraphic units in Scotland
