= Whitehouse Group =

- Stratigraphic range: Ordovician
- Type: Group

Location
- Region: Scotland
- Country: United Kingdom

The Whitehouse Group is a geological group in Scotland. It preserves fossils dating back to the Ordovician period.

== See also ==
- List of fossiliferous stratigraphic units in Scotland
