= Ballantrae Complex =

The Ballantrae Complex is an assemblage of rocks in southwest Scotland considered to be an ophiolite, that is a section of the earth's oceanic crust and upper mantle obducted onto continental crust. The complex is bounded by the coast of the Firth of Clyde to the west and the Stinchar Valley Fault, a constituent element of the Southern Uplands Fault to the south. The emplacement of this highly faulted assemblage of both intrusive and extrusive igneous rocks and metamorphic rocks took place within the Grampian phase of the Caledonian orogeny.

== See also ==
- Stinchar Limestone
- Lizard complex (ophiolite in Cornwall)
