= Ganister =

Hard, fine-grained quartzose sandstone, or orthoquartzite

A ganister (or sometimes gannister ) is hard, fine-grained quartzose sandstone, or orthoquartzite, used in the manufacture of silica brick typically used to line furnaces. Ganisters are cemented with secondary silica and typically have a characteristic splintery fracture.

Cornish miners originally coined this term for hard, chemically and physically inert silica-cemented quartzose sandstones, commonly, but not always found as seatearths within English Carboniferous coal measures. This term is now used for similar quartzose sandstones found typically as seatearths in the Carboniferous coal measures of Nova Scotia, the United States, and the Triassic coal-bearing strata of the Sydney Basin in Australia.

Where a ganister underlies coal as a seatearth, it typically is penetrated by numerous root traces. These root traces typically consist of carbonaceous material. Ganisters that contain an abundance of fossil roots, which appear as fine carbonaceous, pencil-like streaks or markings, are called “pencil ganisters”. In other cases, the root traces consist of fine, branching nodules, called “rhizoliths”, which formed around the roots before they decayed.

From detailed studies of ganisters, geologists have concluded that the typical ganister is the silicified surface horizon, i.e. E horizon, of a buried soil, called “paleosol”, developed in sandy sediments. These and other studies have found ganisters to contain abundant evidence of having once been the upper horizon of a soil, which has developed in loamy or sandy sediments. The evidence includes some combination of carbonized roots and rootlets, rhizoliths, illuvial clay cutans, silcrete-like silica cements, and the leaching and alteration of the sandy sediments by weathering and plants. These studies argue that the destruction of easily weathered minerals, i.e. feldspar, within the surface horizon of a soil by soil-forming processes is what creates the quartz-rich nature of ganisters. The silica-cementation that creates a ganister typically results from dissolution of plant opal within a soil profile and its redeposition as silica cement within it. The formation of ganisters have been observed within modern soils, such as in the Okavango Delta of Botswana.

== Bessemer converters ==
An important industrial use of ganister was as the mouldable monolithic refractory lining or brick lining for the acid Bessemer converter, a steel-making process developed in 1856 in Sheffield, England. The process could not initially be used successfully by steelworks other than Bessemer's though, owing to its need for a low phosphorus iron ore. This led to the development of the basic Bessemer or Gilchrist–Thomas process, which used a calcined dolomite lining instead of the siliceous ganister. This alkaline lining with a lime flux reacted with the molten iron to form a slag that removed the phosphorus impurities.
