= Orchard Limestone =

- Stratigraphic range: Carboniferous
- Type: Formation

Location
- Region: Scotland
- Country: United Kingdom

The Orchard Limestone is a geologic formation in Scotland. It preserves fossils dating back to the Carboniferous period.

== See also ==
- List of fossiliferous stratigraphic units in Scotland
