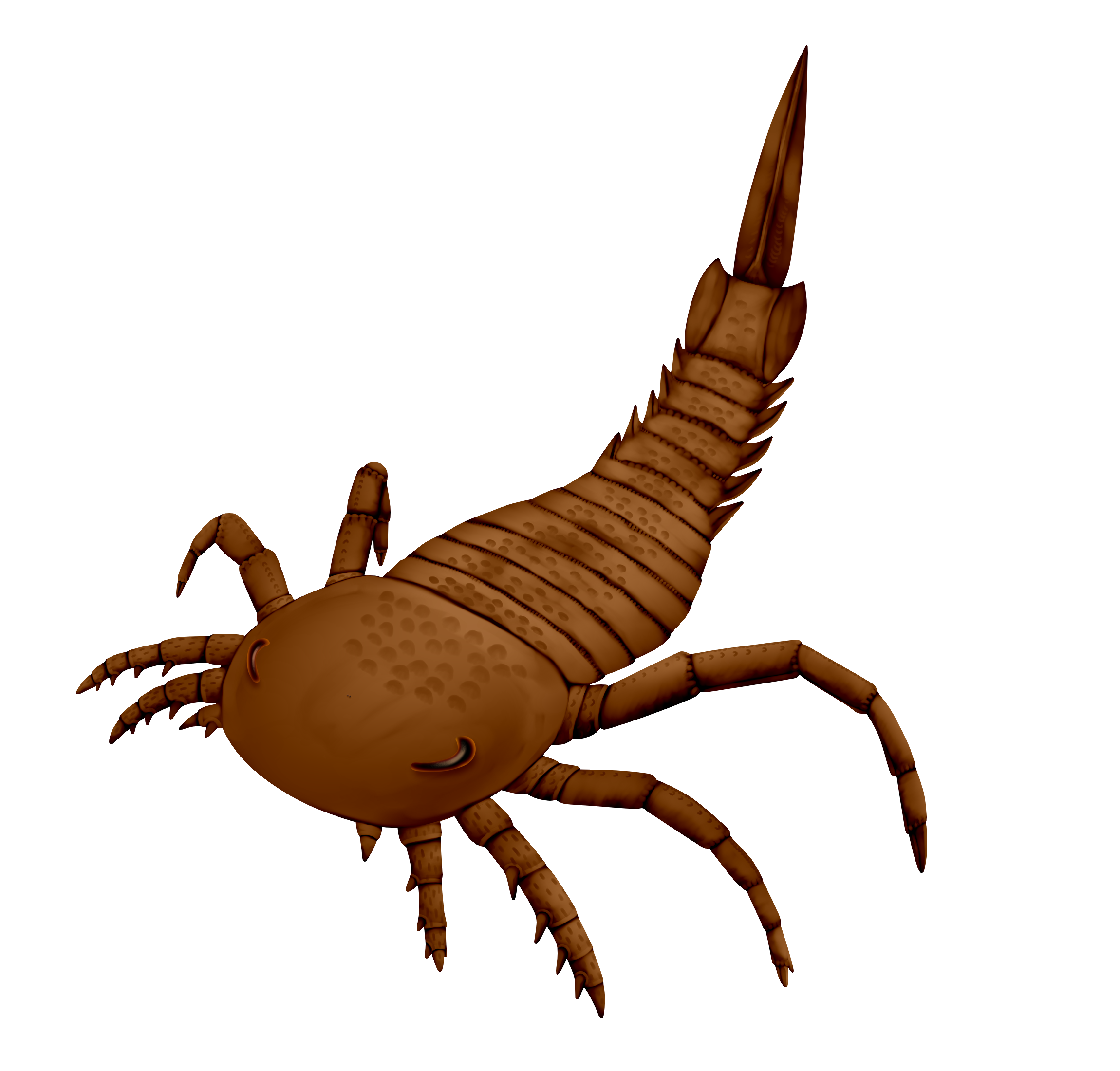
- Life restoration of P. ornatus.
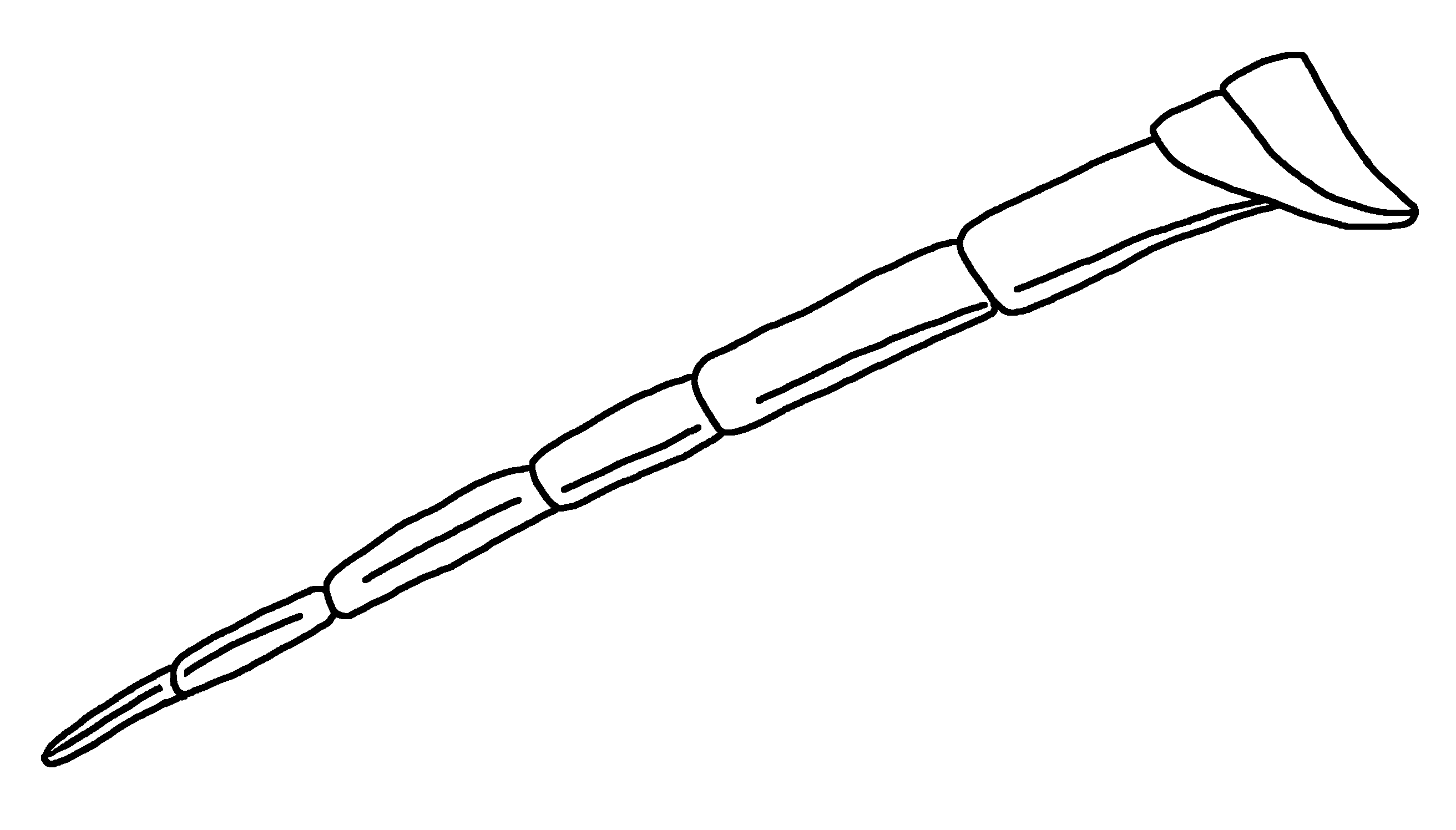
- Restoration of the sixth limb of P. ornatus.

Scientific classification
- Kingdom: Animalia
- Phylum: Arthropoda
- Subphylum: Chelicerata
- Order: †Eurypterida
- Superfamily: †Stylonuroidea
- Family: †Parastylonuridae; Waterston, 1979
- Genus: †Parastylonurus; Kjellesvig-Waering, 1966

Species
- †P. hendersoni Waterston, 1979; †P. ornatus Laurie, 1892 (type species)

= Parastylonurus =

Parastylonurus Temporal range: Silurian

Extinct genus of arthropods

Parastylonurus is a genus of prehistoric eurypterid. It is the only genus classified in the family Parastylonuridae and contains two species, P. hendersoni and P. ornatus from the Silurian of Scotland.

== Description ==
Parastylonurus was a stylonuroid of small to medium size with a rounded prosoma wider than it was long. The eyes were located on the anterior half of the carapace and the metasoma was very long. The first three walking legs were very short with single opposable spines on every joint. The last two walking legs were very long, reaching to the last tergite. The opisthosoma was narrow and undifferentiated and the telson was spike-like.

== Classification ==
Parastylonurus can be differentiated from the closely related Stylonurus in that it lacks the distinct trilobation present in Stylonurus and by the position of the eyes.

== Species ==
Parastylonurus contains two valid species, with other named species now seen as invalid or as part of other genera.

- Parastylonurus hendersoni Waterston, 1979 - Pentland Hills, Scotland (Silurian)
- Parastylonurus ornatus Laurie, 1892 - Scotland (Silurian)

Invalid or reassigned species are listed below:

- "Parastylonurus" beecheri Hall, 1884 - Pennsylvania, USA (Devonian), reclassified as a species of Stylonurella, then designated as a nomen dubium.
- "Parastylonurus" macrophthalmus Laurie, 1892 - Pentland Hills, Scotland (Silurian), reclassified as a species of Hardieopterus.
- "Parastylonurus" megalops Salter, 1859 - Herefordshire, England (Silurian), reclassified as a species of Hardieopterus.
- "Parastylonurus" myops Clarke, 1907 - Eastern USA (Silurian), reclassified as a species of Hardieopterus.
- "Parastylonurus" rusti Ruedemann, 1926 - New York, USA (Ordovician), a pseudofossil.
- "Parastylonurus" sigmoidalis Kjellesvig-Waering, 1971 - Shropshire, England (Silurian), reclassified as a species of Athenepterus.

== See also ==
- List of eurypterids
