= Penkill Formation =

Geological formation in Scotland

- Stratigraphic range: Silurian
- Type: Formation

Location
- Region: Scotland
- Country: United Kingdom

The Penkill Formation is a geological formation in Scotland. It preserves fossils dating back to the Silurian period.

== See also ==
- List of fossiliferous stratigraphic units in Scotland
