= Fossil Grove =

Fossilised tree-like plants in Glasgow, Scotland

Coordinates: 55.8767°N 4.3382°W

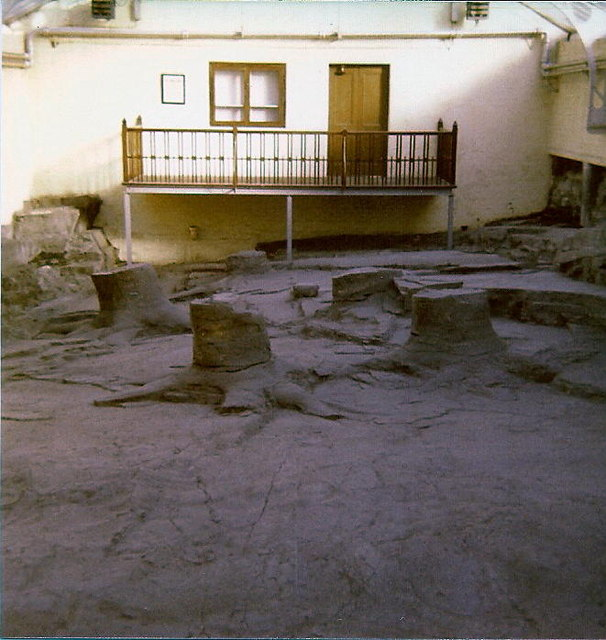
Fossilised lycopsid stumps and stigmarian systems at the Fossil Grove in 1977

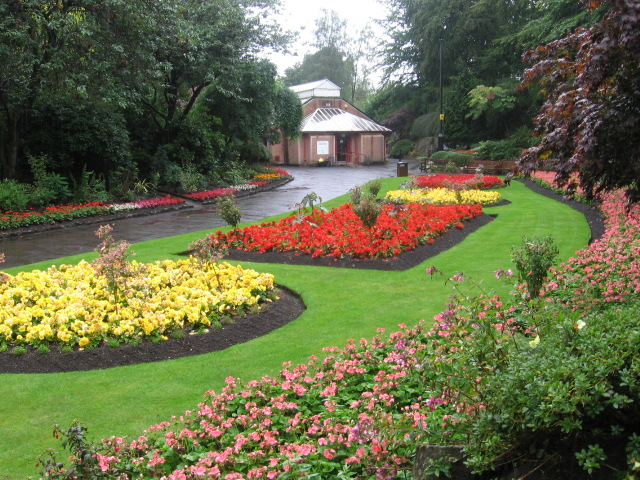
Garden surrounding the Fossil House in 2007

The Fossil Grove is a group of plant fossils located within Victoria Park, Glasgow, Scotland. It was discovered in 1887 and contains the fossilised stumps and the stigmarian system of eleven extinct Lepidodendron lycopsids, which are sometimes described as "giant club mosses" but are more closely related to quillworts. The Fossil Grove is managed as a museum and has been a popular tourist attraction since it opened for public viewing in 1890.

The site, Glasgow's most ancient visitor attraction and the remnants of an extensive ancient forest, is viewed from within a building constructed to protect the fossils from the elements.

== Description ==
The Fossil Grove is on a 23 m (75 ft) by 10 m (33 ft) floor of an old quarry, and belongs to the same geological time period as several other groups of Lepidodendron fossils found northwest of Glasgow. The shales and sandstones exposed around the fossils belong to the Limestone Coal Formation of the Clackmannan Group, with the shale containing imprints of various plant remains. The strata were deposited approximately 325 million years ago when the tree-like plants were still alive, and the strata are now tilted and cut by many faults and slant downwards to the northeast. The quarry in which the fossils were found is an igneous dolerite sill that was intruded into the sediments and two of the trunks during the Early Permian period approximately 290 million years ago. The dolerite was used to macadamize nearby roads. The lycopsids were only discovered after the quarry was abandoned when it was landscaped into the new Victoria Park.

The stumps themselves are internal casts of the hollow lycopsids, representing the huge cortical meristem of the lycopsids rather than the woody interior. The remnants of trunks belonged to Lepidodendron veltheimianum lycopods and the underground systems are called under the form taxon, Stigmaria. The common species of Stigmaria ficoides were discovered from the site. Most trunks are 1–3 ft (0.30–0.91 m) in diameter and 2–3 ft (0.61–0.91 m) tall, and a single larger stump stands in the western part of the grove, measuring 3–4 ft (0.91–1.22 m) in diameter. The trunks are preserved in their original growth positions. Some fossils have small wrinkles on their exterior, suggesting wrinkled bark, but fine details are poorly preserved in the fossils. The root-like appendages have the dichotomous branching pattern indicative of Stigmaria rhizomes and extend over 10 ft (3.0 m) from the trunks. The Lepidodendron lycopods would have grown during the Carboniferous period when Scotland was a more tropical area, situated near the equator. These lycopsids grew in a low, swampy environment that would often flood. The distribution of the trunks suggests that the Grove was once part of a Paleozoic forest that was chiefly composed of Lepidodendron lycopsids.

The sandstone in the Grove is covered with shale that was deposited as mud in a major flooding episode, and this deposition of sediment knocked over and killed the lycopsids. The soft tissues of the cortical meristem and inner phelloderm of the lycopsids then decomposed and made the lycopsid and their underground systems hollow, and subsequent flood waters filled the hollow lycopsid stumps with sand. Ripple marks on some surfaces indicate a south-western flow of the flood waters. The trunks were then buried and lithified, and became molds in the surrounding sandstone. The sand inside the trunks became solid rock, and the outer bark of the lycopsids became a thin layer of coal. Though some trunks are elliptical, especially the tallest, Lepidodendron lycopsids were typically circular. The deformations were likely caused by the force of the rising flood waters that filled the trunks with sand, as indicated by the tendency for the deformations to be in the same direction as the ripple marks, towards the south-west.

Besides the fossil stumps, the only other indications of organic life in the strata of the Fossil Grove are Arenicola burrows found in some sandstone beds.

== History ==
In 1885 part of the Scotstoun estate was leased to create a park, and the Fossil Grove was discovered in late 1887 when a pilot channel was cut through an old quarry in preparation for the construction of a road in the park. In April 1888 members of the Geological Society of Glasgow suggested to leave the fossils in situ and construct a building around the fossils. The commissioners of Partick elected to leave the fossils where they were uncovered and in 1889, at a cost of about £400, constructed a building to contain the fossils. On 1 January 1890, the Fossil House covering the Fossil Grove opened to the public. The wooden roof timbers of the House were replaced with metal trusses in the 1920s. A bomb damaged the roof and a single trunk during World War II, and a concrete spacer replaced the center of the damaged trunk. The windowed roof was replaced with regular roof panels in the 1970s. Today the building continues to be maintained by Glasgow City Council. The Fossil Grove Trust (along with Historic Scotland) are working with the Council to improve the drainage, ventilation, and interpretation of the site. Friends of Victoria Park are establishing a fernery in the adjacent quarry area. The fossil lycopsids are designated as a Site of Special Scientific Interest.

== Visitor information ==
As of July 2022, the Fossil Grove is open from 12:00 to 4:00 p.m. only on the third Sunday of the month, from April to October, and the surrounding park is always open. The Fossil House has stone and tarmac paths and a few stone steps, and is wheelchair accessible. The walk around the entire quarry is about 400 m (1,300 ft) long. Admission is free.

About 50 m (160 ft) east of the Fossil House is an oak sculpture of a lycopod tree with a giant centipede. The sculpture was constructed in 2014 to commemorate the 20th Commonwealth Games.

== See also ==
- Fossil Forest, Dorset
