= Saugh Hill Group =

- Stratigraphic range: Silurian
- Type: Group

Location
- Region: Scotland
- Country: United Kingdom

The Saugh Hill Group is a geological group in Scotland. It preserves fossils dating back to the Silurian period.

== See also ==
- List of fossiliferous stratigraphic units in Scotland
