= Stonehaven Group =

Geologic group in Scotland

- Stratigraphic range: Silurian
- Type: Group

Location
- Region: Scotland
- Country: United Kingdom

The Stonehaven Group is a geological group in Scotland. It preserves fossils dating back to the Silurian period. Fossils of cryptospores, such as the hilate cryptospore Hispanaediscus lamontii, have been found in this geologic group, along with miospores and other plant fragments.

== See also ==
- List of fossiliferous stratigraphic units in Scotland
