= Millbuie Sandstone =

Geological formation in Scotland

- Stratigraphic range: Devonian
- Type: Formation

Lithology
- Primary: Sandstone

Location
- Region: Scotland
- Country: United Kingdom

The Millbuie Sandstone is a geological formation in Scotland. It preserves fossils dating back to the Devonian period.

== See also ==
- List of fossiliferous stratigraphic units in Scotland
