= Bu Ness Group =

- Stratigraphic range: Devonian
- Type: Group

Location
- Region: Scotland
- Country: United Kingdom

The Bu Ness Group is a geologic group in Scotland. It preserves fossils dated to the Devonian period.

== See also ==
- List of fossiliferous stratigraphic units in Scotland
