= Tyne Limestone =

Geological formation in Scotland

- Stratigraphic range: Carboniferous
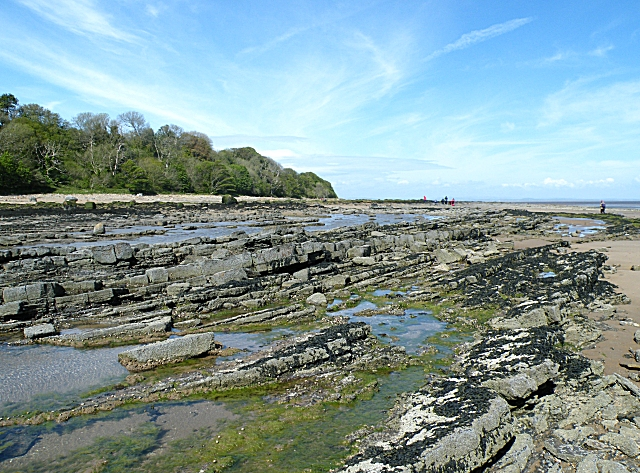
- Abigland Limestone Member, Tyne Limestone
- Type: Formation
- Unit of: Yoredale Group
- Sub-units: Arbigland Limestone Member

Lithology
- Primary: Limestone

Location
- Region: Scotland
- Country: United Kingdom

The Tyne Limestone is a geologic formation in Scotland. It preserves fossils dating back to the Carboniferous period.

== See also ==
- List of fossiliferous stratigraphic units in Scotland
