= Saugh Hill Grits =

Geological formation in Scotland

- Stratigraphic range: Silurian
- Type: Formation

Location
- Region: Scotland
- Country: UK

The Saugh Hill Grits is a geologic formation in Scotland. It preserves fossils dating back to the Silurian period.

== See also ==
- List of fossiliferous stratigraphic units in Scotland
