= List of fossiliferous stratigraphic units in Scotland =

Group or Formation	Period	Notes
Arbuthnott Group/Dundee Formation	Devonian	
Ardwell Farm Formation	Ordovician	
Ardwell Group/Balclatchie Formation	Ordovician	
Ardwell Group/Craighead Limestone	Ordovician	
Balclatchie Formation	Ordovician	
Barr Group/Stinchar Limestone	Ordovician	
Bearreraig Sandstone	Jurassic	
Blackwell Formation	Carboniferous	
Broadford Beds Formation	Jurassic	
Bu Ness Group/North Gavel Beds Formation	Devonian	
Cementstones Formation	Carboniferous	
Cementstones Formation	Carboniferous	
Cementstones Formation	Carboniferous	
Charlestown Main Formation	Carboniferous	
Clackmannan Group/Lower Limestone	Carboniferous	
Clackmannan Formation	Carboniferous	
Clackmannan Group/Upper Limestone	Carboniferous	
Clackmannan Group/Lower Limestone	Carboniferous	
Clackmannan Group/Passage Formation	Carboniferous	
Clackmannan Group/Upper Limestone	Carboniferous	
Coal Measures Formation	Carboniferous	
Croisaphuill Fm. Formation	Ordovician	
Cutties Hillock Sandstone	Permian	
Dounans Limestone	Ordovician	
Drummock Group/Ladyburn Formation	Ordovician	
Drummock Group/South Threave Formation	Ordovician	
Drummuck Group/Lady Burn Formation	Ordovician	
Dryden Shale	Devonian	
Dundee Formation	Devonian	
Eday Flagstone Formation	Devonian	
Eday Flagstone Formation	Devonian	
Fish Bed Formation	Silurian	
Golden Grove Group/Llandeilo Formation	Ordovician	
Great Estuarine Formation	Jurassic	
Great Estuarine Series Group/Estheria Shales Formation	Jurassic	
Great Estuarine Group/Duntulm Formation	Jurassic	
Great Estuarine Group/Kilmaluag Formation	Jurassic	
Great Estuarine Group/Lealt Shale	Jurassic	
Great Estuarine Group/Lealt Shales Formation	Jurassic	
Great Estuarine Group/Valtos Sandstone	Jurassic	
High Mains Formation	Ordovician	
Hillhead Formation	Devonian	
Index Formation	Carboniferous	
Inshes Formation	Devonian	
Interbasaltic Plant Formation	Palaeogene	
Inverclyde Group/Ballagan Formation	Carboniferous	
Kirkcolm Formation	Ordovician	
Limestone Coal Group/Limestone Coal Formation	Carboniferous	
Lossiemouth Sandstone	Triassic	
Lower Limestone	Carboniferous	
Lower Limestone	Carboniferous	
Lower Limestone Group/Middle Longcraig Limestone	Carboniferous	
Lower Lothian Group of Calciferous Sandstone Measures (Series) Group/Garlton Hills Volcanic Formation	Carboniferous	
Lower Lothian Group of Calciferous Sandstone Measures (Series) Group/Garlton Hills Volcanic Formation	Carboniferous	
Lower Oil Shale	Carboniferous	
Lower Oil Shale Group/Wardie Shale	Carboniferous	
Lower Old Red Sandstone Group/Strathmore Group	Devonian	
Lower Stromness flagstone Formation	Devonian	
Manse Burn Formation	Carboniferous	
Mauchline Volcanic Formation	Permian	
Millbuie Sandstone	Devonian	
Millstone Grit Formation	Carboniferous	
Mulloch Hill Group/Mulloch Hill Formation	Silurian	
Newlands Formation	Silurian	
Newlands Group/Mulloch Hill Sandstone	Silurian	
Observatory Group/Furse Argillaceous Beds Formation	Devonian	
Oil Formation	Carboniferous	
Old Red Sandstone Group/Strathmore Group	Devonian	
Orchard Limestone	Carboniferous	
Passage Formation	Carboniferous	
Penkill Group/Penkill Formation	Silurian	
Priesthill Group/Kip Burn Formation	Silurian	
Priesthill Group/Patrick Burn Formation	Silurian	
Reservoir Formation	Silurian	
Sandwick Fish Beds Formation	Devonian	
Saugh Hill Group/Saugh Hill Grits	Silurian	
Scalpa Sandstone	Jurassic	
Second Abden Limestone	Carboniferous	
Second Abden Shale	Carboniferous	
Staffin Bay Formation	Jurassic	
Stonehaven Group/Cowie Formation	Silurian	
Strathclyde Formation	Carboniferous	
Strathclyde Group/Gullane Formation	Carboniferous	
Strathclyde Group/Kirkwood Formation	Carboniferous	
Strathclyde Group/Lawmuir Formation	Carboniferous	
Strathclyde Group/Lower Limestone	Carboniferous	
Superstes Mudstone	Ordovician	
Thurso flagstone Formation	Devonian	
Top Hosie Shale	Carboniferous	
Tyne Limestone	Carboniferous	
Upper Border Group/Glencartholm Volcanic Group	Carboniferous	
Upper Hartfell Shale	Ordovician	
Upper Limestone	Carboniferous	
Upper Oil Shale Group/East Kirkton Limestone	Carboniferous	
Upper Oil Shale Group/Pettycur Volcanics Formation	Carboniferous	
Upper Old Red Sandstone Group/Horse Road Sandstone	Carboniferous	
Valtos Sandstone	Jurassic	
Volcanic (= Lower Oil Shale) Group/Clyde Plateau Volcanic Formation	Carboniferous	
Waterhead Group/Slot Burn Formation	Silurian	
West Lothian Oil Shale Group/Hopetoun Formation	Carboniferous	
Whitehouse Group/Mill Formation	Ordovician	
Whitehouse Group/Shalloch Formation	Ordovician	
Wick Flagstone Formation	Devonian	

== See also ==
- Lists of fossiliferous stratigraphic units in Europe
- Lists of fossiliferous stratigraphic units in the United Kingdom
