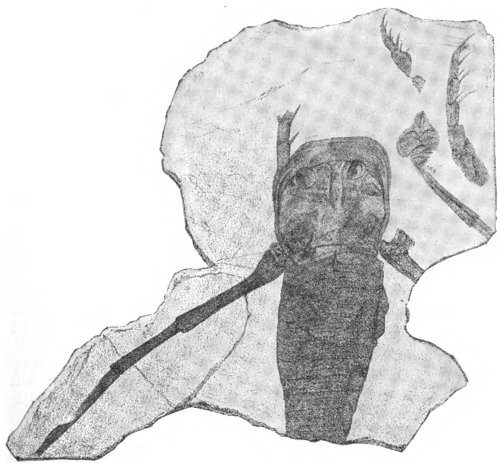
- Fossil illustration of Stylonurella spinipes

Scientific classification
- Kingdom: Animalia
- Phylum: Arthropoda
- Subphylum: Chelicerata
- Order: †Eurypterida
- Superfamily: †Stylonuroidea
- Family: †Stylonurellidae; Lamsdell, 2025
- Genus: †Stylonurella; Kjellesvig-Waering, 1966
- Species: †S. spinipes

Binomial name
- †Stylonurella spinipes Page, 1859

= Stylonurella =

Stylonurella Temporal range: Wenlock

Extinct genus of arthropods

Stylonurella is a genus of prehistoric eurypterid. It is the only genus classified in the Stylonurellidae family and contains a single valid species, S. spinipes from the Silurian of Kip Burn, Scotland.

== Description ==
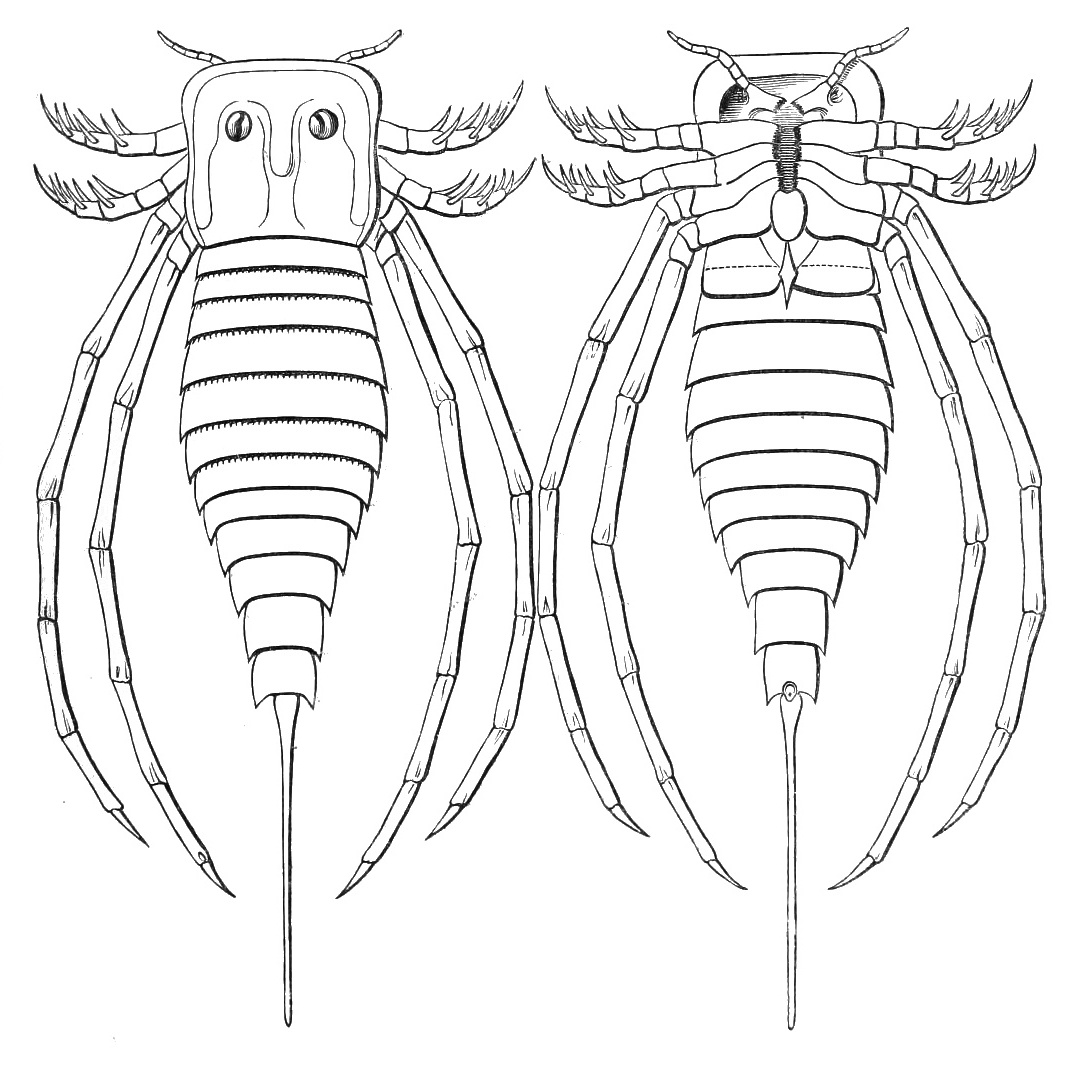
Restoration of S. spinipes.

Stylonurella was a small stylonuroid, possessing a subquadrate prosoma with approximately the same length as width. The midsection was slightly constricted and the eyes were parallel and anteriorly located in the anterior half of the carapace. The metastoma and first two appendages are unknown, the third and fourth prosomal legs are very short and the last two walking legs are very long. The metasoma is very narrow.

== Classification ==
Though one of the earliest described stylonurines, described shortly after the description of Stylonurus itself, it has no close relations to that genus. Indeed, there are numerous and apparent differences. For instance, the eyes of Stylonurus are located on the posterior half of the carapace and those of Stylonurella are on the anterior half.

== Species ==
Size comparison of Stylonurella spinipes

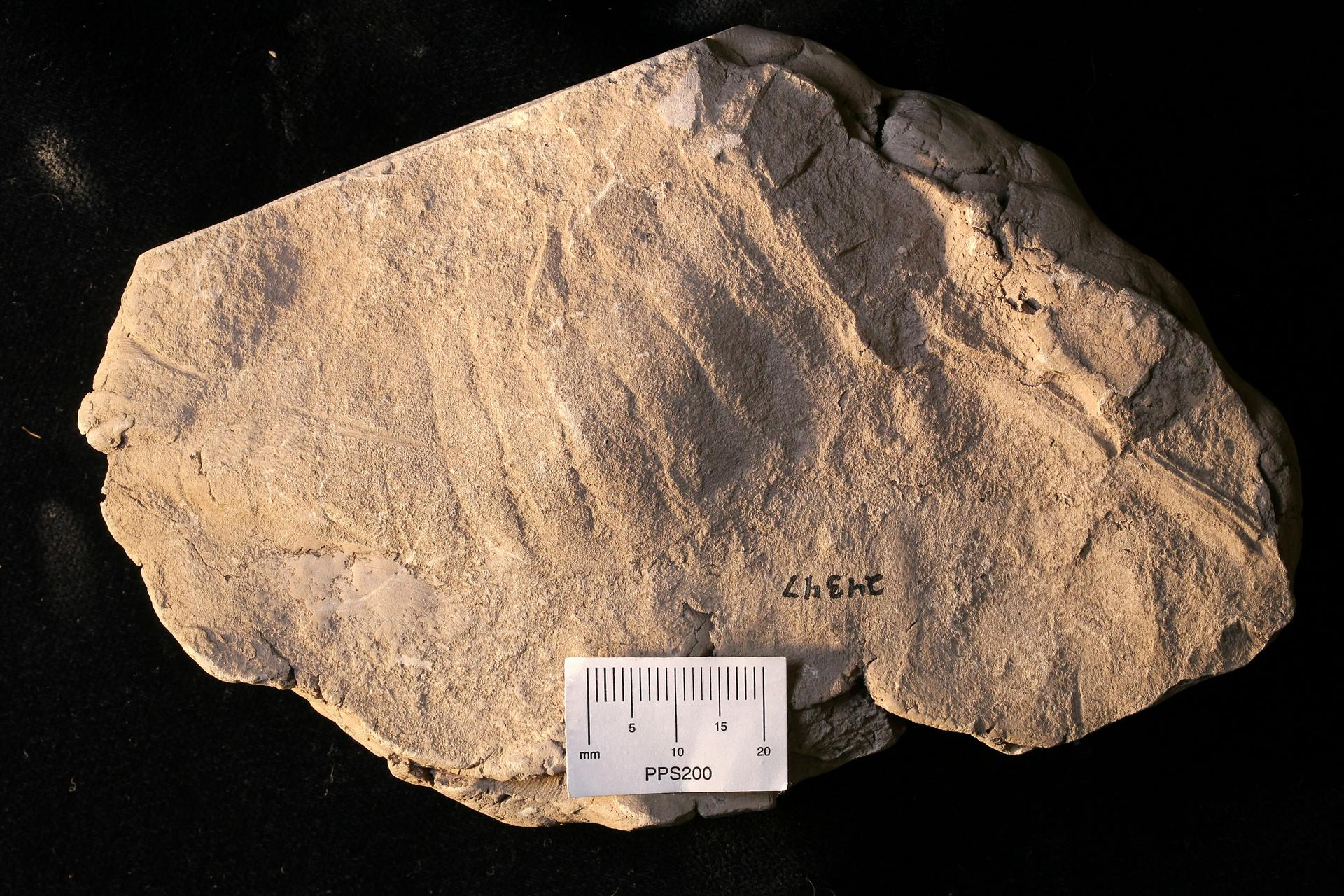
Holotype of "Stylonurella" beecheri, a dubious species that lacks the diagnostic features of the genus

Stylonurella contains one valid species, with other named species now seen as invalid or as part of other genera.

- Stylonurella spinipes Page, 1859 - Kip Burn, Scotland (Silurian)

Invalid or reassigned species are listed below:

- "Stylonurella" arnoldi Ehlers, 1935 - Pennsylvania, USA (Devonian), nomen dubium.
- "Stylonurella" beecheri Hall, 1884 - Pennsylvania, USA (Devonian), nomen dubium.
- "Stylonurella" logani Woodward, 1872 - Kip Burn, Scotland (Silurian), synonym of S. spinipes.
- "Stylonurella" modestus Clarke & Ruedemann, 1912 - New York, USA (Ordovician), a pseudofossil.
- "Stylonurella" otisius Clarke, 1907 - Eastern USA (Silurian), reclassified as a species of Clarkeipterus.
- "Stylonurella" ruedemanni Størmer, 1934 - Ringerike, Norway (Silurian), reclassified as a species of Kiaeropterus.

== See also ==
- List of eurypterids
