= Clackmannan Group =

Geologic formation in Scotland

- Stratigraphic range: Carboniferous
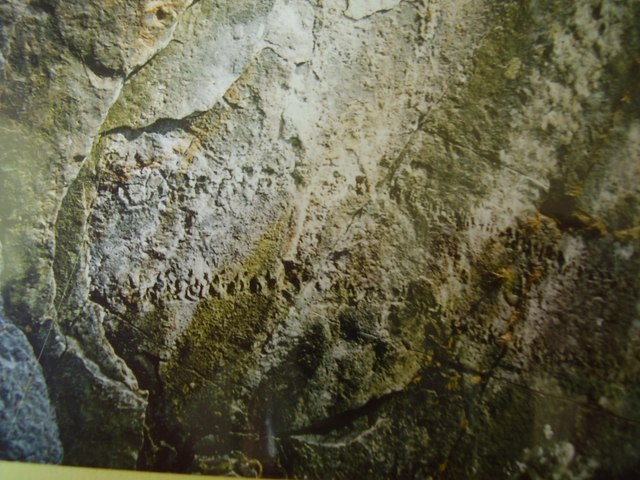
- Fossil trail of giant Myriapod, Limestone Coal Formation, Clackmannan Group
- Type: Group
- Sub-units: Lower Limestone Formation, Limestone Coal Formation, Upper Limestone Formation, Passage Formation
- Underlies: Coal Measures Group
- Overlies: Strathclyde Group

Lithology
- Primary: sandstones, mudstones
- Other: limestones, siltstones, ironstones, coal, seatrocks, fireclay

Location
- Region: Central Lowlands of Scotland
- Country: United Kingdom

Type section
- Named for: Clackmannan (town)

The Clackmannan Group is the name given to a suite of rocks of late Dinantian and Namurian age laid down during the Carboniferous period in the Midland Valley of Scotland.

== Description ==
The Group comprises a lower unit of coarse sandstones, siltstones, mudstone, and limestones with thin coals and ironstones known as the Lower Limestone Formation, an overlying sequence of similar rocks known as the Limestone Coal Formation, then an Upper Limestone Formation and at its top the sandstones of the Passage Formation. This last formation also includes fireclays, siltstones, mudstones, ironstones, coal and seatrocks.

The Clackmannan Group conformably overlays the rocks of the Strathclyde Group and underlays the Coal Measures, this latter boundary also being conformable.

== Paleontology ==
Remains of the prehistoric shark †Cladodus elegans Newberry & Worthen, 1870 (braincase and a tooth) have been found in the Lower Limestone Formation.

== See also ==
- Fossil Grove
