= Seatearth =

Seatearth is a British coal mining term that is used in the geological literature. As noted by Jackson, a seatearth is the layer of sedimentary rock underlying a coal seam. Seatearths have also been called seat earth, "seat rock", or "seat stone" in the geologic literature. Depending on its physical characteristics, a number of different names, such as underclay, fireclay, flint clay, and ganister, can be applied to a specific seatearth.

== Underclay ==
Underclay is a seatearth composed of soft, dispersible clay or other fine-grained sediment, either immediately underlying or forming the floor of a coal seam. Underclay typically contains fossil roots and exhibits noticeably developed soil structures. It has often been altered by weathering. Underclays, which occur within Carboniferous coal measures, commonly contain stigmarian roots. Synonyms for underclay included seat clay, root clay, thill, warrant, coal clay, and warrant clay

Underclays typically show considerable evidence of having been altered by plant activity and soil-forming processes and are either in whole or in part buried soils, called paleosols. As documented in various detailed studies, underclays and seatearths typically exhibit features characteristic of soil profile development. Depending on the specific underclay, these soil features can include some combination of pedogenic slickensides, pedogenic ped structures, illuviated clay pore fillings, different types of pedogenic microfabrics, rhizocretions, caliche nodules, root moulds, and soil horizons. In the better-developed paleosols, significant alteration of the mineralogy, i.e. leaching and translocation of alkali and alkaline earth elements and the kaolinitization of smectites and hydroxy-interlayer vermiculite, will have occurred. In poorly developed paleosols, as seen in the soil profiles of modern poorly developed soils, called "inceptisols", of modern river deltas and floodplains, there might not exist any noticeable alteration of the underclay.

These studies demonstrate that a paleosol, which is either developed in or comprises an underclay, largely reflects the effects of plants and other soil-forming processes on the underclay while it formed the ground surface prior to being buried by organic sediments. Plant growth, waterlogging, and other processes that occurred during the development of a mire or swamp, in which a layer of peat accumulated that later became the overlying coal, modified the paleosol to create an underclay.

== Fire clay ==
Underclay, which consists of siliceous refractory clay rich in hydrous aluminium silicates, is also called fireclay. Just as not all underclays are fireclays, not all fireclays are underclays. Within Carboniferous and other coal-bearing strata, fireclay quite commonly comprises many underclays. The alteration of sediments by weathering, plants, and other soil processes comprising underclay resulted in the formation of the vast majority of fireclay that comprises underclay.

== Flint clay ==
Another clay associated with coal beds is a smooth, flint-like refractory clay or mudstone composed predominantly of kaolin, called "flint clay". Flint clay breaks with a pronounced conchoidal fracture and resists slaking in water, due to its highly crystalline kaolinite.

Flint clay can be either detrital or authegenic in origin. Detrital flint clays consist of kaolinite-rich sediments eroded and transported from uplands deeply weathered under tropical climates and redeposited within the coastal plains, in which coal-bearing strata accumulated. Authigenic flint clays consist of sediments altered in place after deposition as beds within acid, such as peat, accumulating within swamps and mires.

Flint clay can also be associated with other non-coal related kaolin deposits, so not all flint clay is a seat-earth.

Flint clays associated with coal typically occur as thin, laterally continuous layers (bands), called "tonsteins", found within coal beds. In the case of tonsteins found within coal, the formation of flint clays resulted from the alternation of glass comprising volcanic ash by acidic waters after it accumulated as thin beds within peat swamps or mires.

== Ganister ==
Like fireclays, ganisters are found within Carboniferous and other sedimentary strata independent of coal beds. Thus, as in the case of fireclays, not all ganisters are seatearths. Ganisters are indurated, fine-grained quartzose sandstones that can be used in the manufacture of silica brick. They are cemented with secondary silica and have a characteristic splintery fracture.

As defined, ganisters can be created by either the cementation of quartzose by surficial soil-forming processes to form silcrete, or by diagenetic cementation within the subsurface. Detailed studies of ganisters, which occur either as seatearths or elsewhere within coal-bearing strata, have found them to be ancient paleosols, which are equivalent in both physical characteristics and origin to modern silica-cemented soils, called silcretes. Modern formation of ganisters has been observed in the Okavango Delta of Botswana.
