= Strathclyde Group =

Geologic group in Scotland

- Stratigraphic range: Carboniferous
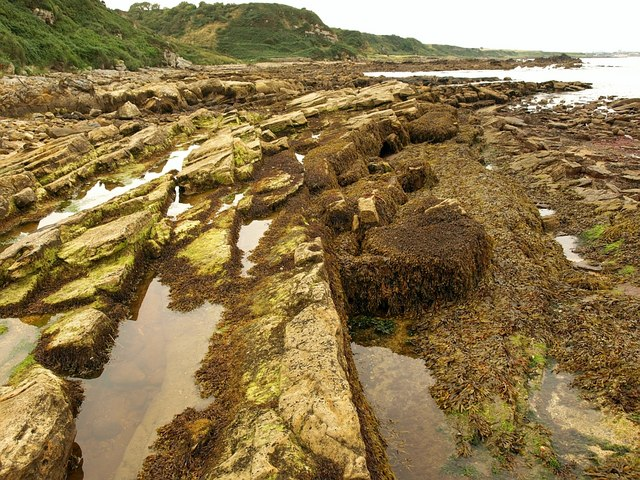
- Dipping strata of the Strathclyde Group at the foreshore near Kittock's Den, Fife
- Type: Group
- Sub-units: Clyde Plateau Volcanic Formation, West Lothian Oil Shale Formation
- Underlies: Clackmannan Group
- Thickness: up to 1500 m

Location
- Region: Scotland
- Country: United Kingdom
- Extent: Midland Valley

The Strathclyde Group is a geological group found in the Midland Valley of Scotland. It preserves fossils of the Visean age (early Carboniferous period).

== See also ==
- List of fossiliferous stratigraphic units in Scotland
