= Global Standard Stratigraphic Age =

Units in geochronology and stratigraphy
Segments of rock (strata) in chronostratigraphy	Time spans in geochronology	Notes to geochronological units
Eonothem	Eon	4 total, half a billion years or more
Erathem	Era	10 defined, several hundred million years
System	Period	22 defined, tens to ~one hundred million years
Series	Epoch	38 defined, tens of millions of years
Stage	Age	101 defined, millions of years
Chronozone	Chron	subdivision of an age, not used by the ICS timescale

In the stratigraphy sub-discipline of geology, a Global Standard Stratigraphic Age, abbreviated GSSA, is a chronological reference point and criterion in the geologic record used to define the boundaries (an internationally sanctioned benchmark point) between different geological periods, epochs or ages on the overall geologic time scale in a chronostratigraphically useful rock layer. A worldwide multidisciplinary effort has been ongoing since 1974 to define such important metrics. The points and strata need be widespread and contain an identifiable sequence of layers or other unambiguous marker (identifiable or quantifiable) attributes.

GSSAs are defined by the International Commission on Stratigraphy (ICS) under the auspices of their parent organization, the International Union of Geological Sciences (IUGS), and are used primarily for time dating of rock layers older than 630 million years ago, lacking a good fossil record.

The geologic record is more restricted before about 539 million years ago. This is because the Earth's crust in geological time scales is constantly being recycled by tectonic and weathering forces, and older rocks and especially readily accessible exposed strata that can act as a time calibration are rare.

For more recent periods, a Global Boundary Stratotype Section and Point (GSSP), largely based on paleontology and improved methods of fossil dating, is used to define such boundaries. In contrast to GSSAs, GSSPs are based on important events and transitions within a particular stratigraphic section. In older sections, there is insufficient fossil record or well preserved sections to identify the key events necessary for a GSSP, so GSSAs are defined based on fixed dates and selected criteria. The ICS first attempts to meet the standards of the GSSPs (see below) and if those fail, usually have enough information to make a preliminary selection of several competing GSSA prospects or proposals.

== See also ==
- Mammal Neogene zones of Europe
- North American land mammal age
- South American land mammal age
- Type locality
- List of Global Boundary Stratotype Sections and Points
