= International Commission on Stratigraphy =

Non-governmental geological organization

- Abbreviation: ICS
- Formation: 1974; 52 years ago
- Type: INGO
- Region served: Worldwide
- Official language: English, French
- Parent organization: International Union of Geological Sciences (IUGS)
- Website: stratigraphy.org

The International Commission on Stratigraphy (ICS), sometimes unofficially referred to as the International Stratigraphic Commission, is a daughter or major subcommittee grade scientific organization that concerns itself with stratigraphical, geological, and geochronological matters, worldwide.

It is the largest subordinate body of the International Union of Geological Sciences (IUGS). The ICS is essentially a permanent working subcommittee, which meets far more regularly than the quadrennial meetings scheduled by the IUGS, when it meets as a congress or membership of the whole.

== Aims ==
Units in geochronology and stratigraphy
Segments of rock (strata) in chronostratigraphy	Time spans in geochronology	Notes to geochronological units
Eonothem	Eon	4 total, half a billion years or more
Erathem	Era	10 defined, several hundred million years
System	Period	22 defined, tens to ~one hundred million years
Series	Epoch	38 defined, tens of millions of years
Stage	Age	101 defined, millions of years
Chronozone	Chron	subdivision of an age, not used by the ICS timescale

One of its main aims, a project begun in 1974, is to establish a multidisciplinary standard and global geologic time scale that will ease paleontological and geobiological comparisons region to region by benchmarks with stringent and rigorous strata criteria called Global Boundary Stratotype Section and Points (GSSPs) within the fossil record. (i.e. section of the rock record as of a core sample section or accessible exposed strata, which when a core sample are usually "trayed" in long pieces, also called "sections" about a meter in length.)

== Methodology ==
Additionally the ICS defines an alternative type of benchmark and criteria called Global Standard Stratigraphic Ages (GSSAs) where the characteristics and dating criteria set solely by physical sciences methods (such as magnetic alignment sequences, radiological criteria, etcetera.) as well as encouraging an international and open debate amongst Earth scientists in the paleontology, geology, geobiology and chronostratigraphy fields, among others.

The International Commission on Stratigraphy has spawned numerous subcommittee level organizations organized and mobilized on a local country-wide or regional basis that are the true working committees of the IUGS, and these do the field work, basis comparisons in conference or co-ordination research committee meetings of local or wide-scale scope.

== Publications ==
The ICS publishes various reports and findings as well as revised references periodically, summarized in the International Stratigraphic Chart, a combined working proposal and guideline-to-date released after the last ICS deliberations prior to the upcoming (next) meeting of the IUGS. Until the IUGS accepts the recommendations, they are unofficial since the IUGS parent approves or dismisses the individual deliberation reports of the ICS, which are presented as recommendations, and span dating and strata selection criteria, and related issues including nomenclatures. In de facto everyday matters, the deliberative results reported out of any meetings of the ICS are widely accepted and immediately enter everyday use, except in the rare cases where they result in a strong body of dissenting opinion, which matters are resolved before the full IUGS.

One such controversy arose in 2009 when the ICS deliberated and decided that the Pliocene Series of the current but unofficially named Quaternary Period should be shifted into the Neogene System and Neogene Period. Despite the strong debate, the Quaternary saw official ratification as a geological unit from the IUGS in June 2009, placing its lower boundary to the Gelasian Stage/Age at Monte San Nicola, Sicily, Italy (until then uppermost part of the Pliocene Series/Epoch, and thus of the Neogene System/Period), 2.58 Ma BP.

In addition to publishing paper and document (PDF) versions of the International Stratigraphic Chart, the ICS also provides a machine-readable version of the chart formulated using the Web Ontology Language (OWL) and, in particular, Time Ontology in OWL. The ICS' chart web page also provides an interactive version of the chart, based on the OWL data.

== Logo ==
The logo of International Commission on Stratigraphy was designed after the Chinese character of "mountain", 山.
