= Global Boundary Stratotype Section and Point =

Boundary of a stage on the geologic time scale

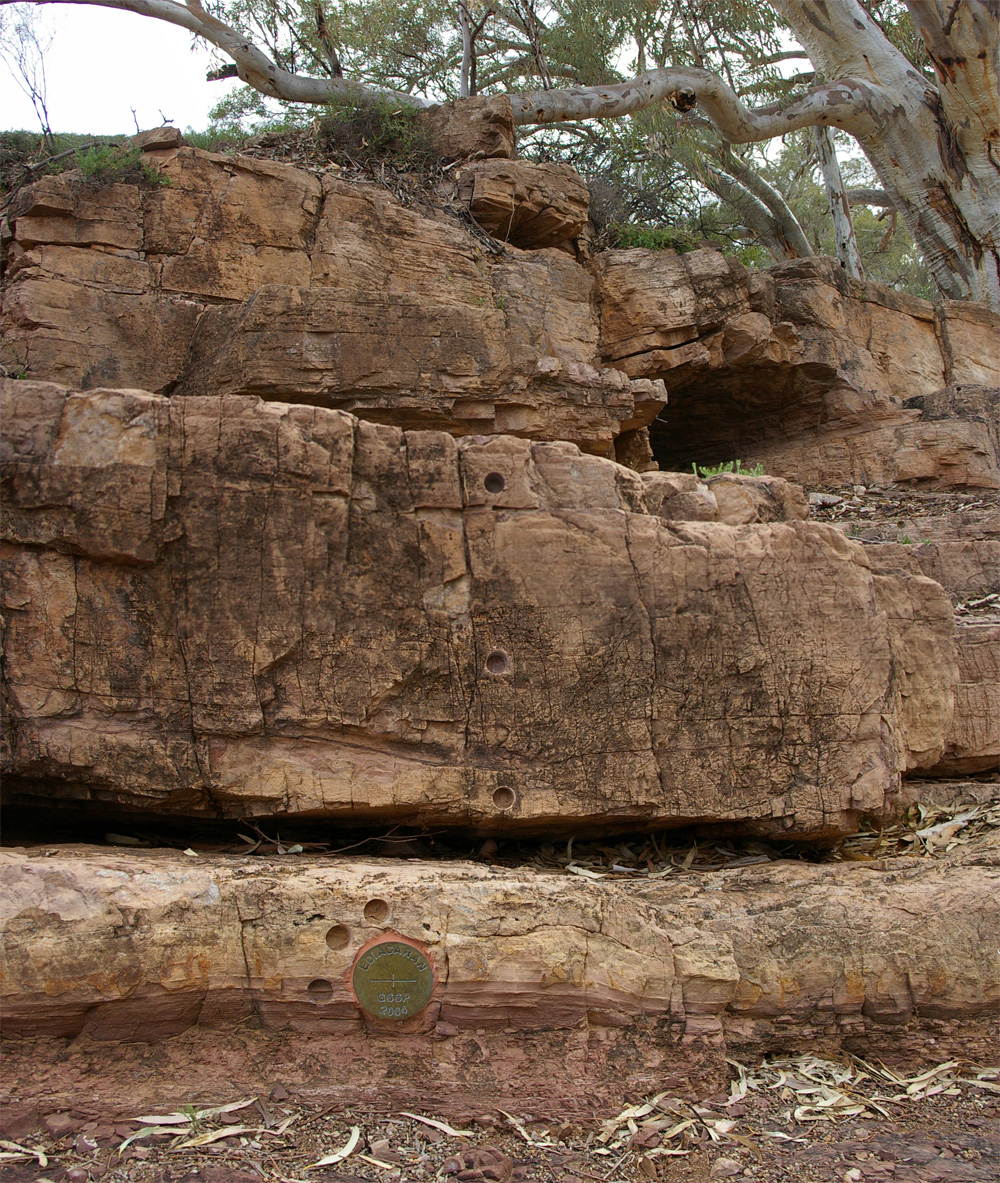
The 'golden spike' (bronze disk in the lower section of the image) or 'type section' of the Global Boundary Stratotype Section and Point (GSSP) for the base of Ediacaran period (Ediacara, South Australia)

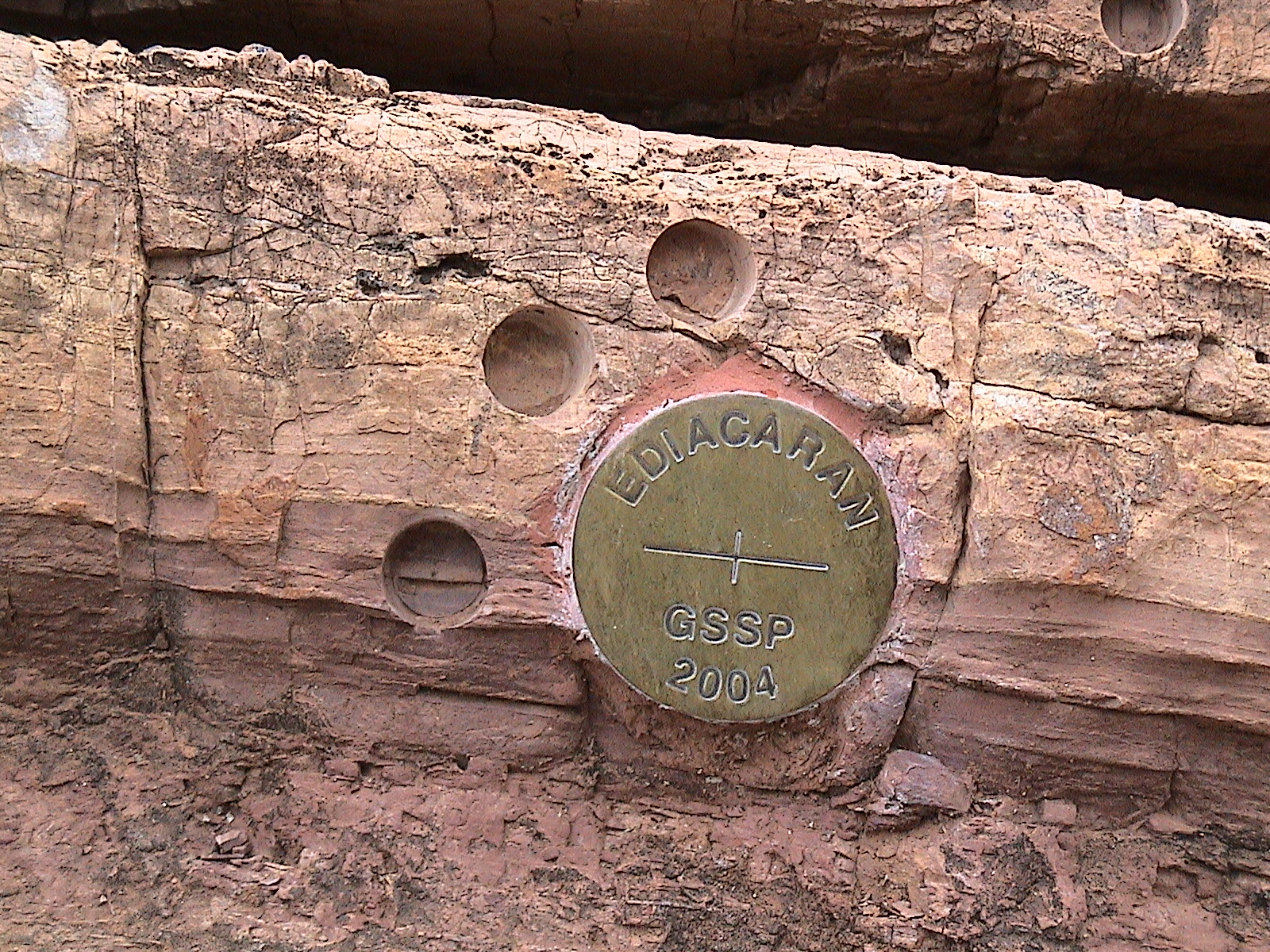
The 'golden spike' marking the Ediacaran GSSP

A Global Boundary Stratotype Section and Point (GSSP), sometimes referred to as a golden spike, is an internationally agreed upon reference point on a stratigraphic section which defines the lower boundary of a stage on the geologic time scale. The effort to define GSSPs is conducted by the International Commission on Stratigraphy, a part of the International Union of Geological Sciences. Most, but not all, GSSPs are based on paleontological changes. Hence GSSPs are usually described in terms of transitions between different faunal stages, though far more faunal stages have been described than GSSPs. The GSSP definition effort commenced in 1977. As of 2025, 81 of the 101 stages that need a GSSP have a ratified GSSP.

== Rules ==
A geologic section has to fulfill a set of criteria to be adapted as a GSSP by the ICS. The following list summarizes the criteria:

- A GSSP has to define the lower boundary of a geologic stage.
- The lower boundary has to be defined using a primary marker (usually first appearance datum of a fossil species).
  - There should also be secondary markers (other fossils, chemical, geomagnetic reversal).
  - The horizon in which the marker appears should have minerals that can be radiometrically dated.
  - The marker has to have regional and global correlation in outcrops of the same age.
  - The marker should be independent of facies.
- The outcrop has to have an adequate thickness.
- Sedimentation has to be continuous without any changes in facies.
- The outcrop should be unaffected by tectonic and sedimentary movements, and metamorphism.
- The outcrop has to be accessible to research and free to access.
  - This includes that the outcrop has to be located where it can be visited quickly (international airport and roads), has to be kept in good condition (ideally a national reserve), in accessible terrain, extensive enough to allow repeated sampling and open to researchers of all nationalities.

== Agreed-upon Global Boundary Stratotype Section and Points ==
World map of all ratified GSSPs, SABSs, and GSSAs. GSSPs use red markers, SABSs use green markers, and GSSAs use purple markers.

Once a GSSP boundary has been agreed upon, a 'golden spike' is driven into the geologic section to mark the precise boundary for future geologists (though in practice the 'spike' need neither be golden nor an actual spike). As such, GSSPs are also sometimes referred to as golden spikes. The first stratigraphic boundary was defined in 1972 by identifying the Silurian-Devonian boundary with a bronze plaque at a locality called Klonk, northeast of the village of Suchomasty in the Czech Republic.

=== Fortune Head GSSP ===
The Precambrian-Cambrian boundary GSSP at Fortune Head, Newfoundland is a typical GSSP. It is accessible by paved road and is set aside as a nature preserve. A continuous section is available from beds that are clearly Precambrian into beds that are clearly Cambrian. The boundary is set at the first appearance of a complex trace fossil Treptichnus pedum that is found worldwide. The Fortune Head GSSP is unlikely to be washed away or built over. Nonetheless, Treptichnus pedum is less than ideal as a marker fossil as it is not found in every Cambrian sequence, and it is not assured that it is found at the same level in every exposure. In fact, further eroding its value as a boundary marker, it has since been identified in strata 4m below the GSSP. However, no other fossil is known that would be preferable. There is no radiometrically datable bed at the boundary at Fortune Head, but there is one slightly above the boundary in similar beds nearby. These factors have led to suggestions that this GSSP is in need of reassigning.

== Global Standard Stratigraphic Ages ==
Because defining a GSSP depends on finding well-preserved geologic sections and identifying key events, this task becomes more difficult as one goes farther back in time. Before 630 million years ago, boundaries on the geologic timescale are defined simply by reference to fixed dates, known as "Global Standard Stratigraphic Ages" (GSSAs).

== See also ==
Units in geochronology and stratigraphy
| Segments of rock (strata) in chronostratigraphy | Time spans in geochronology | Notes to geochronological units |
|---|---|---|
| Eonothem | Eon | 4 total, half a billion years or more |
| Erathem | Era | 10 defined, several hundred million years |
| System | Period | 22 defined, tens to ~one hundred million years |
| Series | Epoch | 38 defined, tens of millions of years |
| Stage | Age | 101 defined, millions of years |
| Chronozone | Chron | subdivision of an age, not used by the ICS timescale |

- Body plan
- MN zonation
- Fauna
- Geologic time scale
  - New Zealand geologic time scale
- North American land mammal age
- Type locality
