= Eonothem =

Totality of rock strata laid down during a certain eon of the geologic timescale

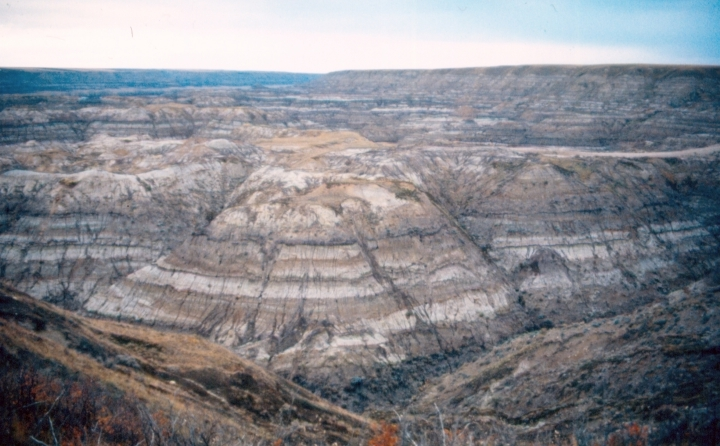
Horseshoe Canyon Formations exposed in Horseshoe Canyon near Drumheller, Alberta.

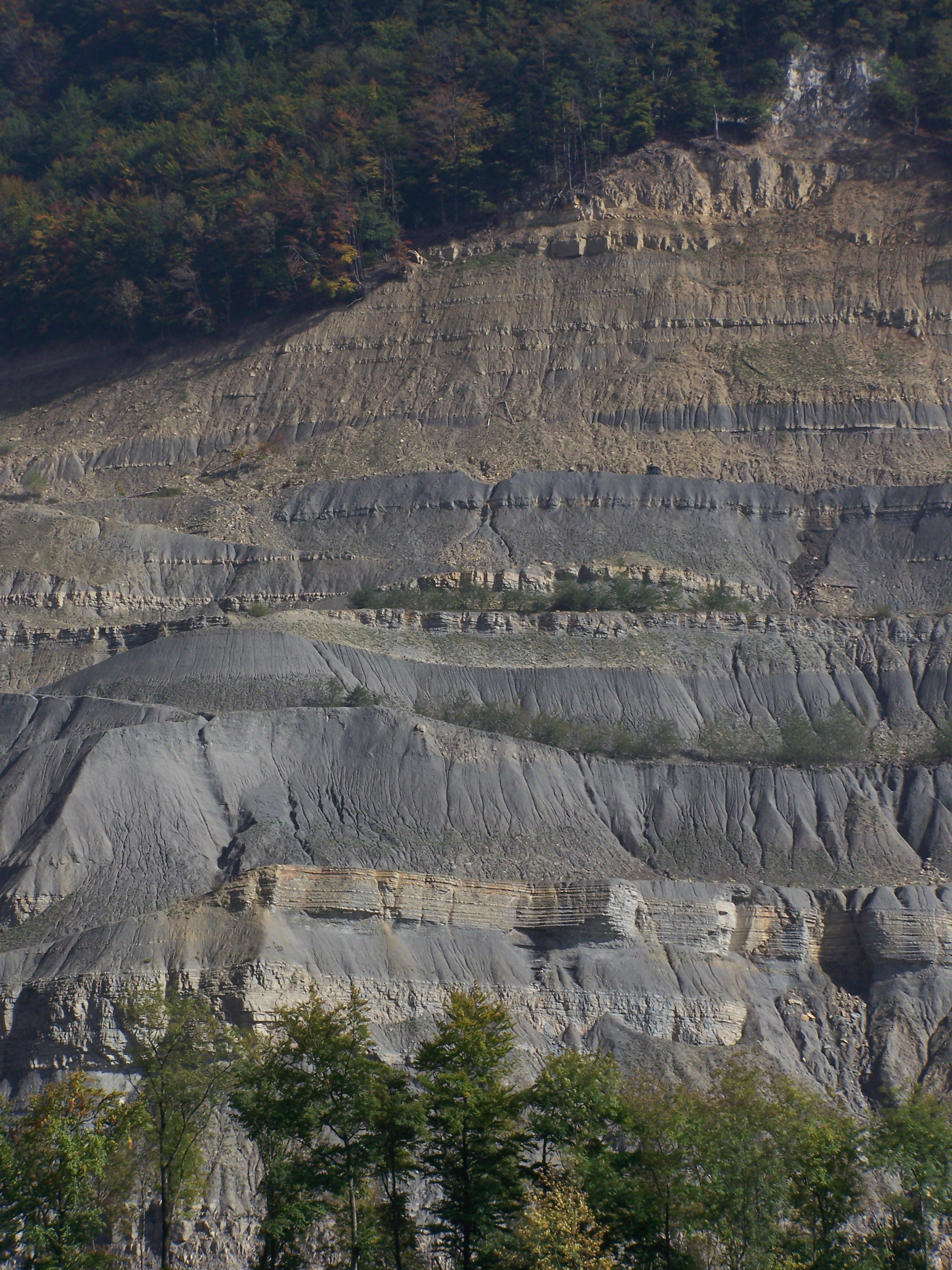
Oxfordian (Upper Jurassic) cyclic sediments at Péry-Reuchenette, near Tavannes, kanton Bern, Switzerland. Alternating layers are limestone (light, more competent) and marl/clay; dominant cycle is the 200000 year-cycle.

In stratigraphy and geology, an eonothem is the totality of rock strata laid down in the stratigraphic record deposited during a certain eon of the continuous geologic timescale. The eonothem is not to be confused with the eon itself, which is a corresponding division of geologic time spanning a specific number of (hundreds of millions of) years, during which rocks were formed that are classified within the eonothem. Eonothems have the same names as their corresponding eons, which means during the history of the Earth only four eonothems were formed. Oldest to newest these are the Hadean, Archean, Proterozoic, and Phanerozoic. A rock stratum, fossil or feature present in the "upper Phanerozoic" eonothem would therefore have originated within the "later Phanerozoic" eon. In practice, the rock column is discontinuous:

Technically, a complete geologic record doesn't occur anywhere. For such a record to develop would require the area to have been receiving sedimentary deposits continually ever since the origin of the earth. Nowhere is such a situation known to exist. If it did exist, we could not effectively look at the strata because they would still be buried, and modern strata would continue to be deposited on top of them. The earth's surface has been far too dynamic to allow that to occur anywhere. No area has been in such a static condition throughout the earth's long history. Areas that have had sediment deposited on them at one time are later uplifted and eroded. In some places this has occurred many times. There is ample evidence to prove such a sequence of events.

Eonothems, despite discontinuities (locally missing strata or unconformities), can be compared to others where the rock record is more complete and, by correlation of points of correspondence, be fixed appropriately within the eon. They are therefore useful as broad chronostratigraphic units, specifying approximate age within the timelines within the rock column.

Eonothems are subdivided into erathems and their smaller subdivisions within geology and paleobiology and their sub-fields, and a whole system of cross-disciplinary classification by strata is in place with oversight by the International Commission on Stratigraphy.

Eonothems are not often used in practice as expert dating estimates can be and usually are specified into the more refined timelines of smaller chronostratigraphic units, which can be subdivided in turn down to the many defined stages, the smallest formally recognised units used in dating. (see the hierarchy of comparative units, five each for time division types and five for the rock record types.)

== Dating standards ==
Global Standard Stratigraphic Ages (GSSAs) are defined by the International Commission on Stratigraphy and are used primarily for time-dating rock layers older than 630 million years ago (mya), before a good fossil record exists.

For more recent periods, a Global Boundary Stratotype Section and Point (GSSP), largely based on research progress in geobiology and improved methods of fossil dating is used to define such boundaries. In contrast to GSSAs, GSSPs are based on important events and transitions within a particular stratigraphic section. In older sections, there is insufficient fossil record or well preserved sections to identify the key events necessary for a GSSP so GSSAs are defined based on fixed dates.

== Etymology ==
Eonothem derives from eon 'age', a Latin transliteration from the koine Greek word αἰών (aion) from the archaic αἰϝών (aiwon), and thema 'that which is placed or laid down; subject of a discourse'.

== See also ==
=== Multidiscipline comparison ===
Units in geochronology and stratigraphy
Segments of rock (strata) in chronostratigraphy	Time spans in geochronology	Notes to geochronological units
Eonothem	Eon	4 total, half a billion years or more
Erathem	Era	10 defined, several hundred million years
System	Period	22 defined, tens to ~one hundred million years
Series	Epoch	38 defined, tens of millions of years
Stage	Age	101 defined, millions of years
Chronozone	Chron	subdivision of an age, not used by the ICS timescale

- Chronostratigraphy
- Lithostratigraphy
- Geologic record

=== Related other topics ===
- Body form
- Fauna (animals)
- Type locality
