= Geon =

Geon may refer to:

- Geon (geology), a time interval
- Gun (Korean name), a Korean given name
- Geon (physics), a hypothetical gravitational or electromagnetic wave packet which is held together in a confined region by the gravitational attraction of its own field energy
- Geon (psychology), a geometrical primitive out of which everyday objects can be represented
- Geon, short for geonim, rabbis in the medieval era
- Geon, a character from the King of the Monsters series of video games
- Geon: Emotions, a video game for Xbox 360's Xbox Live Arcade service
- Geon (video game), for PlayStation 3's PlayStation Network and Nintendo Wii
