= Geologic time scale =

System that relates geologic strata to time

Geologic time scale

The geologic time scale or geological time scale describes how geologic time is divided into standardised intervals. It uses the rock record together with the principles of chronostratigraphy to place rock sequences into their relative age positions, and geochronology techniques, such as radiometric dating, to precisely date the boundaries between them. The geologic time scale is used primarily by those in the Earth sciences (including geologists, paleontologists, geophysicists, geochemists, and paleoclimatologists) to describe the timing and relationships of events in geologic history. The time scale has been developed through the study of rock layers and the observation of their relationships and identifying features such as lithologies, paleomagnetic properties, and fossils.

The definition of standardised international units of geological time is the responsibility of the International Commission on Stratigraphy (ICS), a constituent body of the International Union of Geological Sciences (IUGS), whose primary objective is to precisely define global chronostratigraphic units of the International Chronostratigraphic Chart (ICC) that are used to define divisions of geological time. The chronostratigraphic divisions are in turn used to define geochronologic units.

== Principles ==
The geologic time scale is a way of representing deep time based on events that have occurred throughout Earth's history, a time span of about 4.54 ± 0.05 billion years. It arranges the rock record in chronological order by observing fundamental changes in stratigraphy that correspond to major geological or paleontological events. It combines the disciplines of chronostratigraphy, which studies the relationships between rock sequences to determine their relative ages, and geochronology, the science of dating rocks and other geological materials.

=== Chronostratigraphy ===
Chronostratigraphy is the branch of stratigraphy that organises all the rocks of the Earth's crust into groups, known as chronostratigraphic units, based on their relative ages. A chronostratigraphic unit includes all rock sequences globally that were deposited during a particular time interval.

Chronostratigraphy uses several key principles to determine the relative relationships of rocks and thus their chronostratigraphic position in the rock record.

- The law of superposition that states that, in undeformed stratigraphic sequences, the oldest strata will lie at the bottom of the sequence, while newer material stacks upon the surface.
- The principle of original horizontality that states layers of sediments will originally be deposited horizontally under the action of gravity. However, it is now known that not all sedimentary layers are deposited purely horizontally, but this principle is still a useful concept.
- The principle of lateral continuity that states layers of sediments extend laterally in all directions until either thinning out or being cut off by a different rock layer, i.e. they are laterally continuous. Layers do not extend indefinitely; their limits are controlled by the amount and type of sediment in a sedimentary basin, and the geometry of that basin.
- The principle of cross-cutting relationships that states a rock that cuts across another rock must be younger than the rock it cuts across.
- The law of included fragments that states small fragments of one type of rock that are embedded in a second type of rock must have formed first, and were included when the second rock was forming.
- The relationships of unconformities which are geologic features representing a gap in the geologic record. Unconformities are formed during periods of erosion or non-deposition, indicating non-continuous sediment deposition. Observing the type and relationships of unconformities in strata allows geologist to understand the relative timing of the strata.
- The principle of faunal succession (where applicable) that states rock strata contain distinctive sets of fossils that succeed each other vertically in a specific and reliable order. This allows for a correlation of strata even when the horizon between them is not continuous.

=== Geochronology ===
Geochronology is the study of geological time. It uses quantitative measurements (geochronometry), such as radiometric dating, to provide precise ages, and relative methods of dating (e.g. paleomagnetism and stable isotope ratios) to establish a timeframe for events in Earth's history. A geochronologic unit is an interval of time during which a chronostratigraphic unit formed. For example, all the rocks of the Silurian System (a chronostratigraphic unit) were deposited during the Silurian Period (a geochronologic unit).

The age of a geochronologic unit can be refined and changed by improved dating techniques. However, the equivalent chronostratigraphic unit boundary remains unchanged. For example, in early 2022, the base of the Cambrian Period (a geochronologic unit) was revised from 541 Ma to 538.8 Ma but the rock definition of the boundary (GSSP) at the base of the Cambrian, and thus the boundary between the Ediacaran and Cambrian systems (chronostratigraphic units) has not been changed; rather, the absolute age has merely been refined.

=== Global Boundary Stratotype Section and Point (GSSP) ===
Historically, regional geologic time scales were used due to the litho- and biostratigraphic differences around the world in time equivalent rocks. The ICS has long worked to reconcile conflicting terminology by standardising globally significant and identifiable stratigraphic horizons that can be used to define the lower boundaries of chronostratigraphic units. A Global Boundary Stratotype Section and Point (GSSP) defines the lower boundary of a stage as being at a precise point in a specific rock succession in a particular geographic location. These reference points are known informally as "golden" spikes. All the beds above the spike belong to one time interval and all those below it to another. This allows beds of a similar age around the world to be correlated with the strata that contain the golden spike. For example, the iridium anomaly produced by the Chicxulub asteroid impact marks the lower boundary of the Paleogene System and thus the boundary between the Cretaceous and Paleogene. Whilst the GSSP is defined at Oued Djerfane in Tunisia, strata containing the iridium anomaly are found worldwide.

The Proterozoic (apart from the Ediacaran), Archean and Hadean are subdivided by absolute ages (Global Standard Stratigraphic Ages) rather than geological features. Proposals have been made to better reconcile these divisions with the rock record.

== Divisions of geologic time ==
The standard international units of the geologic time scale are published by the International Commission on Stratigraphy on the International Chronostratigraphic Chart. However, regional terms are still in use in some areas. The numeric values on the International Chronostratigraphic Chart are represented by the unit Ma (megaannum, for 'million years'). For example, 201.4 ± 0.2 Ma, the lower boundary of the Jurassic Period, is defined as 201,400,000 years old with an uncertainty of 200,000 years. Other SI prefix units commonly used by geologists are Ga (gigaannum, billion years), and ka (kiloannum, thousand years), with the latter often represented in calibrated units (before present).

The geologic time scale is divided into chronostratigraphic units and their corresponding geochronologic units:

- An eon is the largest geochronologic time unit and is equivalent to a chronostratigraphic eonothem. There are four formally defined eons: the Hadean, Archean, Proterozoic and Phanerozoic.
- An era is the second largest geochronologic time unit and is equivalent to a chronostratigraphic erathem. There are ten defined eras (with none in the Hadean eon): the Eoarchean, Paleoarchean, Mesoarchean, Neoarchean, Paleoproterozoic, Mesoproterozoic, Neoproterozoic, Paleozoic, Mesozoic and Cenozoic.
- A period is equivalent to a chronostratigraphic system. There are 22 defined periods, with the current being the Quaternary period. As an exception, two subperiods are used for the Carboniferous Period.
- An epoch is the second smallest geochronologic unit. It is equivalent to a chronostratigraphic series. There are 37 defined epochs and one informal one. The current epoch is the Holocene. There are also 11 subepochs which are all within the Neogene and Quaternary. The use of subepochs as formal units in international chronostratigraphy was ratified in 2022.
- An age is the smallest hierarchical geochronologic unit. It is equivalent to a chronostratigraphic stage. There are 96 formal and five informal ages. The current age is the Meghalayan.
- A chron is a non-hierarchical formal geochronology unit of unspecified rank and is equivalent to a chronostratigraphic chronozone. These correlate with magnetostratigraphic, lithostratigraphic, or biostratigraphic units as they are based on previously defined stratigraphic units or geologic features.

Formal, hierarchical units of the geologic time scale (largest to smallest)
Chronostratigraphic unit (strata)	Geochronologic unit (time)	Time span (Note: Time spans of geologic time units vary broadly, and there is no numeric limitation on the time span they can represent. They are limited by the time span of the higher rank unit they belong to, and to the chronostratigraphic boundaries they are defined by.)
Eonothem	Eon	Several hundred million years to two billion years
Erathem	Era	Tens to hundreds of millions of years
System	Period	Millions of years to tens of millions of years
Series	Epoch	Hundreds of thousands of years to tens of millions of years
Subseries	Subepoch	Thousands of years to millions of years
Stage	Age	Thousands of years to millions of years

The subdivisions Early and Late are used as the geochronologic equivalents of the chronostratigraphic Lower and Upper, e.g., Early Triassic Period (geochronologic unit) is used in place of Lower Triassic System (chronostratigraphic unit).

== Naming of geologic time ==
The names of geologic time units are defined for chronostratigraphic units with the corresponding geochronologic unit sharing the same name with a change to the suffix (e.g. Phanerozoic Eonothem becomes the Phanerozoic Eon). Names of erathems in the Phanerozoic were chosen to reflect major changes in the history of life on Earth: Paleozoic (old life), Mesozoic (middle life), and Cenozoic (new life). Names of systems are diverse in origin, with some indicating chronologic position (e.g., Paleogene), while others are named for lithology (e.g., Cretaceous), geography (e.g., Permian), or are tribal (e.g., Ordovician) in origin. Most currently recognised series and subseries are named for their position within a system/series (early/middle/late); however, the International Commission on Stratigraphy advocates for all new series and subseries to be named for a geographic feature in the vicinity of its stratotype or type locality. The name of stages should also be derived from a geographic feature in the locality of its stratotype or type locality.

Informally, the time before the Cambrian is often referred to as the Precambrian or pre-Cambrian (Supereon). (Note: Precambrian or pre-Cambrian is an informal geological term for time before the Cambrian period)

== History of the geologic time scale ==
=== Early history ===
The most modern geological time scale was not formulated until 1911 by Arthur Holmes (1890 – 1965), who drew inspiration from James Hutton (1726–1797), a Scottish Geologist who presented the idea of uniformitarianism or the theory that changes to the Earth's crust resulted from continuous and uniform processes. The broader concept of the relation between rocks and time can be traced back to (at least) the philosophers of Ancient Greece from 1200 BC to 600 AD. Xenophanes of Colophon (c. 570–487 BCE) observed rock beds with fossils of seashells located above the sea-level, viewed them as once living organisms, and used this to imply an unstable relationship in which the sea had at times transgressed over the land and at other times had regressed. This view was shared by a few of Xenophanes's scholars and those that followed, including Aristotle (384–322 BC) who (with additional observations) reasoned that the positions of land and sea had changed over long periods of time. The concept of deep time was also recognized by Chinese naturalist Shen Kuo (1031–1095) and Islamic scientist-philosophers, notably the Brothers of Purity, who wrote on the processes of stratification over the passage of time in their treatises. Their work likely inspired that of the 11th-century Persian polymath Avicenna (Ibn Sînâ, 980–1037) who wrote in The Book of Healing (1027) on the concept of stratification and superposition, pre-dating Nicolas Steno by more than six centuries. Avicenna also recognized fossils as "petrifications of the bodies of plants and animals", with the 13th-century Dominican bishop Albertus Magnus (c. 1200–1280), who drew from Aristotle's natural philosophy, extending this into a theory of a petrifying fluid. These works appeared to have little influence on scholars in Medieval Europe who looked to the Bible to explain the origins of fossils and sea-level changes, often attributing these to the 'Deluge', including Ristoro d'Arezzo in 1282. It was not until the Italian Renaissance when Leonardo da Vinci (1452–1519) would reinvigorate the relationships between stratification, relative sea-level change, and time, denouncing attribution of fossils to the 'Deluge':

Of the stupidity and ignorance of those who imagine that these creatures were carried to such places distant from the sea by the Deluge...Why do we find so many fragments and whole shells between the different layers of stone unless they had been upon the shore and had been covered over by earth newly thrown up by the sea which then became petrified? And if the above-mentioned Deluge had carried them to these places from the sea, you would find the shells at the edge of one layer of rock only, not at the edge of many where may be counted the winters of the years during which the sea multiplied the layers of sand and mud brought down by the neighbouring rivers and spread them over its shores. And if you wish to say that there must have been many deluges in order to produce these layers and the shells among them it would then become necessary for you to affirm that such a deluge took place every year.

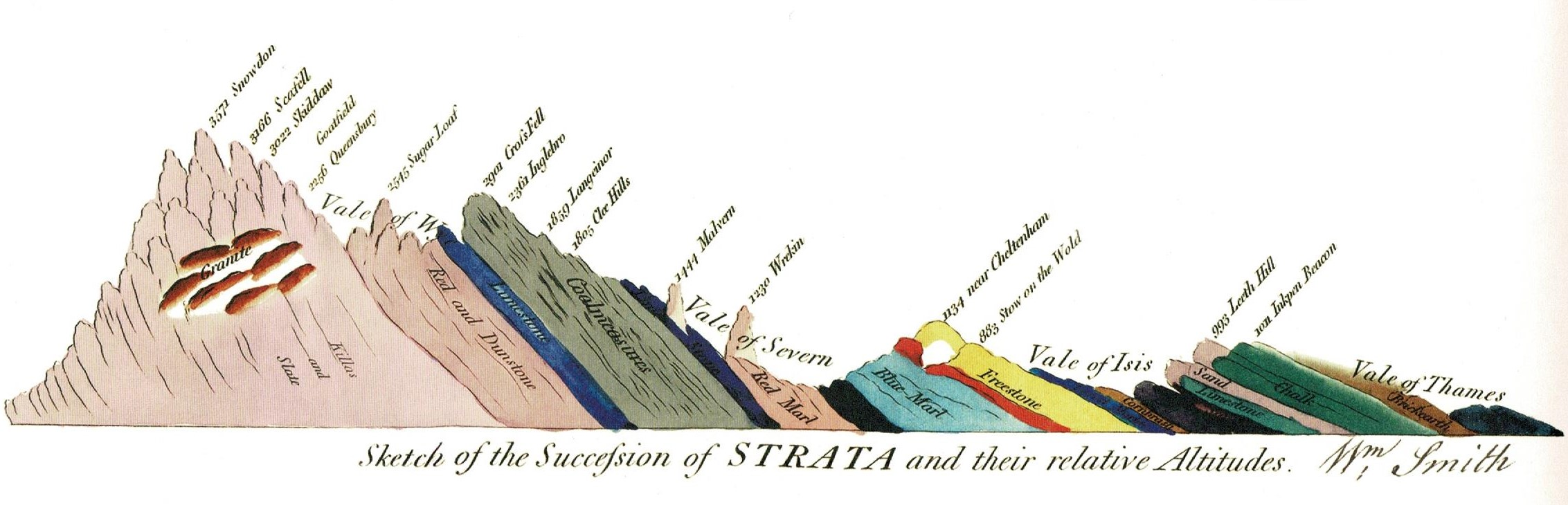
Sketch of the Succession of Strata and their Relative Altitudes (William Smith)

These views of da Vinci remained unpublished, and thus lacked influence at the time; however, questions of fossils and their significance were pursued and, while views against Genesis were not readily accepted and dissent from religious doctrine was in some places unwise, scholars such as Girolamo Fracastoro shared da Vinci's views, and found the attribution of fossils to the 'Deluge' absurd. Although many theories surrounding philosophy and concepts of rocks were developed in earlier years, "the first serious attempts to formulate a geological time scale that could be applied anywhere on Earth were made in the late 18th century." Later, in the 19th century, academics further developed theories on stratification. William Smith, often referred to as the "Father of Geology" developed theories through observations rather than drawing from the scholars that came before him. Smith's work was primarily based on his detailed study of rock layers and fossils during his time and he created "the first map to depict so many rock formations over such a large area". After studying rock layers and the fossils they contained, Smith concluded that each layer of rock contained distinct material that could be used to identify and correlate rock layers across different regions of the world. Smith developed the concept of faunal succession or the idea that fossils can serve as a marker for the age of the strata they are found in and published his ideas in his 1816 book, "Strata identified by organized fossils."

=== Establishment of primary principles ===
Niels Stensen, more commonly known as Nicolas Steno (1638–1686), is credited with establishing four of the guiding principles of stratigraphy. In De solido intra solidum naturaliter contento dissertationis prodromus Steno states:

- When any given stratum was being formed, all the matter resting on it was fluid and, therefore, when the lowest stratum was being formed, none of the upper strata existed.
- ... strata which are either perpendicular to the horizon or inclined to it were at one time parallel to the horizon.
- When any given stratum was being formed, it was either encompassed at its edges by another solid substance or it covered the whole globe of the earth. Hence, it follows that wherever bared edges of strata are seen, either a continuation of the same strata must be looked for or another solid substance must be found that kept the material of the strata from being dispersed.
- If a body or discontinuity cuts across a stratum, it must have formed after that stratum.

Respectively, these are the principles of superposition, original horizontality, lateral continuity, and cross-cutting relationships. From this Steno reasoned that strata were laid down in succession and inferred relative time (in Steno's belief, time from Creation). While Steno's principles were simple and attracted much attention, applying them proved challenging. These basic principles, albeit with improved and more nuanced interpretations, still form the foundational principles of determining the correlation of strata relative to geologic time.

Over the course of the 18th-century geologists realised that:

- Sequences of strata often become eroded, distorted, tilted, or even inverted after deposition
- Strata laid down at the same time in different areas could have entirely different appearances
- The strata of any given area represented only part of Earth's long history

=== Formulation of a modern geologic time scale ===
The apparent, earliest formal division of the geologic record with respect to time was introduced during the era of Biblical models by Thomas Burnet who applied a two-fold terminology to mountains by identifying "montes primarii" for rock formed at the time of the 'Deluge', and younger "monticulos secundarios" formed later from the debris of the "primarii". Anton Moro (1687–1784) also used primary and secondary divisions for rock units but his mechanism was volcanic. In this early version of the Plutonism theory, the interior of Earth was seen as hot, and this drove the creation of primary igneous and metamorphic rocks and secondary rocks formed contorted and fossiliferous sediments. These primary and secondary divisions were expanded on by Giovanni Targioni Tozzetti (1712–1783) and Giovanni Arduino (1713–1795) to include tertiary and quaternary divisions. These divisions were used to describe both the time during which the rocks were laid down, and the collection of rocks themselves (i.e., it was correct to say Tertiary rocks, and Tertiary Period). Only the Quaternary division is retained in the modern geologic time scale, while the Tertiary division was in use until the early 21st century. The Neptunism and Plutonism theories would compete into the early 19th century with a key driver for resolution of this debate being the work of James Hutton (1726–1797), in particular his Theory of the Earth, first presented before the Royal Society of Edinburgh in 1785. Hutton's theory would later become known as uniformitarianism, popularised by John Playfair (1748–1819) and later Charles Lyell (1797–1875) in his Principles of Geology. Their theories strongly contested the 6,000 year age of the Earth as suggested determined by James Ussher via Biblical chronology that was accepted at the time by western religion. Instead, using geological evidence, they contested Earth to be much older, cementing the concept of deep time.

During the early 19th century William Smith, Georges Cuvier, Jean d'Omalius d'Halloy, and Alexandre Brongniart pioneered the systematic division of rocks by stratigraphy and fossil assemblages. These geologists began to use the local names given to rock units in a wider sense, correlating strata across national and continental boundaries based on their similarity to each other. Many of the names below erathem/era rank in use on the modern ICC/GTS were determined during the early to mid-19th century.

=== The advent of geochronometry ===
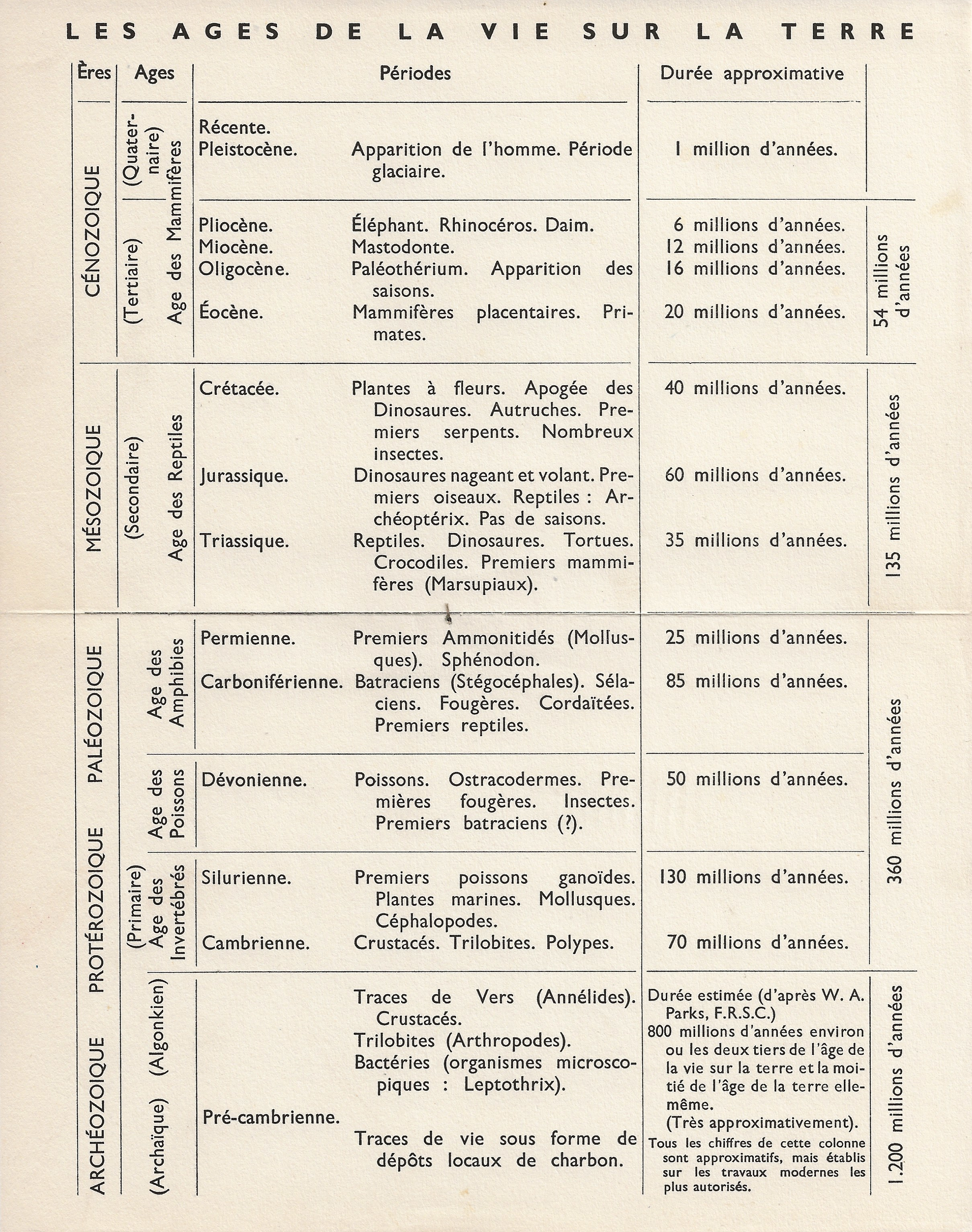
One example of an obsolete geological time scale (France, mid-1940s).

During the 19th century, the debate regarding Earth's age was renewed, with geologists estimating ages based on denudation rates and sedimentary thicknesses or ocean chemistry, and physicists determining ages for the cooling of the Earth or the Sun using basic thermodynamics or orbital physics. These estimations varied from 15,000 million years to 0.075 million years depending on method and author, but the estimations of Lord Kelvin and Clarence King were held in high regard at the time due to their pre-eminence in physics and geology. All of these early geochronometric determinations would later prove to be incorrect.

The discovery of radioactive decay by Henri Becquerel, Marie Curie, and Pierre Curie laid the ground work for radiometric dating, but the knowledge and tools required for accurate determination of radiometric ages would not be in place until the mid-1950s. Early attempts at determining ages of uranium minerals and rocks by Ernest Rutherford, Bertram Boltwood, Robert Strutt, and Arthur Holmes, would culminate in what are considered the first international geological time scales by Holmes in 1911 and 1913. The discovery of isotopes in 1913 by Frederick Soddy, and the developments in mass spectrometry pioneered by Francis William Aston, Arthur Jeffrey Dempster, and Alfred O. C. Nier during the early to mid-20th century would finally allow for the accurate determination of radiometric ages, with Holmes publishing several revisions to his geological time-scale with his final version in 1960.

=== Modern international geological time scale ===
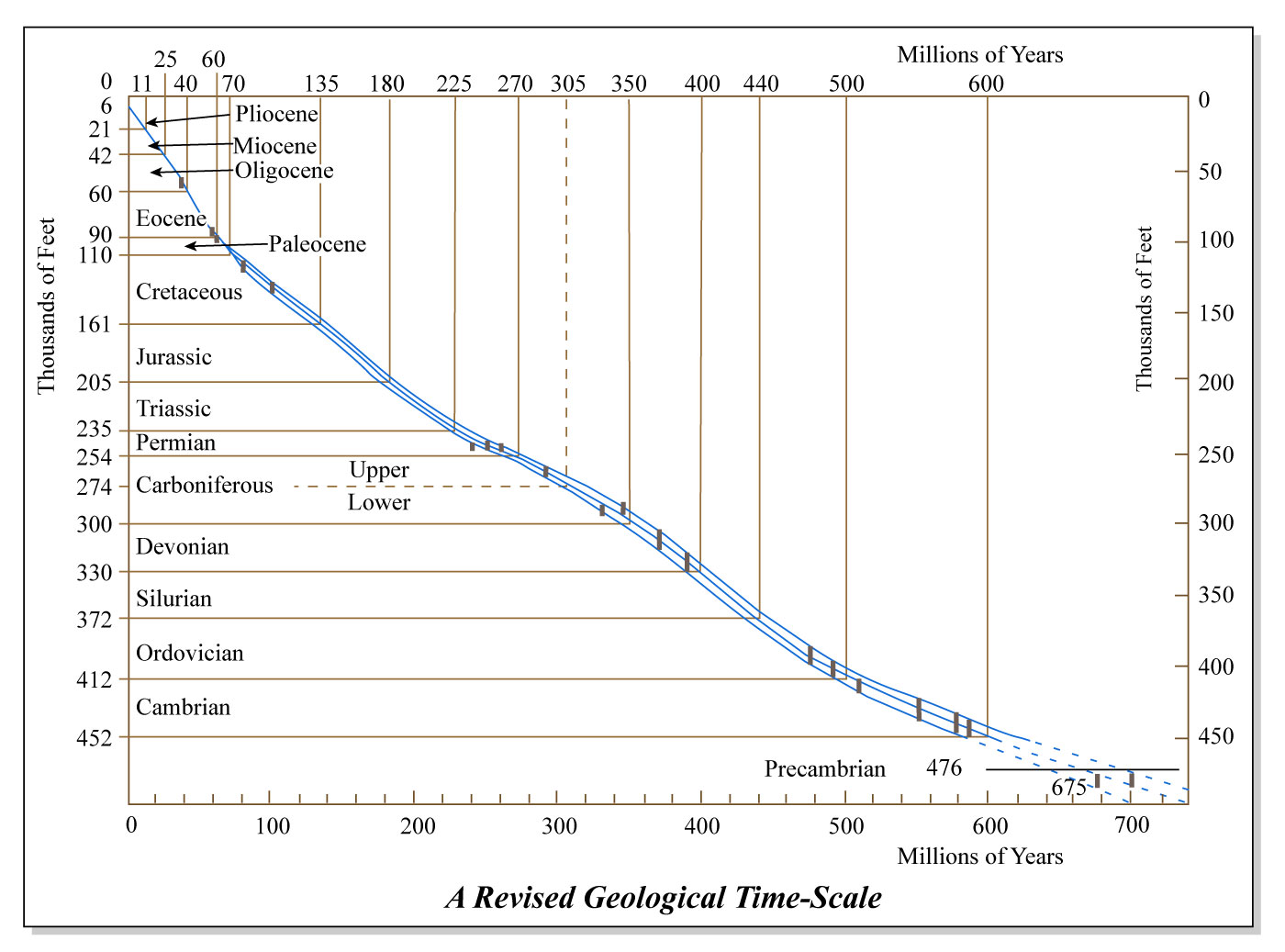
Graph maps depth in sediment layers to the geological time interval during which each layer formed. Deeper layers correspond to older times.

The establishment of the IUGS in 1961 and acceptance of the Commission on Stratigraphy (applied in 1965) to become a member commission of IUGS led to the founding of the ICS. One of the primary objectives of the ICS is "the establishment, publication and revision of the ICS International Chronostratigraphic Chart which is the standard, reference global Geological Time Scale to include the ratified Commission decisions".

Following on from Holmes, several A Geological Time Scale books were published in 1982, 1989, 2004, 2008, 2012, 2016, and 2020. However, since 2013, the ICS has taken responsibility for producing and distributing the ICC citing the commercial nature, independent creation, and lack of oversight by the ICS on the prior published GTS versions (GTS books prior to 2013) although these versions were published in close association with the ICS. Subsequent Geologic Time Scale books (2016 and 2020) are commercial publications with no oversight from the ICS, and do not entirely conform to the chart produced by the ICS. The ICS produced GTS charts are versioned (year/month) beginning at v2013/01. At least one new version is published each year incorporating any changes ratified by the ICS since the prior version.

The following five timelines show the geologic time scale to scale. The first shows the entire time from the formation of Earth to the present, but this gives little space for the most recent eon. The second timeline shows an expanded view of the most recent eon. In a similar way, the most recent era is expanded in the third timeline, the most recent period is expanded in the fourth timeline, and the most recent epoch is expanded in the fifth timeline.

(Horizontal scale is millions of years for the above timelines; thousands of years for the timeline below)

== Table of geologic time ==
The following table summarises the major events and characteristics of the divisions making up the geologic time scale of Earth. This table is arranged with the most recent geologic periods at the top, and the oldest at the bottom. The height of each table entry does not correspond to the duration of each subdivision of time. As such, this table is not to scale and does not accurately represent the relative time-spans of each geochronologic unit. While the Phanerozoic Eon looks longer than the rest, it merely spans ~538.8 Ma (~11.8% of Earth's history), whilst the previous three eons collectively span ~4,028.2 Ma (~88.2% of Earth's history). This bias toward the most recent eon is in part due to the relative lack of information about events that occurred during the first three eons compared to the current eon (the Phanerozoic). The use of subseries/subepochs has been ratified by the ICS.

While some regional terms are still in use, the table of geologic time conforms to the nomenclature, ages, and colour codes set forth by the International Commission on Stratigraphy in the official International Chronostratigraphic Chart.

Eonothem/ Eon	Erathem/ Era	System/ Period	Series/ Epoch	Stage/ Age	Major events	Start, million years ago (Note: The dates and uncertainties quoted are according to the International Commission on Stratigraphy International Chronostratigraphic chart (v2024/12). An ^{*} indicates boundaries where a Global Boundary Stratotype Section and Point has been internationally agreed.)
Phanerozoic	Cenozoic (Note: The Tertiary is a now obsolete geologic system/period spanning from 66 Ma to 2.6 Ma. It has no exact equivalent in the modern ICC, but is approximately equivalent to the merged Palaeogene and Neogene systems/periods.)	Quaternary	Holocene	Meghalayan	4.2 ka cool period, dry climate leads to decline of agriculture-related civilisations in Egypt, Mesopotamia and India. Medieval Warm Period (about 900 - 1350 CE) and Little Ice Age (about 1400 to 1900 CE). Rapidly warming climate as CO_{2} added to atmosphere from burning fossil fuels.	0.0042 ^{*}
Phanerozoic	Cenozoic	Quaternary	Holocene	Northgrippian	8.2 ka cool period, followed by warming climate with melting ice raising sea levels. Doggerland and Sundaland flooded.	0.0082 ^{*}
Phanerozoic	Cenozoic	Quaternary	Holocene	Greenlandian	Younger Dryas and Last Glacial Period end. Rise of agriculture. Extinction of Pleistocene megafauna.	0.0117 ^{*}
Phanerozoic	Cenozoic	Quaternary	Pleistocene	Upper/Late ('Tarantian')	Eemian Interglacial Stage followed by the Last Glacial Period. After Last Glacial Maximum (about 25 – 15 ka) climate begins to warm. Younger Dryas final cold period of ice age. Toba supervolcano eruption. Homo sapiens spread across the globe. Homo floresiensis live on island of Flores. Homo neanderthalensis go extinct.	0.129
Phanerozoic	Cenozoic	Quaternary	Pleistocene	Chibanian	Brunhes–Matuyama geomagnetic reversal event. Homo heidelbergensis evolves in Africa and spreads to Europe. Homo neanderthalensis appear in western Eurasia. Homo sapiens evolve in Africa. Homo erectus and Homo heidelbergensis die out.	0.774 ^{*}
Phanerozoic	Cenozoic	Quaternary	Pleistocene	Calabrian	Mid Pleistocene transition: glacial/interglacial frequency slows to every 100,000 years. Glacial periods now long enough for continental ice-sheets beyond polar regions. Chimpanzees and bonobos diverge. Homo erectus spreads through Eurasia. Homo habilis goes extinct.	1.8 ^{*}
Phanerozoic	Cenozoic	Quaternary	Pleistocene	Gelasian	Start of Pleistocene Ice Age: 40,000 year cycles of glacials/interglacials with ice cap growth and retreat, and sea level falls and rises. Rise of Pleistocene megafauna. Homo habilis and Homo erectus evolve in Africa.	2.58 ^{*}
Phanerozoic	Cenozoic	Neogene	Pliocene	Piacenzian	Isthmus of Panama land bridge forms between North and South America blocking equatorial ocean currents between Atlantic and Pacific oceans. Gulf Stream develops as Atlantic waters divert northward. Global temperatures warm melting polar ice caps and sea levels rise flooding continental margins. Temperatures drop at 2.7 Ma and the Pleistocene Ice Age begins. First modern big cats and modern horses. Tortoises and finch-billed tanagers arrive in the Galapagos. Earliest humans appear.	3.6 ^{*}
Phanerozoic	Cenozoic	Neogene	Pliocene	Zanclean	Straits of Gibraltar form as Atlantic waters flood the Mediterranean Sea basin (Zanclean flood). Global climate continues to cool. Asian elephants appear. Hominins Ardipithecus, Australopithecus and Paranthropus evolve.	5.333 ^{*}
Phanerozoic	Cenozoic	Neogene	Miocene	Messinian	Connection between Mediterranean Sea and Atlantic is blocked, resulting in Messinian salinity crisis with evaporites accumulating across Mediterranean as its waters dry up. Collision of Banda Arc with Australia and Timor begins. Global climate cools and permanent ice cap forms in Arctic. Sea levels drop as ice sheets grow. Spread of C4 grasses result in extinction of many herbivores. Sea snakes evolve. Gorilla-human-chimpanzee lineages split, then chimpanzees and humans diverge. Earliest hominid Sahelanthropus.	7.246 ^{*}
Phanerozoic	Cenozoic	Neogene	Miocene	Tortonian		11.63 ^{*}
Phanerozoic	Cenozoic	Neogene	Miocene	Serravallian	Australia begins to collide with Southeast Asia, blocking equatorial circulation between western Pacific and Indian Oceans. Antarctic ice cap shrinks as global temperatures warm (Middle Miocene climatic optimum). Last creodonts (early predatory mammals) become extinct. Megalodon (giant shark) evolves.	13.82 ^{*}
Phanerozoic	Cenozoic	Neogene	Miocene	Langhian	Australia begins to collide with Southeast Asia, blocking equatorial circulation between western Pacific and Indian Oceans. Antarctic ice cap shrinks as global temperatures warm (Middle Miocene climatic optimum). Last creodonts (early predatory mammals) become extinct. Megalodon (giant shark) evolves.	15.98 ^{*}
Phanerozoic	Cenozoic	Neogene	Miocene	Burdigalian	The Tian Shan and Altai Mountains, Central Asia, form (Himalayan orogeny). Columbia River Basalt large igneous province (LIP) eruptions above rising Yellowstone hotspot, North America. Climate continues to cool. Compositae (herbaceous plants) appear and rapidly diversify, triggering evolutionary radiations in rodents, snakes (first vipers appear) and songbirds. First gibbons and orangutans. First modern dolphins.	20.45
Phanerozoic	Cenozoic	Neogene	Miocene	Aquitanian	The Tian Shan and Altai Mountains, Central Asia, form (Himalayan orogeny). Columbia River Basalt large igneous province (LIP) eruptions above rising Yellowstone hotspot, North America. Climate continues to cool. Compositae (herbaceous plants) appear and rapidly diversify, triggering evolutionary radiations in rodents, snakes (first vipers appear) and songbirds. First gibbons and orangutans. First modern dolphins.	23.04 ^{*}
Phanerozoic	Cenozoic	Paleogene	Oligocene	Chattian	North America and Eurasia plate boundary established along Mid-Atlantic Ridge. Central American volcanic arc begins to collide with South America. East African LIP eruptions begin as Afar mantle plume rises. Late Cenozoic Ice Age begins. Rapid growth of the Antarctic ice cap produces major drop in global sea levels. Grasslands and prairies thrive as climate dries. Paraceratherium largest ever land mammal flourishes. First felids (cats), mustelids (e.g. weasels, otters, badgers), and pinnipeds (seals, sea lions and walruses). Whales split into toothed and filter feeders. Multituberculates (rat-like early mammals) go extinct.	27.3 ^{*}
Phanerozoic	Cenozoic	Paleogene	Oligocene	Rupelian		33.9 ^{*}
Phanerozoic	Cenozoic	Paleogene	Eocene	Priabonian	Subduction in the Mediterranean leads to Tell-Rif-Betic, Dinarides, Hellenides and Taurides (Alpine) orogenies. Eurekan orogeny, Greenland. Zagros orogeny as Arabia and Eurasia collide. Laramide orogeny ends. Gulf of Aden forms between Africa and Asia. Cooling climate with brief warm period. End Eocene Australia and South America move away from Antarctica opening Drake and Tasmanian passages. Antarctic Circumpolar current forms. Rapid drop in global temperatures. Ice sheets on Antarctica. Canids (wolves and foxes), Catarrhine primates (Old World monkeys and apes), and raptors evolve. Basilosaurus is first fully aquatic whale.	37.71 ^{*}
Phanerozoic	Cenozoic	Paleogene	Eocene	Bartonian		41.03
Phanerozoic	Cenozoic	Paleogene	Eocene	Lutetian		48.07 ^{*}
Phanerozoic	Cenozoic	Paleogene	Eocene	Ypresian	Greenland separates from Eurasia and Eurasian Basin opens in Arctic. Greater India collides with southern Eurasia, beginning Himalayan orogeny. North Atlantic LIP eruptions continue. Major reorganisation of plate motions across Pacific region initiates Izu-Bonin-Mariana and Tonga-Kermadec subduction zones. Greenhouse temperatures continue from Paleocene-Eocene Thermal Maximum (PETM) as climate affected by North Atlantic LIP eruptions, but global cooling begins from about 50 Ma with changing paleogeography and oceanography conditions. Angiosperms (flowering plants) evolve larger fruits. First songbirds, parrots and woodpeckers. Primates divide into strepsirrhines (lemurs and lorises) and haplorhines (tarsiers and anthropoids). Artiodactyls (even-toed ungulates) appear and split into Cetruminantia (ruminants, whales and dolphins), Suina (pigs), and Tylopoda (camels and relatives). First Carnivora (meat-eating mammals). Mice, rats, bats and tapirs appear. Eohippus earliest member of horse family. Marsupials reach Australia.	56 ^{*}
Phanerozoic	Cenozoic	Paleogene	Paleocene	Thanetian	Alpine orogeny develops as Neotethys closes and Africa begins collision with Eurasia. Pyrenean and Laramide orogenies continue. India drifts rapidly northwards. North Atlantic LIP eruptions start as Proto-Icelandic mantle plume rises. Subduction zones form along margins of Caribbean plate. Bering Straits land bridge present during low sea level periods. Chicxulub impact causes "impact winter", then climate warms with final eruption of the Deccan Traps before cool, dry conditions re-established. Rapid rise in global temperatures at onset of PETM due to North Atlantic LIP eruptions. End-Cretaceous mass extinction about 75% of plant and animal species go extinct, including ammonoids, rudist molluscs, non-avian dinosaurs, plesiosaurs, mosasaurs and pterosaurs. Mammals evolve quickly filling vacant ecological niches, modern groups of birds diversify and angiosperms become dominant form of plant life. First earthworms and land turtles. Phorusrhacidae (terror birds) and creodonts (early predatory mammals) evolve. Perissodactyls (odd-toed ungulates) appear and diversify. First primates, proboscideans (elephants), Xenartha (sloths, anteaters and armadillos) and rodents.	59.24 ^{*}
Phanerozoic	Cenozoic	Paleogene	Paleocene	Selandian		61.66 ^{*}
Phanerozoic	Cenozoic	Paleogene	Paleocene	Danian		66 ^{*}
Phanerozoic	Mesozoic	Cretaceous	Upper/Late	Maastrichtian	Pangaea continues to fragment. Africa and South America separate as seafloor spreading established in South Atlantic. India and Australia move away from Antarctica, and India separates from Madagascar. Central Atlantic propagates north. Pyrenean orogeny begins as Iberia rotates relative to Eurasia. Africa moves northwards. Sevier and Laramide orogenies, western North America. LIP eruptions include: Ontong Java-Nui; Kerguelen; High Arctic and Deccan Traps. Highest sea levels in the Phanerozoic, shallow seas extend across large areas of the continents. Greenhouse climate global average temperature peaks c. 28 °C in the Cenomanian-Turonian. Tropical plants and dinosaurs on Antarctica and above Arctic Circle. Oceanic anoxic events (OAEs) result in widespread deposition of organic-rich black shales. Calcareous foraminifera and coccolithophores flourish forming massive chalk deposits. Teleost (bony fish) radiate. Predators grow large: plesiosaurs and mosasaurs in the sea; carcharodontosaurs and tyrannosaurs on land. Modern lobsters, crabs, shrimps and crocodiles appear. First bees, termites, ants, fleas, mantids and snakes. Angiosperms (flowering plants) proliferate and develop symbiotic relationships with insects. First grasses. Woody angiosperms evolve including rose, magnolia and sycamore families. First marsupials and monotremes. End of the Cretaceous is marked by the Chicxulub impact event and the Cretaceous-Paleogene mass extinction.	72.2 ± 0.2 ^{*}
Phanerozoic	Mesozoic	Cretaceous	Upper/Late	Campanian		83.6 ± 0.2 ^{*}
Phanerozoic	Mesozoic	Cretaceous	Upper/Late	Santonian		85.7 ± 0.2 ^{*}
Phanerozoic	Mesozoic	Cretaceous	Upper/Late	Coniacian		89.8 ± 0.3 ^{*}
Phanerozoic	Mesozoic	Cretaceous	Upper/Late	Turonian		93.9 ± 0.2 ^{*}
Phanerozoic	Mesozoic	Cretaceous	Upper/Late	Cenomanian		100.5 ± 0.1 ^{*}
Phanerozoic	Mesozoic	Cretaceous	Lower/Early	Albian		~113.2 ± 0.3 ^{*}
Phanerozoic	Mesozoic	Cretaceous	Lower/Early	Aptian		~121.4 ± 0.6
Phanerozoic	Mesozoic	Cretaceous	Lower/Early	Barremian		~125.77 ^{*}
Phanerozoic	Mesozoic	Cretaceous	Lower/Early	Hauterivian		~132.6 ± 0.6 ^{*}
Phanerozoic	Mesozoic	Cretaceous	Lower/Early	Valanginian		~137.05 ± 0.2 ^{*}
Phanerozoic	Mesozoic	Cretaceous	Lower/Early	Berriasian		~143.1 ± 0.6
Phanerozoic	Mesozoic	Jurassic	Upper/Late	Tithonian	Seafloor spreading in the Central Atlantic between North America and Africa-South America begins break up of Pangaea. Rifting continues in northern Atlantic and Caribbean. Gondwana splits into East and West Gondwana as Somali and Mozambique basins open. Pacific plate forms in central Panthalassa. Cimmerian and Indosinian orogenies continue. Start of Andean tectonic cycle, South America. Nevadan orogeny, North America. Mongol-Okhotsk Ocean closes forming Verkhoyansk-Kolyma mountain belt, Siberia. Neotethys narrows. Greenhouse climate with warmer and cooler periods. Arid conditions across equatorial and subtropical regions; coal and bauxite deposits in wetter temperate belts. Emplacement of Karoo-Ferrar LIP leads to global warming and the widespread Toarcian oceanic anoxic event. Rise in global sea levels. Change from aragonite to calcite seas. First large reefs. Phytoplankton and dinoflagellates diversify. First coccolithophores. Ammonoids and bellomnoids proliferate. Major radiation of sharks. Vieraella earliest true frog. First modern turtles. Cycads dominant forest flora. Also ferns, conifers and ginkgos. Dinosaurs rise to dominance, mammals remain small. First Ornithischia (e.g. stegasaurs and ceratopsians). Sauropods evolve into giants, including brachiosaurs, titanosaurs, and diplodocids. First ceratosaurs, megalosaurs, allosaurs, and coelurosaurs theropods. Coelurosaurs, many with feathers, include early tyrannosaurs and maniraptorans (ancestors of birds). First pterodactyloids.	149.2 ± 0.7
Phanerozoic	Mesozoic	Jurassic	Upper/Late	Kimmeridgian		154.8 ± 0.8 ^{*}
Phanerozoic	Mesozoic	Jurassic	Upper/Late	Oxfordian		161.5 ± 1.0
Phanerozoic	Mesozoic	Jurassic	Middle	Callovian		165.3 ± 1.1
Phanerozoic	Mesozoic	Jurassic	Middle	Bathonian		168.2 ± 1.2 ^{*}
Phanerozoic	Mesozoic	Jurassic	Middle	Bajocian		170.9 ± 0.8 ^{*}
Phanerozoic	Mesozoic	Jurassic	Middle	Aalenian		174.7 ± 0.8 ^{*}
Phanerozoic	Mesozoic	Jurassic	Lower/Early	Toarcian		184.2 ± 0.3 ^{*}
Phanerozoic	Mesozoic	Jurassic	Lower/Early	Pliensbachian		192.9 ± 0.3 ^{*}
Phanerozoic	Mesozoic	Jurassic	Lower/Early	Sinemurian		199.5 ± 0.3 ^{*}
Phanerozoic	Mesozoic	Jurassic	Lower/Early	Hettangian		201.4 ± 0.2 ^{*}
Phanerozoic	Mesozoic	Triassic	Upper/Late	Rhaetian	Pangaea forms an arc extending from almost pole to pole. Siberian Traps eruptions wane, but hot house climate continues. Cimmerian terranes collide with Eurasia: Indosinian orogeny in east; Cimmerian orogeny in west. Sonoma (western Laurussia), and Hunter-Bowen (Australia) orogenies continue. Late Triassic, emplacement of the Central Atlantic magmatic province (CAMP) followed by seafloor spreading marks start of Pangaea break up. Archosaurs divide into pseudosuchia (crocodiles), and ornithodirans (dinosaurs and pterosaurs). Mammaliaformes evolve from cynodonts. Evidence of endothermy (warm-bloodedness) in dinosaurs and mammals. First teleosts (modern ray-finned fish). Ichthyosaurs, and sauropterygians plesiosaurs, nothosaurs, placodonts) appear. First scleractinian (hard coral) reefs. First wasps and stick insects. Late Triassic eruptions of Wrangellia LIP raises temperatures, intensifies Pangaea monsoons and increases rainfall (Carnian pluvial episode). Bennettitales, modern ferns and conifers appear. First Lepidoptera (moths and butterflies). Modern groups of phytoplankton appear. Manicouagan bolide impact reduces global temperatures, before CAMP eruptions increases them and triggers Triassic-Jurassic mass extinction. Major loss of reef ecosystems, reduction in marine genera, conodonts die out. Major changes in terrestrial flora. Loss of vertebrate genera, including non-mammalian therapsids. Crocodylomorphs only pseudosuchians to survive.	~205.7
Phanerozoic	Mesozoic	Triassic	Upper/Late	Norian		~227.3
Phanerozoic	Mesozoic	Triassic	Upper/Late	Carnian		~237 ^{*}
Phanerozoic	Mesozoic	Triassic	Middle	Ladinian		~241.464 ^{*}
Phanerozoic	Mesozoic	Triassic	Middle	Anisian		247
Phanerozoic	Mesozoic	Triassic	Lower/Early	Olenekian		250.8
Phanerozoic	Mesozoic	Triassic	Lower/Early	Induan		251.902 ± 0.024 ^{*}
Phanerozoic	Paleozoic	Permian	Lopingian	Changhsingian	Pangaea at its maximum extent. Ural and Alleghanian orogenies continue. Hunter-Bowen orogeny, eastern Australia; Sonoma orogeny, western Laurussia. Kazakhstania and Tarim collide with Siberia. Orogenic collapse of Variscan orogeny and early extension along the lines of the future Atlantic, Indian and Southern Oceans. Opening of Neo-Tethys Ocean as Cimmerian terranes rift from northeast Gondwana. Late Paleozoic Ice Age wanes and humid, icehouse climate give way to arid, greenhouse conditions. Global average temperatures rise from c. 12° to over 30° at Permo-Triassic boundary. Desert dune sands and evaporites dominate interior of Pangea. Coal swamps at high latitudes and humid coastal regions. Mosses, Coleoptera (beetles) and Diptera (two-winged flies) appear. Diapsids split into archosaurs (crocodiles and dinosaurs) and lepidosaurs (lizards and snakes). First marine reptiles. Therapsids and cynodonts evolve from synapsids. Guadalupian-Lopingian boundary mass extinction linked to eruption of Emeishan LIP, South China. At the Permo-Triassic boundary, eruption of the Siberian Traps LIP releases vast amounts of CO_{2} leading to extreme global warming, and the end-Permian mass extinction. Anoxic waters from the deep ocean move up to the shallows, eliminating trilobites, rugose and tabulate corals, and placoderms. Brachiopods, ammonoids, sharks, bony fish, and crinoids see major reductions. On land, forests disappear. Palaeodictyopterida and many insect groups go extinct, as do all non-therapsid synapsids and most therapsid genera.	254.14 ± 0.07 ^{*}
Phanerozoic	Paleozoic	Permian	Lopingian	Wuchiapingian		259.857 ± 0.21 ^{*}
Phanerozoic	Paleozoic	Permian	Guadalupian	Capitanian		264.28 ± 0.16 ^{*}
Phanerozoic	Paleozoic	Permian	Guadalupian	Wordian		266.9 ± 0.4 ^{*}
Phanerozoic	Paleozoic	Permian	Guadalupian	Roadian		274.4 ± 0.4 ^{*}
Phanerozoic	Paleozoic	Permian	Cisuralian	Kungurian		283.3 ± 0.4
Phanerozoic	Paleozoic	Permian	Cisuralian	Artinskian		290.1 ± 0.26 ^{*}
Phanerozoic	Paleozoic	Permian	Cisuralian	Sakmarian		293.52 ± 0.17 ^{*}
Phanerozoic	Paleozoic	Permian	Cisuralian	Asselian		298.9 ± 0.15 ^{*}
Phanerozoic	Paleozoic	Carboniferous (Note: The Mississippian and Pennsylvanian are official sub-systems/sub-periods.)	Pennsylvanian (Note: This is divided into Lower/Early, Middle, and Upper/Late series/epochs)	Gzhelian	Continuation of the Variscan orogeny (Ouachita and Alleghanian orogenies) with growth of the Central Pangean Mountains. Ural orogeny continues with continental collision between Kazakhstania and Laurussia. Humid, coal swamps form in foreland basins of the Central Pangean Mountains and around North and South China cratons. As the Late Paleozoic icehouse (LPIA) continues, waxing and waning of ice sheets causes rapid changes in global sea level, flooding these regions and depositing cyclothem sequences. Atmospheric oxygen levels rise to over 25% before decreasing again. Appearance of aragonite reef builders, including algae and sponges. Freshwater Eurypterids (sea scorpions). On land, Neoptera appear, and Miomoptera show earliest evidence for complete metamorphosis. First true terrestrial amphibians. Amniotes appear and split into two groups: sauropsids (reptiles) and synapsids (mammals). Lepidodendron and Sigillaria lycopod trees dominate coal swamps, with smaller sphenopsids (horsetails) and seed ferns between. Gymnosperms, including conifers and cycads grow on drier ground. LPIA peaks at Carboniferous-Permian boundary. A drop in CO_{2} levels and increase in arid conditions leads to change in woodland vegetation (Carboniferous rainforest collapse).	303.7
Phanerozoic	Paleozoic	Carboniferous	Pennsylvanian	Kasimovian		307 ± 0.1
Phanerozoic	Paleozoic	Carboniferous	Pennsylvanian	Moscovian		315.2 ± 0.2
Phanerozoic	Paleozoic	Carboniferous	Pennsylvanian	Bashkirian		323.4 ± 0.4 ^{*}
Phanerozoic	Paleozoic	Carboniferous	Mississippian	Serpukhovian	Continents form a near circle around the opening Paleo-Tethys Ocean. Gondwana forms the southern to southwestern margin; Laurussia the west; Siberia, Amuria and Kazakhstania the north; North and South China the northeast; and, Annamia the eastern margin. The terranes collide with southeastern Laurussia during the Variscan orogeny. Antler orogeny continues, and opening of the Slide Mountain Ocean along western margin of Laurussia. Closure of Ural Ocean between Kazakhstania and Laurussia during the Ural orogeny. Development of Altai accretionary complexes along north and eastern margin of the Paleo-Tethys. Main phase of LPIA begins. Drop in global sea levels, extensive glaciation across Gondwana. Increasing atmospheric oxygen levels. Change from calcite to aragonite seas. Evolutionary radiations after the Late Devonian extinctions include brachiopods, bivalves, echinoderms, ammonoids, gastropods, sharks and ray-finned bony fish. Placoderms and graptolites die out. Proetida only group of trilobites. First freshwater molluscs and sharks. Arthropleura (millipede) largest ever terrestrial arthropod. First flying insects Paleodictyopora. Fish-like (Pederpes) and semi-aquatic tetrapods (Eucritta) appear on land. Seedless vascular plants and seed ferns diversify.	330.3 ± 0.4
Phanerozoic	Paleozoic	Carboniferous	Mississippian	Viséan		346.7 ± 0.4 ^{*}
Phanerozoic	Paleozoic	Carboniferous	Mississippian	Tournaisian		358.86 ± 0.19 ^{*}
Phanerozoic	Paleozoic	Devonian	Upper/Late	Famennian	Paleo-Tethys continues to open as the Armorican Terrane Assemblage (ATA) drifts north and Annamia-South China moves away from Gondwana. Rheic Ocean closes as ATA collides with Laurussia beginning the Variscan orogeny. Other orogenies: Antler, Ellesmerian, and Acadian (Laurussia); Achalian (Argentina); Tabberabberan/Lachlan (Australia); Ross (Antarctica); Kazakh (Kazakhstania). Period of high sea-levels, greenhouse conditions but decreasing atmospheric CO_{2} levels and slowly cooling climate with glaciations towards end. Vascular plants increase in size, develop large root systems and spread to upland areas. First forests, seed plants, and modern soil orders appear (alfisols and ultisols). Growth of massive reef systems. Major radiation of jawed fish with appearance of ray-finned, lobe-finned, and cartilaginous fish. Appearance of tetrapods (evolved from lobe-finned fish). Early amphibians move on to land. First ammonoids. Emplacement of the Viley and Pripyat–Dniepr–Donets large igneous provinces coincide with global marine anoxic events and the Kellwasser (c. 372 Ma) and Hangenberg (c. 359 Ma) mass extinctions. Kellwasser extinction: c. 20% of families and c. 50% of genera of marine invertebrates lost. Tabulate coral and stromatoporoid reef ecosystems wiped out. Loss of placoderms and many groups of jawless fish. Hangenberg extinction: loss of c. 16% of marine families and c. 21% of marine genera, including ammonoids, ostracods and sharks.	372.15 ± 0.46 ^{*}
Phanerozoic	Paleozoic	Devonian	Upper/Late	Frasnian		382.31 ± 1.36 ^{*}
Phanerozoic	Paleozoic	Devonian	Middle	Givetian		387.95 ± 1.04 ^{*}
Phanerozoic	Paleozoic	Devonian	Middle	Eifelian		393.47 ± 0.99 ^{*}
Phanerozoic	Paleozoic	Devonian	Lower/Early	Emsian		410.62 ± 1.95 ^{*}
Phanerozoic	Paleozoic	Devonian	Lower/Early	Pragian		413.02 ± 1.91 ^{*}
Phanerozoic	Paleozoic	Devonian	Lower/Early	Lochkovian		419.62 ± 1.36 ^{*}
Phanerozoic	Paleozoic	Silurian	Pridoli		Laurentia and Avalonia-Baltica collide as Iapetus Ocean closes, Caledonian-Scandian orogeny, and formation of Laurussia. Other orogenies: Salinic (Appalachians); Famatinian (South America) tapers off; Lachlan (Australia). Series of microcontinents and North China separate opening Paleo-Tethys and closing Paleoasian Ocean. Rheic Ocean widens between Gondwana and Laurussia. Siberia drifts north of equator. Temperatures increase as Hirnantian glaciation ends. Sea levels rise. Deposition of black shales, North Africa and Arabia, major hydrocarbon source rocks. Fluctuating climate with glacial advances results in changing ocean conditions causes extinction events, followed by ecological recoveries. Widespread evaporite deposition and hothouse climate by late Silurian. After end-Ordovician mass extinction, major radiation of graptolites, bivalves, gastropods, nautiloids, brachiopods, and crinoids. Increase in trilobites, but never fully recover. Corals and stromatoporiods diversify to produce large reefs. Proliferation of eurypterid arthropods. Earliest jawed fish (acanthodians). Appearance of ostracoderms. Appearance of vascular plants. First land animals including myriapods. First freshwater fish.	422.7 ± 1.6 ^{*}
Phanerozoic	Paleozoic	Silurian	Ludlow	Ludfordian		425 ± 1.5 ^{*}
Phanerozoic	Paleozoic	Silurian	Ludlow	Gorstian		426.7 ± 1.5 ^{*}
Phanerozoic	Paleozoic	Silurian	Wenlock	Homerian		430.6 ± 1.3 ^{*}
Phanerozoic	Paleozoic	Silurian	Wenlock	Sheinwoodian		432.9 ± 1.2 ^{*}
Phanerozoic	Paleozoic	Silurian	Llandovery	Telychian		438.6 ± 1.0 ^{*}
Phanerozoic	Paleozoic	Silurian	Llandovery	Aeronian		440.5 ± 1.0 ^{*}
Phanerozoic	Paleozoic	Silurian	Llandovery	Rhuddanian		443.1 ± 0.9 ^{*}
Phanerozoic	Paleozoic	Ordovician	Upper/Late	Hirnantian	Most continents lay in equatorial regions. Gondwana stretched to south pole. Panthalassic Ocean covered northern hemisphere. Avalonia rifted from Gondwana closing Iapetus Ocean in front, opening Rheic Ocean behind. South China close to Gondwana; North China between Siberia and Gondwana. Orogenies: Famatinian (South America); Benambran (Australia); Taconic (Laurentia). Baltica and Siberia drift north. Early greenhouse climate, cooling to icehouse conditions during Hirnantian Ice Age. Increase in atmospheric O_{2}. Great Ordovician Biodiversification Event, major increase in new genera e.g. brachiopods, trilobites, corals, echinoderms, bryozoans, gastropods, bivalves, nautiloids, graptolites, and conodonts. Very high sea levels expand shallow continental seas, increase range of ecological niches. Modern marine ecosystems established. Earliest jawless fish. Tabulate corals and stromatoporoids dominant reef builders. Nautiloids main predators. Appearance of eurypterids and asteroids. Spread of early land plants. Late Ordovician mass extinction, loss of ~85 % of marine invertebrate species. Two pulses: first with onset of glaciation affects tropical fauna; second at end of ice age, warming climate impacts cool water species. Drastic reduction in trilobite, brachiopod, graptolite, echinoderm, conodont, coral, and chitinozoan genera.	445.2 ± 0.9 ^{*}
Phanerozoic	Paleozoic	Ordovician	Upper/Late	Katian		452.8 ± 0.7 ^{*}
Phanerozoic	Paleozoic	Ordovician	Upper/Late	Sandbian		458.2 ± 0.7 ^{*}
Phanerozoic	Paleozoic	Ordovician	Middle	Darriwilian		469.4 ± 0.9 ^{*}
Phanerozoic	Paleozoic	Ordovician	Middle	Dapingian		471.3 ± 1.4 ^{*}
Phanerozoic	Paleozoic	Ordovician	Lower/Early	Floian (formerly Arenig)		477.1 ± 1.2 ^{*}
Phanerozoic	Paleozoic	Ordovician	Lower/Early	Tremadocian		486.85 ± 1.5 ^{*}
Phanerozoic	Paleozoic	Cambrian	Furongian	Stage 10	Gondwana stretched from the south pole to equator, separated from Laurentia and Baltica by the Iapetus Ocean. Siberia lay close to the equator, north of Baltica; North and South China close to equatorial Gondwana. Orogenies: Cadomian (N.Africa/southern Europe); Kuunga (central Gondwana); Famatinian orogeny (South America); Delamerian (Australia). Greenhouse climate. High atmospheric CO_{2} levels. Atmospheric oxygen levels rose with increase in photosynthesising organisms. Early aragonite seas replaced by mixed aragonite-calcite seas with many animals developing CaCO_{3} skeletons. Rapid diversification of animals (Cambrian Explosion), most modern animal phyla appear, e.g. arthropods; molluscs; annelids; echinoderms; bryozoa; priapulids; brachiopods; hemichordates; and, chordates. Radiations of small shelly fossils. Giant anomalocarids (arthropods) dominant predators. Increase in bioturbation and grazing led to decline in stromatolites. Varying oxygen levels in oceans led to series of extinction events followed by radiations, including: earliest Cambrian loss of the Ediacaran acritarchs; end-Botomian extinction, linked to the Kalkarindji large igneous province eruptions (c. 514 Ma) with loss of archaeocyathids (early Cambrian reef builders) and hyoliths; and, end-Cambrian reduction in trilobite diversity. Many fossil lagerstätten, including Burgess Shale and Chengjiang Formation, formed by rapid burial in anoxic conditions.	~491
Phanerozoic	Paleozoic	Cambrian	Furongian	Jiangshanian		~494.2 ^{*}
Phanerozoic	Paleozoic	Cambrian	Furongian	Paibian		~497 ^{*}
Phanerozoic	Paleozoic	Cambrian	Miaolingian	Guzhangian		~500.5 ^{*}
Phanerozoic	Paleozoic	Cambrian	Miaolingian	Drumian		~504.5 ^{*}
Phanerozoic	Paleozoic	Cambrian	Miaolingian	Wuliuan		~506.5
Phanerozoic	Paleozoic	Cambrian	Series 2	Stage 4		~514.5
Phanerozoic	Paleozoic	Cambrian	Series 2	Stage 3		~521
Phanerozoic	Paleozoic	Cambrian	Terreneuvian	Stage 2		~529
Phanerozoic	Paleozoic	Cambrian	Terreneuvian	Fortunian		538.8 ± 0.6 ^{*}
Proterozoic	Neoproterozoic	Ediacaran	As Rodinia breaks up Gondwana begins to assemble with the Pan-African (Africa and South America), East African (Africa, India and Arabia) and Kuungan (India, eastern Antarctica and western Australia) orogenies. Rapid rise in eukaryote diversity and numbers, including early animals. First biomineralising animals. First cnidarians (jellyfish and sea pens). 580 Ma Gaskiers glaciation, followed by rise in atmospheric oxygen levels. Ediacaran biota, deep water, soft-bodied organisms. First trace fossils including simple burrows and first evidence of bilateral symmetry.			~635 ^{*}
Proterozoic	Neoproterozoic	Cryogenian	Rodinia continues to breakup. 720 Ma eruptions of Franklin and Irkutsk LIPs mark rifting of Siberia from Laurentia. Iapetus Ocean begins to open as Amazonia and Baltica drift from Laurentia (from c. 650 Ma). Sturtian (720–658 Ma) and Marinoan (655–635 Ma) Snowball Earth glaciations.			~720
Proterozoic	Neoproterozoic	Tonian	900 Ma Rodinia at its maximum extent. Intracontinental rifting begins c. 850 Ma, associated magmatism becoming widespread from 825 Ma, including the Malani Igneous Suite eruptions, India (c. 775 Ma). Beginning of breakup of Rodinia from c. 750 Ma.			1000 (Note: Defined by absolute age (Global Standard Stratigraphic Age).)
Proterozoic	Mesoproterozoic	Stenian	Collision between Laurentia and Amazonia results in Grenville orogeny which, with Sveconorwegian orogeny in Baltica, mark beginning of assembly of Rodinian supercontinent. Diversification of eukaryotes as oxygen levels increase. All major modern day clades, including Archaeplastida (e.g. red and green algae), Opisthokonta (e.g. fungi) and Amoebozoa appear. Evidence for life on land. Bangiomorpha pubescens (red algae) earliest known sexually reproducing organism.			1200
Proterozoic	Mesoproterozoic	Ectasian	Extensive dyke swarms found across all cratons mark completion of breakup of Columbia (Nuna) supercontinent. Oceans have oxygen-rich surface layers and euxinic (no oxygen, high levels of H_{2}S) deep waters, leading to widespread formation of giant massive sulphide deposits (SEDEX) on the seafloor.			1400
Proterozoic	Mesoproterozoic	Calymmian	Columbia continues to fragment with widespread rift-related magmatism. Stromatolites reach their maximum extent and diversity as cyanobacteria diversify and flourish. Primitive seaweeds appear.			1600
Proterozoic	Paleoproterozoic	Statherian	Columbian supercontinent continues to grow along its margins by subduction-related magmatism and terrane accretion. Extension and rift zones begin to develop from c. 1.6 Ga. Eukaryotic red algae appear. Vredefort impact event (2.19 Ga).			1800
Proterozoic	Paleoproterozoic	Orosirian	2.0–1.8 Ga Columbia supercontinent assembles during collisional events including Trans-Hudson orogeny (North America), Limpopo Belt (South Africa), Capricorn orogeny (Australia) and Trans-North China orogeny. Drop in atmospheric oxygen as increased volcanism releases carbon dioxide. Grypania represents a possible early eukaryote. Sudbury Impact (1.85 Ga).			2050
Proterozoic	Paleoproterozoic	Rhyacian	Massive rise in atmospheric oxygen leads to expansion of life and increased burial of organic matter (Lomagundi carbon isotope excursion) (2.3 to 2.1 Ga). First red beds deposited. Eruptions of Bushveld Magmatic Province (from 2.25 Ga). Orogenies in South America and West Africa mark beginning of Columbia supercontinent. Yarrabubba impact structure (c. 2.23 Ga).			2300
Proterozoic	Paleoproterozoic	Siderian	2.5 – 2.42 Ga massive banded iron formations (BIFs) precipitated across most continents. Increasing atmospheric oxygen leads to Great Oxidation Event (c. 2.4––2.3 Ga) and Huronian glaciations as global temperatures drop.			2500
Archean	Neoarchean	Widespread mantle melting and crustal growth followed by formation of supercratons Superia (North America, northwest Europe, South Africa and northwest Australia) and Sclavia (Canada, Zimbabwe, southern India, southwestern Australia, Brazil and North China). Major diversification of cyanobacteria with multicellularity, increasing cell size and specialisation. Proliferation of oxygen-producing life leads to stepwise increase in atmospheric oxygen and deposition of banded iron formation.				2800
Archean	Mesoarchean	Possible onset of plate tectonics c. 3 Ga. Cratons with low relief and extensive shallow marine environments. Weathering increased supply of nutrients to seas. Localised free oxygen associated with carbonate platform stromatolites. Evidence for oxygen-producing photosynthesisers (and possible eukaryotes) c. 3.2 Ga, and terrestrial life c. 3 Ga. Oldest evidence of glaciation c. 2.9 Ga.				3200
Archean	Paleoarchean	Growth of cratons by terrane accretion. Oldest evidence for macroscopic life preserved as stromatolites (c. 3.4 Ga). Evidence for anaerobic prokaryotes in variety of environments including hydrothermal systems and within subsurface sediments. Microbial mats and biofilms become common in shallow water environments.				3600
Archean	Eoarchean	Increasing formation of continental crust. 3.8 – 3.65 Ga chemical traces of life in earliest known sedimentary rocks (Isua Greenstone Belt). Anaerobic prokaryotes including chemotrophs and photosynthesisers appear from c. 3.7 Ga. Early BIFs due to anoxygenic photosynthesis.				4031
Hadean	Earth consolidates from solar nebula over 10-30 million years. Collision with Theia (proto-planet) forms Moon from debris. Core differentiates. Magma ocean cools, releasing CO_{2} and water to give CO_{2}-rich atmosphere. Icy asteroids also contribute water. Mantle convection begins with rapid, shallow plate tectonics or stagnant lid tectonics. Decline in meteorite impacts with last ocean-vaporising impact c. 4.3 Ga. Probable emergence of life after this. Evidence for oldest crust from detrital zircon c. 4.37 Ga. Acasta gneiss complex contains oldest recorded rocks c. 4.03 Ga.					4567.3 ± 0.16

== Major proposed revisions to the ICC ==
=== Proposed Anthropocene Series/Epoch ===
First suggested in 2000, the Anthropocene is a proposed epoch/series for the most recent time in Earth's history. While still informal, it is a widely used term to denote the present geologic time interval, in which many conditions and processes on Earth are profoundly altered by human impact. The definition of the Anthropocene as a geologic time period rather than a geologic event remains controversial and difficult.

In May 2019 the Anthropocene Working Group voted in favour of submitting a formal proposal to the ICS for the establishment of the Anthropocene Series/Epoch. The formal proposal was completed and submitted to the Subcommission on Quaternary Stratigraphy in late 2023 for a section in Crawford Lake, Ontario, with heightened Plutonium levels corresponding to 1952 CE. This proposal was rejected as a formal geologic epoch in early 2024, to be left instead as an "invaluable descriptor of human impact on the Earth system"

=== Proposals for revisions to pre-Cryogenian timeline ===
==== Shields et al. 2021 ====
The ICS Subcommission for Cryogenian Stratigraphy has outlined a template to improve the pre-Cryogenian geologic time scale based on the rock record to bring it in line with the post-Tonian geologic time scale. This work assessed the geologic history of the currently defined eons and eras of the Precambrian, and the proposals in the "Geological Time Scale" books 2004, 2012, and 2020. Their recommend revisions of the pre-Cryogenian geologic time scale were as below (changes from the current scale [v2023/09] are italicised). This suggestion was unanimously rejected by the Subcommission on Precryogenian Stratigraphy, based on scientific weaknesses.

- Three divisions of the Archean instead of four by dropping Eoarchean, and revisions to their geochronometric definition, along with the repositioning of the Siderian into the latest Neoarchean, and a potential Kratian division in the Neoarchean.
  - Archean (4000–2450 Ma)
    - Paleoarchean (4000–3500 Ma)
    - Mesoarchean (3500–3000 Ma)
    - Neoarchean (3000–2450 Ma)
      - Kratian (no fixed time given, prior to the Siderian) – from Greek κράτος (krátos) 'strength'.
      - Siderian (?–2450 Ma) – moved from Proterozoic to end of Archean, no start time given, base of Paleoproterozoic defines the end of the Siderian
- Refinement of geochronometric divisions of the Proterozoic, Paleoproterozoic, repositioning of the Statherian into the Mesoproterozoic, new Skourian period/system in the Paleoproterozoic, new Kleisian or Syndian period/system in the Neoproterozoic.
  - Paleoproterozoic (2450–1800 Ma)
    - Skourian (2450–2300 Ma) – from Greek σκουριά (skouriá) 'rust'.
    - Rhyacian (2300–2050 Ma)
    - Orosirian (2050–1800 Ma)
  - Mesoproterozoic (1800–1000 Ma)
    - Statherian (1800–1600 Ma)
    - Calymmian (1600–1400 Ma)
    - Ectasian (1400–1200 Ma)
    - Stenian (1200–1000 Ma)
  - Neoproterozoic (1000–538.8 Ma) (Note: Geochronometric date for the Ediacaran has been adjusted to reflect ICC v2023/09 as the formal definition for the base of the Cambrian has not changed.)
    - Kleisian or Syndian (1000–800 Ma) – respectively from Greek κλείσιμο (kleísimo) 'closure' and σύνδεση (sýndesi) 'connection'.
    - Tonian (800–720 Ma)
    - Cryogenian (720–635 Ma)
    - Ediacaran (635–538.8 Ma)

Proposed pre-Cambrian timeline (Shield et al. 2021, ICS working group on pre-Cryogenian chronostratigraphy), shown to scale: (Note: Kratian time span is not given in the article. It lies within the Neoarchean, and prior to the Siderian. The position shown here is an arbitrary division.)

ICC pre-Cambrian timeline (v2026-06, current as of August 2026), shown to scale:

==== Van Kranendonk et al. 2012 (GTS2012) ====
The book, Geologic Time Scale 2012, was the last commercial publication of an international chronostratigraphic chart that was closely associated with the ICS and the Subcommission on Precambrian Stratigraphy. It included a proposal to substantially revise the pre-Cryogenian time scale to reflect important events such as the formation of the Solar System and the Great Oxidation Event, among others, while at the same time maintaining most of the previous chronostratigraphic nomenclature for the pertinent time span. As of April 2022 these proposed changes have not been accepted by the ICS. The proposed changes (changes from the current scale [v2023/09]) are italicised:

- Hadean Eon (4567–4030 Ma)
  - Chaotian Era/Erathem (4567–4404 Ma) – the name alluding both to the mythological Chaos and the chaotic phase of planet formation.
  - Jack Hillsian or Zirconian Era/Erathem (4404–4030 Ma) – both names allude to the Jack Hills Greenstone Belt which provided the oldest mineral grains on Earth, zircons.
- Archean Eon/Eonothem (4030–2420 Ma)
  - Paleoarchean Era/Erathem (4030–3490 Ma)
    - Acastan Period/System (4030–3810 Ma) – named after the Acasta Gneiss, one of the oldest preserved pieces of continental crust.
    - Isuan Period/System (3810–3490 Ma) – named after the Isua Greenstone Belt.
  - Mesoarchean Era/Erathem (3490–2780 Ma)
    - Vaalbaran Period/System (3490–3020 Ma) – based on the names of the Kaapvaal (Southern Africa) and Pilbara (Western Australia) cratons, to reflect the growth of stable continental nuclei or proto-cratonic kernels.
    - Pongolan Period/System (3020–2780 Ma) – named after the Pongola Supergroup, in reference to the well preserved evidence of terrestrial microbial communities in those rocks.
  - Neoarchean Era/Erathem (2780–2420 Ma)
    - Methanian Period/System (2780–2630 Ma) – named for the inferred predominance of methanotrophic prokaryotes
    - Siderian Period/System (2630–2420 Ma) – named for the voluminous banded iron formations formed within its duration.
- Proterozoic Eon/Eonothem (2420–538.8 Ma)
  - Paleoproterozoic Era/Erathem (2420–1780 Ma)
    - Oxygenian Period/System (2420–2250 Ma) – named for displaying the first evidence for a global oxidising atmosphere.
    - Jatulian or Eukaryian Period/System (2250–2060 Ma) – names are respectively for the Lomagundi–Jatuli δ^{13}C isotopic excursion event spanning its duration, and for the (proposed) first fossil appearance of eukaryotes.
    - Columbian Period/System (2060–1780 Ma) – named after the supercontinent Columbia.
  - Mesoproterozoic Era/Erathem (1780–850 Ma)
    - Rodinian Period/System (1780–850 Ma) – named after the supercontinent Rodinia, stable environment.

Proposed pre-Cambrian timeline (GTS2012), shown to scale:

ICC pre-Cambrian timeline (v2024/12, current as of January 2025), shown to scale:

== Extraterrestrial geologic time scales ==
Some other planets and satellites in the Solar System have sufficiently rigid structures to have preserved records of their own histories, for example, Venus, Mars and the Earth's Moon. Dominantly fluid planets, such as the giant planets, do not comparably preserve their history. Apart from the Late Heavy Bombardment, events on other planets probably had little direct influence on the Earth, and events on Earth had correspondingly little effect on those planets. Construction of a time scale that links the planets is, therefore, of only limited relevance to the Earth's time scale, except in a Solar System context. The existence, timing, and terrestrial effects of the Late Heavy Bombardment are still a matter of debate.

=== Lunar (selenological) time scale ===
The geologic history of Earth's Moon has been divided into a time scale based on geomorphological markers, namely impact cratering, volcanism, and erosion. This process of dividing the Moon's history in this manner means that the time scale boundaries do not imply fundamental changes in geological processes, unlike Earth's geologic time scale. Five geologic systems/periods (Pre-Nectarian, Nectarian, Imbrian, Eratosthenian, Copernican), with the Imbrian divided into two series/epochs (Early and Late) were defined in the latest Lunar geologic time scale. The Moon is unique in the Solar System in that it is the only other body from which humans have rock samples with a known geological context.

Millions of years before present

=== Martian geologic time scale ===
The geological history of Mars has been divided into two alternate time scales. The first time scale for Mars was developed by studying the impact crater densities on the Martian surface. Through this method four periods have been defined, the Pre-Noachian (~4,500–4,100 Ma), Noachian (~4,100–3,700 Ma), Hesperian (~3,700–3,000 Ma), and Amazonian (~3,000 Ma to present).

Martian time periods (millions of years ago)

A second time scale based on mineral alteration observed by the OMEGA spectrometer on board the Mars Express. Using this method, three periods were defined, the Phyllocian (~4,500–4,000 Ma), Theiikian (~4,000–3,500 Ma), and Siderikian (~3,500 Ma to present).

=== Mercurian time scale ===
Planetary geologists Paul Spudis and John Guest divide Mercury's geologic units into five time periods in a manner similar to those of the Moon. The five periods are: the pre-Tolstojan (before ~4,000 Ma), Tolstojan (~4,000–3,900 Ma), Calorian (~3,900–1700±200 Ma), Mansurian (1700±200–280±60 Ma), and Kuiperian (280±60 Ma to present).

Mercurian time periods (millions of years ago)

=== Plutonian time scale ===
The geologic history of Pluto has been tentatively divided into four periods for the regions closely observed by New Horizons, each named after an associated significant feature: the Burneyan, representing the oldest, most cratered terrain; the Hayabusan, representing middle-aged, eroded terrain; the Tartaran, representing relatively young terrain associated with the sublimation and deposition of volatiles; and Sputnikian, representing the very young ice deposits of Sputnik Planitia.

Plutonian time periods (millions of years ago)

== See also ==
- Cosmic calendar
- Deep time
- Evolutionary history of life
- Formation and evolution of the Solar System
- Geology of Mars
- Geon (geology)
- History of Earth
- History of geology
- History of paleontology
- List of geochronologic names
- Natural history
- New Zealand geologic time scale
- Prehistoric life
- Timeline of the Big Bang
- Timeline of evolution
- Timeline of the geologic history of the United States
- Timeline of human evolution
- Timeline of natural history
- Timeline of paleontology
