= Scandian orogeny =

Mountain building event in northern Europe

The Scandian orogeny was an orogeny mountain building event, preserved in the rocks of eastern Greenland, eastern Svalbard, northern Scotland and much of the coast of Norway.

The orogeny occurred from 435 to 410 million years ago, as Baltica and Laurentia collided. The remnants of an ophiolite complex which was obducted eastward onto Baltica are located on southwest coast of Norway. The present of eclogite containing the mineral coesite indicates high pressure and high-temperature burial of Baltican rocks, as much as 80 to 100 kilometers deep.
