= Geon (geology) =

The term geon (for geological eon) refers to large, geologic units of time. Geologists traditionally subdivide Earth history into a hierarchy of named intervals: eons, eras, periods, etc. (e.g., the Jurassic Period of the Mesozoic Era). Historians subdivide the history of human activity into intervals that are comparatively much shorter. In both geological and historical scales, the divisions of equal rank are characteristically of unequal duration, and the identification of a particular interval is primarily based on its fossil, artifact, or cultural content (e.g., Carboniferous, Neolithic, Dark Ages, Ming Dynasty). Both scales are calibrated against numerical ages obtained separately.

An alternative way of referring to the past is to use a scale with intervals of equal duration. We speak of a given decade, century, or millennium. For the enormously long geologic time frame, it is advantageous to use corresponding large, equal time intervals encompassing the events and processes that have shaped our planet. The development of mountain ranges, ocean basins, and continents takes tens to hundreds of millions of years, and large time units thus are convenient for discussing long-term trends. Astronomers use light years and parsecs to deal with huge distances, rather than kilometres. Geologists have geons to refer to large specified time intervals of Earth history. The geon scale is also applicable to other planets with different histories, and to the universe itself.

Two usages of geon have been introduced in geology:

1. A geon is a unit "...taken to represent either the span of the average geologic period, or the thickness of the average stratigraphic equivalent, a matter of 60,000,000 years, and 50,000 feet [~15 km] of clastic depositions" (Woodward, 1929). Utilizing the currently accepted value of 542 Ma (million years ago) for the beginning of the Cambrian Period, and using 11 geologic periods in the Phanerozoic Eon, an updated value for Woodward's geon would be about 49.4 million years. Usage in this sense is not current.
2. A geon is a specified 100-million-year interval of geologic time, counted backward from the present. The geon scale can be likened to a ladder, each interval between rungs representing 100 million years. Geons are named for the leftmost part of the number representing age. For example, the Earth formed about 4550 million years ago, an event that is assigned to Geon 45 (interval below rung 45). Rocks formed at 1851 Ma or 1800 Ma both belong to Geon 18. The extinction of the dinosaurs at the end of the Cretaceous Period (065 Ma) belongs to Geon 0. (Hofmann, 1990).
