= Series (stratigraphy) =

Scheme relating geologic strata to age

Series are subdivisions of rock layers based on the age of the rock and formally defined by international conventions of the geological timescale. A series is therefore a sequence of strata defining a chronostratigraphic unit. Series are subdivisions of systems and are themselves divided into stages.

Series is a term defining a unit of rock layers formed during a certain interval of time (a chronostratigraphic unit); it is equivalent (but not synonymous) to the term geological epoch which defines the interval of time itself, although the two words are sometimes confused in informal literature.

== Geological timescale ==
Units in geochronology and stratigraphy
Segments of rock (strata) in chronostratigraphy	Time spans in geochronology	Notes to geochronological units
Eonothem	Eon	4 total, half a billion years or more
Erathem	Era	10 defined, several hundred million years
System	Period	22 defined, tens to ~one hundred million years
Series	Epoch	38 defined, tens of millions of years
Stage	Age	101 defined, millions of years
Chronozone	Chron	subdivision of an age, not used by the ICS timescale

The geological timescale has all systems in the Phanerozoic eonothem subdivided into series. Some of these have their own names; in other cases a system is simply divided into a lower, middle and upper series, with official series being capitalized and unofficial designations (such as "middle Cretaceous") being left uncapitalized. The Cretaceous system is, for example, divided into the Upper Cretaceous and Lower Cretaceous series, while the Carboniferous system is divided into the Pennsylvanian and Mississippian series. As of 2008, the International Commission on Stratigraphy (ICS) had not yet named all four series of the Cambrian. Currently series are limited to the Phanerozoic, but the ICS has stated its intention of subdividing the three systems of the Neoproterozoic (Ediacaran, Cryogenian and Tonian) into stages too.

== Systems and lithostratigraphy ==
Systems can include many lithostratigraphic units (for example formations, beds, members, etc.) of differing rock types that were being laid down in different environments at the same time. In the same way, a lithostratigraphic unit can include a number of systems or parts of them.
