= Chronozone =

Unit in chronostratigraphy

A chronozone or chron is a unit in chronostratigraphy, defined by events such as geomagnetic reversals (magnetozones), or based on the presence of specific fossils (biozone or biochronozone). According to the International Commission on Stratigraphy, the term "chronozone" refers to the rocks formed during a particular time period, while "chron" refers to that time period.

Although non-hierarchical, chronozones have been recognized as useful markers or benchmarks of time in the rock record. Chronozones are non-hierarchical in that chronozones do not need to correspond across geographic or geologic boundaries, nor be equal in length. Although a former, early constraint required that a chronozone be defined as smaller than a geological stage. Another early use was hierarchical in that Harland et al. (1989) used "chronozone" for the slice of time smaller than a faunal stage defined in biostratigraphy. The ICS superseded these earlier usages in 1994.

The key factor in designating an internationally acceptable chronozone is whether the overall fossil column is clear, unambiguous, and widespread. Some accepted chronozones contain others, and certain larger chronozones have been designated which span whole defined geological time units, both large and small. For example, the chronozone Pliocene is a subset of the chronozone Neogene, and the chronozone Pleistocene is a subset of the chronozone Quaternary.

Units in geochronology and stratigraphy
Segments of rock (strata) in chronostratigraphy	Time spans in geochronology	Notes to geochronological units
Eonothem	Eon	4 total, half a billion years or more
Erathem	Era	10 defined, several hundred million years
System	Period	22 defined, tens to ~one hundred million years
Series	Epoch	34 defined, tens of millions of years
Stage	Age	99 defined, millions of years
Chronozone	Chron	subdivision of an age, not used by the ICS timescale

== See also ==
- Body form
- Chronology (geology)
- European Mammal Neogene
- Geologic time scale
- North American Land Mammal Age
- Type locality (geology)
- List of GSSPs
