= Erathem =

Total strata deposited during a geologic era

In stratigraphy, paleontology, geology, and geobiology, an erathem is the total stratigraphic unit deposited during a certain corresponding span of time during an era in the geologic timescale.

It can therefore be used as a chronostratigraphic unit of time which delineates a large span of years – less than a geological eon, but greater than its successively smaller and more refined subdivisions (geologic periods, epochs, and geologic ages). By 3,500 million years ago (Mya) simple life had developed on earth (the oldest known microbial fossils in Australia are dated to this figure). The atmosphere was a mix of noxious and poisonous gases (methane, ammonia, sulfur compounds, etc. – a so-called reducing atmosphere lacking much free oxygen which was bound up in compounds).

These simple organisms, cyanobacteria ruled the still cooling earth for approximately a billion years and gradually transformed the atmosphere to one containing free oxygen. These changes, along with tectonic activity left chemical trails (red bed formation, etc.) and other physical clues (magnetic orientation, layer formation factors) in the rock record, and it is these changes along with the later richer fossil record which specialists use to demarcate times early in planet earth's history in various disciplines.

Erathems are not often used in practice. While they are subdivisions of eonothems and are themselves subdivided into systems, dating experts prefer the finer resolution of smaller spans of time when evaluating strata.

Erathems have the same names as their corresponding eras. The Phanerozoic eonothem can thus be divided into Cenozoic, Mesozoic, and Paleozoic erathems. Similarly, the Proterozoic eonothem is divided youngest to oldest into the Neoproterozoic, Mesoproterozoic and Paleoproterozoic erathems, and the Archean eon and eonothem are divided similarly into the Neoarchean, Mesoarchean, Paleoarchean and the Eoarchean, for which a lower (oldest) limit is undefined.

== See also ==
=== Multidiscipline comparison ===
Units in geochronology and stratigraphy
Segments of rock (strata) in chronostratigraphy	Time spans in geochronology	Notes to geochronological units
Eonothem	Eon	4 total, half a billion years or more
Erathem	Era	10 defined, several hundred million years
System	Period	22 defined, tens to ~one hundred million years
Series	Epoch	38 defined, tens of millions of years
Stage	Age	101 defined, millions of years
Chronozone	Chron	subdivision of an age, not used by the ICS timescale

=== Related other topics ===
- Body form
- European Mammal Neogene
- Geologic time scale
  - New Zealand geologic time scale
- North American Land Mammal Age
- Fauna (animals)
- Type locality
- List of GSSPs
