= Chronostratigraphy =

Branch of stratigraphy that studies the ages of rock strata in relation to time

Chronostratigraphy is the branch of stratigraphy that studies the ages of rock strata in relation to time.

The ultimate aim of chronostratigraphy is to arrange the sequence of deposition and the time of deposition of all rocks within a geological region, and eventually, the entire geologic record of the Earth.

The standard stratigraphic nomenclature is a chronostratigraphic system based on palaeontological intervals of time defined by recognised fossil assemblages (biostratigraphy). The aim of chronostratigraphy is to give a meaningful age date to these fossil assemblage intervals and interfaces.

== Methodology ==
Chronostratigraphy relies heavily upon isotope geology and geochronology to derive hard dating of known and well defined rock units which contain the specific fossil assemblages defined by the stratigraphic system. In practice, as it is very difficult to isotopically date most fossils and sedimentary rocks directly, inferences must be made in order to arrive at an age date which reflects the beginning of the interval.

The methodology used is derived from the law of superposition and the principles of cross-cutting relationships.

Because igneous rocks occur at specific intervals in time and are essentially instantaneous on a geologic time scale, and because they contain mineral assemblages which may be dated more accurately and precisely by isotopic methods, the construction of a chronostratigraphic column relies heavily upon intrusive and extrusive igneous rocks.

Metamorphism, often associated with faulting, may also be used to bracket depositional intervals in a chronostratigraphic column. Metamorphic rocks can occasionally be dated, and this may give some limitations to the age in which a bed could have been laid down. For example, if a bed containing graptolites overlies crystalline basement at some point, dating the crystalline basement will give a maximum age of that fossil assemblage.

This process requires a considerable degree of effort and checking of field relationships and age dates. For instance, there may be many millions of years between a bed being laid down and an intrusive rock cutting it; the estimate of age must necessarily be between the oldest cross-cutting intrusive rock in the fossil assemblage and the youngest rock upon which the fossil assemblage rests.

== Units ==
Chronostratigraphic units, with examples:

- Eonothem – Phanerozoic
- Erathem – Paleozoic
- System – Ordovician
- Series – Upper Ordovician
- Stage – Ashgill

== Differences from geochronology ==
It is important not to confuse geochronologic and chronostratigraphic units. Chronostratigraphic units are geological material, so it is correct to say that fossils of the species Tyrannosaurus rex have been found in the Upper Cretaceous Series. Geochronological units are periods of time and take the same name as standard stratigraphic units but replacing the terms upper/lower with late/early. Thus it is also correct to say that Tyrannosaurus rex lived during the Late Cretaceous Epoch.

Chronostratigraphy is an important branch of stratigraphy because the age correlations derived are crucial in drawing accurate cross sections of the spatial organization of rocks and in preparing accurate paleogeographic reconstructions.

== See also ==
- Biostratigraphy
- Chronozone
- Geochronology
- Geologic record
- Geologic time scale
- List of geochronologic names
- Tectonostratigraphy
