= List of geochronologic names =

This is a list of official and unofficial names for time spans in the geologic timescale and units of chronostratigraphy. Since many of the smallest subdivisions of the geologic timescale were in the past defined on regional lithostratigraphic units, there are many alternative names that overlap. The body concerned with standardizing the names of geochronologic units is the International Commission on Stratigraphy (ICS). In 2008 however, even though the Phanerozoic eon is almost completely divided into internationally recognizable units, local subdivisions are often still preferred over the international ones.

An official list of start dates as recognized by the ICS is also available.

== List ==
Time periods on the lunar geologic timescale
Time periods on the Martian geologic timescale

Name (English)	base/start (Ma)	top/end (Ma)	status	subdivision of	usage	named after	author, year
Aalenian	175.6 ± 2.0	171.6 ± 3.0	age	Jurassic	ICS	Aalen (Germany)	Mayer-Eymar, 1864
Abereiddian	471.8 ± 1.6	464	age	Ordovician	regional	Abereiddy (Wales)	Fortey et al., 1995
Actonian	454	453	age	Ordovician	regional	Acton Scott (England)	Bancroft, 1929
Adelaidean	1,300	542	age	Proterozoic	Australia	Adelaide	
Aegean	245 ± 1.5	244	age	Triassic	Europe	Aegean Sea	Tozer, 1967
Aeronian	439.0 ± 1.8	436.0 ± 1.9	age	Silurian	ICS	Cwm-coed-aeron (Wales)	Cocks et al., 1971
Aftonian	0.6	0.48	age	Pleistocene	North America		Chamberlin, 1895
Agenian	23	20.4	ELMMZ	Miocene	Europe	Agen (France)	Alberdi & Aguirre, 1977
Aimchanian		1,100	age	Proterozoic	Siberia		
Aksayan	493	491.5	age	Cambrian	Russia, Kazakhstan		Ergaliev, 1980
Alaunian	216	211	sub-age	Triassic	Europe		
Albertan			epoch	Cambrian	North America		Dawson, 1895
Albian	112.0 ± 1.0	99.6 ± 0.9	age	Cretaceous	ICS	Albia, Latin name of the river Aube (France)	d'Orbigny, 1842
Alding(i)an	36	30	age	Eocene	Australia		
Algonkian		543	age	Proterozoic	international	Algonquian native peoples of Canada	Powell, 1890
Allerød	13,350 BP	12,700 BP	chronozone	Weichselian	Northern Europe	Allerød (Denmark)	Haltz & Milthers, 1901
Alportian	324.5	318.1 ± 1.3	age	Carboniferous	regional	Alport (England)	Ramsbotton, 1979
Altonian	19.0	15.9	age	Miocene	New Zealand	Alton Burn, Southland Region	Frye & Wilmann, 1960
Amazonian	~1,800	present	Martian epoch	Martian epoch	Mars	Amazonis Planitia	Greeley & Spudis, 1981
Amgan	513.0 ± 2.0	502	age	Cambrian	Russia, Kazakhstan		Guarari, 1955
Amstelian	2.588	2.40	super-age	Pleistocene	Netherlands	river Amstel	Harmer, 1896
Anglian	0.465	0.418	age	Pleistocene	Great Britain	East Anglia	
Animikean	2,225	1,400	age	Proterozoic	North America (obsolete)		Hunt, 1873
Anisian	245.0 ± 1.5	237.0 ± 2.0	age	Triassic	ICS	Anisus, Latin name for the river Enns (Austria)	Mojsisovics, 1869
Antian	~2.12	~2.0	age	Pleistocene	Great Britain	River Ant (England)	West, 1962
Antwerpian	±21	±12	age	Miocene	Belgium (obsolete)	Antwerp	Gogels, 1879
Aphebian	2,500	1,600	age	Proterozoic	North America		Stockwell, 1964
Aptian	125.0 ± 1.0	112.0 ± 1.0	age	Cretaceous	ICS	Apt (France)	d'Orbigny, 1840
Aquatraversian	2.588	2.4	age	Pleistocene	Italy		
Aquilan	85.2	82.2	NALMA	Cretaceous	North America		Russell, 1975
Aquitanian	23.03	20.43	age	Miocene	ICS	Aquitaine	Mayer-Eymar, 1857
Archean	4,000	2,500	eon		ICS		Dana, 1876
Arenig(-ian)			epoch	Ordovician	Europe	Arenig Fawr (Wales)	Sedgwick, 1847; Fearnsides 1905
Arikareean	30.8	20.6	super-age	Oligo-Miocene	North America		Wood "et al.", 1941
Arnold	43.0	34.3	epoch	Paleogene	New Zealand	Arnold River	Kingma, 1962
Arnsbergian	326	325	sub-age	Carboniferous	regional		Hudson & Cotton, 1943
Arowhanan	95.2	92.1	age	Cretaceous	New Zealand	Arowhana	Wellman, 1959
Arshantan	52.1	46.2	ALMA	Eocene	Asia		Romer, 1966
Artinskian	284.4 ± 0.7	275.6 ± 0.7	age	Permian	ICS	Arti (Russia)	Karpinsky, 1874
Arundian	341	339	age	Carboniferous	regional	from Hobbyhorse Bay, Castlemartin, Pembrokeshire, Wales (arundo is Latin for hobbyhorse)	Ramsbotton, 1974
Asbian	337.5	333	age	Carboniferous	regional	Little Asby Scar, Cumbria, England	Ramsbotton, 1979
Ashbyan			age	Ordovician	North America		
Ashgill(-ian)			epoch	Ordovician	Europe	Ash Gill near Coniston, Cumbria	Marr, 1905
Asselian	299.0 ± 0.8	294.6 ± 0.8	age	Permian	ICS	river Assel (Kazakhstan)	Ruzhenchev, 1954
Astaracian	15	11.1	ELMMZ	Miocene	Europe	The Astarac (France)	Alberdi & Aguirre, 1977
Asturian		305	age	Carboniferous	Europe	Asturias	Stille, 1920
Atdabanian	530	524	age	Cambrian	Russia, Kazakhstan		Pelman, 1977
Atlantic	5,660 BP	9,220 BP	chronozone	Holocene	Northern Europe	the Atlantic Ocean	Blytt, 1876
Atokan			age	Carboniferous	North America		Spivey & Roberts, 1946
Aurelucian	460.9	457	age	Ordovician	Europe		
Austinian			age	Cretaceous	south and east of the US	Austin, Texas	Murray, 1961
Autunian	~300	~275	age	Carboniferous-Permian	Europe	Autun (France)	Munier-Chalmas & Lapparent, 1893
Avernian	29.2	23.03	ELMMZ	Oligocene	Europe		
Awamoan	20.0	17.5	age	Miocene	New Zealand		Thompson, 1916
Ayusokkanian	501.0 ± 2.0	494.5	age	Cambrian	Russia, Kazakhstan		Geyer & Shergold, 2000
Azoic see Archean							
Badenian	16.3	12.8	age	Miocene	Paratethys	Baden (Austria)	Papp & Cicha, 1968
Baikalian	850	650	age	Proterozoic	Siberia	Lake Baikal	Pavloski, 1948
Bairnsdalian	15.0	10.5	age	Miocene	Australia		
Baishaean	433	429	age	Silurian	China		Lu et al., 1974
Bajocian	171.6 ± 3.0	167.7 ± 3.5	age	Jurassic	ICS	Bayeux (France)	d'Orbigny, 1844
Balcombian	15.5	15.0	age	Miocene	Australia		Hall & Pritchard, 1902
Baotan	460.9	454.5	age	Ordovician	China		
Barremian	130.0 ± 1.5	125.0 ± 1.0	age	Cretaceous	ICS	Barrême (France)	Coquand, 1873
Barruelian			age	Carboniferous	Europe		George & Wagner, 1972
Barstovian	16.3	13.6	age	Miocene	North America		Wood "et al.", 1941
Bartonian	37.2 ± 0.1	40.4 ± 0.2	age	Eocene	ICS	Barton-on-Sea (South England)	Mayer-Eymar, 1857
Bashkirian	318.1 ± 1.3	311.7 ± 1.1	age	Carboniferous	ICS	Bashkortostan	Semikhatova, 1934
Basin Groups 1-9	4,150	3,850	subperiod	Prenectarium	Moon (unofficial)	groups of impact basins	
Batesfordian	16.5	15.5	age	Miocene	Australia		Chapman & Singleton, 1923
Bathonian	167.7 ± 3.5	164.7 ± 4.0	age	Jurassic	ICS	Bath (England)	D´Orbigny, 1852
Batyrbayan	491.5	488.3	age	Cambrian	Russia, Kazakhstan		Apollonov & Chugaeva, 1983
Bavel Interglacial	1.03	0.96	age	Pleistocene	Netherlands	Bavel	Zagwijn & De Jong, 1964
Bavelian	1.03	0.85	super-age	Pleistocene	Netherlands	Bavel	Zawijn & De Jong, 1964
Baventian	~2.0	~1.87	age	Pleistocene	Great Britain	Easton Bavents (England)	West, 1961
Bedoulian	129.97	125.0	sub-age	Cretaceous	regional		Toucas, 1873
Beestonian	1.77	~0.8	age	Pleistocene	Great Britain	Beeston, Norfolk (England)	West & Wilson, 1966
Belvédère Interglacial	0.338	0.324	age	Pleistocene	Netherlands	quarry "Belvédère" (Maastricht)	
Bendigonian	473.5	471.8	age	Ordovician	Australia	Bendigo, Victoria	Benson & Keble, 1935
Berriasian	145.5 ± 4.0	140.2 ± 3.0	age	Cretaceous	ICS	Berrias (France)	Coquand, 1871
Biber Glacial	~2.5	2.35	age	Pleistocene	Alps	river Biber (Germany)	Schaefer, 1953
Biber-Donau			age	Pleistocene	Alps		
Blancan	4.9	1.8	age	Plio-Pleistocene	North America		Wood "et al", 1941
Black River(-an)			age	Ordovician)	North America		Vanuxem, 1842
Bolderian	<21	>16	age	Miocene	Belgium (obsolete)	Bolderberg	Dumont, 1850
Bolindian	450	443.7	age	Ordovician	Australia		Webby, 1976
Bølling	13,730 BP	13,480 BP	chronozone	Weichselian	Northern Europe	Bølling Sø (Denmark)	Iversen, 1942
Bolsovian			age	Carboniferous	Europe	Bolsover (England)	Jongsmans, 1928
Boomerangian	504	501	age	Cambrian	Australia		Öpik, 1979
Boreal	10,640 BP	9,220 BP	chronozone	Holocene	Northern Europe	boreal zone in ecology	Blytt, 1876
Bortonian	43.0	37.0	age	Eocene	New Zealand	Bortons	Hornibrook, 1961
Botomian	524	518.5	age	Cambrian	Russia, Kazakhstan		Repina, 1964
Bramertonian	~2.12	~2.0	age	Pleistocene	Great Britain	Bramerton Pits (England)	Funnell, Norton, West and Mayhew, 1979
Bridgerian	50.3	46.2	age	Eocene	North America		Wood et al., 1941
Brigantian	336	326.4 ± 1.6	age	Carboniferous	North America, Europe	Brigantes (Celtic tribe)	Ramsbotton, 1979
Brioverian	~680	~600	age	Neoproterozoic	Armorican Massif, France		Barrois, 1899
Brüggenian	2.588	2.4	chronozone	Pleistocene	Northwest Europe		
Brunssumian	5.3	3.6	chronozone	Pliocene	Northwest Europe	Brunssum (The Netherlands)	Zagwijn, 1960
Bulitian	55.8	53	age	Eocene	California		Mallory, 1959
Bumbanian	55.7	52.1	ALMA	Eocene	Asia		Russell & Zhai, 1987
Buntsandstein	251.0 ± 0.4	246.6	epoch/subperiod	Triassic	Europe	German: bunte Sandstein = coloured sandstone	Von Alberti, 1834
Burdigalian	20.43	15.97	age	Miocene	ICS	Latin: Burdigala = Bordeaux (France)	Depéret, 1892
Burrellian	457	455	age	Ordovician	Europe	Glenburrell (England)	Fortey "et al.", 1995
Burzyan	1,400	1,375	age	Proterozoic	Russia		Kefler, 1952
Caerfai	542 ± 0.2	513 ± 2	age	Cambrian	Europe (obsolete)	Caerfai Bay (Wales)	Cowie "et al.", 1972
Calabrian	1.806	0.781	age	Pleistocene	Southern Europe	Calabria	Gignoux, 1913
Callovian	164.7 ± 4.0	161.2 ± 4.0	age	Jurassic	ICS	Kellaways (England)	d'Orbigny, 1849
Calymmian	1,600	1,400	period	Proterozoic	ICS		Plumb, 1991
Cambrian	542.0 ± 1.0	488.3 ± 1.7	period	Paleozoic	ICS	Cambria (Latin for Wales)	Sedgwick, 1835
Campanian	83.5 ± 0.7	70.6 ± 0.6	age	Cretaceous	ICS	Champagne (France)	Coquand, 1857
Canadian			epoch	Ordovician	North America		
Cantabrian	305		age	Carboniferous	Europe		Wagner, 1965
Capitanian	265.8 ± 0.7	260.4 ± 0.7	age	Permian	ICS	Capitan Reef (Texas, US)	Richardson, 1904
Caradocian	460.9	449.5	epoch	Ordovician	Europe	Caradoc (Welsh king)	Murchison, 1839
Carboniferous	359.2 ± 2.5	299.0 ± 0.8	period	Paleozoic	ICS	carbon	Conybeare & Phillips, 1822
Carixian	189.6 ± 1.5		sub-age	Jurassic	regional		Lang, 1913
Carnian	228.0 ± 2.0	216.5 ± 2.0	age	Triassic	ICS	Carnic Alps (Austria)	Mojsisovics, 1869
Carpentarian	1,800	1,300	age	Proterozoic	Australia	Gulf of Carpentaria	Dunn et al., 1966
Casamajoran	54	48	age	Eocene	South America		Pascual, 1965
Cassian	1.1	0.8	age	Pleistocene	Italy		Mayer-Eymar, 1888
Cassinian	473	471.8	sub-age	Ordovician	North America		Flower, 1957
Castlecliffian	1.63	0.34	age	Pleistocene	New Zealand	Castlecliff	Thompson, 1916
Castlemanian	471	470	age	Ordovician	Australia	Castlemaine	Strachan, 1972
Cautleyan	447.5	446.5	age	Ordovician	Europe	Cautley Spout (England)	Marr, 1914
Cayugan	421.3 ± 2.6	416.0 ± 2.8	age	Silurian	North America		Clark & Schuchert, 1898
Cenomanian	99.6 ± 0.9	93.5 ± 0.8	age	Cretaceous	ICS	Latin: Cenomanium = Le Mans (France)	d'Orbigny, 1847
Cenozoic	65.5 ± 0.3	present	era	Phanerozoic	ICS	new life	Phillips, 1847
Cernaysian	55.9	55.0	ELMMZ	Paleocene	Europe		Lemoine, 1880
Chadian	345.3 ± 2.1	341	age	Carboniferous	regional	St Chad, Chatburn, Lancashire	Ramsbotton, 1979
Chadronian	38.0	33.9	age	Eocene	North America		Wood "et al.", 1941
Chamovnicheskian	306	305	age	Carboniferous	Russia		
Champlanian			epoch	Ordovician	North America		Emmons, 1842
Changhsingian	253.8 ±0.7	251.0 ± 0.4	age	Permian	ICS	Changxing (China)	Sheng, 1963
Changlangpuan	523	518	age	Cambrian	China		
Changshanian	496.8	492.5	age	Cambrian	China		Walcott, 1913
Chapadmalalan	4.0	3.0	age	Pliocene	South America		Kraglievich, 1930
Chasicoan	10.0	9.0	age	Miocene	South America		Cabrera & Kraglievich, 1928
Chatauquan	370	359.2 ± 2.5	age	Devonian	South America		Clark & Schuchert 1898
Chattian	28.4 ± 0.1	23.03	age	Oligocene	ICS	Chatti (ancient Germanic tribe)	Fuchs, 1894
Chautauquan			age	Devonian	North America		
Chazyan			age	Ordovician	North America		Kay, 1958
Cheltenhamian	5.0	4.3	age	Pliocene	Australia		Mayer-eymar, 1881
Cheneyan	455	452	age	Ordovician	Europe		
Cheremshankian	314.5	313.4	age	Carboniferous	Russia		Aisenverg, 1979
Chesterian	333	318.1	age	Carboniferous	North America		Worthen, 1860
Chewtonian	473	471	age	Ordovician	Australia		Harris & Thomas, 1938
Chokierian	325	324.5	sub-age	Carboniferous	regional	Chokier, Belgium	Hodson (1957)
Cincinnatian	451	443.7 ± 1.5	epoch	Ordovician	North America	Cincinnati	Meek & Worthen, 1865
Cisuralian	299.0 ± 0.8	270.6 ± 0.7	epoch	Permian	ICS		Waterhouse, 1982
Clansayesian	115.0	112.0	sub-age	Cretaceous			Breistroffer, 1947
Clarendonian	13.6	10.3	age	Miocene	North America		Wood "et al.", 1941
Clarkforkian	56.8	55.4	age	Paleo-Eocene	North America		Granger, 1914
Clifdenian	15.9	15.1	age	Miocene	New Zealand	Clifden	Fleming, 1959
Colhuehuapian	21.0	17.5	age	Miocene	South America		Flynn " et al.", 1995
Colloncuran	15.5	13.8	age	Miocene	South America		Groeber, 1929
Coniacian	89.3 ± 1.0	85.8 ± 0.7	age	Cretaceous	ICS	Cognac (France)	Coquand, 1857
Copernican	1,100	present	period		Moon	Copernicus	
Costonian	460.9	459	age	Ordovician	regional		Bancroft, 1933
Couvinian	397.5 ± 2.7	391.8 ± 2.7	age	Devonian	Belgium (obsolete)	Couvin	d'Omalius d'Halloy, 1862
Cressagian	488.3 ± 1.7	486	age	Ordovician	Europe		
Cretaceous	145.5 ± 4.0	65.5 ± 0.3	period	Mesozoic	ICS	Crete; Latin creta=chalk	d'Omalius d'Halloy, 1822
Croixan			epoch	Cambrian	North America		
Cromerian	0.85	0.465	super-age/age	Pleistocene	Netherlands, Great Britain	Cromer (England)	Reid, 1882
Cryogenian	850	635.5 ± 1.2	period	Proterozoic	ICS	frozen beginning	Plumb, 1991
Cryptic	4,567	4,150	epoch	Prenectarian	Moon (unofficial)	hidden	
Dacian	5.332 ± 0.005	3.600 ± 0.005	age	Pliocene	Paratethys	Dacia (Roman province)	Teisseyre, 1907
Dalanian (Dalaun)	313	310	age	Carboniferous	China		
Danian	65.5 ± 0.3	61.7 ± 0.2	age	Paleocene	ICS	Denmark	Desor, 1847
Dannevirke	65.0	43.0	epoch	Paleogene	New Zealand	Dannevirke	Kingma, 1962
Dapingian	471.8 ± 1.6	468.1 ± 1.6	age	Ordovician	ICS	Daping (China)	Huang & Zhu, 1948
Darriwilian	468.1 ± 1.6	460.9 ± 1.6	age	Ordovician	ICS	Darriwil (Australia)	Hall, 1899
Datangian	345	333	age	Carboniferous	China		Ding, 1931
Datsonian	488.3 ± 1.7	485	age	Ordovician	Australia		Jones et al., 1971
Dawanian	472	471.8	age	Ordovician	North America		Xiang "et al.", 1980
Deerparkian			age	Devonian	North America		Cooper et al., 1942
Delamaran	512	504	age	Cambrian	North America	Palmer, 1998	
Delmontian	7.5	2.9	age	Plio-Miocene	California		Kleinpell, 1938
Demingian	478.6	475	sub-age	Ordovician	North America		Flower, 1957
Derryan	311.7 ± 1.1	308	age	Carboniferous	North America		Thmpson, 1942
Deseadan	29.0	21.0	age	Oligo-Miocene	South America		Flynn & Wisher, 1995
Desmoinesian			age	Carboniferous	North America		Keyes, 1893
Deurnian			age	Miocene	Belgium (obsolete)	Deurne	de Heinzelin (1955)
Devensian	0.116	11,500 BP	age	Pleistocene	Great Britain	Devenses, Celtic tribe by the Deva (England and Wales)	Godwin, 1956
Devonian	416.0 ± 2.8	359.2 ± 2.5	period	Paleozoic	ICS	Devon (England)	Murchison & Sedgwick, 1839
Dewuan	333	318.1 ± 1.3	age	Carboniferous	China		Yang "et al.", 1962
Dinantian	359.2 ± 2.5	326.4 ± 1.6	epoch/sub-period	Carboniferous	Northern Europe	Dinant	Munier-Chalmas & Lapparent, 1893
Dittonian	418		age	Devonian	Wales and England (obsolete)	Ditton Priors, Shropshire, England	King, 1921
Divisaderan	42	36	age	Eocene	South America		Pascual, 1983
Dogger	175.6 ± 2.0	161.2 ± 4.0	epoch	Jurassic	Northern Europe	dogger=ironrich sediment type	Naumann, 1854
Dolgellian	492.5	488.3 ± 1.7	age	Cambrian	regional	Dolgellau, Wales	Harland et al., 1989
Domerian		183.0 ± 1.5	sub-age	Jurassic	regional		Bonarelli, 1894
Donau Glacial	1.7	1.35	age	Pleistocene	Alps	river Danube	Eberl, 1930
Donau-Günz		>2.35	age	Pleistocene	Alps		
Dorogomilovskian	305	303.9 ± 0.9	age	Carboniferous	regional		Ivanov, 1926
Drenthian	0.238	0.17	chronozone	Pleistocene	Northwest Europe	Drenthe	Van Der Vlerk & Florschutz, 1950
Dresbachian	501	496.8	age	Cambrian	North America		Howell, 1944
Drumian	506.5	503	age	Cambrian	ICS	Drum Mountains (Utah, US)	Peng & Robinson, 2000
Duchesnean	42.0	38.0	age	Eocene	North America		Wood "et al"., 1941
Duckmantian			age	Carboniferous	Europe	Duckmanton Railway Cutting, England	Jongmans, 1928
Duntroonian	27.3	25.2	age	Oligocene	New Zealand	Duntroon	Fleming, 1959
Dyeran	524.5	512	age	Cambrian	North America		Palmer, 1998
Eaglefordian			age	Cretaceous	Gulf and Atlantic coast of the US	Eagle Ford, Dallas, Texas	Murray, 1961
Early Imbrian	3,850	3,800	period		Moon	Mare Imbrium	
Eastonian	456	450	age	Ordovician	Australia		Packham, 1968
Eburonian	1.80	1.45	super-age	Pleistocene	Netherlands	Eburones, Germanic tribe	Zagwijn, 1963
Ectasian	1,400	1,200	period	Proterozoic	ICS		Plumb, 1991
Edenian			age	Ordovician	North America		Twenhofel, 1954
Ediacaran	635.5 ± 1.2	542.0 ± 1.0	period	Proterozoic	ICS	Ediacara Hills (Australia)	Cloud, 1972
Edmontonian	80.8	70.7	NALMA	Cretaceous	North America		Russel, 1975
Eemian	0.130	0.116	age	Pleistocene	Northern Europe	river Eem (Netherlands)	Harting, 1875
Eifelian	397.5 ± 2.7	391.8 ± 2.7	age	Devonian	ICS	the Eifel (Germany)	Beyrich, 1837
Egerian	25.8	20.3	age	Oligo-Miocene	Paratethys	Eger (Hungary)	Báldi & Seneš, 1968
Eggenburgian	20.8	18.3	age	Miocene	Paratethys	Eggenburg (Austria)	Steininger & Seneš, 1968
Eildonian	433	428.2 ± 2.3	age	Silurian	Australia		Thomas, 1947
Elsterian	0.465	0.418	age	Pleistocene	Northern Europe	river Weißen Elster (Germany)	Keilhack, 1911
Elvirian	326	324.5	age	Carboniferous	regional		
Emilian	1.5	0.781	sub-age	Pleistocene	Italy		Ruggeri & Selli, 1948
Emscherian	89.5	83.5	age	Cretaceous	Germany		Munier-Chalmas & Lapparent, 1893
Emsian	407.0 ± 2.8	397.5 ± 2.7	age	Devonian	ICS	Bad Ems (Germany)	de Dorlodot, 1900
Ensenadan	1.2	0.8	age	Pleistocene	South America		Ameghino, 1889
Eoarchean	none	3.600	era		ICS		Plumb, 1991
Eocene	55.8 ± 0.2	33.9 ± 0.1	epoch	Paleogene	ICS	earliest recent	Lyell, 1847
Eratosthenian	3,200	1,100	period		Moon	Eratosthenes	
Ergilian	35.1	33.8	ALMA	Oligo-Eocene	Asia		Russell & Zhai, 1987
Erian	391.8 ± 2.7	388	age	Devonian	North America		Dawson, 1871
Famennian	374.5 ± 2.6	359.2 ± 2.5	age	Devonian	ICS	the Famenne (Belgium)	Dumont, 1855
Fassanian	237 ± 2.0	233	sub-age	Triassic	Europe		Mojsisovics, 1895
Fengshanian	492.5	488.3 ± 1.7	age	Cambrian	China		Lu, 1962
Fennian	473	471.8	age	Ordovician	Europe		Fortey & Owens, 1987
Festiniogian	496.8	492.5	age	Cambrian	regional	(anglicised spelling of) Ffestiniog, Wales	Harland et al., 1990
Flaminian	0.5	0.3	age	Pleistocene	Italy		
Flandrian	10,000 BP	present	age	Holocene	Western Europe (obsolete)	Flanders	Rutot & Van den Broeck, 1885
Floian	478.6 ± 1.7	471.8 ± 1.6	age	Ordovician	ICS	Flo (Sweden)	Gradstein "et al", 2004
Florian	508	504	age	Cambrian	Australia		
Fortunian	542.0 ± 1.0	528	age	Cambrian	ICS	Fortune Head (Canada)	Brassier "et al.", 1994
Franconian	496.8	492.5	age	Cambrian	North America		Lapparent, 1893
Frasnian	385.3 ± 2.6	374.5 ± 2.6	age	Devonian	ICS	Frasne (Belgium)	d'Omalius d'Halloy, 1862
Friasian	16.3	15.5	age	Miocene	South America		Kraglievich, 1930
Fujian	11.1	9.5	age	Miocene	Japan		Ikebe, 1977
Fupingan	3,100	2,600	age	Archaean	China		
Furongian	501.0 ± 2.0	488.3 ± 1.7	epoch	Cambrian	ICS	Furong (China)	Cowie & Bassett, 1989
Gallic	130.0 ± 1.5	89.3 ± 1.0	epoch	Cretaceous	obsolete		Smith, 1815
Gargasian	121.0	115.0	sub-age	Cretaceous	regional		Kilian, 1887
Gashatan	56.9	55.7	ALMA	Paleo-Eocene	Asia		Romer, 1966
Gaultian			sub-age [Gault]	Cretaceous	regional		Smith, 1817
Gedinian	416.0 ± 2.8	411.2 ± 2.8	age	Devonian	Belgium (obsolete)	Gedinne	Dumont, 1848
Geiseltalian	48.5	42.7	ELMMZ	Eocene	Europe		Franzel & Haubold, 1986
Gelasian	2.588	1.806	age	Pleistocene	ICS	Gela (Italy)	Rio et al., 1998
Geringian	30.8	26.3	age	Oligocene	North America		Schultz & Falkenbach, 1968
Gisbornian	460.9	456	age	Ordovician	Australia		Thomas, 1960
Givetian	391.8 ± 2.7	385.3 ± 2.6	age	Devonian	ICS	Givet (France)	d'Omalius d'Halloy, 1839
Gleedonian	425.4	422.9 ± 2.5	age	Silurian	regional		Bassett "et al.", 1975
Gorstian	422.9 ± 2.5	421.3 ± 2.6	age	Silurian	ICS	Gorsty (farm at Ludlow, England)	Holland et al., 1980
Gramian	10.3	8.5	age	Miocene	Northern Germany		Hinsch, 1952
Grauvian	50.8	48.5	ELMMZ	Eocene	Europe		Savage & Russell, 1977
Greenlandian	11,700 BP	8,200 BP	age	Holocene	ICS	North Greenland Ice Core Project	
Guadalupian	270.6 ± 0.7	260.4 ± 0.7	epoch	Permian	ICS	Guadalupe Mountains (Texas, US)	Girty, 1908
Guandian	425.5	422	age	Silurian	China		Ting & Wang, 1937
Gulf(-ian)			epoch	Cretaceous	south and east of the US	the Mexican Gulf	Cobban & Reeside, 1952
Günz Glacial	2.35		age	Pleistocene	Alps	river Günz (Germany)	Penck & Bruckner, 1909
Günz-Mindel			age	Pleistocene	Alps		
Gushanian	596.8	501	age	Cambrian	China		Kobayashi, 1935
Guzhangian	503	499	age	Cambrian	ICS	Guzhang (China)	Peng, 1992
Gzhelian	303.9 ± 0.9	299.0 ± 0.8	age	Carboniferous	ICS	Gzhel (Russia)	Nikitim, 1890
Hadean	none	4,000	eon		ICS	Hades, hell	Cloud, 1972
Hadrynian	850	542	age	Neoproterozoic	North America		Fahrig "et al.", 1971
Hallian	~10.000	0	age	Holocene	California		
Haranoyan	18.2	15.97	age	Miocene	Japan		Ikebe, 1977
Harnagian	459	458	age	Ordovician	regional		Bancroft, 1929
Harrisonian	24.8	20.6	age	Oligo-Miocene	North America		Wilson, 1960
Hastarian	359.2 ± 2.5	348	age	Carboniferous	regional		Conil, 1977
Haumurian	84	65.5	age	Cretaceous	New Zealand	Haumuri Bluff	
Hautawan	3.1	2.2	sub-age	Plio-Pleistocene	New Zealand		
Hauterivian	136.4 ± 2.0	130.0 ± 1.5	age	Cretaceous	ICS	Hauterive (Switzerland)	Renevier, 1873
Haweran	10,000 BP	present	age	Holocene	New Zealand	Hawera	Thompson, 1917
Headonian	37.2	33.8	ELMMZ	Oligo-Eocene	Europe		Bosma, 1974
Helikian	1,600	850	age	Proterozoic	North America		Stockwell, 1964
Hemingfordian	20.6	16.3	age	Miocene	North America		Wood "et al.", 1941
Hemmoorian			age	Miocene	Northern Germany		Kautsky, 1925
Hemphillian	10.3	4.9	age	Mio-Pliocene	North America		Wood "et al.", 1941
Heretaungan	49.5	46.2	age	Eocene	New Zealand	Heretaunga Plains	Hornibrook & Harrington, 1957
Hesperian	~3,500	~1,800	Martian epoch		Mars	Hesperia Planum	
Hettangian	199.6 ± 0.6	196.5 ± 1.0	age	Jurassic	ICS	Hettange-Grande (France)	Renevier, 1864
Hirnantian	445.6 ± 1.5	443.7 ± 1.5	age	Ordovician	ICS	Cwm Hirnant (Wales)	Bancroft, 1933
Holkerian	339	337.5	age	Carboniferous	regional		Ramsbotton, 1979
Holocene	11,800 BP	present	epoch	Quaternary	ICS	Greek: totally new	Gervais, 1867
Holsteinian	0.418	0.386	age	Pleistocene	Northern Europe	Holstein (Germany)	Jung, 1957
Homerian	426.2 ± 2.4	422.9 ± 2.5	age	Silurian	ICS	Homer (England)	Bassett et al., 1975
Honghuayuanian	478.6	472	age	Ordovician	China		Yang, 1990
Houldjinian	37.2	33.9	ALMA		Asia		Meng "et al.", 1998
Houthalenian	<21	>16	age	Miocene	Belgium (obsolete)	Houthalen	Hirsch, 1952
Hoxnian	0.418	0.386	age	Pleistocene	Great Britain	Hoxne (Suffolk)	West & Donner, 1956
Hsandgolian	33.8	24.0	ALMA	Oligocene	Asia		Meng "et al"., 1998
Huashibanian	318.1 ± 1.3	313	age	Carboniferous	China		Jin "et al.", 1962
Huayquerian	9.0	6.8	age	Miocene	South America		Pascual & Odreman, 1971
Hutchinsonian	21	20	age	Miocene	New Zealand		Fleming, 1959
Huronian	2,500	1,400	age	Proterozoic	worldwide (obsolete)		Logan & Murray, 1855
Ibexian	~505	471.8	age	Cambrian-Ordovician	North America		Ross, 1951
Icenian	2.4	~2	age	Pleistocene	Netherlands, England (obsolete)	Iceni, ancient tribe (England)	Harmer, 1900
Idamean	497	494	age	Cambrian	Australia		Öpik, 1963
Ilfordian			age	Pleistocene	British Isles	Ilford (England)	Bowen, 1978
Illinoian	0.17	0.125	age	Pleistocene	North America		Chamberlin, 1896
Illyrian	240 ± 2.0	237 ± 2.0	sub-age	Triassic	Europe		Tozer, 1967
Induan	251.0 ± 0.4	249.7 ± 0.7	age	Triassic	ICS	river Indus	Kiparisova & Popov, 1956
Ionian	0.781	0.126	age	Pleistocene	Southern Europe	Ionian Sea (between Greece and Italy)	Carianfi, 1995
Ipswichian	0.130	0.116	age	Pleistocene	Great Britain	Ipswich (England)	West, 1957
Irdinmanhan	46.2	40.4	ALMA	Eocene	Asia		Russell & Zhai, 1987
Irvingtonian	1.8		age	Pleistocene	North America	Irvington	Wood "et al.", 1941
Isuan	3,800	3,500	age	Archaean	Europe		McGregor, 1968
Itaboraian	59	57	age	Paleocene	South America		Paula-coutos, 1946
Ivorean	348	345.3 ± 2.1	age	Carboniferous	regional		Conil, 1977
Jacksonian			age	Eocene	southern US		Heilprin, 1882
Janjukian	30.0	27.5	age	Oligocene	Australia		Hall & Pritchard, 1902
Jeffersonian	475	473	sub-age	Ordovician	North America		Flower, 1979
Jiangshanian	494	489.5	age	Cambrian	ICS		
Jinningian	1,750	800	age	Proterozoic	China		Peng, 2000
Jiusian			age	Carboniferous	China		Jin "et al"., 2000
Johannian	48	35	age	Eocene	Australia		Singleton, 1955
Judithian	82.2	80.8	NALMA	Cretaceous	North America		Russell, 1975
Julian	229.6 ± 2.0	222.5	sub-age	Triassic	Europe		Tozer, 1967 [Mojsisovics, 1895]
Jurassic	199.6 ± 0.6	145.5 ± 4.0	period	Mesozoic	ICS	Jura Mountains	Brongniart, 1829
Kaburan	13.5	11.1	age	Miocene	Japan		Ikebe, 1977
Kaiatan	37.0	36.0	age	Eocene	New Zealand	Kaiata	Fleming, 1959
Kalimnan	4.3	3.4	age	Pliocene	Australia		Hall & Pritchard, 1902
Kansan	0.48	0.26	age	Pleistocene	North America		Geikie, 1894
Kapitean	6.5	5.0	age	Miocene	New Zealand	Kapitea Creek, West Coast Region	Fleming, 1959
Karatau	1,100	800	age	Proterozoic	Russia		
Karoo Ice Age	~360	~260	ice age	Phanerozoic		Karoo (South Africa)	
Karpatian	17.0	16.0	age	Miocene	Paratethys	the Carpathian Mountains	Cicha et al., 1967
Kashirskian	309.2	308.0	age	Carboniferous	Russia		Stepanov, 1962
Kasimovian	306.5 ± 1.0	303.9 ± 0.9	age	Carboniferous	ICS	Kasimov (Russia)	Theodorovich, 1949
Kasterlian	~4.7	~3.6	age	Pliocene	Belgium (obsolete)	Kasterlee	Dumont, 1882
Katian	455.8 ± 1.6	445.6 ± 1.5	age	Ordovician	ICS	Lake Katy (Oklahoma, US)	Bergstrom et al., 2003
Kattendijkian	~5	~3.6	age	Pliocene	Belgium (obsolete)	Kattendijke	Glibert & de Heinzelin, 1957
Kazanian			age	Permian	Russia		Netxaev, 1915
Kechienjian	1.9	1.5	age	Pleistocene	Japan		Ikebe, 1977
Keiloran	443.7 ± 1.5	433	age	Silurian	Australia		
Kekeamuan	28.4	33.9	ALMA		Asia		Wang, 1981
Keuper	±230	199.6	epoch	Triassic	Europe		Von Alberti, 1834
Kimmeridgian	155.7 ± 4.0	150.8 ± 4.0	age	Jurassic	ICS	Kimmeridge (England)	d'Orbigny, 1852
Kinderhookian	359.2 ± 2.5	348	age	Carboniferous	North America		Bizat, 1928
Kinderscoutian	318.1 ± 1.3	317	age	Carboniferous	regional	Kinder Scout (England)	Bisat (1928)
Kirkfield	458	457	age	Ordovician	regional		Liddell, 1975
Kiscellian		25.8	age	Oligocene	Paratethys		Nolf & Brzobohaty, 1994
Klazminskian	303.9 ± 0.9	300.5	age	Carboniferous	regional		Ivanova & Khovorova, 1955
Korangan	117.5	108.4	age	Cretaceous	New Zealand	Koranga	Wellman, 1959
Krevyakinskian	306.5	306	age	Carboniferous	Russia		Ivanova & Khovorova, 1955
Kryzhanovan	1.9	1.2	age	Pleistocene	Eastern Europe		
Kungurian	275.6 ± 0.7	270.6 ± 0.7	age	Permian	ICS	Kungur (Russia)	Stuckenberg, 1890
Lacian	217.4 ± 2.0	211	sub-age		Europe		Mojsisovics, 1895
Ladinian	237.0 ± 2.0	228.0 ± 2.0	age	Triassic	ICS	Ladini, people in northern Italy	Bittner, 1892
Lancefieldian	482	475	age	Ordovician	Australia		Harris & Keble, 1932
Lancian	70.7	65.5	NALMA	Cretaceous	North America		Russell, 1964
Landenian	<60	>55	age	Paleocene	Western Europe (obsolete)	Landen (Belgium)	Dumont, 1839
Landon	34.3	21.7	epoch	Paleo-Neogene	New Zealand	Landon Creek	Kingma, 1962
Langenfeldian			age	Miocene	Northern Germany		
Langhian	15.97	13.65	age	Miocene	ICS	Serravalle Langhe (Italy)	Pareto, 1864
Langsettian	314.5	313.4	age	Carboniferous	regional	Langsett (England)	Jongsmans, 1928
Latdorfian			age	Oligocene	Germany		Mayer-Eymar, 1893
Late Imbrian	3,800	3,200	period		Moon	Mare Imbrium	
Laventan	13.8	12.0	age	Miocene	South America		Madden, 1994
Leonardian			age	Permian	North America		Adams et al., 1939
Lias	199.6 ± 0.6	175.6 ± 2.0	epoch	Jurassic	Northern Europe	unclear	Mantell, 1833 [Smith, 1817]
Likhvinian	0.3	0.18	age	Pleistocene	Eastern Europe		Krasnenkov & Kazantseva, 1993
Lillburnian	15.1	12.7	age	Miocene	New Zealand	Lill Burn, Southland Region	Fleming, 1959
Linxiangian	454.5	449	age	Ordovician	China		
Lishihhuangtuan	1.2	0.1	age	Pleistocene	China		
Livian	335	331	age	Carboniferous	Belgium (obsolete)	Lives	Conil, 1977
Llandeilo (Llandeilean)			epoch/age	Ordovician	Europe	Llandeilo (Wales)	Murchison, 1835
Llandovery	443.7 ± 1.5	428.2 ± 2.3	epoch	Silurian	ICS	Llandovery (Wales)	Murchison, 1859
Llanvirn(-ian)			epoch	Ordovician	Europe	Llanvirn Farm near St Davids, Wales	Hicks (1875, 1881)
Lochkovian	416.0 ± 2.8	411.2 ± 2.8	age	Devonian	ICS	Lochkov (Czech Republic)	Chlupac, 1972
Longfordian	27.5	16.5	age	Oligo-Miocene	Australia		Crespin, 1943
Longmaxian	443.7 ± 1.5	438	age	Silurian	China		Yin, 1949
Longobardian	233	229.6 ± 2.0	sub-age	Triassic	Europe		Mojsisovics, 1895
Longvillian	457	455	age	Ordovician	regional	Cheney Longville (England)	Bancroft, 1929
Longwangmioan	518	513	age	Cambrian	China		Bengston & Jell, 1990
Lopingian	260.4 ± 0.7	251.0 ± 0.4	epoch	Permian	ICS	Luoping (China)	Huang, 1932
Lotharingian	193.3 ± 0.7	189.6 ± 0.7	substage	Jurassic			Haug, 1910
Ludfordian	421.3 ± 2.6	418.7 ± 2.7	age	Silurian	ICS	Ludford (England)	Holland et al., 1980
Ludhamian	~2.52	~2.25	age	Pleistocene	Great Britain	Ludham (England)	Beck et al., 1972
Ludian			age	Eocene	western Europe		de Lapparent, 1893
Ludlovian	422.9 ± 2.5	418.7 ± 2.7	epoch	Silurian	ICS	Ludlow (England)	Murchison, 1854
Luisian	15.5	13.5	age	Miocene	California		Kleinpell, 1938
Lujanian	0.8	0.3	age	Pleistocene	South America		Ameghino 1889
Luliangian	2,350	1,750	age	Proterozoic	China		
Luosuan	318.1	~314	age	Carboniferous	China		Jin et al., 1962
Lutetian	48.6 ± 0.2	40.4 ± 0.2	age	Eocene	ICS	Latin: Lutetia=Paris (France)	de Lapparent, 1883
Maastrichtian	70.6 ± 0.6	65.5 ± 0.3	age	Cretaceous	ICS	Maastricht (Netherlands)	Dumont, 1849
Maentwrogian	501	496.8	age	Cambrian	regional	Maentwrog (Wales)	Hicks, 1881
Malanghuangtuan	0.1	10,000 BP	age	Pleistocene	China		Liu & Chang, 1964
Malm	161.2 ± 4.0	145.5 ± 4.0	epoch	Jurassic	Europe	Old English: malm = calcareous soil	Oppel & Quenstedt, 1858
Mangaorapan	53.0	49.5	age	Eocene	New Zealand	Mangaorapa	Marwick & Fleming, 1959
Mangaotanean	92.1	89.1	age	Cretaceous	New Zealand	Mangaotane	Wellman, 1959
Mangapanian	3.00	2.40	age	Plio-Pleistocene	New Zealand	Mangapani	Fleming, 1953
Maozhangian	513	509	age	Cambrian	China		
Mapingian	310	299.0 ± 0.8	age	Carboniferous	China		Ting, 1928
Marahuan	2.2	1.8	sub-age	Pleistocene	New Zealand		
Marjuman	504	494.5	age	Cambrian	North America		Ludvigsen & Westrop, 1985
Marsdenian	317	315.5	age	Carboniferous	regional	Marsden, West Yorkshire, England	Bisat (1928)
Marshbrookian	455	454	age	Ordovician	regional	Marshbrook (England)	Bancroft, 1929
Mayan	502	501 ± 2.0	age	Cambrian	Russia, Kazakhstan		Yarmoulyuk, 1946
Mayanan	1,100	850	age	Proterozoic	Siberia		Datsenko et al., 1968
Mayoian	12.0	10.0	age	Miocene	South America		Villaroel, 1974
Mayvillian	453	447.5	age	Ordovician	North America		Foerste, 1905
Medinan			age	Silurian	North America		Clark & Schuchert, 1898
Meghalayan	4,200 BP	0	age	Holocene	ICS	Caves of Meghalaya GSSP, India	
Meishuchuan	542	532	age	Cambrian	China		Qian, 1977
Melbournian	428.2 ± 2.3	416.0 ± 2.8	age	Silurian	Australia	Melbourne	Gregory, 1902
Melekesskian	313.4	311.7	age	Carboniferous	Russia		Aisenverg et al., 1979
Menapian		1.03	super-age	Pleistocene	Netherlands	Menapii, Germanic tribe	Zagweijn, 1957
Meramecian	340	333	age	Carboniferous	North America		Ulrich, 1904
Merioneth	501 ± 2	488.3 ± 1.7	epoch	Cambrian	Europe (obsolete)	Merioneth (Wales)	Cowie et al., 1972
Merksemian	~2.5	~2	age	Pleistocene	Belgium (obsolete)	Merksem	de Heinzelin, 1958
Mesoarchean	3,200	2,800	era	Archean	ICS		Plumb, 1991
Mesoproterozoic	1,600	1,000	era	ICS		Hofmann, 1987	
Mesozoic	251.0 ± 0.7	65.5 ± 0.3	era		ICS	middle life	Philips, 1818
Messinian	7.246	5.332	age	Miocene	ICS	Messina (Italy)	Mayer-Eymar, 1867
Miaogoalingian	422	418.7	age	Silurian	China		
Miaolingian	509	497	Epoch	Cambrian	ICS		
Migneintian	486	478.6 ± 1.7	age	Ordovician	Europe		Fortey et al., 1995
Mindel	0.85	0.465	age	Pleistocene	Alps	river Mindel (Germany)	Penck, 1882
Mindel-Riss	0.465	0.238	age	Pleistocene	Alps		
Mindyallan	501	497	age	Cambrian	Australia		Öpik, 1963
Miocene	23.03	5.332	epoch	Neogene	ICS	Greek: less recent	Lyell, 1847
Mississippian	359.2 ± 2.5	318.1 ± 1.3	epoch	Carboniferous	ICS	Mississippi River (US)	Winchell, 1870
Missourian			age	Carboniferous	North America		Keyes, 1873
Mitchellian	10.5	5.0	age	Plio-Miocene	Australia		
Mohawkian	462	451	epoch	Ordovician	North America		Hall, 1842
Mohnian	13.5	7.5	age	Miocene	California		Kleinpell, 1938
Mokolian	2,050	900	age	Proterozoic	South Africa		
Monroecreekian	26.3	24.8	age	Oligocene	North America	Monroe Creek	Wilson, 1960
Montehermosan	6.8	4.0	age	Plio-Miocene	South America	[Hermosean; Ameghino, 1889]	Simpson, 1940
Montezuman	529.5	524.5	age	Cambrian	North America		Palmer, 1998
Montian	~65	~61	age	Paleocene	Europe (obsolete)	Mons (Belgium)	Dewalque, 1868
Moridunian	478.6 ± 1.7	475	age	Ordovician	Europe	Moridunum (Wales)	Fortey & Owens, 1987
Morozovan	0.8	0.5	age	Pleistocene	Eastern Europe		
Morrowan			age	Carboniferous	North America		Adams & Ulrich, 1904
Moscovian	311.7 ± 1.1	306.5 ± 1.0	age	Carboniferous	ICS	Moscow (Russia)	Nikitin, 1890
Motuan	103.3	100.2	age	Cretaceous	New Zealand	Motu River	Wellman, 1959
Muschelkalk	243 ± 2	235 ± 2	epoch	Triassic	Europe	German: limestone with mussels	Füchsel, 1761
Mustersan	48	42	age	Eocene	South America		Kraglievich, 1930
Myachkovskian	307.2	306.5	age	Carboniferous	Russia		Stepanov, 1962
Namibian	900	542	age	Neoproterozoic	South Africa	Namibia	
Namurian	326.4	313.0	age	Carboniferous	Europe	Namur (Belgium)	Purves, 1883
Nanzian	48	35	age	Eocene	California		
Navarroan			age	Cretaceous-Paleocene	south and east of the US	Navarro, Texas	Murray, 1961
Nebraskian	0.93	0.6	age	Pleistocene	North America (obsolete)		Shimek, 1909
Nectarian	3,920	3,850	period		Moon	Mare Nectaris	
Needian	0.42	0.38	age	Pleistocene	Netherlands (obsolete)	Neede	Van der Vlerk & Florschutz, 1950
Nemakit-Daldynian	542	534	age	Cambrian	Russia, Kazakhstan		Savitsky, 1962
Neoarchean	2,800	2,500	era	Archean	ICS		Plumb, 1991
Neocomian	145.5	125.0/130.0	epoch		obsolete	Neocomium, Latin name for Neuchâtel	Thurmann, 1835
Neogene	23.0	2.588	period	Cenozoic	ICS		Hoernes, 1856
Neoproterozoic	1,000	542.0 ± 1.0	era		ICS		Hofmann, 1987
Neporatan	2.5	1.7	age	Pleistocene	Eastern Europe		Esu, 1980
Neustrian	55.0	50.8	ELMMZ	Paleo-Eocene	Europe		Fahlbusch, 1976
Ngaterian	100.2	95.2	age	Cretaceous	New Zealand	Ngateretere	Wellman, 1959
Niagaran			age	Silurian	North America		Sterry Hunt, 1871
Noachian	none	~3,500	Martian epoch		Mars	Noachis Terra	
Noginskian	300.5	299.0 ± 0.8	age	Carboniferous	Russia		Ivanova & Khovorova, 1955
Nomentanan	0.24	0.13	age	Pleistocene	Italy		
Nongshanian	62.9	56.9	ALMA	Paleocene	Asia		Ting, 1998
Norian	216.5 ± 2.0	203.6 ± 1.5	age	Triassic	ICS	Noric Alps (Austria)	Mojsisovics, 1869
Northgrippian	8,200 BP	4,200 BP	age	Holocene	ICS	North Greenland Ice Core Project	
Nukumaruan	3.1	1.8	age	Pleistocene	New Zealand	Nukumaru	Fleming, 1953
Nullaginian	2,500	1,800	age	Proterozoic	Australia		Dunn et al., 1966
Ochoan			age	Permian	North America		Adams et al., 1939
Odesan	1.2	0.8	age	Pleistocene	Eastern Europe		
Okaian	0.5	0.3	sub-age	Ordovician	North America		
Okehuan	1.1	0.37	age	Pleistocene	New Zealand		Fleming, 1962
Older Dryas	13,480 BP	13,350 BP	chron	Weichselian	Europe	Dryas octopetala (plant)	
Oldest Dryas	13,860 BP	13,780 BP	chron	Weichselian	Europe	Dryas octopetala (plant)	
Olenekian	249.5	245.9	age	Triassic	ICS	river Olenyok (Siberia)	Kiparisova & Popov, 1956
Oligocene	33.9 ± 0.1	23.03	epoch	Paleogene	ICS	"not so recent"	Beyrich, 1857
Onnian	453	449	age	Ordovician	regional	River Onny (England)	Bancroft, 1929
Oostermeer Interglacial	0.243	0.238	age	Pleistocene	Netherlands	Oostermeer	
Opoitian	5.0	3.8	age	Pliocene	New Zealand	Opoiti	Fleming, 1959
Ordian	520	510	age	Cambrian	Australia		Öpik, 1968
Ordovician	488.3 ± 1.7	443.7 ± 1.5	period	Paleozoic	ICS	Ordovices, Celtic tribe	Lapworth, 1879
Orellan	33.9	33.3	age	Oligocene	North America		Prothero & Emry, 1996
Orleanian	20.4	15	ELMMZ	Miocene	Europe	Orléans (France)	Alberdi & Aguirre, 1977
Orosirian	2,050	1,800	period	Proterozoic	ICS		Plumb, 1991
Osagean			age	Carboniferous	North America		Branner, 1888
Otaian	21.7	19.0	age	Miocene	New Zealand	Otaio	Fleming, 1959
Ottnangian	18.3	17.0	age	Miocene	Paratethys	Ottnang am Hausruck (Austria)	Papp & Rögl, 1967
Oxfordian	161.2 ± 4.0	155.0 ± 4.0	age	Jurassic	ICS	Oxford (England)	d'Orbigny, 1849
Paibian	501.0 ± 2.0	496	age	Cambrian	ICS	Paibi (China)	Peng et al., 2004
Paleoarchean	3,600	3,200	era	Archean	ICS		Plumb, 1991
Paleocene	65.5 ± 0.3	55.8 ± 0.2	epoch	Paleogene	ICS	oldest recent	Schimper, 1847
Paleophytic	~450	~270	era		paleobotany	old flora	
Paleogene	65.5 ± 0.3	23.0	period	Cenozoic	ICS		Hoernes, 1856
Paleoproterozoic	2,500	1,600	era		ICS		Hofmann, 1987
Paleozoic	542.0 ± 1.0	251.0 ± 0.7	era		ICS	old life	Sedwick, 1838
Pannonian	11.608 ± 0.005	7.246 ± 0.005	age	Miocene	Paratethys	Pannonia (Roman province)	Roth von Telegd, 1879
Pareora	21.7	15.9	epoch	Neogene	New Zealand	Pareora	Kingma, 1957
Pastonian	~1.87	1.77	age	Pleistocene	Great Britain	Paston, Norfolk (England)	West & Wilson, 1966
Payntonian	491	488.3 ± 1.7	age	Cambrian	Australia		Jones, 1971
Peligran	62.5	59	age	Paleocene	South America		Bonaparte, 1993
Pendleian	326.4 ± 1.6	326	age	Carboniferous	regional	Pendle Hill (England)	Hudson & Cotton, 1943
Pennsylvanian	318.1 ± 1.3	299.0 ± 0.8	epoch	Carboniferous	ICS	Pennsylvania (US)	Williams, 1891
Penutian	53	51	age	Eocene	California		Mallory, 1959
Permian	299.0 ± 0.8	251.0 ± 0.4	period	Paleozoic	ICS	Perm (Russia)	Murchison, 1849
Phanerozoic	542.0 ± 1.0	present	eon		ICS	visible life	Chadwick, 1930
Piacenzian	3.600	2.588	age	Pliocene	ICS	Piacenza (Italy)	Mayer-Eymar, 1858
Piripauan	86.5	84	age	Cretaceous	New Zealand	Piripaua	Wellman, 1959
Pleistocene	2.588	11,700 BP	epoch	Quaternary	ICS	youngest recent	Lyell, 1833
Pleniglacial	73,000 BP	14,500 BP	sub-age	Pleistocene	Northern Europe		
Pliensbachian	189.6 ± 1.5	183.0 ± 1.5	age	Jurassic	ICS	Pliensbach (Germany)	Oppel, 1858
Pliocene	5.332	2.588	epoch	Neogene	ICS	newer recent	Lyell, 1847
Podolskian	308	307.2	age	Carboniferous	Russia		Ivanov, 1926
Poederlian	~3.5	~2.5	age	Pliocene	Belgium (obsolete)	Poederlee	Vincent, 1889
Pontian	7.246 ± 0.005	5.332 ± 0.005	epoch	Miocene	Paratethys	Pontus Euxinus, Latin name for the Black Sea	Le Play, 1842
Pontinian	0.1	10,000 BP	age	Pleistocene	Italy		Blanc, 1937
Porangan	46.2	43.0	age	Eocene	New Zealand	Poranga	Hornibrook, 1961
Portlandian			age	Jurassic	British Isles	Isle of Portland (England)	Brongniart, 1829
Potsdamian	501 ± 2	488.3 ± 1.7	epoch	Cambrian	Germany		Walcott, 1891
Poundian	570	542 ± 0.3	age	Cambrian	Australia		
Pragian	411.2 ± 2.8	407.0 ± 2.8	age	Devonian	ICS	Prague (Czech Republic)	Ziegler, 1979
Preboreal	11,560 BP	10,640 BP	chron		Northern Europe	before the Boreal	
Precambrian	none	542.0 ± 1.0	none (before: eon)		worldwide	before the Cambrian	Logan, 1841
Pre-Illinoian			age	Pleistocene	North America	before the Illinoian	Leverett, 1929
Preludhamian	~2.52	~2.61	age	Plio-Pleistocene	Great Britain	before the Ludhamian	Funnell & West, 1977
Prenectarian	4,567	3,850	period		Moon	before the Nectarian	
Prepastonian	~2.0	~1.87	age	Pleistocene	Great Britain	before the Pastonian	West, 1980
Pretiglian	2.588	2.40	super-age	Pleistocene	Netherlands	before the Tiglian Tegelen (The Netherlands)	Van der Vlerk, 1948
Priabonian	37.2 ± 0.1	33.9 ± 0.1	age	Eocene	ICS	Priabona (Italy)	Munier-Chalmas & De Lapparent, 1893
Pridoli(an)	418.7 ± 2.7	416.0 ± 2.8	epoch	Silurian	ICS	Přidoli (Czech Republic)	Prantl & Pribyl, 1948
Proterozoic	2,500	542.0 ± 1.0	eon		ICS		Emmons, 1888
Puercan	65.5	63.3	age	Paleocene-Cretaceous	North America		Wood et al., 1941
Purbeckian			age	Cretaceous-Jurassic	England (obsolete)	Isle of Purbeck (England)	Brongniart, 1829
Pusgillian	449	447.5	age	Ordovician	Europe	Pus Gill, Cumbria (England)	Dean, 1959
Putikian	0.37	10,000 BP	age	Pleistocene	New Zealand		Fleming, 1953
Quaternary	2.588	present	period	Cenozoic	ICS	fourth part	Arduino, 1760
Qungzusian	532	523	age	Cambrian	China		
Rancholabrean			age	Pleistocene	North America		Wood et al., 1941
Randian	3,000	2,500	age	Archaean	South Africa		Kent & Hughes, 1978
Rawtheyan	446.5	445.5	age	Ordovician	Europe	River Rawthey (England)	Brenchley & Cocks, 1982
Refugian	35.0	33.5	age	Oligo-Eocene	California		Schenck & Kleinpell, 1936
Reinbekian			age	Miocene	Northern Germany		Van Couvering, 1977
Relizian	16.5	13.5	age	Miocene	California		Kleinpell, 1934
Repettian	2.9	2.2	age	Plio-Pleistocene	California		Natalnd, 1952
Reuverian	3.5	2.558	chronozone	Pliocene	Northwest Europe	Reuver (The Netherlands)	Bifnot, 1972
Rhaetian	203.6 ± 1.5	199.6 ± 0.6	age	Triassic	ICS	Rhaetian Alps (Switzerland, Austria, Italy)	Gümbel, 1862
Rhuddanian	443.7 ± 1.5	439.0 ± 1.8	age	Silurian	ICS	Cwm-Rhuddian (Wales)	Cocks et al., 1971
Rhyacian	2,300	2,050	period	Proterozoic	ICS		Cowie 6 Basset, 1989
Richmondian	449	445.6 ± 1.5	age	Ordovician	North America		Winchell & Ulrich 1897
Riochican	57	54	age	Eo-Paleocene	South America		Simpson, 1940
Riphean	1,650	650	age	Proterozoic	worldwide (obsolete)		Shatsky, 1945
Riss Glacial	0.238	0.128	age	Pleistocene	Alps	river Riß (Germany)	
Riss-Würm Interglacial	0.128	0.116	age	Pleistocene	Alps		Penck, 1882 [Penck & Burckner, 1909]
Roadian	270.6 ± 0.7	268.0 ± 0.7	age	Permian	ICS		Furnish, 1968
Robiacian	42.7	37.2	ELMMZ	Miocene	Europe		Savage & Russell, 1983
Romanian	3.6	1.8	age	Plio-Pleistocene	Paratethys		Krejci-Graf, 1932
Rotliegend(-es)	299	270.6	sub-period	Permian	unofficial	German for "Red foot wall".	A traditional copper mining term in the Mansfelder Land for the red oreless sandstone below the Kupferschiefer.
Runangan	36.0	34.3	age	Eo-Oligocene	New Zealand	Runanga	Finlay et al., 1945
Rupelian	33.9 ± 0.1	28.4 ± 0.1	age	Oligocene	ICS	river Rupel (Belgium)	Dumont, 1850
Ruscinian	4.9	3.5	ELMMZ	Pliocene	Europe	Ruscino, Latin for the Roussillon (France)	Kretzoi, 1962
Saalian	0.238	0.128	age	Pleistocene	Northern Europe	river Saale (Germany)	Stille, 1920
Sakian	494.5	493	age	Cambrian	Russia, Kazakhstan		Ergaliev, 1980
Sakmarian	294.6 ± 0.8	284.4 ± 0.7	age	Permian	ICS	river Sakmara (Russia)	Karpinski, 1874
Sandbian	460.9 ± 1.6	455.8 ± 1.6	age	Ordovician	ICS	Sandby, Sweden	Begstrom et al., 2003
Sangamonian	0.125	75,000 BP	age	Pleistocene	North America		Leverett, 1898
Santacrucian	17.5	16.3	age	Miocene	South America		Ameghino, 1889
Santomian	1.81	1.5	sub-age	Pleistocene	Italy		
Santonian	85.8 ± 0.7	83.5 ± 0.7	age	Cretaceous	ICS	Saintes (France)	Coquand, 1873
Sarmatian	12.7	11.6	age	Miocene	Paratethys	Sarmatians (ancient people)	Suess, 1866
Saxonian	~290	~258	age	Permian	Europe (obsolete)	Saxony	Munier-Chalmas & Lapparent, 1893
Saucesian	22.0	16.5	age	Miocene	California		Kleinpell, 1938
Scaldisian	~4	~2.5	age	Pliocene	Belgium (obsolete)	Scaldus, Latin name for the river Scheldt	Dumont, 1850
Scythian	251 ± 0.2	245 ± 1.5	Epoch	Early Triassic	Europe	Scythia	Arthaber, 1895
Selandian	61.7 ± 0.2	58.7 ± 0.2	age	Paleocene	ICS	Seeland (Denmark)	Rosenkrantz, 1924
Senecan	388	370	age	Devonian	North America		Clarke & Schuchert, 1898
Senonian	89.3	65.5	epoch	Cretaceous	unofficial	Sens (France)	d'Orbigny, 1842
Serpukhovian	326.4 ± 1.6	318.1 ± 1.3	age	Carboniferous	ICS	Serpukhov (Russia)	Nikitin, 1890
Serravallian	13.65	11.608	age	Miocene	ICS	Serravalle Scrivia (Italy)	Pareto, 1864
Sevatian	206	202.3 ± 1.5	sub-age	Triassic	Europe		Mojsisovics, 1895
Shanghuan	65.5	62.9	ALMA	Paleocene	Asia		Ting & Li, 1983
Shangsian		318.1	age	Carboniferous	China		Ting, 1931
Shaodongian	359.2 ± 2.5	349.5	age	Carboniferous	China		Hou, 1962
Sharamurunian	40.4	37.2	ALMA	Eocene	Asia		Russell & Zhai, 1987
Sheinwoodian	428.2 ± 2.3	426.2 ± 2.4	age	Silurian	ICS	Sheinwood (England)	Basset et al., 1975
Shermanian	457	454	age	Ordovician	regional		Kay, 1937
Shinulanian	438	433	age	Silurian	China		Ting, 1930
Sicilian	0.781	0.260	sub-age	Pleistocene	Italy	Sicily	Doderlein, 1872
Siderian	2,500	2,300	period	Proterozoic	ICS		Plumb, 1991
Silesian	326.4	299.0	subperiod	Carboniferous	Europe	Silesia	Leckwijck, 1960
Siegenian			age	Devonian	North America, Europe		Kayser, 1885
Silurian	443.7 ± 1.5	416.0 ± 2.8	period	Paleozoic	ICS	Silures, Celtic tribe	Murchison, 1835
Sinemurian	196.5 ± 1.0	189.6 ± 1.5	age	Jurassic	ICS	Semur-en-Auxois (France)	d'Orbigny, 1842
Sinian	800	542	age	Neoproterozoic	China		Willis et al., 1907
Soudleyan	458	457	age	Ordovician	regional	Soudley (England)	Bancroft, 1929
Southland	15.9	10.9	epoch	Neogene	New Zealand	Southland Region	Kingma, 1965
Springerian			age	Carboniferous	North America		
St. David's	513 ± 2	501 ± 2	epoch	Cambrian	Europe (obsolete)	St Davids (Wales)	Cowie et al., 1972
Stampian			age	Oligocene	western Europe	Étampes (France)	d'Orbigny, 1852
Statherian	1,800	1,600	period	Proterozoic	ICS		Plumb, 1991
Stenian	1,200	1,000	period	Proterozoic	ICS		Cowie & Basset, 1989
Stephanian	303.9	299.0	age	Carboniferous	Europe	Saint-Étienne (France)	Mayer-Eymar, 1878
Steptoan	494.5	493	age	Cambrian	North America		Ludvigsen & westrop, 1985
Streffordian	452	449	age	Ordovician	Europe	Strefford (England)	Williams et al., 1972
Sturtian	~730		age	Neoproterozoic	worldwide, unofficial		Gregory, 1927
Subatlantic	2,400 BP	0	chron	Holocene	Northern Europe		Sernander, 1889
Subboreal	5,660 BP	2,400 BP	chron	Holocene	Northern Europe		Sernander, 1889
Suchian	3.0	1.9	age	Plio-Pleistocene	Japan		Ikebe, 1977
Suevian	33.8	29.2	ELMMZ	Oligocene	Europe		Tobien, 1980
Sunwaptan	493	491	age	Cambrian	North America		Ludvigsen & Westrop, 1985
Susterian	8.5	5.3	chronozone	Miocene	Northwest Europe	Susteren (The Netherlands)	Van Der Hammenn et al., 1971
Swazian	4,000	3,000	age	Archaean	South Africa		Kent & Hughes, 1978
Syltian			age	Miocene	Northern Germany		Staesche, 1930
Tabenbulakian	24.0	23.03	ALMA	Oligocene	Asia		Meng & McKenna, 1998
Tangbagouan	359.2		age	Carboniferous	China		Jin et al., 2000
Taranaki	10.9	5.28	epoch	Neogene	New Zealand	Taranaki Region	Kingma, 1962
Tarantian	0.15	11,500 BP	age	Pleistocene	Southern Europe	Tarento (Italy)	Castradori & Cita, 1995
Tatarian			age	Permian	Russia	Tatarstan	Nikitin, 1887
Taxandrian	1.80	0.418	super-age	Pleistocene	Netherlands (obsolete)		Van Der Vlerk & Florschutz, 1950
Tayloran			age	Cretaceous	south and west of the US	Taylor, Texas	Murray, 1961
Telychian	436.0 ± 1.9	428.2 ± 2.3	age	Silurian	ICS	Pen-lan-Telych (Wales)	Cocks et al. 1973
Templetonian	510	508	age	Cambrian	Australia		Whitehouse, 1936
Teratan	89.1	86.5	age	Cretaceous	New Zealand	Te Rata, Gisborne Region	Wellman, 1959
Terreneuvian	542.0 ± 1.0	521	epoch	Cambrian	ICS	Terre-Neuve, French name for Newfoundland	Narbonne, 1987
Tertiary	65.5 ± 0.3	2.588	sub-era	Cenozoic	worldwide	third part	Arduino, 1760
Teurian	65.0	55.5	age	Paleocene	New Zealand	Te Uri	Hornibrook & Harrington, 1957
Thanetian	58.7 ± 0.2	55.8 ± 0.2	age	Paleocene	ICS	Isle of Thanet (England)	Renevier, 1874
Thuringian	285	251	age	Permian)	Europe (obsolete)	Thuringia (Germany)	Renevier, 1874
Thurnian	~2.25	~2.12	age	Pleistocene	Great Britain	River Thurne (England}	West, 1961
Tiffanian	60.2	56.8	age	Paleocene	North America		Granger, 1917
Tiglian	2.40	1.80	super-age	Pleistocene	Netherlands	Tegelen (The Netherlands)	Dubois, 1905
Tinguirirican	36	29	age	Oligo-Eocene	South America		Flynn & Wyss, 2004
Tithonian	150.8 ± 4.0	145.5 ± 4.0	age	Jurassic	ICS	Tithon (Greek mythology)	Oppel, 1865
Tiupampan	64.5	62.5	age	Paleocene	South America	Tiupampa	Marshall & de Muizon, 1988
Toarcian	183.0 ± 1.5	175.6 ± 2.0	age	Jurassic	ICS	Thouars (France)	d'Orbigny, 1849
Toyonian	518.5	513.0 ± 2.0	age	Cambrian	Russia, Kazakhstan		Hill, 1964
Tommotian	534	530	age	Cambrian	Russia, Kazakhstan		Rozanov et al., 1966
Tongaporutuan	10.9	6.5	age	Miocene	New Zealand	Tongaporutu, Taranaki Region	Fleming, 1959
Tongrian			age	Oligocene	western Europe		Dumont, 1839
Tonian	1,000	850	period	Proterozoic	ICS		Cowie & Bassler, 1989
Torrejonian	63.3	60.2	age	Paleocene	North America		wood et al., 1941
Tortonian	11.608	7.246	age	Miocene	ICS	Tortona (Italy)	Mayer-Eymar, 1858
Totomian	3.6	3.0	age	Pliocene	Japan		Ikebe, 1977
Tournaisian	359.2 ± 2.5	345.3 ± 2.1	age	Carboniferous	ICS	Tournai (Belgium)	Dumont, 1832
Tozawan	15.97	13.5	age	Miocene	Japan		Ikebe, 1977
Treenean	0.17	0.15	chronozone	Pleistocene	Northwest Europe		
Tremadoc(-ian)	488.3 ± 1.7	478.6 ± 1.7	epoch	Ordovician	ICS	Tremadoc Bay (Wales)	Sedgwick, 1846
Trempealeauan	492.5	488.3 ± 1.7	age	Cambrian	North America		
Trentonian			age	Carboniferous	North America		
Triassic	251.0 ± 0.4	199.6 ± 0.6	period	Mesozoic	ICS	threefold	Von Alberti, 1834
Tubantian	0.116	11,500 BP	age	Pleistocene	Netherlands (obsolete)		Van der Vlerk & Florschütz, 1950
Turolian	8.7	4.9	ELMMZ	Mio-Pliocene	Europe	Turolium, Latin for Teruel (Spain)	Crusafont, 1965
Turonian	93.5 ± 0.8	89.3 ± 1.0	age	Cretaceous	ICS	Tours (France)	d'Orbigny, 1842
Tuvalian	222.5	217.4 ± 2.0	sub-age	Triassic	Europe		Mojsisovics, 1895
Tyrrhenian	0.26	11,430 BP	sub-age	Pleistocene	Italy	Tyrrhenian Sea	Issel, 1914
Ufimian	268	270,6	age	Permian	obsolete		Netxaev, 1915
Uintan	46.2	42.0	age	Eocene	North America		Wood et al., 1941
Ulangochuian	37.2	35.1	ALMA	Eocene	Asia		Li & Ting, 1983
Ulatisian	51	48	age	Eocene	California		Mallory, 1959
Ulsterian			age	Devonian	North America		Clarke & Schuchert, 1898
Undillian	506	504	age	Cambrian	Australia		Opik, 1979
Uquian	3.0	1.2	age	Plio-Pleistocene	South America	Uquia (Argentina)	Castellanos, 1923
Urutawan	108.4	103.3	age	Cretaceous	New Zealand	Urutawa Hill	Wellman, 1959
Vaalian	2,500	2,050	age	Proterozoic	South Africa		Kent & Hugh, 1978
Valanginian	140.2 ± 3.0	136.4 ± 2.0	age	Cretaceous	ICS	Valangin (Switzerland)	Desor, 1853
Vallesian	11.1	8.7	ELMMZ	Miocene	Europe	The Vallès (Spain)	Crusafont, 1950
Vendian	~610	542.0 ± 1.0	sub-era	Proterozoic	worldwide (obsolete)		Murchison, 1835
Venturian	2.2	1.9	age	Pleistocene	California		Natland, 1953
Vereiskian	311.7 ± 1.1	309.2	age	Carboniferous	Russia		
Vierlandian			age	Miocene	Northern Germany		
Vicksburgian			age	Oligocene	southern US		Heilprin, 1882
Villafranchian	3.5	1.1	ELMMZ	Plio-Pleistocene	Europe		Pareto, 1865
Virgilian			age	Carboniferous	North America		Moore, 1932
Visean	345.3 ± 2.1	326.4 ± 1.6	age	Carboniferous	ICS	Visé (Belgium)	Dumont, 1832
Vraconian			sub-age	Cretaceous	regional		Renevier, 1867
Waalian	1.45	1.20	super-age	Pleistocene	Netherlands	river Waal	Zagwijn, 1960
Waiauan	12.7	10.9	age	Miocene	New Zealand	Waiau River, Southland Region	Fleming, 1959
Waipawan	55.5	53.0	age	Eocene	New Zealand	Waipawa	Hornibrook & Harrington, 1957
Waipipian	3.60	3.00	age	Pliocene	New Zealand	Waipipi	Fleming, 1953
Waitakian	25.2	21.7	age	Oligo-Miocene	New Zealand	Waitaki River	Fleming, 1959
Waitotaran	3.8	3.1	sub-age	Pliocene	New Zealand	Waitotara River	Fleming, 1953
Waltonian		~2.52	age	Pliocene	Great Britain	Walton-on-the-Naze	Harmer, 1900
Wanganui	5.28	present	epoch	Neogene-Quaternary	New Zealand	Whanganui	Kingma, 1962
Wangerripian			age	Paleo-Eocene	Australia		Singleton, 1953
Warendian	485	478.6	age	Ordovician	Australia		Jones et al., 1971
Warthian	0.15	0.13	chronozone	Pleistocene	Northwest Europe		
Wasatchian	55.4	50.3	age	Eocene	North America		McGrew & Roehler, 1960
Waucoban			epoch	Cambrian	North America		Walcott, 1912
Weichselian	0.116	11,500 BP	age		Northern Europe	Weichsel, German name for the river Vistula (Poland)	Keilhack, 1926
Wenlock(-ian)	428.2 ± 2.3	422.9 ± 2.5	epoch	Silurian	ICS	Much Wenlock (England)	Murchison, 1833
Werrikooian	1.806	1.00	age	Pleistocene	Australia		Hall & Pritchard, 1902
Westphalian	313.0	303.9	age	Carboniferous	Europe	Westphalia (Germany)	de Lapparent & Munier-Chalmas, 1892
Whaingaroan	34.3	27.3	age	Oligocene	New Zealand	Whaingaroa, Waikato Region	Finlay & Marwick, 1947
Wheelerian	1.9	11,430 BP	age	Pleistocene	California		Natland, 1953
Whiterockian	471.8 ± 1.6	462	age	Ordovician	North America		Cooper, 1956
Whitlandian	475	473.5	age	Ordovician	Europe	Whitland (Wales)	Owens & Fortey, 1987
Whitneyan	33.3	30.8	age	Oligocene	North America		Wood, 1937
Whitwellian	426.2 ± 2.4	425.4	age	Silurian	regional	Whitwell Coppice (England)	Bassett et al., 1975
Wisconsinan	75,000 BP	10,000 BP	age	Pleistocene	North America		Geikie, 1894
Wolfcampian			age	Permian	North America		Udden, 1917
Wolstonian	0.238	0.128	age	Pleistocene	Great Britain	Wolston (England)	West & Donner, 1956
Woodbinian			age	Cretaceous	Gulf and Atlantic coast of the US		Murray, 1961
Wordian	268.0 ± 0.7	265.8 ± 0.7	age	Permian	ICS		Udden, 1916
Wuchenghuangtuan	2.4	1.2	age	Pleistocene	China		
Wuchiapingian	260.4 ± 0.7	253.8 ± 0.7	age	Permian	ICS		Kaimera & Nakazawa, 1973 [Sheng, 1962]
Wuliuan	509	504.5	age	Cambrian	ICS		
Würm Glacial	0.116	11,500 BP	age	Pleistocene	Alps	river Würm (Germany)	Penck & Bruckner, 1909
Wutaian	2,600	2,350	age	Archaean-Proterozoic	China		Zhang, 1951
Xiaodushanian		299	age	Carboniferous	China		zhou et al., 1987
Xiushanian	429	425.5	age	Silurian	China		Ge, 1980
Yanguan	349.5	345	age	Carboniferous	China		
Yarmouthian	0.26	0.17	age	Pleistocene	North America	Aegean Sea	Leverett, 1898
Yatalan	3.4	2.0	age	Plio-Pleistocene	Australia		Ludbrook, 1963
Yeadonian	315.5	314.5	age	Carboniferous	regional	Yeadon (England)	Hudson, 1945
Younger Dryas	12,700 BP	11,560 BP	chron	Weichselian	Northern Europe	Dryas octopetala (plant)	
Ypeenian	470	468.1	age	Ordovician	Australia		
Ypresian	55.8 ± 0.2	48.6 ± 0.2	age	Eocene	ICS	Ypres, French name for Ieper (Ieper) in Belgium	Dumont, 1849
Ynezian	61.5	55.8	age	Paleocene	California		Mallory, 1959
Yuian	9.5	3.6	age	Plio-Miocene	Japan		Ikebe, 1977
Yurmatian	1,375	1,100	age	Proterozoic	Russia		Keller, 1952
Yuzanjian	1.5	0.75	age	Pleistocene	Japan		Ikebe, 1977
Zanclean	5.332	3.60	age	Pliocene	ICS	Zancla, old name for Messina (Italy)	Sequenza, 1868
Zechstein	±270	±250	sub-period	Permian	Europe (unofficial)		Lehmann, 1756
Zemorrian	33.5	22.0	age	Oligo-Miocene	California		Kleinpell, 1938
Zhungxian	505	501	age	Cambrian	China		
Zuzhungian	509	503	age	Cambrian	China		

== See also ==
- Astronomical chronology
  - Age of the Earth
  - Age of the universe
- Chronological dating, archaeological chronology
  - Absolute dating
  - Relative dating
  - Phase (archaeology)
  - Archaeological association
- Geochronology
  - Chronostratigraphy
  - Future of the Earth
  - Geologic time scale
  - Geological history of Earth
  - Plate reconstruction
  - Plate tectonics
  - Thermochronology
  - Timeline of natural history
- General
  - Consilience, evidence from independent, unrelated sources can "converge" on strong conclusions

== Literature ==
- Basset, M. G.; Cocks, L. R. M.; Holland, C. H.; Rickards, R. B.; and Warren, P. T.; 1975: The type Wenlock series, Report of the Institute of Geological Sciences, 75(13), pp. 1–19.
- Cocks, L. R. M.; Holland, C. H.; Rickards, R. B.; and Strachan, I.; 1971: A correlation of Silurian rocks in the British Isles, Journal of the Geological Society 127(2), pp. 103–136.
- Gradstein, F. M.; Ogg, J. G.; and Smith, A. G.; 2004: A Geologic Time Scale 2004, Cambridge University Press, Cambridge, ISBN 0-521-78142-6.
- Hoffmann, K.-H.; Condon, D. J.; Bowring, S. A.; and Crowley, J. L.; 2004: U-Pb zircon date from the Neoproterozoic Ghaub Formation, Namibia: Constraints on Marinoan glaciation, Geology 32(9), pp. 817–820.
- Holland, C. H.; Lawson, J. D.; Walmsley, V. G.; and White D. E.; 1980: Ludlow stages, Lethaia 13, p. 268, ISSN 0024-1164.
- Menning, M.; Alekseev, A. S.; Chuvashov, B. I.; Davydov, V. I.; Devuyst, F.-X.; Forke, H. C.; Grunt, T. A.; Hance, L.; Heckel, P. H.; Izokh, N. G.; Jin, Y.-G.; Jones, P. J.; Kotlyar, G. V.; Kozur, H. W.; Nemyrovska, T. I.; Schneider, J. W.; Wang, X.-D.; Weddige, K., Weyer, D.; and Work, D. M.; 2005: Global time scale and regional stratigraphic reference scales of Central and West Europe, East Europe, Tethys, South China, and North America as used in the Devonian–Carboniferous–Permian Correlation Chart 2003 (DCP 2003), Palaeogeography, Palaeoclimatology, Palaeoecology 240, pp. 318–372.
- Rio, D.; Sprovieri, R.; Castradori, D.; and Di Stefano, E.; 1998: The Gelasian Stage (Upper Pliocene): a new unit of the global standard chronostratigraphic scale, Episodes 21(2), pp. 82–87.
