= Gallic epoch =

Obsolete geological epoch

The Gallic epoch is an obsolete epoch of the Mesozoic Era's Cretaceous, the latter being a geologic period and system that spans 77 million years from the end of the Jurassic Period 143.1 million years ago (mya) to the beginning of the Paleogene Period 66 mya. The Gallic epoch encompasses the Barremian, Aptian, Albian, Cenomanian and Turonian faunal stages (125.77-89.8 ± 0.3 mya). It is part of the system of geochronological units historically used for describing the Cretaceous System within Europe.

In the system of the International Commission on Stratigraphy, the Gallic corresponds to the later part of the Early Cretaceous epoch and the early part of the Late Cretaceous.

== See also ==
- List of geochronologic names
