= Piacenzian =

Latest age of the Pliocene

- 3.600 – 2.58 Ma

Chronology
← / Messinian salinity crisis; ← / North American prairie expands
Subdivision of the Neogene according to the ICS, as of 2024. Vertical axis scale: Millions of years ago
- Formerly part of: Tertiary Period/System

Etymology
- Name formality: Formal

Usage information
- Celestial body: Earth
- Regional usage: Global (ICS)
- Time scale(s) used: ICS Time Scale

Definition
- Chronological unit: Age
- Stratigraphic unit: Stage
- Time span formality: Formal
- Lower boundary definition: Base of Gauss/Gilbert (C2An/C2Ar) magnetic reversal
- Lower boundary GSSP: Punta Piccola Section, Porto Empedocle, Sicily, Italy; 37.2889°N 13.4933°E
- Lower GSSP ratified: January 1997
- Upper boundary definition: Base of magnetic polarity chronozone C2r (Matuyama); Extinction of the Haptophytes Discoaster pentaradiatus and Discoaster surculus
- Upper boundary GSSP: Monte San Nicola Section, Gela, Sicily, Italy; 37.1469°N 14.2035°E
- Upper GSSP ratified: 1996 (as base of Gelasian)

The Piacenzian is, in the international geologic time scale, the upper stage or latest age of the Pliocene. It spans the time between 3.6 ± 0.005 Ma and 2.58 Ma (million years ago). The Piacenzian is after the Zanclean and is followed by the Gelasian (part of the Pleistocene).

The Piacenzian is roughly coeval with the European land mammal age MN 16, overlaps the late Chapadmalalan and early Uquian South American land mammal age and falls inside the more extensive Blancan North American land mammal age. It also correlates with the Astian, Redonian, Reuverian and Romanian regional stages of Europe, and the Waipipian and Mangapanian stages of New Zealand. Some authorities describe the British Red Crag Formation and Waltonian Stage as late Piacenzian, while others regard them as early Pleistocene.

Carbon dioxide levels during the Piacenzian were similar to those of today, making this age, with global mean temperature 2–3 °C (3.6–5.4 °F) higher and sea levels about 20 metres (66 feet) higher than today, an important analogue for predictions of the future of our world.

== Definition ==
The Piacenzian was introduced in scientific literature by Swiss stratigrapher Karl Mayer-Eymar in 1858. It is named after the Italian city of Piacenza.

The base of the Piacenzian is at the base of the Gauss chronozone and at the extinction of the planktonic forams Globorotalia margaritae and Pulleniatina primalis. The GSSP for the Piacenzian Stage is at Punta Piccola on Sicily, Italy.

The top of the Piacenzian (the base of the Quaternary System and the Pleistocene Series) is defined magnetostratigraphically as the base of the Matuyama (C2r) chronozone (at the Gauss-Matuyama reversal), and isotopic stage 103. Above this point there are notable extinctions of the calcareous nannofossils: Discoaster pentaradiatus and Discoaster surculus.

== Climate ==
The Piacenzian was the last age before the Quaternary glaciations started to take hold in the Northern hemisphere. The ice sheet of Antarctica was also less prominent than today and sea levels were approximately 20 metres (66 feet) higher than the present. The global mean temperature was 2–3 °C (3.6–5.4 °F) warmer than the pre-industrial temperature. During the Mid-Piacenzian Warm Period the concentration of carbon dioxide peaked at approximately 389 ppm (in the range 381–427 ppm with 95% confidence), thus similar to the concentration during the 2010s. The Piacenzian can therefore be used as an analogue to the future climate and sea level to expect if the carbon dioxide concentration stabilizes at this level. In particular, the KM5c interglacial during the Mid-Piacenzian Warm Period occurred during an orbital configuration close to the current situation, with similar geographical distribution of solar insolation.

Climate of the Piacenzian would have started as a somewhat wet and warm period in North America occurring just after a brief cooling period of the Zanclean. Deposition of sediments and mollusks of the Piacenzian correspond with the rise in sea level creating the Tamiami Subsea and Jackson Subsea of Florida, Duplin Subsea generally of South Carolina, and Yorktown Subsea of the Outer Banks and inland North Carolina. Dates have been established on the basis of the genera and species of mollusks found.

In Namibia, the Piacenzian from 3.1 Ma onwards is associated with the spread of Renosterveld-like vegetation dependent on winter rainfall, which is attributable to a strong advection of polar waters along the coast of southwestern Africa and a northward shift of the Polar Front Zone in the Southern Ocean.

== Origin of the genus Homo ==
The late Piacenzian may be when the genus Homo developed out of the ancestral genus Australopithecus. While the oldest known fossils unambiguously identified as Homo habilis date to just after the end of the Piacenzian (2.58 Ma), a fossilized jawbone that exhibits traits that are transitional between Australopithecus and Homo habilis was discovered in the Afar Triangle in 2015. The find was made by Ethiopian student Chalachew Seyoum at a site called Ledi-Geraru between the Mille and Awash rivers, in Afar Regional State (near 11.36°N 40.86°E). Based on geological evidence from the Afar region, the individual would have lived just after a major climate shift, during which forests and waterways were rapidly replaced by arid savanna. Regarding the Afar region, and as stated in the journal Science: "Vertebrate fossils record a faunal turnover indicative of more open and probable arid habitats than those reconstructed earlier in this region, in broad agreement with hypotheses addressing the role of environmental forcing in hominin evolution at this time." This interpretation is consistent with hypotheses that emphasize the savanna as the ancestral environment which shaped the evolution of early Homo and other hominins.
