= Barremian =

Fourth age and stage of the Early/Lower Cretaceous

- 125.77 – 121.4 ± 0.6 Ma
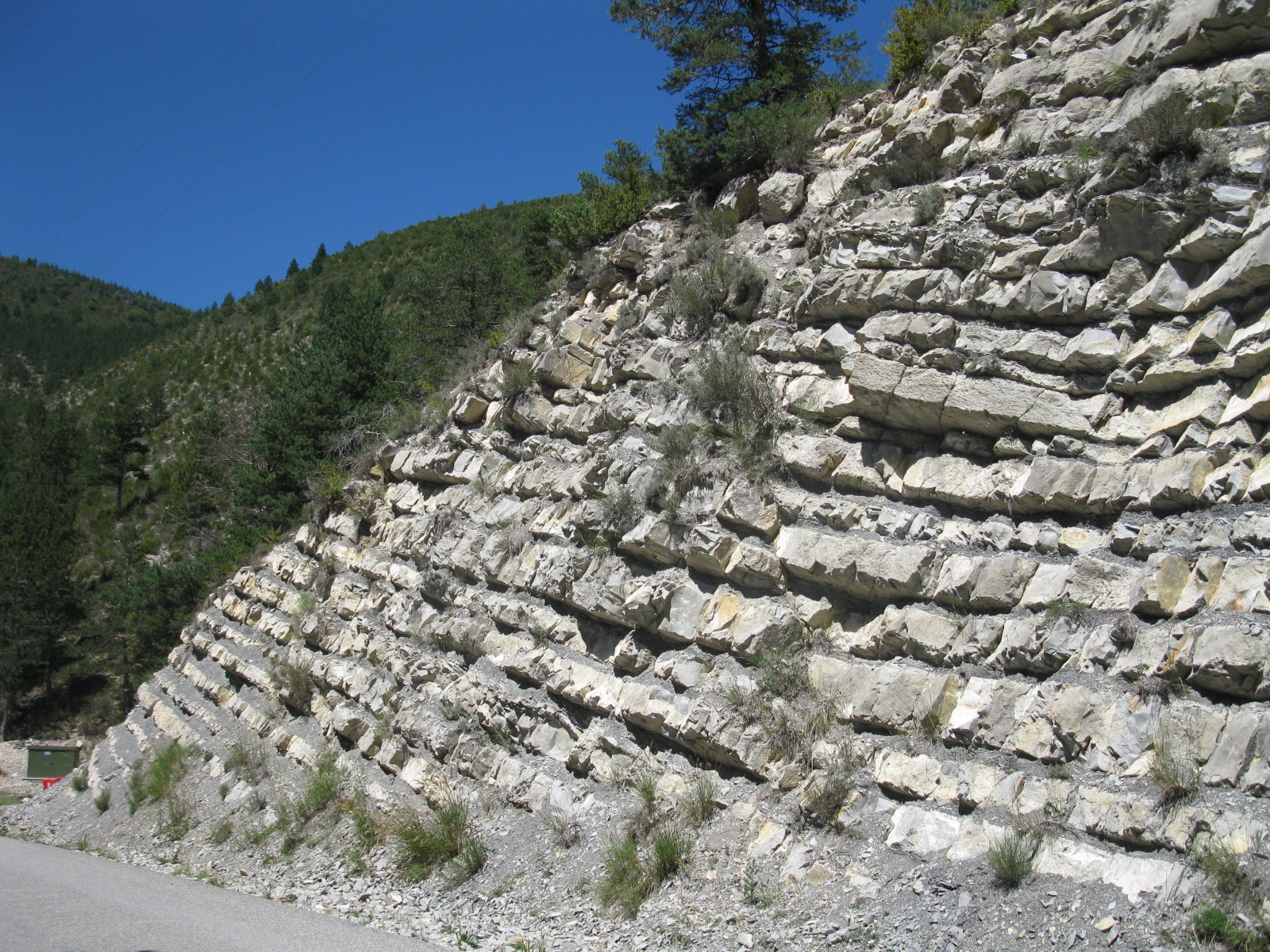
- Barremian sedimentary rock layers, France

Chronology
← / K-Pg mass extinction
Subdivision of the Cretaceous according to the ICS, as of 2024. Vertical axis scale: Millions of years ago

Etymology
- Name formality: Formal

Usage information
- Celestial body: Earth
- Regional usage: Global (ICS)
- Time scale(s) used: ICS Time Scale

Definition
- Chronological unit: Age
- Stratigraphic unit: Stage
- Time span formality: Formal
- Lower boundary definition: Not formally defined
- Lower boundary definition candidates: FAD of the Spitidiscus hugii-Spitidiscus vandeckii Ammonite group
- Lower boundary GSSP candidate section(s): Río Argos, Caravaca de la Cruz, Murcia Province, Spain
- Upper boundary definition: Not formally defined
- Upper boundary definition candidates: Base of magnetic polarity chronozone M0r.; Near FAD of the Ammonite Paradeshayesites oglanlensis
- Upper boundary GSSP candidate section(s): Gorgo a Cerbara, Piobbico, Central Apennines, Italy

The Barremian is an age in the geologic timescale (or a chronostratigraphic stage) between 125.77 Ma (million years ago) and 121.4 ± 0.6 Ma (Historically, this stage was placed at 129.4 million to approximately 125 million years ago). It is a subdivision of the Early Cretaceous Epoch (or Lower Cretaceous Series). It is preceded by the Hauterivian and followed by the Aptian Stage.

== Stratigraphic definitions ==
The original type locality for the Barremian Stage is in the vicinity of the village of Barrême, Alpes-de-Haute-Provence, France. Henri Coquand defined the stage and named it in 1873.

The base of the Barremian is determined by the first appearance of the ammonites Spitidiscus hugii and Spitidiscus vandeckii. The end of the Barremian is determined by the geomagnetic reversal at the start of the M0r chronozone, which is biologically near the first appearance of the ammonite Paradeshayesites oglanlensis.

== Fossiliferous formations ==
Examples of geologic formations formed during the Barremian that preserve fossils are: Yixian Formation, La Huérguina Formation, Cedar Mountain Formation, Cloverly Formation, Elrhaz Formation, Jiufotang Formation, and Wessex Formation.

=== Regional equivalents ===
The Barremian falls in the Gallic epoch, a subdivision of the Cretaceous that is no longer used by the ICS. It overlaps the lower part of the Urgonian stage, which is sometimes used in western European stratigraphy. In North America, the late Coahulian and the early Comanchean correspond to the Barremian. In New Zealand, it falls within the Mokoiwian, and in Japan it corresponds to the late Aritan.

=== Subdivision ===
The Barremian is often subdivided into two substages or subages, Lower/Early and Upper/Late Barremian.

In the Tethys domain, the Barremian stage contains eleven ammonite biozones:

- zone of Pseudocrioceras waagenoides
- zone of Colchidites sarasini
- zone of Imerites giraudi
- zone of Hemihoplites feraudianus
- zone of Gerhardtia sertousi
- zone of Ancyloceras vandenheckii
- zone of Coronites darsi
- zone of Kotetishvilia compressissima
- zone of Nicklesia pulchella
- zone of Nicklesia nicklesi
- zone of Spitidiscus hugii
