= Hans Gottfried Kugler =

Swiss geologist

Hans Gottfried Kugler (22 August 1893 – 6 December 1986) was a Swiss geologist who worked in Trinidad. He worked primarily on stratigraphy and worked in the petrochemical industry but continued to take an interest in micropaleontology. He established at laboratory at Pointe-a-Pierre and produced a 1:100000 map of the geology of Trinidad in 1961. He collected specimens extensively for the Basel Natural History Museum. Nearly 60 taxa are named in his honour.

Kugler was born in Baden, Argau and grew up in St. Gallen and Basel where he went to the Untern Realschule. Interested in natural history from an early age he began to collect fossils in the Jura mountains. He spent his spare time in the Basel Natural History Museum and studied geology under Karl Schmidt (1862-1923), August Buxtorf and Heinrich Preiswerk (1876-1940) at the University of Basel before working on the collections of August Tobler. He joined Tobler into Trinidad in 1913 where he established plankton micropaleontology studies. In 1914 he returned and received a doctorate in 1920. He helped identify an anticline during oil surveys in Trinidad in 1921 for Apex Oil Company and in 1925 he worked for the Trinidad Petroleum Development Company. He then worked in Venezuela to head an exploration team in Falcon State. Their careful surface mapping, with resultant understanding of the subsurface structure, led to the development of the Cumarebo Field, which was later operated by Standard. He examined Conrad Schlumberger's resistivity studies for Trinidad in 1928 and adopted it as routing oil-well survey practice with Trinidad Leaseholds Limited (later taken over by Texaco) where he was chief geologist. He moved back with his wife Aline and daughter to Switzerland in 1959 and began to work in the Basel museum. He continued to be a consultant and made several visits to Trinidad.

== Legacy ==
Kugler is commemorated in the scientific name of a species of Venezuelan lizard, Alopoglossus kugleri.
