= Sicilian Stage =

The Sicilian European Stage is a European faunal stage in the Pleistocene of the Geologic time scale. While earlier defined as between 0.781 ± 0.005 Ma and 0.26 Ma (million years ago), in the middle of the Pleistocene epoch, more accurate data places it at the end of the early Pleistocene, ending at 0.781 ± 0.005 Ma, and makes it a sub-stage.

The Sicilian Stage was originally proposed by Doderlein, in 1872, and thought to occur after the end of the Calabrian. The Milazzian faunal stage is sometimes considered to be the last part of the Sicilian, and sometimes to be after it.

In 1991, Rio et al. proposed placing the Sicilian as a sub-stage below (before) the Brunhes–Matuyama magnetic reversal, as part of a newly defined Selinuntian Stage which would be divided into the Santernian, Emilian, and Sicilian sub-stages, completely replacing the Calabrian. Although the problems with the Calabrian pointed out by Rio were acknowledged, the name "Calabrian" was not rejected; however, the Sicilian was recognized by some as the third sub-stage of the Calabrian., and continues to be used.

== Representative Fauna ==
- Tursiops osennae (Simonelli, 1911), a porpoise

== Notes ==
Preceded by Calabrian Stage; 1.806 – 0.781	European Faunal Stage; Sicilian Stage; 0.781 – 0.26	Succeeded by Tyrrhenian Stage; 0.26 – 0.01143
