= August Tobler =

Swiss geologist (1872–1929)

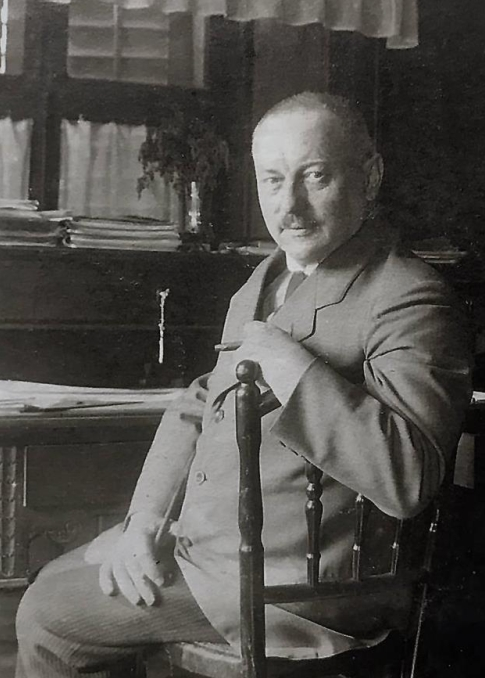
Tobler in Basel, c. 1918

August Tobler (29 April 1872 – 23 November 1929) was a Swiss geologist who worked extensively in Sumatra while working for Dutch oil companies examining the geology of the region using micropaleontology of sediments.

== Education ==
Tobler was born in Basel where his father was a high school teacher. Educated at the University of Basel, he was influenced by Carl Schmidt (1862–1923) and went to study under Karl von Zittel at Munich and with August Rothpletz. Tobler then worked as an assistant to Schmidt in Basel, travelling to the US and Russia before writing his habilitation and becoming a lecturer at the University of Basel from 1899.

== Career ==
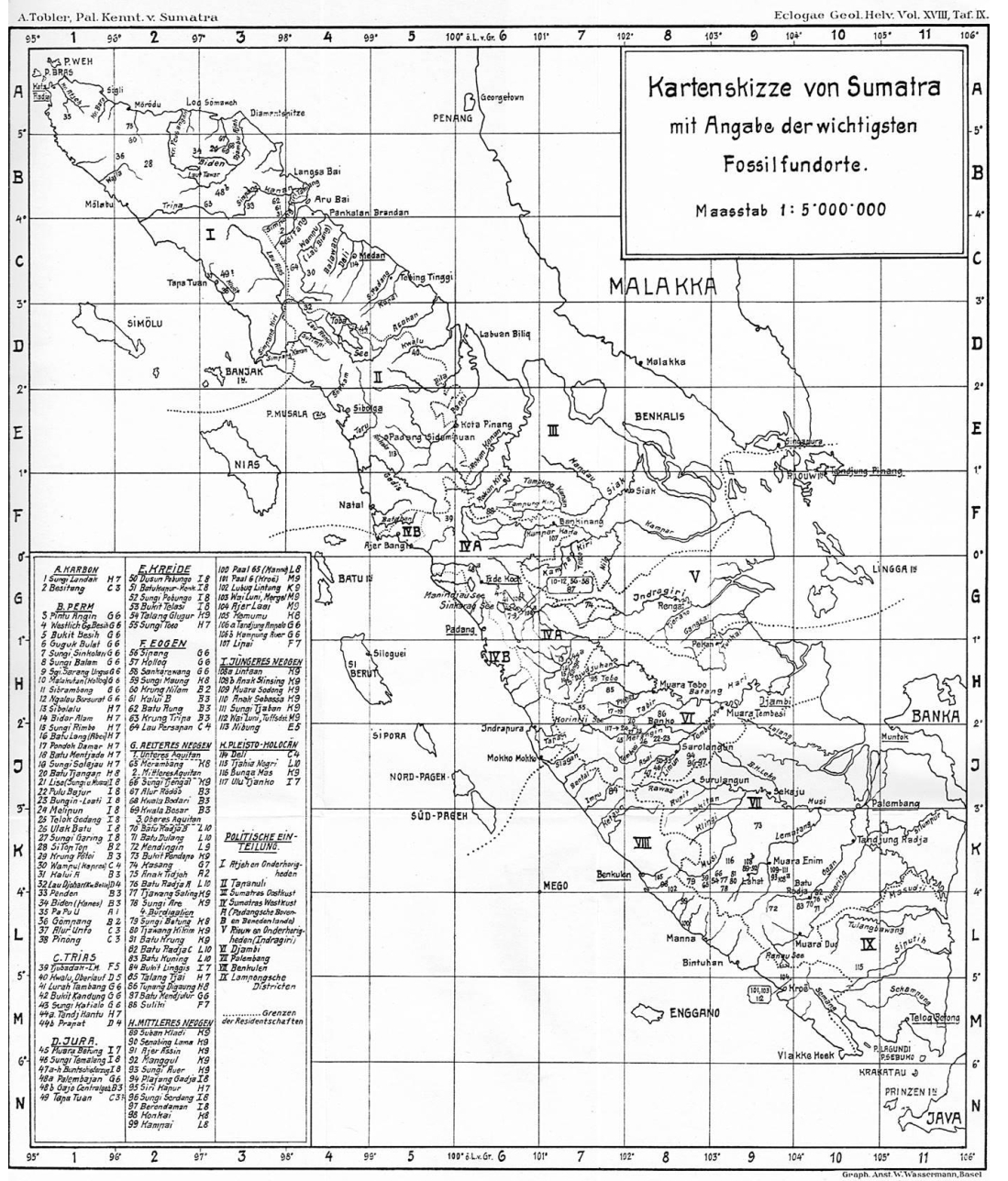
Fossil sites in Sumatra

From 1900 to 1903, he worked for the Royal Dutch Shell oil company in South Sumatra. The next two years were with the Muara Enim company and here he was allowed to publish his geology findings. His work led to coal mining in Bukit Asam. On his return route, he travelled along Burma and the Himalayas with August Buxtorf. In 1906 he was hired by the Dutch bureau of mines and returned to Southeast Asia and worked mainly in Jambi during the early years. He trained an Indonesian assistant, Abdul Kuder Mas Bakal, to help him in his work. Tobler returned to Basel in 1912 and retired but continued to work without pay at the Natural History Museum of Basel, which was located close to his home.

His assistant Bakal and family moved to Basel in 1915 and lived along with him, and Bakal continued to work as a specimen preparator and as Tobler's personal assistant, returning to Indonesia only after Tobler's death. Tobler briefly worked on mapping in Trinidad in 1913. Tobler also served as a supervisor for several students of geology at the University of Basel. His student Hans G. Kugler moved to Trinidad where he established plankton micropaleontology studies. Other students included I.M. van der Vlerk.

Tobler trained several assistant in micropaleontology, served as editor of the journal Eclogae Geologicae Helvetica from 1920 to 1927 and was a founder member of the Schweizerische Paläontologische Gesellschaft (Swiss Paleontological Society) serving as its president from 1926 to 1928.

Tobler died from heart attack while on a geological outing to the Jurassic outcrops of Huttingen in Germany. His specimens in the Basel museum continue to be studied.
