= Tyrrhenian (stage) =

The Tyrrhenian Stage is the last faunal stage of the Pleistocene in Italy. It runs from 0.26 million (260,000) to 0.01143 million (11,430) years ago. It overlaps with the end of the Middle Pleistocene and all of the Late Pleistocene. The time period of the Tyrrhenian Stage is the same as that of the Senegalese fauna assemblage.

== Definition ==
The end of the Tyrrhenian is defined as exactly 10,000 Carbon-14 years before the present (0.01143 +/- 0.00013 mya), which is near to the end of the Younger Dryas cold spell.

== History of the definition ==
The Tyrrhenian Stage was first defined in 1914 by Arturo Issel to describe the stratigraphic section containing Strombus fossils originally investigated by Gignoux. Strombus bubonius was the leading fossil.

== See also ==
- Etruscan civilization
