= Alopoglossus kugleri =

Conservation status
- Least Concern (IUCN 3.1)

Scientific classification
- Kingdom: Animalia
- Phylum: Chordata
- Class: Reptilia
- Order: Squamata
- Family: Alopoglossidae
- Genus: Alopoglossus
- Species: A. kugleri

Binomial name
- Alopoglossus kugleri (Roux, 1927)

Synonyms
- Ptychoglossus kugleri Roux, 1927

Species of lizard

Alopoglossus kugleri, also known commonly as Kugler's largescale lizard, is a species of lizard in the family Alopoglossidae. The species is endemic to Venezuela.

== Etymology ==
The specific name, kugleri, is in honor of Swiss geologist Hans Gottfried Kugler.

== Description ==
Dorsally, A. kugleri is black. Ventrally, it is brick red.

== Geographic range ==
A. kugleri is found in northwestern Venezuela, in the states of Aragua, Carabobo, and Falcón.

== Habitat ==
The preferred natural habitat of A. kugleri is forest, at altitudes from sea level to 500 m (1,600 ft).
