= Phytic era =

Era of plant evolution

The phytic eras divide the history of life based on the evolution of plants. The "-phytic" eras differ from the animal based "-zoic" eras, although they use the same prefixes. Phytic eras are defined by palynomorphs (organisms made out of sporopollenin) which include pollen, spores, and acritarcs in the rock record.

== Archeophytic ==
The Archeophytic begins with the first known microfossils, which are prokaryotic bacteria, about 3.5 Ga (billion years ago) and ends with the appearance of the acritarcs at 1.2 Ga, which are assumed to be eukaryotic. Acritarcs are not necessarily photosynthetic—their biology and ecology remain shrouded in mystery—but their cell walls are built of sporopollenin. The Archeophytic can therefore be thought of as the time before sporopollenin existed.

== Proterophytic ==
The Proterophytic is the era of the enigmatic acritarcs. The morphology of acritarchs is very diverse. Many have long appendages of unknown usage. Multiple naming categories for acritarcs have been suggested, but relationships between acrictarcs remain unknown. The Proterophytic is also called the Eophytic.

== Paleophytic ==
The Paleophytic begins in the late Ordovician Period with the rise of the vascular plants and continues until the Kingurian (Middle Permian), when advanced gymnosperms took over the Earth's floral niches. Unlike animals, land plants experienced no major extinctions at the end of the Permian. Rather, the land plant extinction seems to have preceded the P-T event. At the end of the Paleophytic, plants that dominated throughout the era such as Cordaites, Calamites, and Lepidodendron disappeared and were replaced by conifers and glossopterids.

== Mesophytic ==
Conifers, cycadophytes, and other advanced gymnosperms dominate the Mesophytic. In the early Mesophytic, striate, taeniate, and polyplicate pollen forms were common, but were later replaced by simple, psilate gymnosperm pollen grains.

== Cenophytic ==
The Cenophytic begins well before the Cenozoic. The Cenophytic is used most often by palynologists and paleobotanists to describe the time marked by the arrival of angiosperms in the late Jurassic Period and continuing until today.

The beginning of the Cenophytic is evidenced by fossilized angiosperm fruiting axes and fossil flies with angiosperm-adapted mouth parts from the Late Jurassic of China.
