= Paleophytic =

The Paleophytic is an era of time preceding the Mesophytic and the Cenophytic and succeeding the Proterophytic. The phytic eras are based on the evolution of plants, and differ from the "-zoic" eras, which are based on animal life. The Paleophytic begins in the late Ordovician Period with the rise of the vascular plants and continues until the Kungurian, when advanced gymnosperms took over the Earth's floral niches.
