= Friedrich August von Alberti =

German geologist (1795–1878)

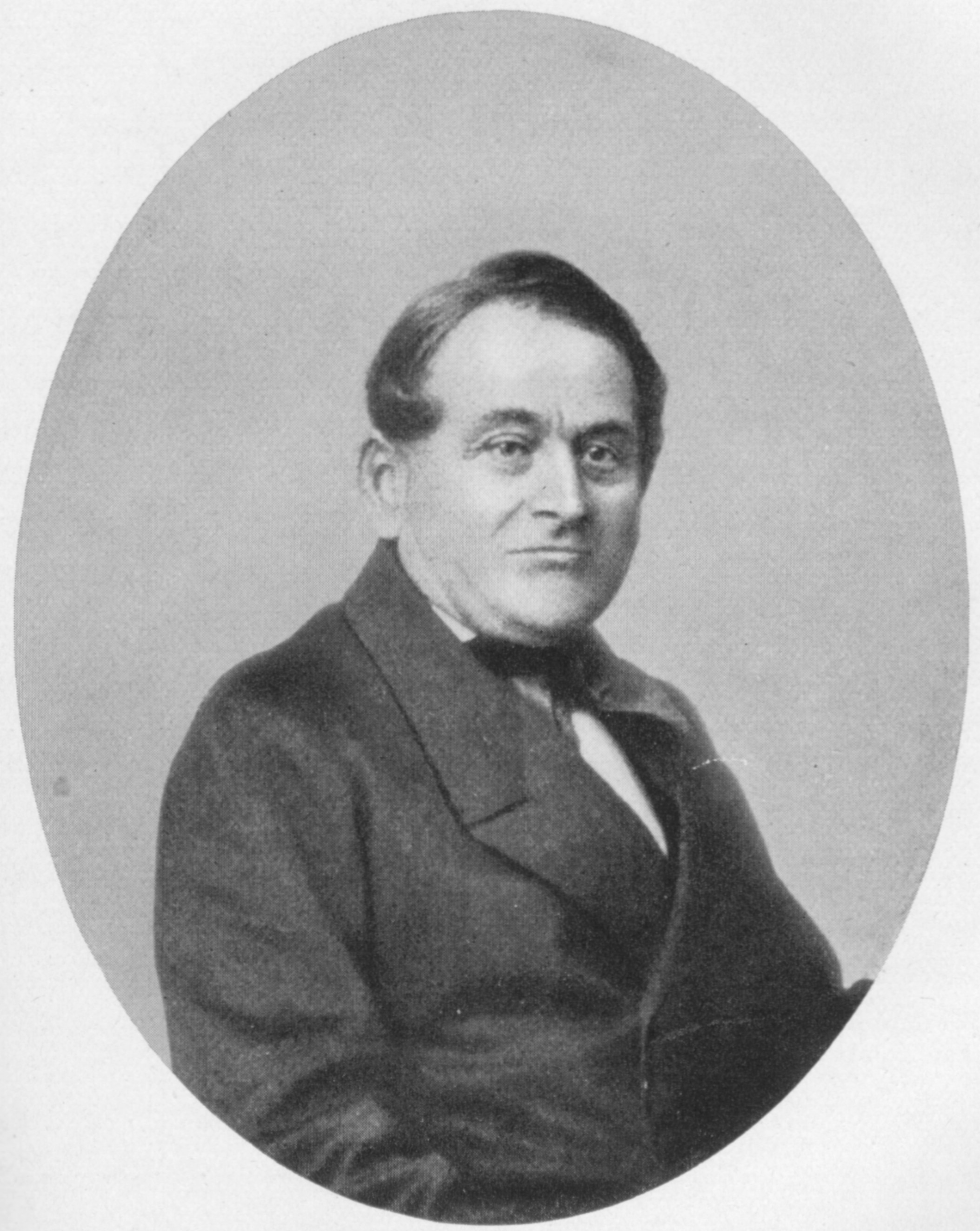
Friedrich von Alberti

Friedrich August von Alberti (September 4, 1795 – September 12, 1878) was a German geologist whose ground-breaking 1834 publication recognized the unity of the three characteristic strata that compose the sedimentary deposits of the Triassic period in Northern Europe. From the fossils contained in the three distinct layers— of red bed sandstones, capped by limestones (Muschelkalk), followed by black shales— that are found throughout Germany and Northwest Europe, and are called the 'Trias' (Latin trias meaning triad), Alberti detected that they formed a single stratigraphic formation; today it would be termed a system. He identified the Triassic as bearing a unique fossil fauna, bounded by the Permian extinction below and by another extinction above.

Alberti grew up in Stuttgart and Rottweil where he was educated at the Gymnasium and went to the military school in Stuttgart. Afterwards he went back to Rottweil, a town 100 km (62 mi) south of Stuttgart. He learned the salt processing system and became a Salinentechniker (salt technician). He was quickly promoted to Salineninspektor (salt supervisor). In 1823, based on his perception of the area's geology, he had an idea to drill for salt in Rottenmünster. Eight months later the team had success and found salt, in a location where no one would have considered the possibility of finding salt.

He also made excavations in the Roman ruins of Rottweil, the ancient Arae Flaviae; he published his findings from 1833 to 1837.

Alberti bought a house and lived in Rottenmünster, a former abbey 2 miles from Rottweil, from 1829 to 1853. While there he worked as manager for two salt companies. After he retired he moved to Heilbronn. He took a position as advisor, salt technician, and geologist. He had excellent skills in understanding sandstone and limestone. He discovered that if you find combinations of these two kinds of stone together, you will always find salt. He wrote books on his experiences of looking and drilling for salt.

He invented the method of mining salt by pumping water into the mine; when the brine rose to the surface, he would allow the water to evaporate and then he would collect the salt.

The Eberhard Karls University of Tübingen gave Friedrich August von Alberti an honorary doctorate for his achievements in the salt-mining industry. The city honored him with a street in his name.

Alberti was very well thought of and popular. People liked him for his personality, his happiness, and the fact that he was very open and honest to everyone. After he died his family stayed in Rottweil, where also a street bears his name. Today many of his descendants still live in the town.

In Bad Friedrichshall, also a former salt town, a school is named after him, the Friedrich-von-Alberti-Gymnasium.
