= Richard Gilbert West =

British botanist (1926–2020)

Richard Gilbert West FRS
- Education: Clare College
- Scientific career
- Fields: botany; geology; palaeontology

Richard Gilbert West FRS (31 May 1926 – 30 December 2020) was a British botanist, geologist and palaeontologist.

== Career ==
He began his career at the age of 18 in 1944 when he joined the Army and spent time in India. On return to England, he went to Clare College, Cambridge in 1948 taking Botany and Geology at Part I. Although being tempted to take Geology for Part II, he decided to study Botany, for which he obtained First Class Honours and the Frank Smart Studentship. As a research student, he was supervised by Harry Godwin, Director of the Subdepartment of Quaternary Research and investigated the now classic study of the stratigraphy and palynology of the Middle Pleistocene interglacial lake deposits at Hoxne, Suffolk. He was awarded his PhD in 1954, shortly after he was elected a Fellow of Clare College, Cambridge. Richard become a lecturer in the Department of Botany in 1960, in 1966 he became Director of the Subdepartment, and Professor of Botany in 1977. He was elected a Fellow of the Royal Society in 1968 and was awarded many medals and prizes, including the Lyell and Bigsby medals of the Geological Society and the Albrecht Penck medal of the Deutsche Quartärvereiningung. He retired in 1991.

Throughout his career he has maintained a wide interest in Quaternary Science in general, and the British Quaternary geology in particular. His research has been mainly based on the understanding of interglacial and cold-climate period palaeobotany and stratigraphy, but also sedimentation and periglaciation. As well as inspiring three generations of research students, he published numerous reviews, over 120 papers and 9 books.
