= Albert de Lapparent =

French geologist

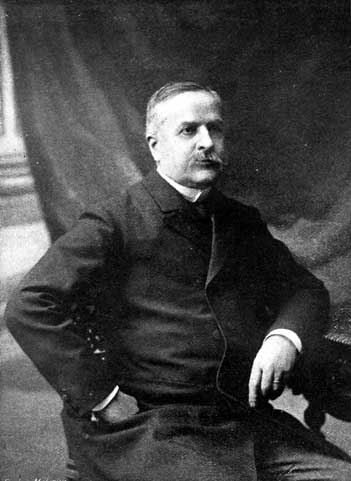
Albert-Auguste de Lapparent

Albert Auguste Cochon de Lapparent (30 December 1839 – 5 May 1908) was a French geologist.

== Life ==
He was born at Bourges. After studying at the École polytechnique from 1858 to 1860 he became ingénieur au corps des mines, and took part in drawing up the geological map of France; and in 1875 he was appointed professor of geology and mineralogy at the Catholic Institute in Paris. In 1879 he prepared an important memoir for the geological survey of France on the Pays de Bray, a subject on which he had already published several memoirs, and in 1880 he served as president of the Société Géologique de France. In 1881-1883 he published his Traité de géologie, a well-regarded textbook of stratigraphy.

His other works include Cours de minéralogie (1884), La formation des combustibles minéraux (1886), Le niveau de la mer et ses variations (1886), Les tremblements de terre (1887), La géologie en chemin de fer (1888), Précis de minéralogie (1888), Le siècle du fer (1890), Les anciens glaciers (1893), Leçons de géographie physique (1896), Notions générales sur l'écorce terrestre (1897), Le globe terrestre (1899), and Science et apologétique (1905).

With Achille Delesse he was for many years editor of the Revue de géologie and contributed to the Extraits de géologie, and he joined with Alfred Potier in the geological surveys undertaken in connection with the Channel Tunnel proposals.

He died in Paris in 1908.
