= Paradeshayesites =

Paradeshayesites Temporal range: Aptian

Scientific classification
- Kingdom: Animalia
- Phylum: Mollusca
- Class: Cephalopoda
- Subclass: †Ammonoidea
- Order: †Ammonitida
- Suborder: †Ancyloceratina
- Family: †Deshayesitidae
- Genus: †Paradeshayesites; Kemper, 1967

Genus of molluscs (fossil)

Paradeshayesites is an extinct genus of cephalopod belonging to the ammonite subclass.

== Biostratigraphic significance ==
The International Commission on Stratigraphy (ICS) has assigned the First Appearance Datum of Paradeshayesites oglanlensis as the defining biological marker for the start of the Aptian Stage of the Cretaceous, ~125.0 million years ago.
