= Isaäk Martinus van der Vlerk =

Isaäk Martinus van der Vlerk (31 January 1892 – 29 June 1974) was a Dutch paleontologist and geologist who worked in Dutch Indonesia where he was involved in stratigraphic studies based on foraminifera. He applied morphometric studies, examining curvature in foraminifera as a criterion, for determining geological ages of strata.

== Biography ==
Van der Vlerk was born in Utrecht, and moved to Groningen in 1914 where he studied geology under J.H. Bonnema. After his bachelor's degree he moved to study geology at the University of Basel influenced by August Tobler he started examining fossil foraminifera for dating. His 1922 PhD was under Karl Martin and examined the stratigraphy of Sumbawa in the Dutch East Indies. He then worked with the mining service, working on mapping in Java and Sumatra. He was responsible for the so-called Indonesian letter classification. From 1924 he worked at the Bandung Museum with J.H.F. Umbgrove. Returning to the Netherlands in 1928 he became a curator at the National Museum of Natural History in Leiden while also teaching at the University of Leiden (becoming a professor in 1947). Van der Vlerk introduced morphometric approaches to examining correlations in grade of enclosure and curvature across taxa over time. He discovered a Pleistocene human skull at Hengelo which led to studies on the Dutch Pleistocene along with Frans Florschütz on the stratigraphy and paleontology of the Dutch Pleistocene.

Van der Vlerk was a member of the Royal Netherlands Academy of Arts and Sciences from 1950 onwards.
