= André Dumont (geologist) =

Belgian geologist (1809–1857)

André Hubert Dumont
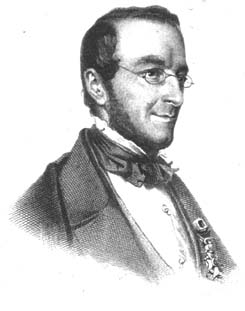
- Born: André Hubert Dumont; 15 February 1809; Liège, Belgium, Kingdom of the Netherlands
- Died: 28 February 1857 (aged 48); Liège, Belgium

André Hubert Dumont (15 February 1809 – 28 February 1857) was a Belgian geologist.

Dumont was born in Liège, Belgium. His first work was a masterly Mémoire on the geology of the province of Liège published in 1832. A few years later he became a professor of mineralogy and geology and afterwards Rector of the University of Liège. He subsequently turned his attention to the mineralogical and stratigraphical description of the geological formations in Belgium. The names given by him to many subdivisions of the Cretaceous and Tertiary have been adopted.

His Mémoire sur les terrains ardennais et rhénan de l'Ardenne, du Brabant et du Condroz (1847–1848) is notable for the care with which the mineralogy of the strata was described, but the palaeontological characterization was insufficient, and neither did he adopt the terms Silurian or Devonian.

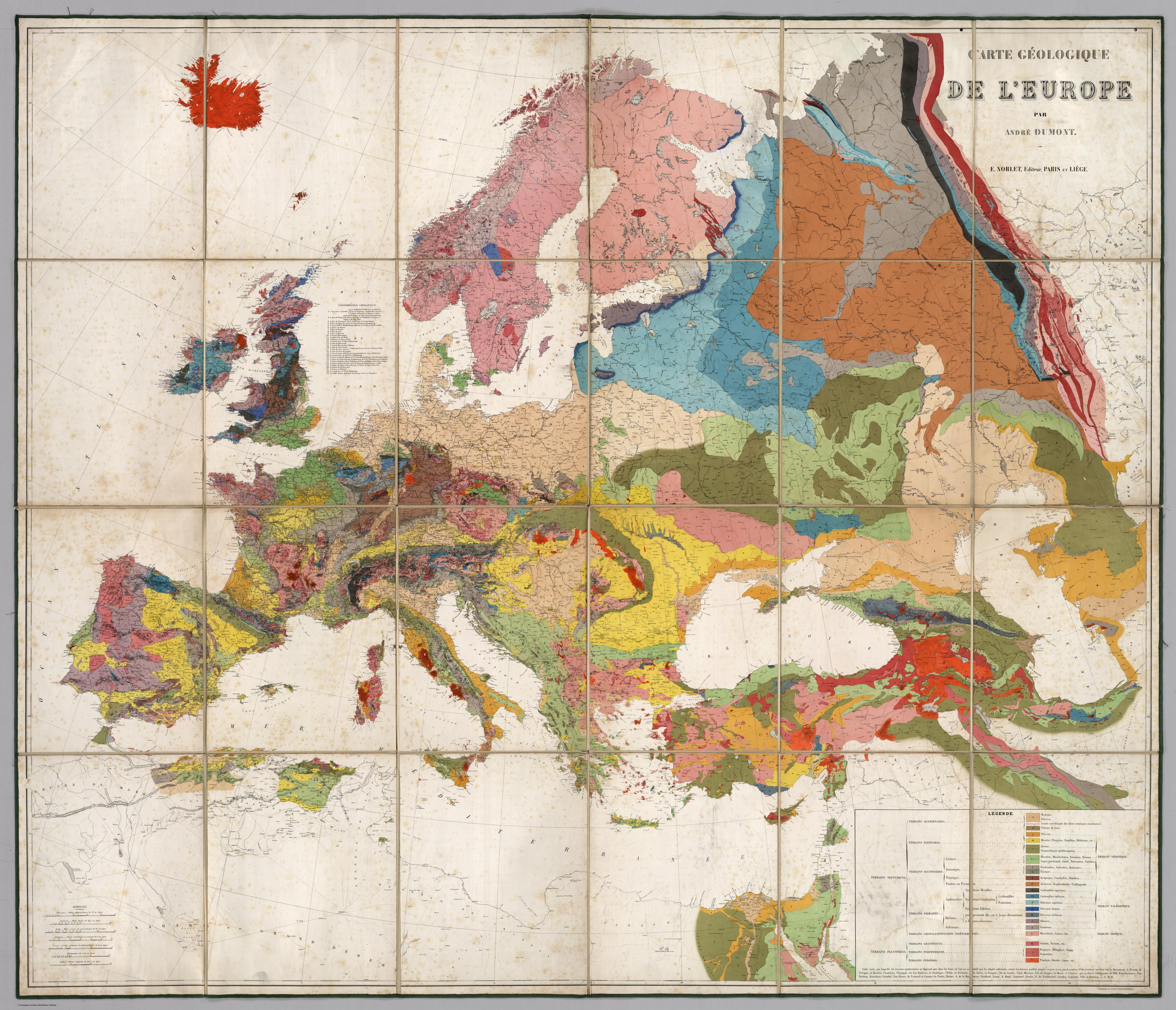
1875 Dumont's geological map of Europe

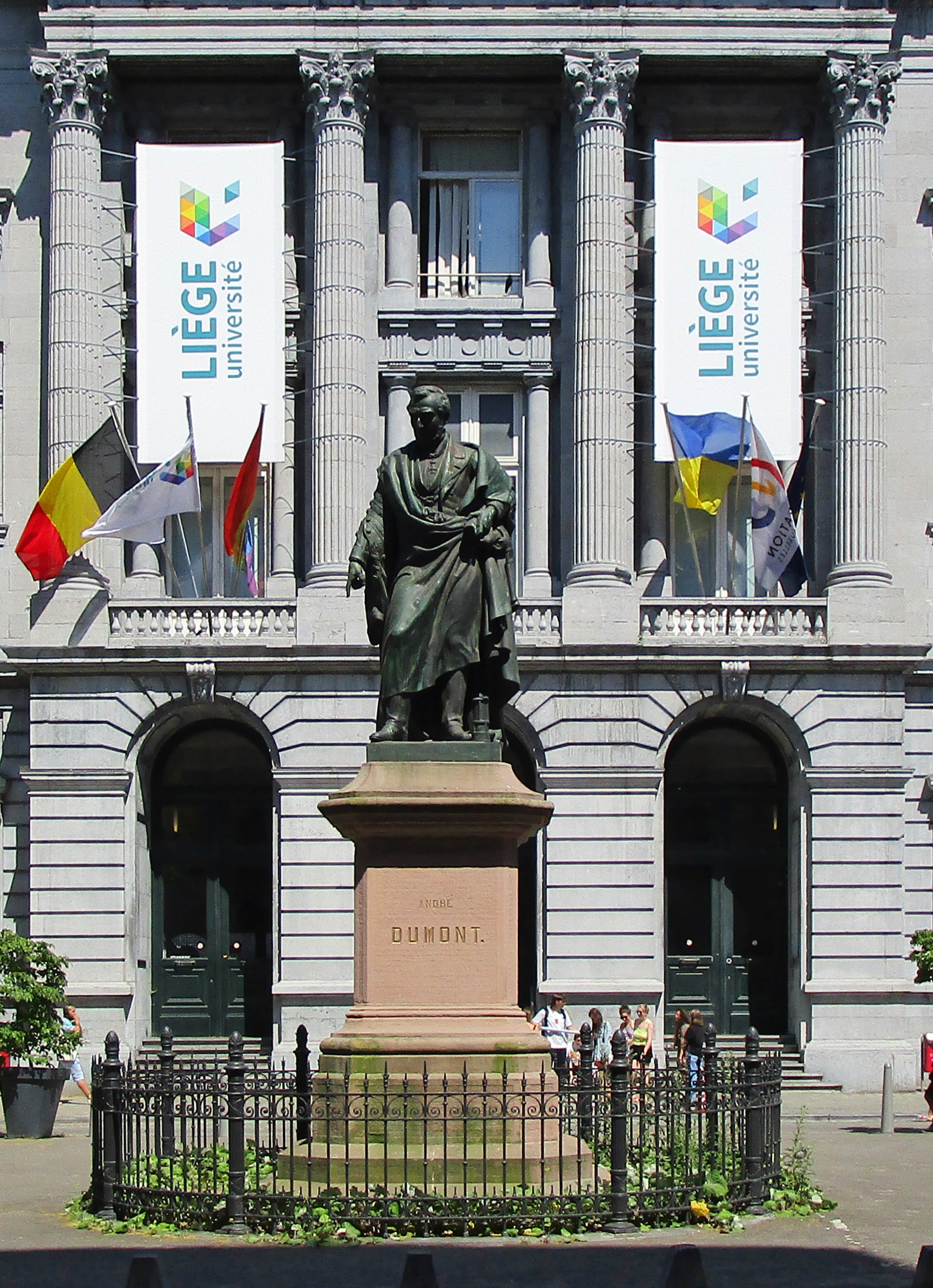
Statue of André Dumont in Liège

During twenty years he laboured on a geological map of Belgium (1849). He spared no pains to make his work as complete as possible, examining—on foot—almost every area of importance in the country. Journeying to the more southern parts of Europe, he investigated the shores of the Bosphorus, the mountains of Spain and other regions, thereby collecting material for his geological map of Europe. This latter work of outstanding scholarship was one of the first serious attempts to establish the regional-scale geological correlation between the various countries of Europe. After his death, his geological map was updated by Gustave Dewalque, the successor to his professorial chair.

The Geological Society of London awarded Dumont in 1840 the Wollaston medal. He died in Liège.

His son, also André Dumont (1847–1920), discovered coal in the Campine basin on 1 August 1901.
