= Aptian =

Fifth age of the Early Cretaceous

- 121.4 ± 0.6 – 113.2 ± 0.3 Ma

Chronology
← / K-Pg mass extinction
Subdivision of the Cretaceous according to the ICS, as of 2024. Vertical axis scale: Millions of years ago

Etymology
- Name formality: Formal

Usage information
- Celestial body: Earth
- Regional usage: Global (ICS)
- Time scale(s) used: ICS Time Scale

Definition
- Chronological unit: Age
- Stratigraphic unit: Stage
- Time span formality: Formal
- Lower boundary definition: Not formally defined
- Lower boundary definition candidates: Base of magnetic polarity chronozone M0r.; Near FAD of the Ammonite Paradeshayesites oglanlensis
- Lower boundary GSSP candidate section(s): Gorgo a Cerbara, Piobbico, Central Apennines, Italy
- Upper boundary definition: FAD of the Planktonic Foraminifer Microhedbergella renilaevis
- Upper boundary GSSP: Col de Pré-Guittard section, Arnayon, Drôme, France; 44.5079°N 5.2973°E
- Upper GSSP ratified: April 2016

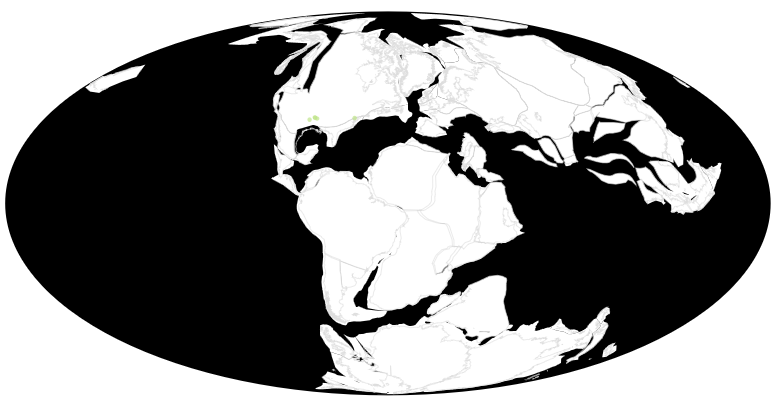
Palaeogeography of the Earth in Aptian.

The Aptian is an age in the geologic timescale or a stage in the stratigraphic column. It is a subdivision of the Early or Lower Cretaceous Epoch or Series and encompasses the time from 121.4 ± 0.6 Ma to 113.2 ± 0.3 Ma (million years ago), approximately. The Aptian succeeds the Barremian and precedes the Albian, all part of the Lower/Early Cretaceous.

The Aptian partly overlaps the upper part of the Western European Urgonian Stage.

The Selli Event, also known as OAE1a, was one of two oceanic anoxic events in the Cretaceous Period, which occurred around 120 Ma and lasted approximately 1 to 1.3 million years, being marked by enhanced silicate weathering, as well as ocean acidification. The Aptian extinction was a minor extinction event hypothesized to have occurred around 116 to 117 Ma.

== Stratigraphic definitions ==
The Aptian was named after the small city of Apt in the Provence region of France, which is also known for its crystallized fruits. The original type locality is in the vicinity of Apt. The Aptian was introduced in scientific literature by French palaeontologist Alcide d'Orbigny in 1840.

The base of the Aptian Stage is laid at magnetic anomaly M0r. A global reference profile for the base (a GSSP) had in 2009 not yet been appointed. The top of the Aptian (the base of the Albian) is at the first appearance of coccolithophore species Praediscosphaera columnata in the stratigraphic record.

=== Subdivision ===
In the Tethys domain, the Aptian contains eight ammonite biozones:

- zone of Hypacanthoplites jacobi
- zone of Nolaniceras nolani
- zone of Parahoplites melchioris
- zone of Epicheloniceras subnodosocostatum
- zone of Dufrenoyia furcata
- zone of Deshayesites deshayesi
- zone of Deshayesites weissi
- zone of Deshayesites oglanlensis

Sometimes the Aptian is subdivided in three substages or subages: Bedoulian (early or lower), Gargasian (middle) and Clansayesian (late or upper). In modern formal chronostratigraphy the Aptian is divided into Lower and Upper sub-stages. The Lower Aptian is almost equivalent to the Bedoulian (without the Dufrenoyia furcata Zone), and it includes the 3 "Deshayesites" ammonite zones. The Upper Aptian spans the Gargasian and Clansayesian intervals, it includes the furcata to jacobi Tethys ammonite zones (Moullade et al. 2011).

== Lithostratigraphic units ==
Examples of rock units formed during the Aptian are: Antlers Formation, Cedar Mountain Formation, Cloverly Formation, Elrhaz Formation, Jiufotang Formation, Little Atherfield, Mazong Shan, Potomac Formation, Santana Formation, Twin Mountains Formation and Xinminbao Group

== Climate ==
A cold episode occurred at the start of the Aptian, as evidenced by the migration of the dinoflagellates Cepadinium variabilis and Pseudoceratium nohrhansenii into lower latitudes. A decline in global pCO_{2} occurred from about 1,000 ppm to 800 ppm from the start of the Aptian to the C10 positive carbon isotope excursion. During the late Aptian, pCO_{2} was between 515 ± 79 and 1029.8 ± 158 ppm as evidenced by the stomatal density of Pseudofrenelopsis capillata.

== See also ==
- Aptian extinction
