= William Sawney Bisat =

Bisat in 1955.

William Sawney Bisat, FRS (1886–1973) was a civil engineer in the north of England whose principal recreation was geological research. He is remembered for his work on goniatites which contributed to the refinement of the stratigraphy of the Carboniferous period, not least in northern England.

Bisat was born in Doncaster, West Riding of Yorkshire on 19 October 1886 to Charles Edward and Margaret Bisat. He was elected as a fellow of the Royal Society in 1947. Amongst positions he held were president of Hull Geological Society (1927–28), of Leeds Geological Association (1934–35) and of the Yorkshire Naturalists' Union (1935). He was elected president of the Yorkshire Geological Society for the period 1938–40 and later won the 1961 Sorby Medal from that society. He was presented with the Lyell Medal by the Geological Society in 1942.

Bisat died on 14 May 1973 at Collingham near Leeds. One genus (Bisatoceras - now a sub-family) and several species of goniatite have been named in his honour including Gigantoproductus bisati, Cravenoceratoides bisati, Goniatites bisati and Chaenocarciola bisati.

== Selected publications ==
- Bisat, W. S. (1914). "The Millstone Grit Sequence Between Masham and Great Whernside". Proceedings of the Yorkshire Geological Society. 19 (1): 20–24. Bibcode:1914PYGS...19...20B. doi:10.1144/pygs.19.1.20.
- "The Millstone Grits W. of Huddersfield—II. by W. S. Bisat". The Naturalist: A Monthly Journal of Natural History for the North of England. 1921. pp. 9–11.
- Bisat, W. S. (1923). "The Carboniferous Goniatites of the North of England and Their Zones". Proceedings of the Yorkshire Geological Society. 20 (1): 40–124. Bibcode:1923PYGS...20...40B. doi:10.1144/pygs.20.1.40.
- Fearnsides, W.G.; Bisat, W.S.; Edwards, Wilfrid; Lewis, H.P.; Wilcockson, W.H. (1932). "The geology of the Eastern part of the Peak district". Proceedings of the Geologists' Association. 43 (2): 152–191. Bibcode:1932PrGA...43..152F. doi:10.1016/S0016-7878(32)80026-X.
- Bisat, W.S. (1933). "II. The phylogeny of the North of England goniatites". Proceedings of the Geologists' Association. 44 (3): 255–260. Bibcode:1933PrGA...44..255B. doi:10.1016/S0016-7878(33)80002-2.
- Bisat, W.S. (1933). "The Carboniferous goniatites of the neighbourhood of Tenby". Proceedings of the Geologists' Association. 44 (4): 412–414. Bibcode:1933PrGA...44..412B. doi:10.1016/S0016-7878(33)80042-3.
- Bisat, W. S. (1934). "The Goniatites of the Beyrichoceras Zone in the North of England". Proceedings of the Yorkshire Geological Society. 22 (4): 280–309. Bibcode:1934PYGS...22..280B. doi:10.1144/pygs.22.4.280.
- Bisat, W. S. (1939). "Older and Newer Drift in East Yorkshire". Proceedings of the Yorkshire Geological Society. 24 (3): 137–151. Bibcode:1939PYGS...24..137B. doi:10.1144/pygs.24.3.137. (presidential address delivered in November 1939)
- Bisat, W. S.; Hudson, R. G. S. (1941). "The Lower Reticuloceras (R 1 ) Goniatite Succession in the Namurian of the North of England". Proceedings of the Yorkshire Geological Society. 24 (6): 383–440. Bibcode:1941PYGS...24..383B. doi:10.1144/pygs.24.6.383.
