= August Buxtorf =

Swiss geologist (1877–1969)

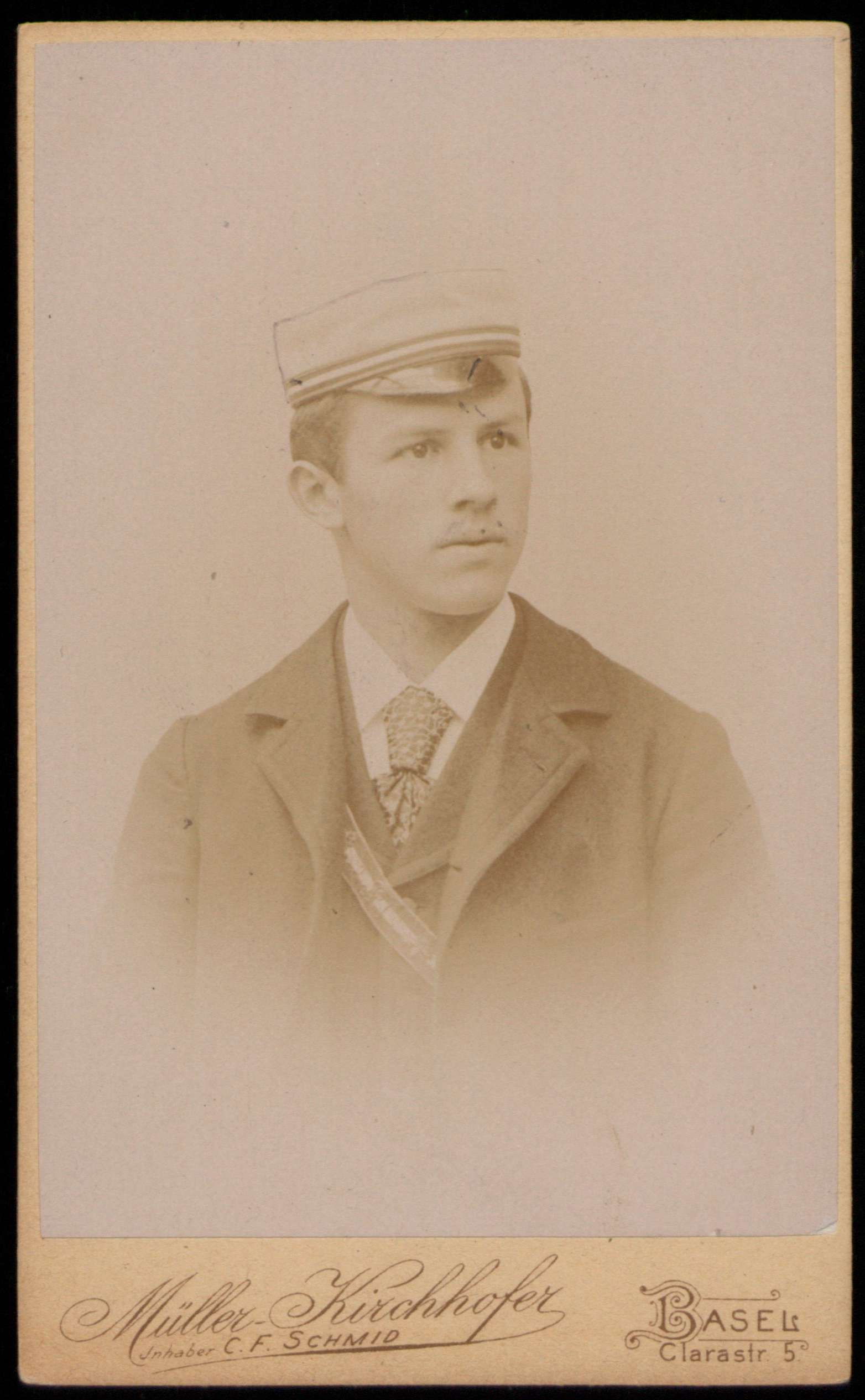
August Buxtorf (1898)

August Buxtorf (16 December 1877 – 2 March 1969) was a Swiss geologist. He worked at the University of Basel and contributed to ideas on nappes and mountain folds. His cross section of the Jura mountains to guide tunnel building in 1916 was widely used to understand buckling and folding.

Buxtorf was born in Basel to merchant Friedrich and Ernestine Rupp. He studied botany and geology at Basel and Grenoble before obtaining his doctorate in 1900 from the University of Göttingen with thesis on the geology of Gelterkinden. He worked as a petroleum geologist in Egypt, Burma and India. He began to examine disharmonious folding and returned to academics. In 1907 he completed his habilitation with Karl Schmidt and Heinrich Preiswerk and joined the University of Basel. He helped organize the institute of geology and paleontology in 1914 and trained numerous students until 1944. He became a rector of the university in 1940. He also presided over the Swiss Geological Commission, succeeding Albert Heim from 1926 to 1953. His studies on the folds and detachment of layers in the Jura and in sections of central Switzerland and Ticino contributed to the planning of several tunnels. He proposed a model of the Jura mountains as a “folded décollement nappe” pushed by the Alps in 1907. He then tried to refine his ideas when the Grenchenberg railroad tunnel was built. During his tenure the Swiss Geological Commission produced a detailed geological map of Switzerland at a scale of 1:25000.
