= Maurice Gignoux =

French geologist (1881–1955)

Maurice Irénée Marie Gignoux (19 October 1881 – 20 October 1955) was a renowned French geologist who was a specialist on the stratigraphy of the Alps. His 1925 book Geologie stratigraphique was a landmark publication in stratigraphy and was translated into several languages and went into many editions.

Gignoux was born on Lyon in the family of stockbroker Antoine with origins in Nyon. He studied natural sciences at the École Normale Superieure and under Charles Depéret at Lycée Ampère, Lyon from 1901. From 1905 he taught at Besançon high school for two years. He moved to Grenoble in 1909 to work under Wilfrid Kilian (1862-1925) but his study was interrupted by World War I. His doctoral thesis of 1913 won the Fontannes prize. He enlisted in 1914 and worked in the army meteorological unit along with Pierre Lory. He returned after the war to join the Faculty of Sciences, Toulouse between 1918 and 1919. He was involved in organizing geology teaching at Strasbourg from 1919 to 1925. In 1926 he took the place of Kilian at the University of Grenoble and served as professor until his retirement in 1953. He also served as Dean of the Faculty of Sciences from 1940 to 1953. His students included André Allix and David Schneegans.

Gignoux married Marie Garel in 1909 and they had five sons and a daughter. He died at Grenoble where a street, Rue Maurice-Gignoux, was named in his memory.
