= Reuverian =

Geological stage

The Reuverian is a geological stage recognised in the Netherlands and northwestern Europe. It is dated approximately 2.6 million years ago, and is part of the late Pliocene.

Clay deposits from the Reuverian stage can be found in the Netherlands and neighbouring parts of Germany. The stage is named after the town of Reuver, in the Meuse valley.
