= Karl Mayer-Eymar =

Franco-Swiss paleontologist and geologist

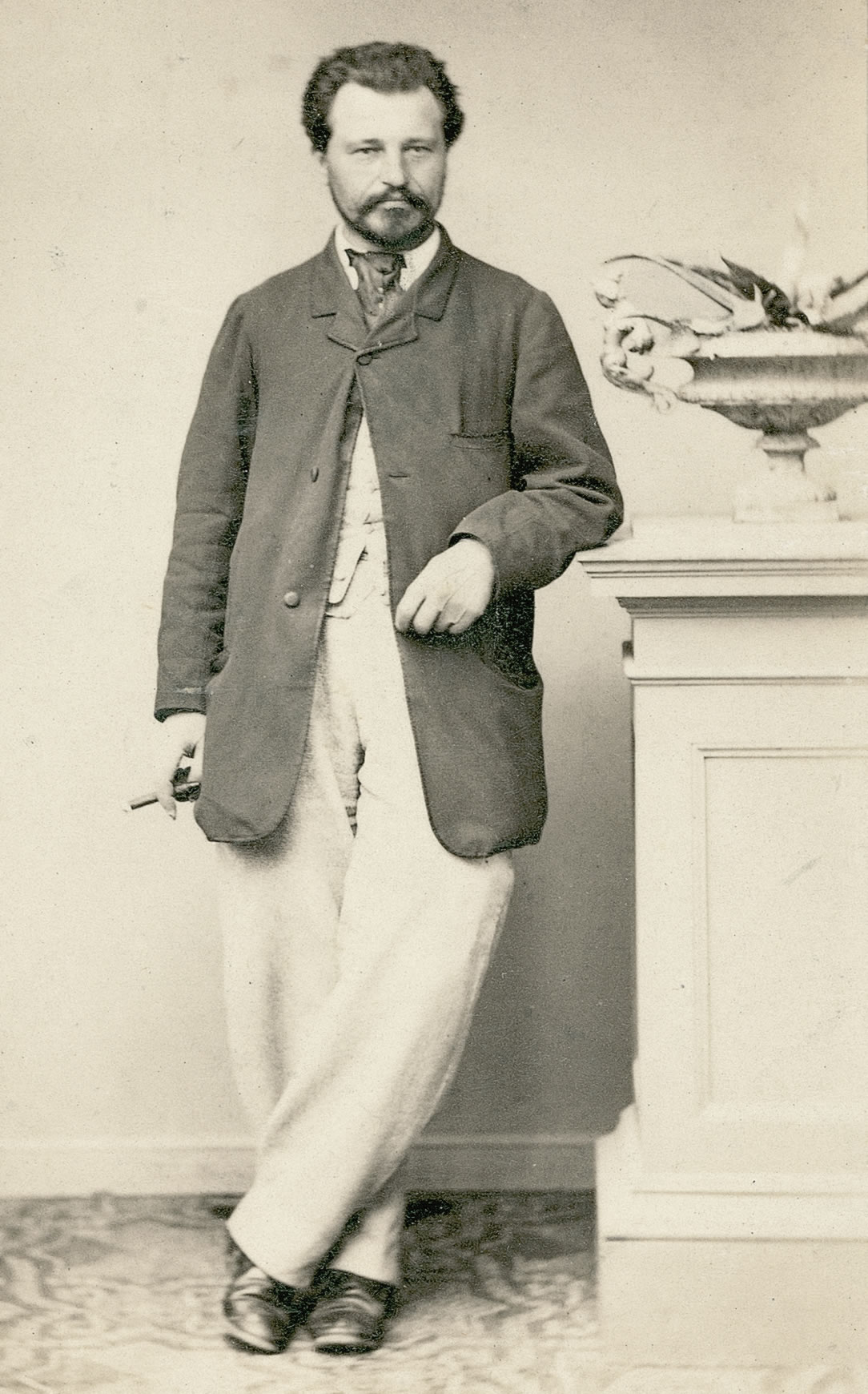
- Born: Karl Mayer; 29 July 1826; Marseilles
- Died: 25 February 1907 (aged 80)
- Other names: Karl David Wilhelm Mayer-Eymar
- Education: University of Zurich
- Occupations: paleontologist and geologist
- Known for: classifying the stratigraphy of the Tertiary into 12 stages
- Notable work: Versuch einer neuen Klassifikation der Tertiär-Gebilde Europas (An Attempt at a New Classification of the Tertiary Formations of Europe)
- Parents: Carl Friederich Mayer (father); Elisabeth Maria Fraziska Kunkler (mother)

Karl David Wilhelm Mayer-Eymar (29 July 1826 – 25 February 1907) was a Franco-Swiss paleontologist and geologist known for his work on classifying the stratigraphy of the Tertiary into 12 stages. He was born Karl Mayer but added the anagram Eymar around 1865 to distinguish his name from others, and the nickname "Tertiary Mayer" was also used. He was a major collector of fossils and described many molluscs.

Son of a Swiss businessman Carl Friederich Mayer and Elisabeth Maria Fraziska Kunkler, he was born in Marseilles and was educated at Renne and St Gallen when his father worked as a merchant. When his father died in 1839, he was taken care of by an uncle in St. Gallen where he began to collect marine fossils even as schoolboy. He joined University of Zurich in 1846 to study medicine but shifted to study paleontology and stratigraphy. An influential teacher was Arnold Escher von der Linth. After graduating in 1851 he worked at the Museum d'Histoire Naturelle at Paris under Charles Henry Dessalines d'Orbigny. He moved to the Zurich Polytechnische Hochschule in 1858 and became a curator of the collections, becoming a professor in 1875. He was considered a boring teacher who dictated tables. In 1857 he published his most influential work Versuch einer neuen Klassifikation der Tertiär-Gebilde Europas (An Attempt at a New Classification of the Tertiary Formations of Europe) in which he classified the European Tertiary into 12 stages of which the Bartonian, Aquitanian, Tortonian, Astian, and Piacenzian still continue to be in use. Mayer-Eymar classified several sub-stages within the Cenozoic based on his stratigraphic studies. He presented his ideas at the 4th International Geological Congress in London in 1888. He took a keen interest in earth history and the sedimentary stages of which he recognized 64. His collections are held in ETH-Zurich.

Mayer-Eymer was awarded a Barlow-prize (1892) and the Prix Savignyin (1894). Several gastropods including Eymarella, Stolidoma mayeri, Neritina mayeri and Neritina mayeri have been named after him.
