= Stage (stratigraphy) =

Unit in stratigraphy

Units in geochronology and stratigraphy
Segments of rock (strata) in chronostratigraphy	Time spans in geochronology	Notes to geochronological units
Eonothem	Eon	4 total, half a billion years or more
Erathem	Era	10 defined, several hundred million years
System	Period	22 defined, tens to ~one hundred million years
Series	Epoch	38 defined, tens of millions of years
Stage	Age	101 defined, millions of years
Chronozone	Chron	subdivision of an age, not used by the ICS timescale

In chronostratigraphy, a stage is a succession of rock strata laid down in a single age on the geologic timescale, which usually represents millions of years of deposition. A given stage of rock and the corresponding age of time will by convention have the same name, and the same boundaries.

Rock series are divided into stages, just as geological epochs are divided into ages. Stages are divided into smaller stratigraphic units called chronozones or substages, and added together into superstages.

The term faunal stage is sometimes used, referring to the fact that the same fauna (animals) are found throughout the layer (by definition).

== Definition ==
Stages are primarily defined by a consistent set of fossils (biostratigraphy) or a consistent magnetic polarity (see paleomagnetism) in the rock. Usually one or more index fossils that are common, found worldwide, easily recognized, and limited to a single stage — or, at most, a few stages — are used to define the stage's bottom. Thus, for example, in the local North American subdivision, a paleontologist finding fragments of the trilobite Olenellus would identify the beds as being from the Waucoban Stage, whereas fragments of a later trilobite such as Elrathia would identify the stage as Albertan.

Stages were important in the 19th and early 20th centuries as they were the major tool available for dating and correlating rock units prior to the development of seismology and radioactive dating in the second half of the 20th century. Microscopic analysis of the rock (petrology) is also sometimes useful in confirming that a given segment of rock is from a particular stage.

Originally, faunal stages were only defined regionally. As additional stratigraphic and geochronologic tools were developed, they were defined over ever broader areas. More recently, the adjective "faunal" has been dropped as regional and global correlations of rock sequences have become relatively certain and there is less need for faunal labels to define the age of formations. A tendency developed to use European and, to a lesser extent, Asian stage names for the same time period worldwide, even though the faunas in other regions often had little in common with the stage as originally defined.

== International standardization ==
Boundaries and names are established by the International Commission on Stratigraphy (ICS) of the International Union of Geological Sciences. As of 2008, the ICS is nearly finished with a task begun in 1974, subdividing the Phanerozoic eonothem into internationally accepted stages using two types of benchmark. For younger stages, a Global Boundary Stratotype Section and Point (GSSP), a physical outcrop clearly demonstrates the boundary. For older stages, a Global Standard Stratigraphic Age (GSSA) is an absolute date. The benchmarks will give a much greater certainty that results can be compared with confidence in the date determinations, and such results will have farther scope than any evaluation based solely on local knowledge and conditions.

In many regions local subdivisions and classification criteria are still used along with the newer internationally coordinated uniform system, but once the research establishes a more complete international system, it is expected that local systems will be abandoned.

== Stages and lithostratigraphy ==
Stages can include many lithostratigraphic units (for example formations, beds, members, etc.) of differing rock types that were being laid down in different environments at the same time. In the same way, a lithostratigraphic unit can include a number of stages or parts of them.

== See also ==
- European land mammal age
- Geologic record
- Geologic time scale
- North American land mammal age
- Type locality (geology)
- List of geochronologic names
- List of Global Boundary Stratotype Sections and Points
