= List of Global Boundary Stratotype Sections and Points =

This is a list of Global Boundary Stratotype Sections and Points. Since 1977, Global Boundary Stratotype Sections and Points (abbreviated GSSPs) are internationally agreed upon reference points on stratigraphic sections of rock which define the lower boundaries of stages on the geologic time scale. They are selected by the International Commission on Stratigraphy based on multiple factors, but their accessibility and the degree to which they are representative of the same boundary on sections worldwide are among the most important.

Since GSSPs require well-preserved sections of rock without interruptions in sedimentation, and since most are defined by different stages of animal life, defining them becomes progressively more difficult as one goes farther back in time.

== Organization of this list ==
This list is divided first into the geologic eras of the Phanerozoic (the Cenozoic, the Mesozoic, and the Paleozoic) and then into the geologic periods of each era. Each period is marked below the era bar on top of its subdivided epochs and stages. Each stage is assigned an age in mya, an acronym for million years ago, which is the age at which it began. Most of these ages are derived from astronomical cycles in sediments, magnetic data, biostratigraphic data, and radiometric dating methods. The GSSP assigned to each stage is that stage's lower boundary and oldest point.

Ages are given in "million year ago" (mya). They are obtained with different radiometric dating methods depending on the type of rock and its age. Ages that have a tilde (~) prefix are approximate ages for GSSPs that have not been defined or not been accurately dated.

The Status column has a "golden spike" for every GSSP which has been formally agreed by the ICS. Those without have only candidate sections which have not yet been formally ratified. The clock stands for times that are currently defined only by an age.

The "Defining markers" column lists the evidence in the rock used to define the boundary. (Ideally, these are applicable in rock sections worldwide.) Most of the boundaries rely on the fossil record (biologic), paleomagnetic data (magnetic), and/or climate data determined by carbon and oxygen isotopes.

== List ==
=== Cenozoic ===
==== Quaternary ====
Epoch	Stage	Age (mya)	Status	GSSP location	Defining markers	Geographic Coordinates	References
Holocene
Holocene	Meghalayan	0.0042		Mawmluh Cave, Meghalaya, India	Climatic: 4.2-kiloyear event.	25.2622°N 91.7150°E	
Holocene	Northgrippian	0.0082		NGRIP1 ice core, Greenland	Climatic: 8.2-kiloyear event.	75.1000°N 42.3200°W	
Holocene	Greenlandian	0.0117		NGRIP2 ice core, Greenland	Climatic: End of the Younger Dryas stadial.	75.1000°N 42.3200°W	
Pleistocene
Pleistocene	Upper/Late	0.129		-	Climatic: Marine Isotope Substage 5e	-	-
Pleistocene	Chibanian	0.774		Chiba, Japan	Magnetic: Brunhes-Matuyama magnetic reversal.	35.2943°N 140.1465°E	
Pleistocene	Calabrian	1.8		Vrica Section, Calabria, Italy	Magnetic: Approximately 15 ka after the end of magnetic polarity chronozone C2n (Olduvai).; Biologic: Immediately above extinction Discoaster brouweri (Haptophyte).; Sedimentologic: Boundary between a sapropelic bed and marine claystones.	39.0385°N 17.1348°E	
Pleistocene	Gelasian	2.58		Monte San Nicola Section, Gela, Sicily, Italy	Magnetic: Base of magnetic polarity chronozone C2r (Matuyama).; Biologic: Extinction of Discoaster pentaradiatus and Discoaster surculus (Haptophyte).	37.146468°N 14.204562°E	

==== Neogene ====
Epoch	Stage	Age (mya)	Status	GSSP location	Defining markers	Geographic Coordinates	References
Pliocene
Pliocene	Piacenzian	3.6		Punta Piccola Section, Porto Empedocle, Sicily, Italy	Magnetic: Base of magnetic polarity chronozone C2An (Gauss).; Biologic: Extinction of Globorotalia margaritae and Pulleniatina primalis (Planktonic foraminifera).	37.289386°N 13.491443°E	
Pliocene	Zanclean	5.333		Heraclea Minoa section Heraclea Minoa, Cattolica Eraclea, Sicily, Italy	Magnetic: Top of magnetic polarity chronozone C3r.; Biologic: First appearance of Ceratolithus acutus and near extinction of Triquetrorhabdulus rugosus (Haptophyte).	37.392435°N 13.281052°E	
Miocene
Miocene	Messinian	7.246		Oued Akrech section, Rabat, Morocco	Magnetic: Within magnetic polarity chronozone C3Br.1r.; Biologic: First regular occurrence of the Globorotalia miotumida (Planktonic foraminifera).; Biologic: First appearance of Amaurolithus delicatus (Haptophyte).	33.925050°N 6.809047°W	
Miocene	Tortonian	11.63		Monte dei Corvi Beach section, Ancona, Italy	Magnetic: Within normal-polarity subchron C5r.2n; Biologic: Last Common Occurrence of the Discoaster kugleri (Haptophyte).; Biologic: Last Common Occurrence of the Globigerinoides subquadratus (Planktonic foraminifera).; Climatic: Oxygen isotope event Mi-5.	43.587242°N 13.566148°E	
Miocene	Serravallian	13.82		Ras il Pellegrin section, Fomm ir-Riħ Bay, Malta	Magnetic: Within magnetic polarity chronozone C5ABr.; Biologic: Below first appearance of Sphenolithus heteromorphus (Haptophyte); Climatic: Mi3b isotopic event (Global cooling episode).	35.9139°N 14.3361°E	
Miocene	Langhian	15.98		At 17.84 m in the 'Lower La Vedova Beach' section, Ancona, Italy	Magnetic: Near top of magnetic polarity chronozone C5Cn.1n.; Biologic: Near first appearance of Praeorbulina glomerosa (Planktonic foraminifera).	43.5919°N 13.5623°E	
Miocene	Burdigalian	20.45		Candidate sections: Astronomically tuned ODP core (e.g. Ceara Rise, Leg 154)	Near FAD of Globigerinoides altiaperturus (planktonic foraminifer) or near top of magnetic polarity chronozone C6An	-	
Miocene	Aquitanian	23.04		Lemme-Carrosio Section, Carrosio, Italy	Magnetic: Base of magnetic polarity chronozone C6Cn.2n.; Biologic: Near first appearance of Paragloborotalia kugleri (Planktonic foraminifera).	44.6601°N 8.83928°E	

==== Paleogene ====
Epoch	Stage	Age (mya)	Status	GSSP location	Defining markers	Geographic Coordinates	References
Oligocene
Oligocene	Chattian	27.3		Monte Cagnero, Central Apennines, Italy	Biological: last occurrence of the planktonic foraminifer Chiloguembelina (Base of Foram Zone P21b)	43.646748°N 12.467771°E	
Oligocene	Rupelian	33.9		Massignano quarry section, Massignano, Ancona, Italy	Biologic: Extinction of Hantkenina and Cribrohantkenina (Planktonic foraminifera).	43.536038°N 13.592499°E	
Eocene
Eocene	Priabonian	37.71		Alano section, Piave river, Venetian Prealps, Belluno, Italy	Biologic: Last appearance of large acarininids and Morozovelloides crassatus; The Base of common and continuous Cribrocentrum erbae and the Top of Chiasmolithus grandis; Magnetic: The Base of Chronozone C17n and Subchron C17n.2n	45.9141°N 11.9180°E	
Eocene	Bartonian	41.03		Contessa highway section Gubbio, Central Apennines, Italy	Biologic: Near Extinction of Reticulofenestra reticulata (Haptophyte)	43.37972°N 12.56219°E	-
Eocene	Lutetian	48.07		Gorrondatxe sea-cliff section, Western Pyrenees, Basque Country, Spain	Biologic: First appearance of Hantkenina (Planktonic foraminifera).	43.3796°N 3.0143°W	
Eocene	Ypresian	56		Dababiya section, Luxor, Egypt	Climatic: Base of negative Carbon Isotope Excursion (CIE).	25.5000°N 32.5311°E	
Paleocene
Paleocene	Thanetian	59.24		Zumaia Section, Basque Country, Spain	Magnetic: Base of magnetic polarity chronozone C26n.	43.2996°N 2.2609°W	
Paleocene	Selandian	61.66		Zumaia Section, Basque Country, Spain	Chemical: Onset of sea-level drop and carbon isotope shift.; Magnetic: 30 precession cycles after the top of magnetic polarity Chron 27n	43.2992°N 2.2610°W	
Paleocene	Danian	66		El Kef Section, El Kef, Tunisia	Iridium enriched layer associated with a major meteorite impact and subsequent extinction event.	36.1537°N 8.6486°E	

=== Mesozoic ===
==== Cretaceous ====
Epoch	Stage	Age (mya)	Status	GSSP location	Defining markers	Geographic Coordinates	References
Upper
Upper	Maastrichtian	72.2		Grande Carrière quarry, Landes, France	Biologic: 12 biostratigraphic criteria; Biologic: First appearance of Pachydiscus neubergicus (Ammonite) is just above the boundary.	43.6795°N 1.1133°W	
Upper	Campanian	83.6		Bottaccione, Gubbio, Italy	Magnetic: Base of Chron C33r.	43.3627°N 12.5828°E	
Upper	Santonian	85.7		Olazagutia, Spain	Biologic: First appearance of Cladoceramus undulatoplicatus (Inoceramid bivalve).	42.8668°N 2.1968°W	
Upper	Coniacian	89.8		Salzgitter-Salder quarry, Germany	Biologic: First appearance of Cremnoceramus rotundatus (Inoceramid bivalve).	52.1243°N 10.3295°E	
Upper	Turonian	93.9		Rock Canyon, Colorado, United States	Biologic: First appearance of Watinoceras devonense (Ammonite).	38.2822°N 104.7275°W	
Upper	Cenomanian	100.5		Mont Risoux, Hautes-Alpes, France	Biologic: First appearance of Rotalipora globotruncanoides (Planktonic foraminifera)	44.391120°N 5.510970°E	
Lower
Lower	Albian	113.2		Col de Pré-Guittard section, Arnayon, Drôme, France	Biologic: first appearance of the planktonic foraminiferan Microhedbergella renilaevis.	44.507861°N 5.297250°E	
Lower	Aptian	121.4		Candidate section: Gorgo a Cerbara, Piobbico, Central Apennines, Italy	Magnetic: Base of magnetic polarity chronozone M0r.; Biologic: Near first appearance of Paradeshayesites oglanlensis (Ammonite).	-	-
Lower	Barremian	125.77		Río Argos, Caravaca de la Cruz, Murcia Province, Spain	Biologic: First appearance of Ammonite Taveraidiscus hugii.	-	
Lower	Hauterivian	132.6		La Charce, Drôme, France	Biologic: First appearance of the Ammonite genus Acanthodiscus.	44.4694°N 5.4437°E	
Lower	Valanginian	137.05		Montbrun-les-Bains, Drôme, France	Biologic: First appearance of Thurmanniceras pertransiens (Ammonite).	44.2031°N 5.4175°E	
Lower	Berriasian	143.1		Candidate section: Vaca Muerta, Neuquén Basin, Argentina	Candidates: Magnetic—base of Chron M18r; Base of Calpionellid zone B		

==== Jurassic ====
Epoch	Stage	Age (mya)	Status	GSSP location	Defining markers	Geographic Coordinates	References
Upper
Upper	Tithonian	149.2		Candidate sections: Mt. Crussol, France; Canjuers, France; Fornazzo, Sicily	Magnetic: Base of magnetic polarity chronozone M22An.; Biologic: Near first appearance of Hybonoticeras hybonotum (Ammonite).; Biologic: First appearance of genus Gravesia (Ammonite).	-	-
Upper	Kimmeridgian	154.8		Flodigarry, Isle of Skye, Scotland, U.K.	Biologic: First appearance of Pictonia baylei (Ammonite).	57.6610°N 6.2455°W	
Upper	Oxfordian	161.5		Candidate sections: Redcliff Point, Dorset, England, U.K.; Savouron, Provence, France	Biologic: Horizon of Cardioceras redcliffense (Ammonite).	-	-
Middle
Middle	Callovian	165.3		Candidate sections: Pfeffingen, Swabian Alb, Germany; Russia	Biologic: First appearance of genus Kepplerites (Ammonite).	-	-
Middle	Bathonian	168.2		Ravin du Bès, Bas-Auran, Alpes de Haute, France	Biologic: First appearance of Gonolkites convergen (Ammonite).	43.9606°N 6.3153°E	
Middle	Bajocian	170.9		Cabo Mondego, Portugal	Biologic: First appearance of Hyperlioceras mundum, Hyperlioceras furcatum, Braunsina aspera, and Braunsina elegantula(Ammonite); Biologic: First appearance of genus Hyperlioceras (Ammonite).	40.1992°N 8.9042°W	
Middle	Aalenian	174.7		Fuentelsaz, Spain	Biologic: First appearance of Leioceras opalinum and Leioceras lineatum; Biologic: First appearance of genus Leioceras (Ammonite).	41°4′44.9″N 1°49′49.2″W	
Lower
Lower	Toarcian	184.2		Peniche, Portugal	Biologic: First appearance of D. (E.) simplex (Ammonite).	39.3708°N 9.3853°W	
Lower	Pliensbachian	192.9		Robin Hood's Bay, Yorkshire, England, U.K.	Biologic: First appearance of Bifericeras donovani and genera Apoderoceras (Ammonite).	54.4069°N 0.4975°W	
Lower	Sinemurian	199.5		East Quantoxhead, West Somerset, England, UK	Biologic: First appearance of the Vermiceras quantoxense, Vermiceras palmeri (Ammonite).	51.1909°N 3.2364°W	
Lower	Hettangian	201.4		Kuhjoch section, Karwendel mountains, Northern Calcareous Alps, Austria	Biologic: Near first appearance of smooth Psiloceras spela group (Ammonite).	47.4839°N 11.5306°E	

==== Triassic ====
Epoch	Stage	Age (mya)	Status	GSSP location	Defining markers	Geographic Coordinates	References
Upper
Upper	Rhaetian	~205.7		Candidate sections: Steinbergkogel, Austria; Pignola-Abriola, Italy; Turkey; British Columbia	Biologic: First appearance of Misikella posthernsteini (Conodont).; Biologic: Near first appearance of genus Cochloceras (Ammonite).; Biologic: Near first appearance of Epigondolella mosheri (Conodont).; Biologic: Near first appearance of Proparvicingula moniliformis (radiolarian).	-	-
Upper	Norian	~227.3		Candidate sections: Black Bear Ridge, British Columbia; Pizzo Mondello, Sicily	Base of Stikinoceras kerri ammonoid zone and near FAD of Metapolygnathus echinatus within the M. communisti conodont zones.	-	-
Upper	Carnian	~237		Prati di Stuores, Dolomites, Italy	Biologic: First appearance of Daxatina canadensis (Ammonite).; Biologic: Near first appearance of Metapolygnathus polygnathiformis (Conodont).; Magnetic: Above magnetic zone S2n.	46.5269°N 11.9303°E	
Middle
Middle	Ladinian	241.464		Bagolino, Lombardian pre-Alps, Italy	Biologic: First appearance of Eoprotrachyceras curionii (Ammonite).; Biologic: First appearance of Budurovignathus praehungaricus (Conodont).	45.818380°N 10.470270°E	
Middle	Anisian	247		Candidate sections: Desli Caira, Northern Dobruja, Romania; Guandao, Guizhou, China	Biologic: First appearance of Chiosella timorensis (Conodont).; Magnetic: Base of magnetic zone MT1n.	45.0742°N 28.8022°E	
Lower
Lower	Olenekian	250.8		Candidate sections: Mud (Muth) village, Spiti valley, India; Chaohu, China	Biologic: First appearance of Neospathodus waageni (Conodont).; Biologic: Near first appearance of genera Flemingites and Euflemingites (Ammonite).	31.9654°N 78.0246°E	
Lower	Induan	251.902		Meishan, Zhejiang, China	Biologic: First appearance of Hindeodus parvus (Conodont).	31.0798°N 119.7058°E	

=== Paleozoic ===
==== Permian ====
Epoch	Stage	Age (mya)	Status	GSSP location	Defining markers	Geographic Coordinates	References
Lopingian
Lopingian	Changhsingian	254.14		Zhejiang, China	Biologic: Near first appearance of Clarkina wangi (Conodont).	31.0819°N 119.7064°E	
Lopingian	Wuchiapingian	259.857		Penglaitan Section, Laibin, Guangxi, China	Biologic: First appearance of Clarkina postbitteri postbitteri (Conodont).	23.6953°N 109.3211°E	
Guadalupian
Guadalupian	Capitanian	264.28		Nipple Hill, Guadalupe Mountains, Texas, U.S.A.	Biologic: First appearance of Jinogondolella postserrata (Conodont).	31.9091°N 104.7892°W	
Guadalupian	Wordian	266.9		Guadalupe Pass, Guadalupe Mountains, Texas, U.S.A.	Biologic: First appearance of Jinogondolella aserrata (Conodont).	31.8658°N 104.8328°W	
Guadalupian	Roadian	274.4		Stratotype Canyon, Guadalupe Mountains, Texas, U.S.A.	Biologic: First appearance of Jinogondolella nanginkensis (Conodont).	31.8767°N 104.8768°W	
Cisuralian
Cisuralian	Kungurian	283.3		Candidate section: Mechetlino, Southern Ural Mountains, Russia	Biologic: Near first appearance of Neostreptognathodus pnevi (Conodont).	-	
Cisuralian	Artinskian	290.1		Dalny Tulkas section, Southern Ural Mountains, Russia	Biologic: First appearance of Sweetognathus whitei (Conodont).	53.88847°N 56.51615°E	
Cisuralian	Sakmarian	293.52		Usolka section, Southern Urals, Russia	Biologic: First appearance of Mesogondolella monstra (Conodont).	53.9247°N 56.7287°E	
Cisuralian	Asselian	298.9		Aidaralash, Ural Mountains, Kazakhstan	Biologic: First appearance of Streptognathodus isolatus within the morphotype Streptognathodus wabaunsensis chronocline (Conodont).	50.2458°N 57.8914°E	

==== Carboniferous ====
Epoch	Stage	Age (mya)	Status	GSSP location	Defining markers	Geographic Coordinates	References
Pennsylvanian
Pennsylvanian	Gzhelian	303.7		Candidate sections: Ural Mountains; Nashui, Luodian County, Guizhou, China	Biologic: First appearance Idiognathodus simulator and close to first appearance of Shumardites	-	
Pennsylvanian	Kasimovian	307		Candidate sections: Ural Mountains; United States; Nashui, Luodian County, Guizhou, China	Biologic: First appearance of Protriticites or 1 million years older Montiparus montiparus	-	
Pennsylvanian	Moscovian	315.2		Candidate sections: Ural Mountains; Nashui, Luodian County, Guizhou, China	Biologic: First appearance of Idiognathoides postsulcatus or Declinognathodus donetzianus	-	
Pennsylvanian	Bashkirian	323.4		Arrow Canyon, Nevada, United States	Biologic: First appearance of Declinognathodus nodiliferus (Conodont).	36.7333°N 114.7778°W	
Mississippian
Mississippian	Serpukhovian	330.3		Candidate sections: Verkhnyaya Kardailovka, Ural Mountains; Nashui, Luodian County, Guizhou, China	Biologic: First appearance of Lochriea ziegleri	-	
Mississippian	Visean	346.7		Pengchong Section, Guangxi, China	Biologic: First appearance of Eoparastaffella simplex	24.4333°N 109.4500°E	
Mississippian	Tournaisian	358.86		La Serre, Montagne Noire, France	Biologic: First appearance of Siphonodella sulcata (Conodont).; In 2006 it was discovered that this GSSP has biostratigraphic problems.	43.55554°N 3.35868°E	

==== Devonian ====
Epoch	Stage	Age (mya)	Status	GSSP location	Defining markers	Geographic Coordinates	References
Upper
Upper	Famennian	372.15		Coumiac quarry,Coumiac Montagne Noire, France	Biologic: Abundant occurrence of Palmatolepis triangularis (Conodont).; Biologic: Upper Kellwasser Extinction of all Ancyrodella and Ozarkodina and most Palmatolepis, Polygnathus, and Ancyrognathus.; Biologic: Coincides with the first appearance of Phoenixites frechi (Goniatite).	43.4705°N 3.0597°E	
Upper	Frasnian	382.31		Col du Puech de la Suque, Montagne Noire, France	Biologic: First appearance of Ancyrodella rotundiloba (Conodont).	43.5032°N 3.0868°E	
Middle
Middle	Givetian	387.95		Jebel Mech Irdane, Tafilalt, Morocco	Biologic: First appearance of Polygnathus hemiansatus (Conodont).; Biologic: Just below first appearance of Maenioceras (Goniatite).	31.2374°N 4.3541°W	
Middle	Eifelian	393.47		Wetteldorf Richtschnitt section, Wetteldorf, Eifel, Germany	Biologic: First appearance of Polygnathus costatus partitus (Conodont).	50.1496°N 6.4716°E	
Lower
Lower	Emsian	410.62		Zinzil'ban Gorge, Uzbekistan	Biologic: First appearance of Polygnathus kitabicus (Conodont).	39.2000°N 67.3056°E	
Lower	Pragian	413.02		Velká Chuchle quarry Velká Chuchle, Prague, Czech Republic	Biologic: First appearance of Eognathodus sulcatus (Conodont).	50.0147°N 14.3726°E	
Lower	Lochkovian	419.62		Klonk, Prague, Czech Republic	Biologic: First appearance of Monograptus uniformis (graptolite).	49.90083°N 14.06111°E	

==== Silurian ====
Epoch	Stage	Age (mya)	Status	GSSP location	Defining markers	Geographic Coordinates	References
Přídolí		422.7		Požáry Section, Řeporyje District, Prague, Czech Republic	Biologic: First appearance of Monograptus parultimus (Graptolite).	50.0277°N 14.3249°E	
Ludlow
Ludlow	Ludfordian	425		Sunnyhill, Ludlow, Shropshire, England, U.K.	Imprecise GSSP.; Biologic: Near first appearance of Saetograptus leintwardinensis (Graptolite).	52.3592°N 2.7772°W	
Ludlow	Gorstian	426.7		Pitch Coppice, Ludlow, Shropshire, England, U.K.	Biologic: First appearance Saetograptus (Colonograptus) varians	52.3592°N 2.7772°W	
Wenlock
Wenlock	Homerian	430.6		Whitwell Coppice, Homer, England, U.K.	Biologic: First appearance of Cyrtograptus lundgreni (Graptolite).	52.6156°N 2.5647°W	
Wenlock	Sheinwoodian	432.9		Hughley Brook, Apedale, England, U.K.	Imprecise GSSP. Will be reexamined.; Biologic: Currently between acritarch biozone 5 and last appearance of Pterospathodus amorphognathoides. Candidate boundaries are a conodont boundary (Ireviken datum 2) which is close to the murchisoni graptolite biozone.	52.5811°N 2.6389°W	
Llandovery
Llandovery	Telychian	438.6		El Pintado section, Province of Seville, Spain	Biologic: FAD of the graptolite Spirograptus guerichi	37.9853°N 5.9285°W	
Llandovery	Aeronian	440.5		Hlásná Třebaň section, Czech Republic	Biologic: First appearance of Demirastrites triangulatus (Graptolite).	49.9230°N 14.2119°E	
Llandovery	Rhuddanian	443.1		Dob's Linn, Moffat, Dumfries-shire, Scotland, U.K.	Biologic: First appearance of Akidograptus ascensus and Parakidograptus acuminatus (Graptolite).; 1.6 m above the base of the Birkhill Shale Formation.	55.4400°N 3.2700°W	

==== Ordovician ====
Epoch	Stage	Age (mya)	Status	GSSP location	Defining markers	Geographic Coordinates	References
Upper
Upper	Hirnantian	445.2		Wangjiawan section Wangjiawan, Yichang, China	Biologic: First appearance of Metabolograptus extraordinarius (Graptolite).; Climatic: Base of major positive carbon isotope excursion.; Climatic: Beginning of sea-level fall associated with onset of a major glaciation.	30.9841°N 111.4197°E	
Upper	Katian	452.8		Black Knob Ridge section, Oklahoma, United States	Biologic: First appearance of Diplacanthograptus caudatus (Graptolite).; Climatic: Just below base of Guttenberg carbon isotope excursion.	34.4305°N 96.0746°W	
Upper	Sandbian	458.2		Fågelsång section Sularp Brook, Skåne, Sweden	Biologic: First appearance of Nemagraptus gracilis (Graptolite).; 1.4 m below a phosphorite marker bed.	55.7137°N 13.3255°E	
Middle
Middle	Darriwilian	469.4		Huangnitang Section Huangnitang Village, Changshan, Zhejiang, China	Biologic: First appearance of Levisograptus austrodentatus (Graptolite).	28.8539°N 118.4897°E	
Middle	Dapingian	471.3		Huanghuachang section Huanghuachang, Yichang, China	Biologic: Lowest appearance of Baltoniodus triangularis (Conodont).	30.8605°N 111.3740°E	
Lower
Lower	Floian	477.1		Diabasbrottet quarry, Västergötland, Sweden	Biologic: Lowest appearance of Paratetragraptus approximatus (Graptolite).	58.3589°N 12.5024°E	
Lower	Tremadocian	486.85		Greenpoint section Green Point, Newfoundland, Canada	Biologic: First appearance of Iapetognathus fluctivagus (Conodont).; Biologic: Planktonic graptolites occur 4.8 m above boundary.; Climatic: Coincides with a peak in carbon isotopes.	49.6829°N 57.9653°W	

==== Cambrian ====
Epoch	Stage	Age (mya)	Status	GSSP location	Defining markers	Geographic Coordinates	References
Furongian
Furongian	Stage 10	491		Candidate sections: Duibian, Zhejiang, China; Lawson Cove, Utah, United States	Candidates: Biologic: First appearance of Lotagnostus americanus (Trilobite).; Biologic: First appearance of Cordylodus andresi (Conodont).; Biologic: First appearance of Eoconodontus notchpeakensis (Conodont).	-	
Furongian	Jiangshanian	~494.2		Duibian B Section Duibian, Zhejiang, China	Biologic: First appearance of Agnostotes orientalis (Trilobite).	28.815967°N 118.614933°E	
Furongian	Paibian	~497		Paibi section Paibi, Hunan, China	Biologic: First appearance of the agnostoid Glyptagnostus reticulatus (Trilobite).; Climatic: Coincides with base of the Steptoean positive carbon isotope excursion (SPICE).	28.3895°N 109.5257°E	
Miaolingian
Miaolingian	Guzhangian	~500.5		Luoyixi section Luoyixi, Guzhang, Hunan, China	Biologic: First appearance of Lejopyge laevigata (Trilobite).	28.7200°N 109.9647°E	
Miaolingian	Drumian	~504.5		Drumian section Wheeler Shale, Utah, U.S.A.	Biologic: First appearance of Ptychagnostus atavus (Trilobite).	39.5117°N 112.9915°W	
Miaolingian	Wuliuan	~506.5		Wuliu-Zengjiayan, Guizhou, China	Biologic: First appearance of Oryctocephalus indicus (Trilobite).	26.0807°N 108.4138°E	
Series 2
Series 2	Stage 4	~514.5		None	Biologic: First appearance Arthricocephalus chauveaui (Trilobite species).; Biologic: First appearance Olenellus or Redlichia (Trilobite genera).	-	
Series 2	Stage 3	~521		None	Biologic: First appearance of trilobites (possibly Lemdadella)	-	
Terreneuvian
Terreneuvian	Stage 2	~529		None	Biologic: First appearance of small shelly fauna or archaeocyathids	-	-
Terreneuvian	Fortunian	538.8		Fortune head section, Newfoundland, Canada	Biologic: First appearance of Treptichnus pedum (trace fossil).	47.0762°N 55.8310°W	

=== Precambrian ===
==== Proterozoic ====
Era	Period	Age (mya)	Status	GSSP location	Defining markers	Geographic Coordinates	References
Neoproterozoic
Neoproterozoic	Ediacaran	~635		Enorama Creek section, Flinders Ranges, South Australia	Geologic: Worldwide distinct cap carbonates.; Isotopic: Beginning of a distinctive pattern of secular changes in carbon isotopes.	31.3314°S 138.6334°E	
Neoproterozoic	Cryogenian	~720		Defined chronometrically with an interim calibrated age of ca. 720 Ma. GSSP is in progress.	Geologic: the GSSP has been recommended to be placed at a stratigraphic level beneath the first appearance of widespread glaciation associated with the Sturtian glacial epoch.	-	
Neoproterozoic	Tonian	1000		Defined chronometrically	-	-	
Mesoproterozoic
Mesoproterozoic	Stenian	1200		Defined chronometrically	-	-	
Mesoproterozoic	Ectasian	1400		Defined chronometrically	-	-	
Mesoproterozoic	Calymmian	1600		Defined chronometrically	-	-	
Paleoproterozoic
Paleoproterozoic	Statherian	1800		Defined chronometrically	-	-	
Paleoproterozoic	Orosirian	2050		Defined chronometrically	-	-	
Paleoproterozoic	Rhyacian	2300		Defined chronometrically	-	-	
Paleoproterozoic	Siderian	2500		Defined chronometrically	-	-	

==== Archean and Hadean ====
Eon	Era	Age (mya)	Status	GSSP/GSSA location	Defining markers	Geographic Coordinates	References
Archean
Archean	Neoarchean	2800		-	Defined chronometrically	-	-
Archean	Mesoarchean	3200		-	Defined chronometrically	-	-
Archean	Paleoarchean	3600		-	Defined chronometrically	-	-
Archean	Eoarchean	4031		Along the Acasta River, Northwest Territories, Canada	Defined chronometrically Ten oldest U-Pb zircon ages	65.1738°N 115.5538°W	
Hadean	-	4567.3		-	Defined chronometrically Formation of the Solar System	-	

== See also ==
- Global Boundary Stratotype Section and Point (GSSP)
- International Commission on Stratigraphy (ICS)
- Geologic time scale
- History of Earth
- Geological history of Earth
