= Middle Miocene =

Sub-epoch of the Miocene Epoch

System/ Period	Series/ Epoch	Stage/ Age	Age (Ma)	
Quaternary	Pleistocene	Gelasian	younger	
Neogene	Pliocene	Piacenzian	2.58	3.600
Neogene	Pliocene	Zanclean	3.600	5.333
Neogene	Miocene	Messinian	5.333	7.246
Neogene	Miocene	Tortonian	7.246	11.63
Neogene	Miocene	Serravallian	11.63	13.82
Neogene	Miocene	Langhian	13.82	15.97
Neogene	Miocene	Burdigalian	15.97	20.44
Neogene	Miocene	Aquitanian	20.44	23.03
Paleogene	Oligocene	Chattian	older	
Subdivision of the Neogene Period according to the ICS, as of 2017

The Middle Miocene is a sub-epoch of the Miocene epoch made up of two stages: the Langhian and Serravallian stages. The Middle Miocene is preceded by the Early Miocene, and followed by the Late Miocene.

The sub-epoch lasted from 15.97 ± 0.05 Ma (million years ago) to 11.608 ± 0.005 Ma. During this period, a sharp drop in global temperatures took place. This event is known as the Middle Miocene Climatic Transition.

For the purpose of establishing European land mammal ages, this sub-epoch is equivalent to the Astaracian age.
