= Late Miocene =

Sub-epoch of the Miocene Epoch

System/ Period	Series/ Epoch	Stage/ Age	Age (Ma)	
Quaternary	Pleistocene	Gelasian	younger	
Neogene	Pliocene	Piacenzian	2.58	3.600
Neogene	Pliocene	Zanclean	3.600	5.333
Neogene	Miocene	Messinian	5.333	7.246
Neogene	Miocene	Tortonian	7.246	11.63
Neogene	Miocene	Serravallian	11.63	13.82
Neogene	Miocene	Langhian	13.82	15.97
Neogene	Miocene	Burdigalian	15.97	20.44
Neogene	Miocene	Aquitanian	20.44	23.03
Paleogene	Oligocene	Chattian	older	
Subdivision of the Neogene Period according to the ICS, as of 2017

The Late Miocene (also known as Upper Miocene) is a sub-epoch of the Miocene epoch made up of two stages: the Tortonian and Messinian. It lasted from 11.63 Ma (million years ago) to 5.333 Ma.

== Biology ==
The gibbons (family Hylobatidae) and then the orangutans (genus Pongo) were the first groups to split from the line leading to the hominins, including humans, then gorillas (genus Gorilla), and finally the chimpanzees (genus Pan). The splitting date between hominin and chimpanzee lineages is placed by some between 4 and 8 million years ago, that is, during the Late Miocene.

In the Iberian Peninsula, the diversity of grazers increased while the diversity of browsers decline concomitantly with increasing aridity. Felids and canids also increased their diversity in this region at this time.
