= Early Miocene =

Sub-epoch of the Miocene Epoch

System/ Period	Series/ Epoch	Stage/ Age	Age (Ma)	
Quaternary	Pleistocene	Gelasian	younger	
Neogene	Pliocene	Piacenzian	2.58	3.600
Neogene	Pliocene	Zanclean	3.600	5.333
Neogene	Miocene	Messinian	5.333	7.246
Neogene	Miocene	Tortonian	7.246	11.63
Neogene	Miocene	Serravallian	11.63	13.82
Neogene	Miocene	Langhian	13.82	15.97
Neogene	Miocene	Burdigalian	15.97	20.44
Neogene	Miocene	Aquitanian	20.44	23.03
Paleogene	Oligocene	Chattian	older	
Subdivision of the Neogene Period according to the ICS, as of 2017

The Early Miocene (also known as Lower Miocene) is a sub-epoch of the Miocene Epoch made up of two stages: the Aquitanian and Burdigalian stages.

The sub-epoch lasted from 23.03 ± 0.05 Ma to 15.97 ± 0.05 Ma (million years ago). It was preceded by the Oligocene epoch. As the climate started to get cooler, the landscape started to change. New mammals evolved to replace the extinct animals of the Oligocene epoch. The first members of the hyena and weasel family started to evolve to replace the extinct Hyaenodon, entelodonts and bear-dogs. The chalicotheres survived the Oligocene epoch. A new genus of entelodont called Daeodon evolved in order to adapt to the new habitats and hunt the new prey animals of the Early Miocene epoch; it quickly became the top predator of North America. But it became extinct due to competition from Amphicyon, a newcomer from Eurasia. Amphicyon bested Daeodon because the bear-dog's larger brain, sharper teeth and longer legs built for longer chases helped it to overcome its prey.
