= Gibberula aquitanensis =

Scientific classification
- Kingdom: Animalia
- Phylum: Mollusca
- Class: Gastropoda
- Subclass: Caenogastropoda
- Order: Neogastropoda
- Family: Cystiscidae
- Subfamily: Cystiscinae
- Genus: Gibberula
- Species: †G. aquitanensis

Binomial name
- †Gibberula aquitanensis Lozouet, 1998

Extinct species of gastropod

Gibberula aquitanensis is an extinct species of sea snail, a marine gastropod mollusk, in the family Cystiscidae.

== Description ==
The length of the shell attains 2.22 mm.

== Distribution ==
This extinct species was found in Aquitanian strata in the Landes, France.
