= Alvania erentoezae =

Alvania erentoezae Temporal range: Early Tortonian

Scientific classification
- Kingdom: Animalia
- Phylum: Mollusca
- Class: Gastropoda
- Subclass: Caenogastropoda
- Order: Littorinimorpha
- Family: Rissoidae
- Genus: Alvania
- Species: A. erentoezae

Binomial name
- Alvania erentoezae İslamoğlu, 2006

Extinct species of gastropod

Alvania erentoezae is an extinct species of sea snail, a marine gastropod mollusk or micromollusk in the family Rissoidae.

== Description ==
The shell is slender. The aperture is round.

== Distribution ==
Western Taurids, Southwestern Turkey.
