= Alvania schwartzi =

Scientific classification
- Kingdom: Animalia
- Phylum: Mollusca
- Class: Gastropoda
- Subclass: Caenogastropoda
- Order: Littorinimorpha
- Superfamily: Rissooidea
- Family: Rissoidae
- Genus: Alvania
- Species: †A. schwartzi

Binomial name
- †Alvania schwartzi (M. Hörnes, 1856)

Synonyms
- † Alvania (Galeodinopsis) schwartzi (M. Hörnes, 1856); † Rissoa schwartzi M. Hörnes, 1856

Species of gastropod

Alvania schwartzi is an extinct species of minute sea snail, a marine gastropod mollusc or micromollusk in the family Rissoidae.

== Distribution ==
Fossils of this species were in Tortonian strata near Vienna, Austria.
