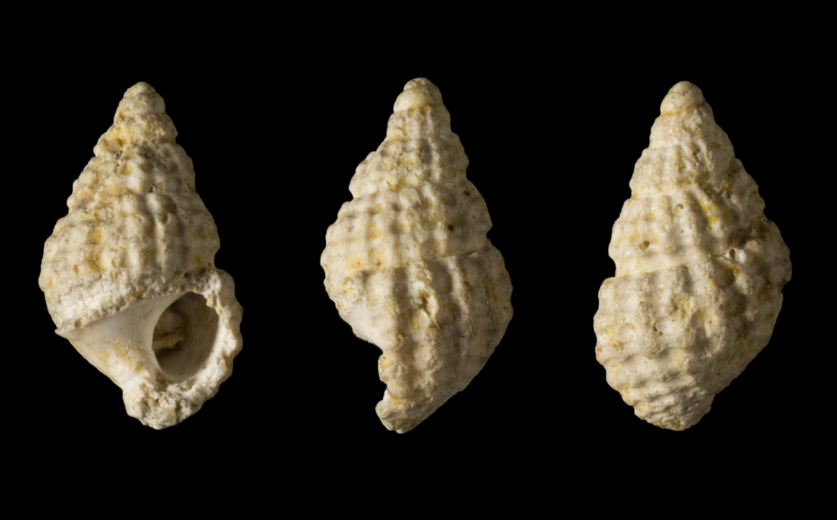
- Shell of Alvania oceani (specimen at MNHN, Paris)

Scientific classification
- Kingdom: Animalia
- Phylum: Mollusca
- Class: Gastropoda
- Subclass: Caenogastropoda
- Order: Littorinimorpha
- Superfamily: Rissooidea
- Family: Rissoidae
- Genus: Alvania
- Species: †A. oceani

Binomial name
- †Alvania oceani (d'Orbigny, 1852)

Synonyms
- † Alvania (Turbona) oceani (d'Orbigny, 1852); † Rissoa oceani d'Orbigny, 1852 (original combination)

= Alvania oceani =

Species of gastropod

Alvania oceani is an extinct species of minute sea snail, a marine gastropod mollusc or micromollusk in the family Rissoidae.

== Distribution ==
Fossils of this species were in Miocene strata in the Landes, France and Tortonian strata near Vienna, Austria.
