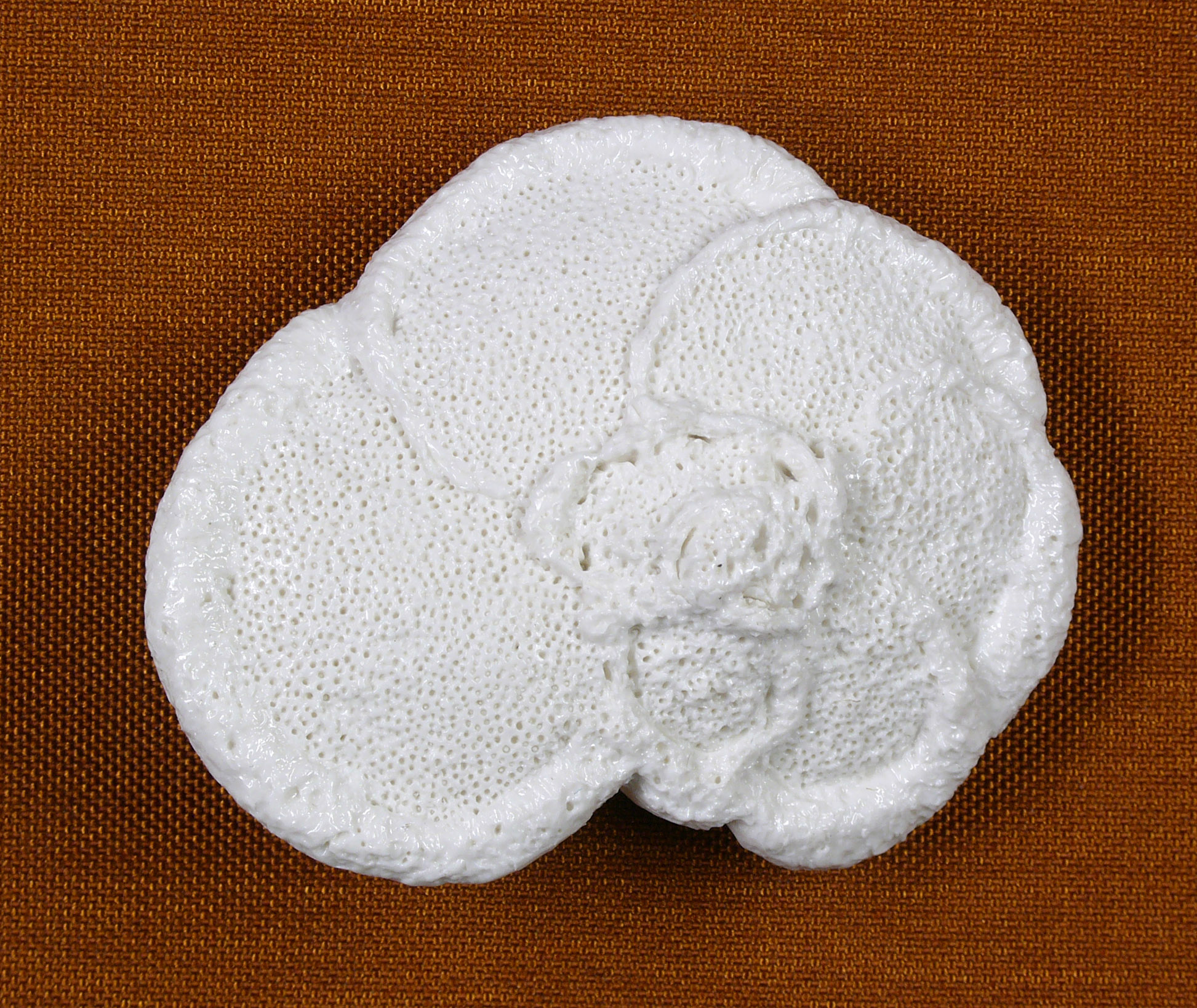

Scientific classification
- Domain: Eukaryota
- Clade: Sar
- Clade: Rhizaria
- Phylum: Retaria
- Subphylum: Foraminifera
- Class: Globothalamea
- Order: Rotaliida
- Family: Globorotaliidae
- Genus: Globorotalia
- Species: G. menardii

Binomial name
- Globorotalia menardii (d'Orbigny in Parker, Jones & Brady, 1865)

Subspecies and varieties
- Globorotalia menardii subsp. antarctica McCulloch, 1977 (taxon inquirendum); †Globorotalia menardii subsp. gibberula Bé, 1977; Globorotalia menardii subsp. jamesbayensis McCulloch, 1977 (taxon inquirendum); †Globorotalia menardii subsp. miotumida Jenkins, 1960; Globorotalia menardii var. fijiensis Cushman, 1934

Synonyms
- Discorbina sacharina Schwager, 1866 † (Opinion of Banner & Blow (1960)); Globorotalia cultrata (d'Orbigny, 1839) (Subjective junior synonym by Le Calvez (1977)); Globorotalia menardii var. fimbriata (Brady, 1884) (Opinion of Mikrotax); Pulvinulina menardi (d'Orbigny, 1826); Pulvinulina menardii var. fimbriata Brady, 1884; Pulvinulina repanda var. menardii (d'Orbigny, 1826); Rotalia (Rotalie) menardii d'Orbigny, 1826 (name not available. ICZN Art. 11 (b)(i): 11 (g): vernacular); Rotalia (Rotalie) nitida d'Orbigny, 1826 (name not available. ICZN Art. 11 (b)(i): 11 (g): vernacular); Rotalia menardii d'Orbigny, 1826 (Nomen nudum); Rotalia nitida d'Orbigny, 1826 (Nomen nudum); Rotalina (Rotalina) cultrata d'Orbigny, 1839 (Subjective junior synonym by Le Calvez (1977))

= Globorotalia menardii =

Globorotalia menardii Temporal range: Paleocene–Recent

Species of single-celled organism

Globorotalia menardii is a perforate foraminiferan, about 1 millimetre (0.04 in) in size. It is a single-celled animal large enough to be seen with a naked eye and is found in the fossil record back to the Paleocene.
