= Guadalupian =

Second series and epoch of the Permian

- 274.4 ± 0.4 – 259.51 ± 0.21 Ma
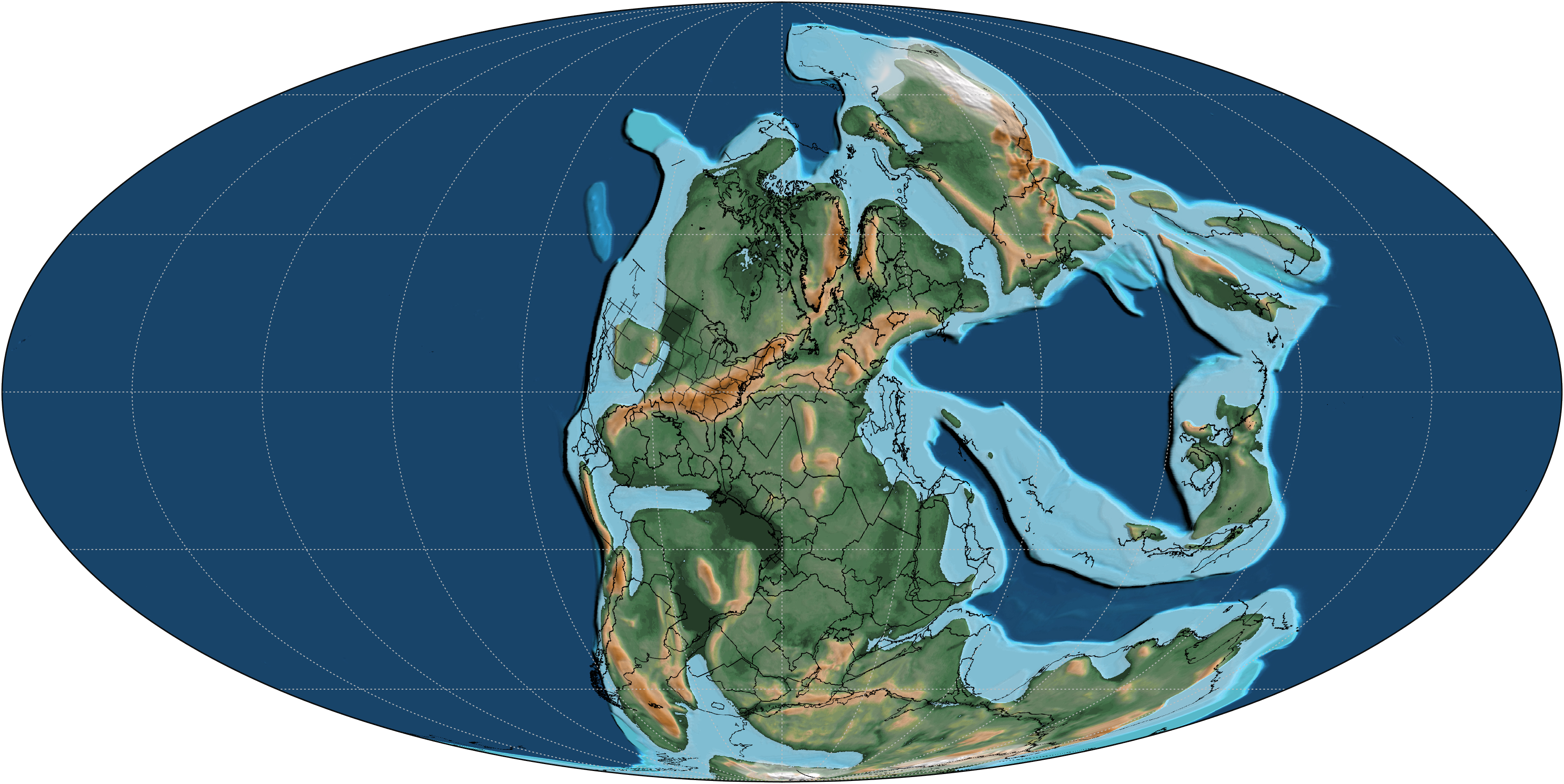
- A map of Earth as it appeared 265 million years ago during the Guadalupian Epoch, Wordian Age

Chronology
← / Permian-Triassic mass extinction event; ← / end-Capitanian extinction event; ← / Olson's Extinction
Subdivision of the Permian according to the ICS, as of 2023. Vertical axis scale: Millions of years ago

Etymology
- Name formality: Formal
- Name ratified: 1996

Usage information
- Celestial body: Earth
- Regional usage: Global (ICS)
- Time scale(s) used: ICS Time Scale

Definition
- Chronological unit: Epoch
- Stratigraphic unit: Series
- Time span formality: Formal
- Lower boundary definition: FAD of the Conodont Jinogondolella nanginkensis
- Lower boundary GSSP: Stratotype Canyon, Guadalupe Mountains, Texas, USA; 31.8767°N 104.8768°W
- Lower GSSP ratified: 2001
- Upper boundary definition: FAD of the Conodont Clarkina postbitteri postbitteri
- Upper boundary GSSP: Penglaitan Section, Laibin, Guangxi, China; 23.6953°N 109.3211°E
- Upper GSSP ratified: 2004

The Guadalupian is the second and middle series/epoch of the Permian. The Guadalupian was preceded by the Cisuralian and followed by the Lopingian. It is named after the Guadalupe Mountains of New Mexico and Texas, and dates between 274.4 ± 0.4 – 259.51 ± 0.21 Mya. The series saw the rise of the therapsids, a minor extinction event called Olson's Extinction and a significant mass extinction called the end-Capitanian extinction event. The Guadalupian is also known as the Middle Permian.

== Name and background ==
The Guadalupian is the second and middle series or epoch of the Permian. Previously called Middle Permian, the name of this epoch is part of a revision of Permian stratigraphy for standard global correlation. The name "Guadalupian" was first proposed in the early 1900s, and approved by the International Subcommission on Permian Stratigraphy in 1996. References to the Middle Permian still exist. The Guadalupian was preceded by the Cisuralian and followed by the Lopingian. It is named after the Guadalupe Mountains in Texas and New Mexico. The International Chronostratigraphic Chart V2021/07 provides a numerical age of 273.01 ± 0.14 – 259.51 ± 0.21 mya.

== Biodiversity ==
Therapsids became the dominant land animals in Guadalupian, displacing the pelycosaurs. Therapsids evolved from a group of pelycosaurs called sphenacodonts. Therapsida consists of four major clades: the dinocephalians, the herbivorous anomodonts, the carnivorous biarmosuchians, and the mostly carnivorous theriodonts. After a brief burst of evolutionary diversity, the dinocephalians died out in the later Guadalupian.

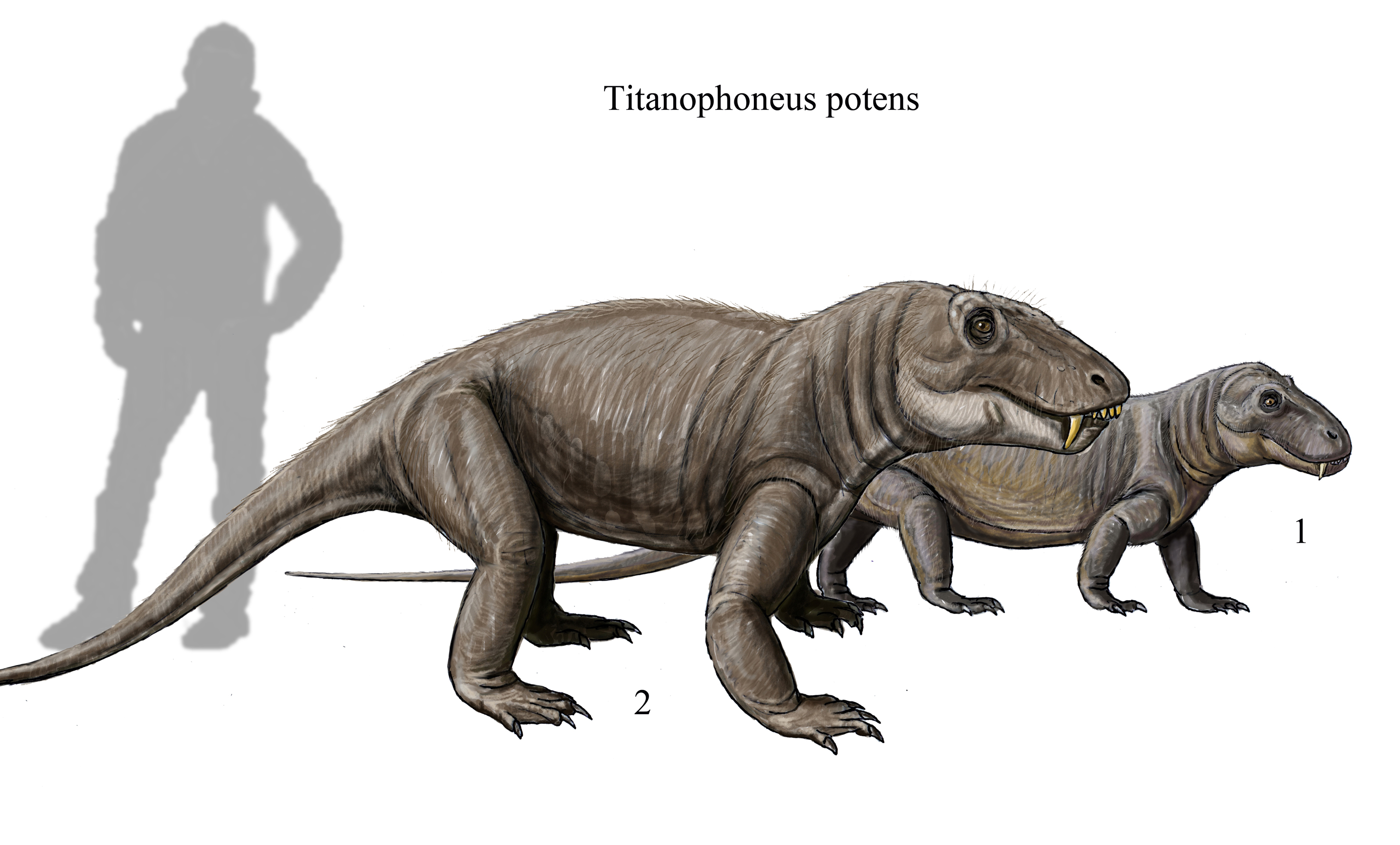
Titanophoneus, top of the food chain in the Guadalupian

A mass extinction occurred 273 million years ago in the early Guadalupian before the larger Permian–Triassic extinction event. This extinction was originally called Olson's Gap because it was thought to be a problem in preservation of fossils. Since the 1990s it has been renamed Olson's Extinction. This extinction event occurred near the beginning of the epoch and led to an extended period of low diversity when two-thirds of terrestrial vertebrate life was lost worldwide. Global diversity rose dramatically by the end probably the result of disaster taxa filling empty guilds, only to fall again when the end-Guadalupian event caused a diversity drop in the Wuchiapingian.

There is no agreed cause for the Olson's Extinction. Climate change may be a possible cause. Extreme environments were observed from the Permian of Kansas which resulted from a combination of hot climate and acidic waters particularly coincident with Olson's Extinction. Whether this climate change was a result of Earth's natural processes or exacerbated by another event is unknown.

== Climate ==
The climate resembled that of much of central Asia today. Pangea was a supercontinent and had very hot dry summers and cold bitter winters. At this time on the equator there was a desert that reached 74 degrees Celsius. The coasts were tropical and had monsoons.

The first two-thirds of the epoch were the continuation of a temperate and tropical climate. This started to dry out and the coal forming of the previous epoch stopped. The change in climate also provided a new environment for new tetrapods, reptiles, fish, plants, and invertebrates.

In the last third the temperature started to drop and many coral reefs died out. If that was not enough, increased volcano activity brought a reduction in oxygen, a greenhouse and mass extinction.

== Subdivisions ==
There are three stages in the guadalupian, they are the Roadian, Wordian, and Capitanian.

=== Roadian ===
The Roadian Stage was between 272.3 ± 0.5 – 268.8 ± 0.5 Mya.

Olson's Extinction was a worldwide loss of terrestrial vertebrate life that occurred during the Roadian and Wordian.

Fauna did not recover fully from Olson's Extinction before the impact of the Permian-Triassic extinction event. Estimates of recovery time vary, where some authors indicated recovery was prolonged, lasting 30 million years into the Triassic.

Several important events took place during Olson's Extinction, most notably the origin of therapsids, a group that includes the evolutionary ancestors of mammals. Further research on the recently identified primitive therapsid of the Xidagou Formation (Dashankou locality) in China of Roadian age may provide more information on this topic.

=== Wordian ===
The Wordian Stage was between 268.8 ± 0.5 – 265.1 ± 0.4 Mya.

The base of the Wordian Stage is defined as the place in the stratigraphic record where fossils of conodont species Jinogondolella aserrata first appear. The global reference profile for this stratigraphic boundary is located at Getaway Ledge in the Guadalupe Mountains of Texas.

The top of the Wordian (the base of the Capitanian Stage) is defined as the place in the stratigraphic record where the conodont species Jinogondolella postserrata first appears.

=== Capitanian ===
The Capitanian Stage was between 265.1 ± 0.4 – 259.8 ± 0.4 Mya.

The Guadalupian ended with a deteriorating environment, Greenhouse conditions, and several series of mass-extinctions; both the great dinocephalians, other taxa on land and various invertebrates in the sea. They would be succeeded by new types of therapsids, especially the gorgonopsians among others.

A significant mass extinction event (the End-Capitanian extinction event) occurred at the end of this epoch, which was associated with anoxia and acidification in the oceans and possibly caused by the volcanic eruptions that produced the Emeishan Traps. This extinction event may be related to the much larger Permian–Triassic extinction event that followed about 10 million years later.

Carbon isotopes in marine limestone from the Capitanian Age show an increase in δ^{13}C values. The change in carbon isotopes in the sea water reflects cooling of global climates.

This climatic cooling may have caused the end-Capitanian extinction event among species that lived in warm water, like larger fusulinids (Verbeekninidae), large bivalves (Alatoconchidae) and rugose corals, and Waagenophyllidae.

== Other subdivisions ==
Subdivisions that are sometimes used are,

- Kazanian or Maokovian (in Europe) [270.6 ± 0.7 – 260.4 ± 0.7 Mya]
- Braxtonian (in New Zealand) [270.6 ± 0.7 – 260.4 ± 0.7 Mya]
