= Calabrian stage =

Subdivision of the Pleistocene Epoch

Calabrian
- 1.80 – 0.774 Ma

Chronology
| ← / Holocene |
Subdivision of the Quaternary according to the ICS, as of 2024. Vertical axis scale: Millions of years ago

Etymology
- Name formality: Formal

Usage information
- Celestial body: Earth
- Regional usage: Global (ICS)
- Time scale(s) used: ICS Time Scale

Definition
- Chronological unit: Age
- Stratigraphic unit: Stage
- Time span formality: Formal
- Lower boundary definition: Approximately 8 m after the end of magnetic polarity chronozone C2n (Olduvai)
- Lower boundary GSSP: Vrica Section, Calabria, Italy; 39.0385°N 17.1348°E
- Lower GSSP ratified: 5 December 2011 (as base of Calabrian)
- Upper boundary definition: 1.1 m below the directional midpoint of the Brunhes-Matuyama magnetic reversal
- Upper boundary GSSP: Chiba, Japan; 35.2943°N 140.1465°E
- Upper GSSP ratified: 2020

Calabrian is a subdivision of the Pleistocene Epoch of the Quaternary period and the geologic time scale, defined as 1.8 Ma—774,000 years ago ± 5,000 years, a period of ~1.026 million years.

The end of the stage is defined by the last magnetic pole reversal (781 ± 5 Ka) and plunge into an ice age and global drying possibly colder and drier than the late Miocene (Messinian) through early Pliocene (Zanclean) cold period. Originally the Calabrian was defined as a European faunal stage primarily based on mollusk fossils. It has become the second geologic age in the Early Pleistocene.

== History of the definition of the Calabrian ==
Because sea shells are much more abundant as fossils, 19th- and early-20th-century geo-scientists used the plentiful and well-differentiable Mollusca (mollusks) and Brachiopods to identify stratigraphic boundaries. Thus the Calabrian was originally defined as an assemblage of mollusk fossils, most brachiopods being extinct by then. Efforts were then made to find the best representation of that assemblage in a stratigraphic section. By 1948 scientists used the initial appearance of cool-water (northern) invertebrate faunas in Mediterranean marine sediments as the beginning marker for the Calabrian. The 18th International Geological Congress in London (1948) placed the base of the Pleistocene at the base of the marine strata of the Calabrian Faunal Stage and denominated a type section in southern Italy. However, it was discovered that the original type section was discontinuous at that point and that the base of the Calabrian Stage as defined by fauna assemblages extended to earlier levels within the Pleistocene. A new type section was chosen, several miles from the original one, at Vrica, 4 km south of Crotone in Calabria, southern Italy. Analysis of strontium and oxygen isotopes as well as of planktonic foraminifera has confirmed the viability of the current type section. The 27th International Geological Congress in Moscow in 1984 formally ratified the type section. The starting date was originally thought to be about 1.65 million years ago, but has been recalculated as 1.806 Mya.

== Present formal definition ==
The Global Boundary Stratotype Section and Point, GSSP, for the former start of the Pleistocene is in a reference section at Vrica, 4 km south of Crotone in Calabria, Southern Italy, a location whose exact dating has recently been confirmed by analysis of strontium and oxygen isotopes as well as by planktonic foraminifera.

The beginning of the Calabrian hence is defined as: Just above top of magnetic polarity chronozone C2n (Olduvai) and the extinction level of calcareous nannofossil Discoaster brouweri (base Zone CN13). Above the boundary are the lowest occurrence of calcareous nannofossil medium Gephyrocapsa spp. and the extinction level of the planktonic foraminifer Globigerinoides extremus.

The end of the Calabrian is defined as the Brunhes–Matuyama magnetic reversal event.

== Palaeoclimate ==
Glacial cycles during the Calabrian were governed primarily by the 41-kyr obliquity cycle. The early Calabrian saw a significant aridification event in East Africa about 1.7 Ma, which is associated with a spread of C_{4} grasslands and a faunal turnover among mammals.

== See also ==
- Eburonian
- Villafranchian
