= Rupelian =

First Age of the Oligocene Epoch

- 33.9 – 27.30 Ma

Chronology
← / PETM; ← / First Antarctic permanent ice-sheets; ← / K-Pg mass extinction
Subdivision of the Paleogene according to the ICS, as of 2024. Vertical axis scale: Millions of years ago
- Formerly part of: Tertiary Period/System

Etymology
- Name formality: Formal

Usage information
- Celestial body: Earth
- Regional usage: Global (ICS)
- Time scale(s) used: ICS Time Scale

Definition
- Chronological unit: Age
- Stratigraphic unit: Stage
- Time span formality: Formal
- Lower boundary definition: LAD of Planktonic Foraminiferans Hantkenina and Cribrohantkenina
- Lower boundary GSSP: Massignano quarry section, Massignano, Ancona, Italy; 43.5328°N 13.6011°E
- Lower GSSP ratified: 1992
- Upper boundary definition: LAD of the Planktonic Foraminifer Chiloguembelina (Base of Foram Zone P21b)
- Upper boundary GSSP: Monte Cagnero, Central Apennines, Italy; 43.6466°N 13.4677°E
- Upper GSSP ratified: September 2016

The Rupelian, in the geologic timescale, the older of two ages or the lower of two stages of the Oligocene Epoch/Series. It spans the time between 33.9 and 27.3 Ma. It is preceded by the Priabonian Stage (part of the Eocene) and is followed by the Chattian Stage. The Rupelian is also known, informally, as the early Oligocene and lower Oligocene.

== Name ==
The stage is named after the small river Rupel in Belgium, a tributary to the Scheldt. The Belgian Rupel Group derives its name from the same source. The name Rupelian was introduced in scientific literature by Belgian geologist André Hubert Dumont in 1850. The separation between the group and the stage was made in the second half of the 20th century, when stratigraphers saw the need to distinguish between lithostratigraphic and chronostratigraphic names.

== Stratigraphic definition ==
The base of the Rupelian Stage (which is also the base of the Oligocene Series) is at the extinction of the foraminiferan genus Hantkenina. An official GSSP for the base of the Rupelian has been assigned in 1992 (Massignano, Italy). The transition with the Chattian has also been marked with a GSSP in August 2017 (Monte Conero, Italy).

The top of the Rupelian Stage (the base of the Chattian) is at the extinction of the foram genus Chiloguembelina (which is also the base of foram biozone P21b).

The Rupelian overlaps the Orellan, Whitneyan and lower Arikareean North American Land Mammal Ages, the upper Mustersan and Tinguirirican South American Land Mammal Ages, the uppermost Headonian, Suevian and lower Arvernian European Land Mammal Mega Zones (the Rupelian spans the Mammal Paleogene zones 21 through 24 and part of 25), and the lower Hsandgolian Asian Land Mammal Age. It is also coeval with the only regionally used upper Aldingan and lower Janjukian stages of Australia, the upper Refugian and lower Zemorrian stages of California and the lower Kiscellian Paratethys stage of Central and eastern Europe. Other regionally used alternatives include the Stampian, Tongrian, Latdorfian and Vicksburgian.
