= Harrisonian =

Period in geologic time

The Harrisonian North American Stage on the geologic timescale is the North American faunal stage according to the North American Land Mammal Ages chronology (NALMA), typically set from 24,800,000 to 20,600,000 years BP, a period of 4.2 million years. It is usually considered to overlap the Chattian and Aquitanian stages within the late Paleogene. The Harrisonian is preceded by the Monroecreekian and followed by the Hemingfordian NALMA stage.
