= Coumiac Formation =

Geologic formation in France

- Stratigraphic range: Devonian
- Type: Formation

Location
- Country: France

The Coumiac Formation is a geologic formation in France. It preserves fossils dated to the Devonian period.

The Global Boundary Stratotype Section and Point (GSSP) for the base of the Famennian Stage of the Devonian is located at Coumiac quarry (43.4705°N 3.0597°E) near Cessenon-sur-Orb.

== See also ==
- List of fossiliferous stratigraphic units in France
