= Jinogondolella =

Jinogondolella Temporal range: Kungurian–Capitanian

Scientific classification
- Kingdom: Animalia
- Phylum: Chordata
- Infraphylum: Agnatha
- Class: †Conodonta
- Order: †Ozarkodinida
- Family: †Gondolellidae
- Genus: †Jinogondolella; Mei and Wardlaw 1994

Species
- †Jinogondolella aserrata; †Jinogondolella nanginkensis; †Jinogondolella postserrata

Extinct genus of jawless fishes

Jinogondolella is an extinct genus of conodonts.

== Use in stratigraphy ==
The top of the Kungurian (the base of the Roadian and the Guadalupian series) is defined as the place in the stratigraphic record where fossils of the species Jinogondolella nanginkensis first appeared.

The base of the Wordian stage is defined as the place in the stratigraphic record where fossils of the species Jinogondolella aserrata first appeared. The global reference profile for this stratigraphic boundary is located at Getaway Ledge in the Guadalupe Mountains of Texas.

The base of the Capitanian stage is defined as the place in the stratigraphic record where fossils of the species Jinogondolella postserrata first appeared. The global reference profile for this stratigraphic boundary is located at Nipple Hill in the southern Guadalupe Mountains of Texas.
