= Famennian =

Final stage of the Devonian

- 372.15 ± 0.46 – 358.86 ± 0.19 Ma
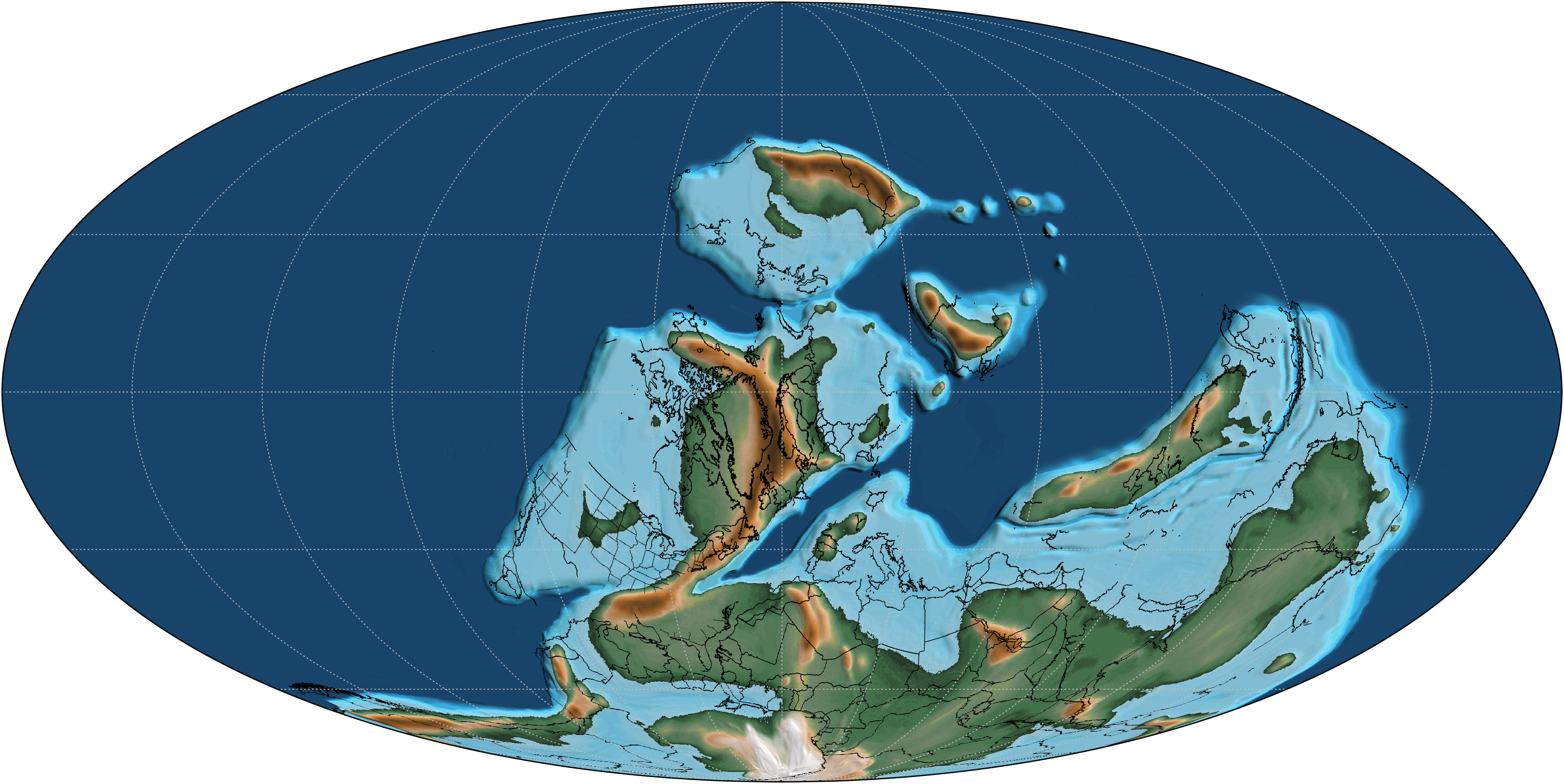
- Paleogeography of the Famennian, 370 Ma

Chronology
← / Hangenberg event, Famennian glaciation; ← / Kellwasser event (Late Devonian mass extinction); ← / Widespread shrubs & trees; ← / Hunsrück fauna; ← / Rhynie chert
Subdivision of the Devonian according to the ICS, as of 2024; Vertical axis scale: Millions of years ago

Etymology
- Name formality: Formal

Usage information
- Celestial body: Earth
- Regional usage: Global (ICS)
- Time scale(s) used: ICS Time Scale

Definition
- Chronological unit: Age
- Stratigraphic unit: Stage
- Time span formality: Formal
- Lower boundary definition: FAD of the conodont Palmatolepis subperlobata LAD of the conodont Palmatolepis bogartensis
- Lower boundary GSSP: Coumiac quarry, Montagne Noire, France; 43.4613°N 3.0403°E
- Lower GSSP ratified: 1993
- Upper boundary definition: FAD of the conodont Siphonodella sulcata (discovered to have biostratigraphic issues as of 2006).
- Upper boundary GSSP: La Serre, Montagne Noire, France; 43.5555°N 3.3573°E
- Upper GSSP ratified: 1990

The Famennian is the later of two faunal stages in the Late Devonian epoch. The most recent estimate for its duration is that it lasted from 372.15 million years ago to 358.86 million years ago. It was preceded by the Frasnian stage and followed by the Tournaisian stage.

== Major events ==
In the seas, a novel major group of ammonoid cephalopods called clymeniids appeared, underwent tremendous diversification and spread worldwide, then just as suddenly went extinct.

The beginning of the Famennian is marked by the final stages of a major extinction event, the Kellwasser Event, which is the largest component of the Late Devonian mass extinction. The end of the Famennian experiences a smaller but still quite severe extinction event, the Hangenberg Event. A brief episode of glaciation, possibly linked to the Hangenberg event, occurred during the late Famennian, the first in a series of short glaciations that preceded the Late Palaeozoic ice age of the Carboniferous and Permian periods.

== Subdivisions ==
The International Commission on Stratigraphy divides the Famennian into four informal substages based primarily on conodont zonation. The Famennian corresponds to four historical subdivisions in German stratigraphy: the Nehdenian, Hembergian, Dasbergian, and Wocklumian (from oldest to youngest). However, these are based solely on ammonoid zonation and do not precisely correspond to the informal ICS subdivisions. The Uppermost Famennian substage (approximating the Wocklumian) is also known as the Strunian in the Ardennes region.

North American subdivisions of the Famennian include the Chautauquan, Canadaway, Conneaut, Conneautan, Conewango and Conewangan.

== Name and definition ==
The Famennian Stage was proposed in 1855 by Belgian geologist André Hubert Dumont and was accepted for the upper stage of the Upper Devonian by the Subcommission on Devonian Stratigraphy in 1981. It is named after Famenne, a natural region in southern Belgium. The lower GSSP, ratified in 1993, is located within the Coumiac Formation near Cessenon in southern France.

Since 2017, the base of the Famennian has been defined by a distinctive turnover of conodonts, particularly the last appearance of Palmatolepis bogartensis, the first appearance of Palmatolepis subperlobata, and an increase in the abundance of Palmatolepis ultima. It was previously defined by the start of the Palmatolepis triangularis conodont zone, but later studies showed that P. triangularis first appeared slightly later than the main conodont turnover in the GSSP.

A 2012 ICS timescale based on rough radioisotopic records estimated the Famennian began around 372.2 ± 1.6 Ma, and ended at 358.9 ± 0.4 Ma. In 2020 this was revised to a start at 371.1 ± 1.1 Ma and an end at 359.3 ± 0.3 Ma.

== See also ==
- List of fossil sites (with link directory)
