= North Greenland Ice Core Project =

Ice drilling site near the center of Greenland

Coordinates: 75°01′N 42°32′W

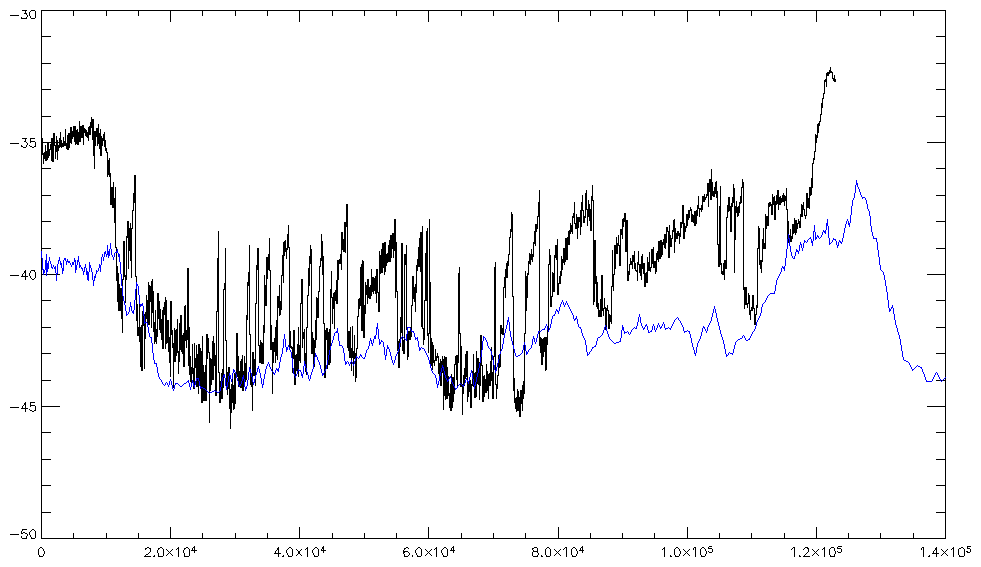
Delta-O-18 record from the NGRIP core

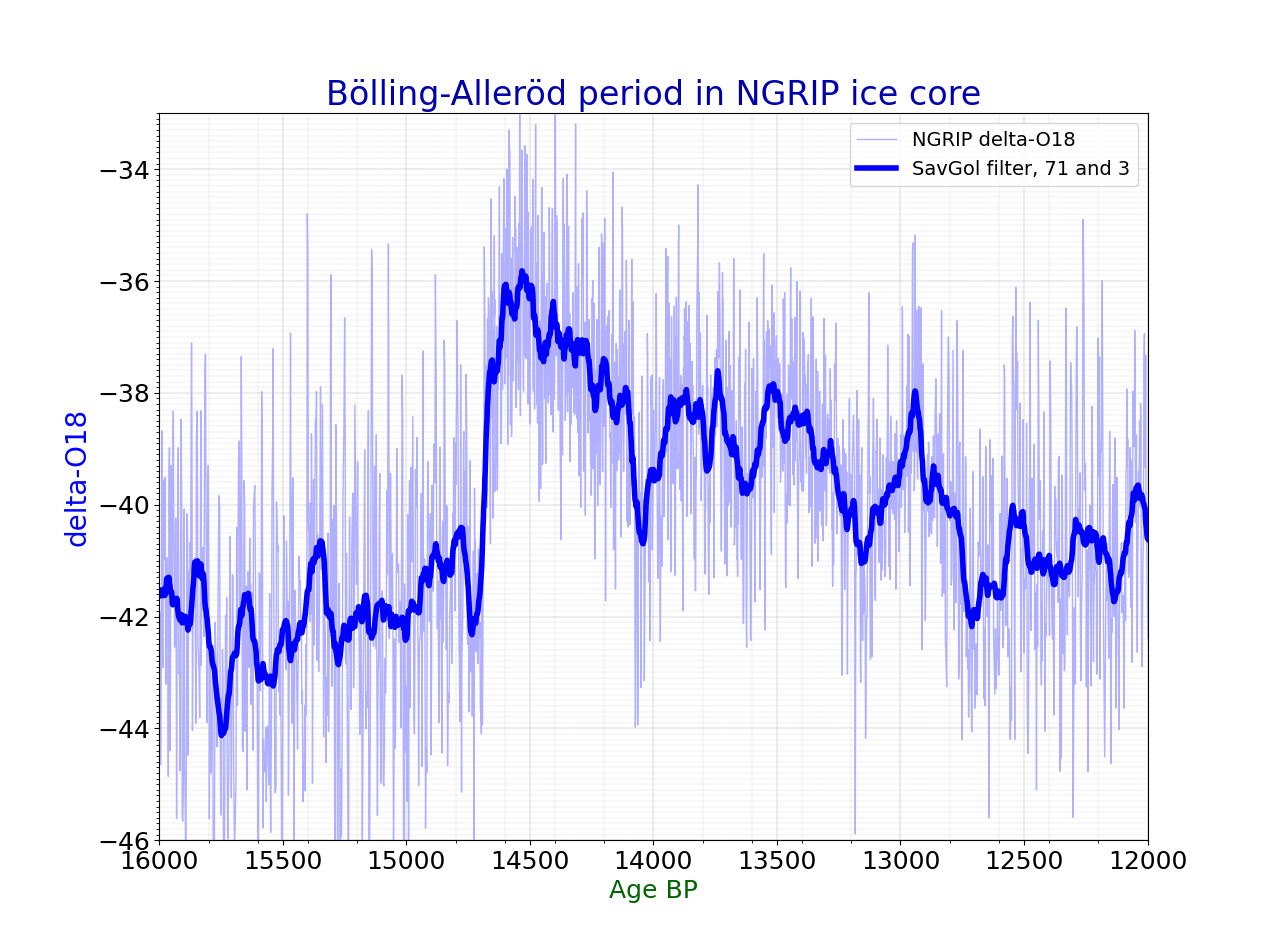
North Greenland Ice Core Project Oxygen Isotope Data

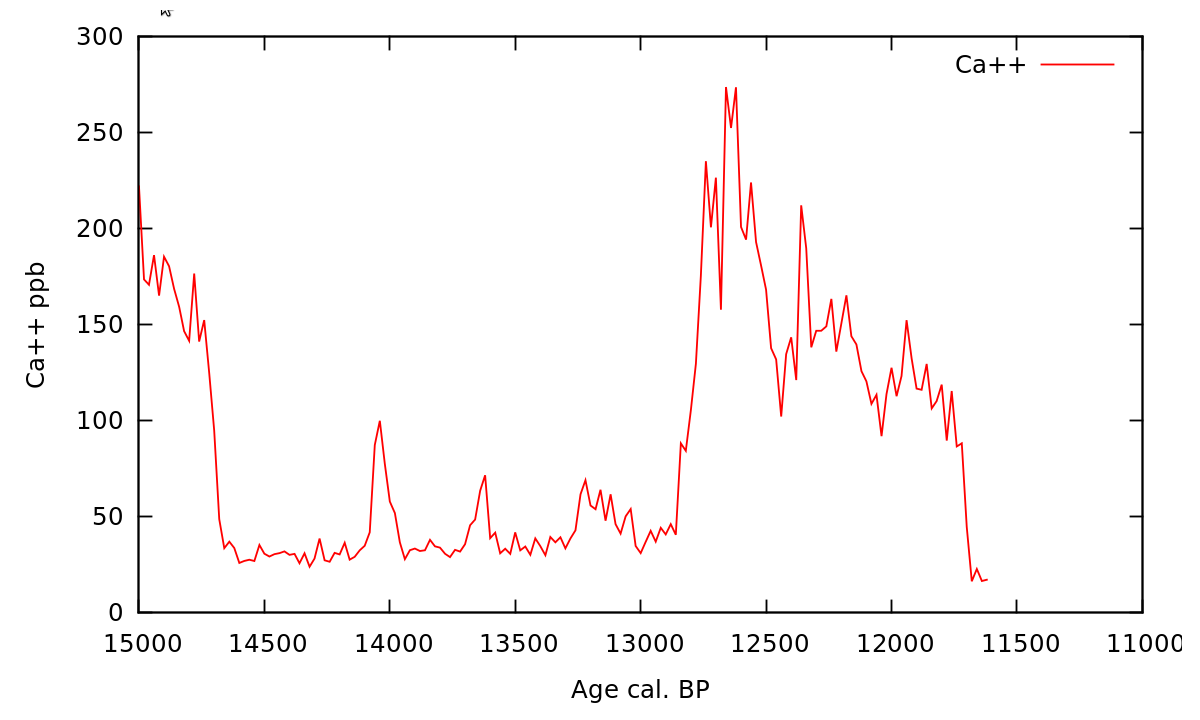
Calcium concentration and d18O isotope ratios from the Greenland NGRIP, GRIP, and GISP2 ice cores on the GICC05 time scale

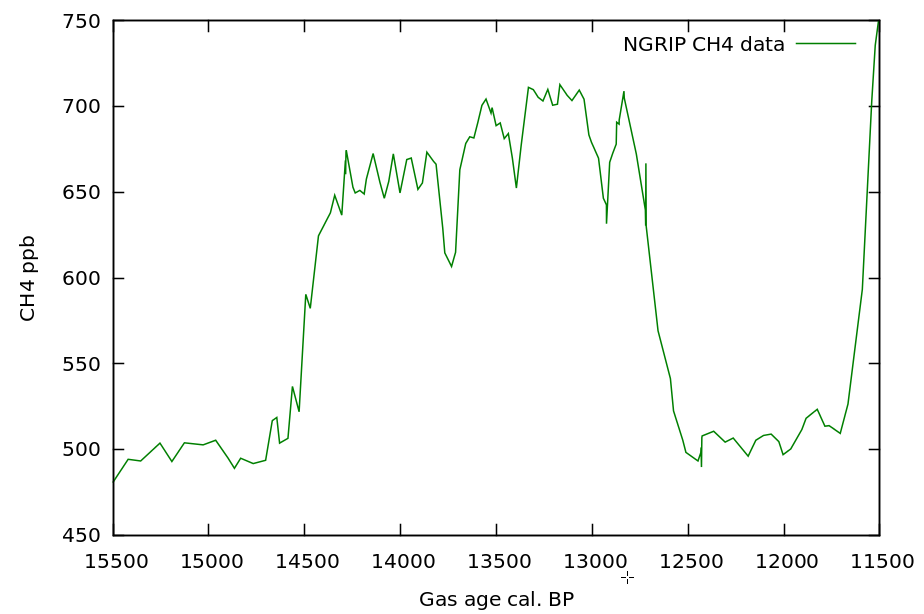
Methane (CH4) record from the North Greenland Ice Sheet Project (NGRIP) ice core, Greenland

The drilling site of the North Greenland Ice Core Project (NGRIP or NorthGRIP) is near the center of Greenland (75.1 N, 42.32 W, 2917 m, ice thickness 3085 meters). Drilling began in 1999 and was completed at bedrock in 2003. The cores are cylinders of ice 11 centimeters in diameter that were brought to the surface in 3.5-meter lengths. The NGRIP site was chosen to extract a long and undisturbed record stretching into the last glacial, and it succeeded. The site was chosen for a flat basal topography to avoid the flow distortions that render the bottom of the GRIP and GISP cores unreliable. Unusually, there is melting at the bottom of the NGRIP core – believed to be due to a high geothermal heat flux locally. This has the advantage that the bottom layers are less compressed by thinning than they would otherwise be: NGRIP annual layers at 10.5 kyr age are 1.1 cm thick, twice the GRIP thicknesses at equal age.

The NGRIP record helps to resolve a problem with the GRIP and GISP2 records – the unreliability of the Eemian Stage portion of the record. NGRIP covers 5 kyr of the Eemian, and shows that temperatures then were roughly as stable as the pre-industrial Holocene temperatures were. This is confirmed by sediment cores, in particular MD95-2042.

In 2003, NGRIP recovered what seem to be plant remnants approximately 3,200 metres (10,400 ft) below the surface, and they may be several million years old.

"Several of the pieces look very much like blades of grass or pine needles," said University of Colorado at Boulder geological sciences Professor James White, an NGRIP principal investigator. "If confirmed, this will be the first organic material ever recovered from a deep ice-core drilling project," he said.

== See also ==
- Bølling–Allerød warming
- Greenlandian
- Northgrippian
