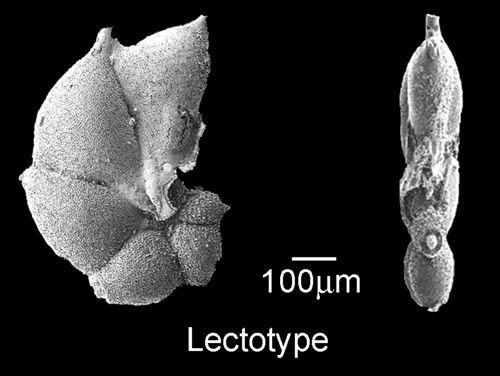
- Hantkenina dumblei

Scientific classification
- Domain: Eukaryota
- Clade: Sar
- Clade: Rhizaria
- Phylum: Retaria
- Subphylum: Foraminifera
- Class: Globothalamea
- Order: Rotaliida
- Family: †Hantkeninidae
- Genus: †Hantkenina; Cushman, 1924

Species
- †Hantkenina singaoa; †Hantkenina mexicana; †Hantkenina liebusi; †Hantkenina lehneri; †Hantkenina dumblei; †Hantkenina austrailis; †Hantkenina compressa; †Hantkenina primitiva; †Hantkenina alabamensis; †Hantkenina nanggulanensis; †Cribrohantkenina inflata

= Hantkenina =

Hantkenina Temporal range: 49–33.7 Ma

Extinct genus of foraminifers

Hantkenina is a genus of planktonic foraminifera that lived from the Middle Eocene up to late Eocene, circa 49 Ma-33.9 Ma. There have been 11 morphospecies described, including one of Cribrohantkenina

== Description ==
Hantkenina is a genus of foraminifera. Hantkeninids are well-known biostratigraphic index fossils. They produce a test ("shell") of calcite (CaCO_{3}). Hantkeninids evolved from Clavigerinella caucasica. Hantkenina is highly distinctive from other planktonic foraminifers as they are characterized by planispiral coiling and their hollow, slender extensions of each chamber known as tubulospines.

The structure of this unique feature vary between individuals, and between species of hantkenina. All hantkeninas species retained tubulospines through their evolution. This indicates that it served a useful purpose for this particular form of foraminifera. The function of the tubulospines are unknown, however, reproduction and feeding purposes have been suggested as possible functions.

== Paleoecology ==
The first hantkenids (Hantkenina mexicana) lived in deep planktonic environments with minimum oxygen levels. However, isotopes suggests they migrated to fully oxygenated shallower waters at about 43.8 Ma. During the Eocene the climate went through climate changes. The peak of the Cenozoic warmth occurred during the Early Eocene. Afterwards, global cooling began, persisting to Early Oligocene. The first large ice caps appeared in Antarctica during this time. This climate change also affected deep-water environments.

The cooling process caused gradual changes in the structure of the water column. As the water cooled, the rates of remineralization of organic matter at the near surface water altered. A consequence of this global cooling was that bacterial metabolic rates at the upper water column slowed down and allowed sinking organic matter to descend further to deeper environments in the ocean. This made the oxygen minimum zone, less intense and more spread out. New niches for deep-dwelling zooplankton that were able to tolerate low levels of oxygen opened up. Pearson and Coxall (2013) speculate that the evolution of Clavigerinella and Hantkenina was related to this global cooling, as well as pulses of deep-water anoxia
