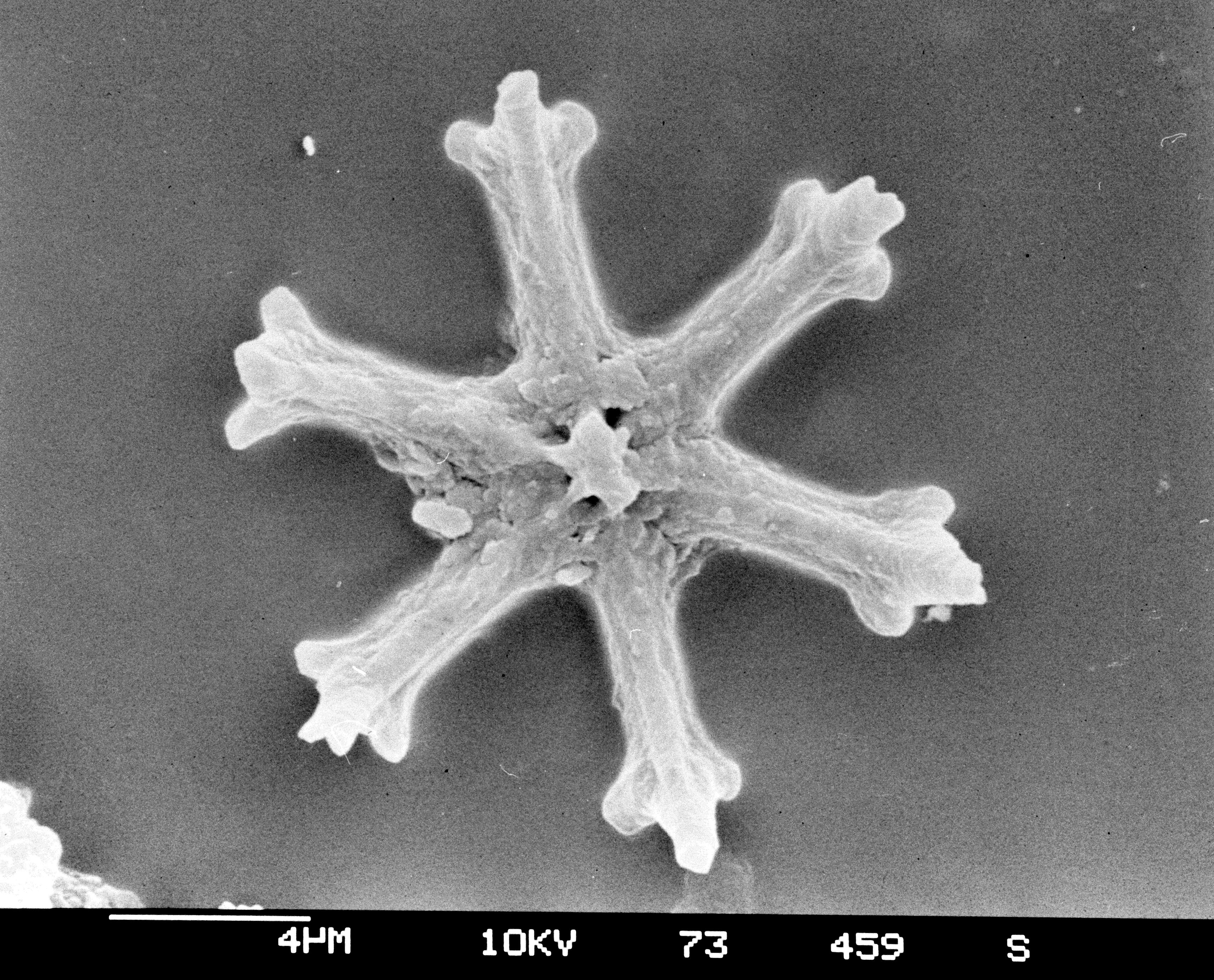
- Discoaster surculus, about 15 μm across

Scientific classification
- Domain: Eukaryota
- Clade: Haptista
- Division: Haptophyta
- Class: Prymnesiophyceae
- Order: †Discoasterales
- Family: †Discoasteraceae
- Genus: †Discoaster; S.H. Tan, 1931

= Discoaster =

Discoaster Temporal range: Paleocene –Pleistocene Most abundant during Miocene

Extinct genus of single-celled organisms

Discoaster is a genus of extinct star-shaped marine algae, with calcareous exoskeletons of between 5-40 μm across that are abundant as nanofossils in tropical deep-ocean deposits of Neogene age. Discoaster belongs to the haptophytes. About 100 species can be recognized.

== Biostratigraphic significance ==
The International Commission on Stratigraphy (ICS) has assigned the extinction of Discoaster brouweri as the defining biological marker for the start of the Calabrian Stage of the Pleistocene, 1.806 million years ago. ICS has assigned the extinction of Discoaster pentaradiatus and Discoaster surculus as the defining biological marker for the start of the Gelasian Stage, 2.588 million years ago, the earliest stage of the Pleistocene. ICS further assigned the extinction of Discoaster kugleri as biological marker for the start of the Tortonian Stage of the Miocene, 11.62 million years ago.

== Species ==
Some species in this genus include:

Discoaster
Species	Authority
D. asymmetricus	Gartner
D. bellus	Bukry & Percival
D. berggrenii	Bukry
D. bollii	Martini & Bramlette
D. brouweri	Bramlette & Riedel
D. calcaris	Gartner
D. exilis	Martini & Bramlette
D. hamatus	Martini & Bramlette
D. intercalaris	Bukry
D. kugleri	Martini & Bramlette (1963)
D. loeblichii	Bukry
D. neohamatus	Bukry & Bramlette
D. neorectus	Bukry
D. pentaradiatus	(Tan, 1931) Bramlette & Riedel
D. quintatus	Gartner
D. surculus	Martini & Bramlette
D. toralus	Ellis, Lohmann, & Wray
D. triradiatus	Tan (1931)
D. variabilis	Martini & Bramlette
D. arneyi	—
