= Aquitanian age =

Oldest age in the Miocene

Aquitanian
- 23.04 – 20.45 Ma

Chronology
← / Messinian salinity crisis; ← / North American prairie expands
Subdivision of the Neogene according to the ICS, as of 2024. Vertical axis scale: Millions of years ago
- Formerly part of: Tertiary Period/System

Usage information
- Celestial body: Earth
- Regional usage: Global (ICS)
- Time scale(s) used: ICS Time Scale

Definition
- Chronological unit: Age
- Stratigraphic unit: Stage
- Time span formality: Formal
- Lower boundary definition: Base of magnetic polarity chronozone C6Cn.2n; FAD of the Planktonic foraminiferan Paragloborotalia kugleri
- Lower boundary GSSP: Lemme-Carrosio Section, Carrosio, Italy; 44.6589°N 8.8364°E
- Lower GSSP ratified: 1996
- Upper boundary definition: Not formally defined
- Upper boundary definition candidates: Near FAD of the Planktonic Foraminiferan Globigerinoides altiaperturus; Near top of magnetic polarity chronozone C6An
- Upper boundary GSSP candidate section(s): Astronomically tuned ODP-core

The Aquitanian is, in the International Commission on Stratigraphy's (ICS) geologic timescale, the oldest age or lowest stage in the Miocene. It spans the time between 23.03 Ma and 20.44 Ma (million years ago) during the Early Miocene. It was a dry, cooling period. The Aquitanian succeeds the Chattian (the youngest age of the Oligocene) and precedes the Burdigalian.

The Aquitanian Age overlaps with the Harrisonian, Agenian, Pareora, Landon, Otaian, and Waitakian Ages from various regional timescales.

== Stratigraphic definition ==
The Aquitanian Stage was named after the Aquitaine region in France, and was introduced in scientific literature by Swiss stratigrapher Karl Mayer-Eymar in 1858.

The base of the Aquitanian (also the base of the Miocene Series and the Neogene System) is defined as the place in the stratigraphic column at the first appearance of foram species Paragloborotalia kugleri, the extinction of calcareous nanoplankton species Reticulofenestra bisecta (which forms the base of nanoplankton biozone NN1), and the base of magnetic chronozone C6Cn.2n. The official GSSP for the Aquitanian Stage lies in the Lemme-Carrosio section near the small village of Carrosio (north of Genoa) in northern Italy.

The top of the Aquitanian Stage (the base of the Burdigalian) is at the first appearance of foram species Globigerinoides altiaperturus and the top of magnetic chronozone C6An.
