= Serravallian =

Age or a stage in the middle Miocene Epoch

- 13.82 – 11.63 Ma

Chronology
| ← / Messinian salinity crisis; ← / North American prairie expands |
Subdivision of the Neogene according to the ICS, as of 2024. Vertical axis scale: Millions of years ago
- Formerly part of: Tertiary Period/System

Etymology
- Geochronological name: Formal

Usage information
- Celestial body: Earth
- Regional usage: Global (ICS)
- Time scale(s) used: ICS Time Scale

Definition
- Chronological unit: Age
- Stratigraphic unit: Stage
- Time span formality: Formal
- Lower boundary definition: Mi3b Oxygen-isotopic event (Global cooling episode)
- Lower boundary GSSP: Ras il Pellegrin section, Fomm ir-Riħ Bay, Malta; 35.9139°N 14.3361°E
- Lower GSSP ratified: 2007
- Upper boundary definition: LAD of the Haptophyte Discoaster kugleri
- Upper boundary GSSP: Monte dei Corvi Beach section, Ancona, Italy; 43.5867°N 13.5694°E
- Upper GSSP ratified: 2003

The Serravallian is, in the geologic timescale, an age or a stage in the middle Miocene Epoch/Series, which spans the time between 13.82 Ma and 11.63 Ma (million years ago). The Serravallian follows the Langhian and is followed by the Tortonian.

It overlaps with the middle of the Astaracian European Land Mammal Mega Zone, the upper Barstovian and lower Clarendonian North American Land Mammal Ages and the Laventan and lower Mayoan South American Land Mammal Ages. It is also coeval with the Sarmatian and upper Badenian Stages of the Paratethys time scale of Central and eastern Europe.

== Definition ==
The Serravallian Stage was introduced in stratigraphy by the Italian geologist Lorenzo Pareto in 1865. It was named after the town of Serravalle Scrivia in northern Italy.

The base of the Serravallian is at the first occurrence of fossils of the nannoplankton species Sphenolithus heteromorphus and is located in the chronozone C5ABr. The official Global Boundary Stratotype Section and Point (GSSP) for the Serravallian is in the 'Ras il-Pellegrin' section, located at the 'Ras il-Pellegrin' headland in the vicinity of 'Fomm ir-Rih' Bay, SW Malta.The base of the Serravallian is represented in the field as the formation boundary between the Globigerina Limestone formation and the Blue Clay formation. The base of the Serravallian is related to the Mi3b oxygen isotope excursion marking the onset of the Middle Miocene Cooling step.

The top of the Serravallian (the base of the Tortonian Stage) is at the last common appearance of calcareous nannoplanktons Discoaster kugleri and planktonic foram Globigerinoides subquadratus. It is also associated with the short normal-polarized chronozone C5r.2n.

== Palaeoclimate ==
During the Serravallian, Namibia experienced a humid climate marked by stability, with little impact from Antarctic glacial evolution.

== Palaeontology ==
=== Cartilaginous fish ===
- Lamniformes
  - Otodontidae: †Otodus

=== Birds ===
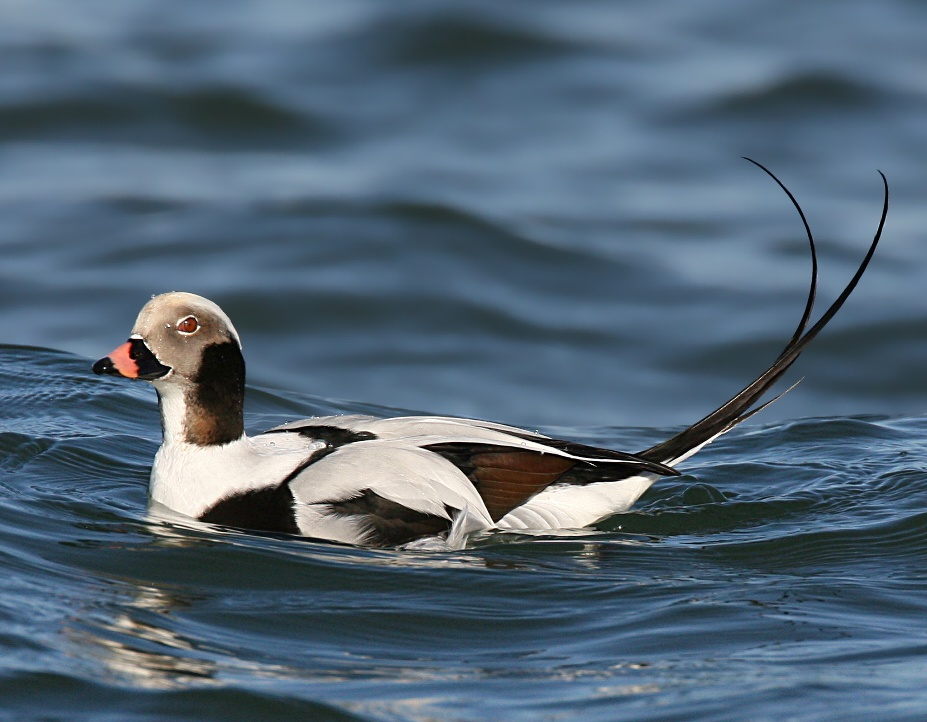
Ancestors of the long-tailed duck have been found dating from the Serravalian of Hungary

- Anseriformes
  - Anatidae: Clangula sp.

=== Mammals ===
- Primates
  - Hominidae: †Anoiapithecus

=== Reptiles ===
- Squamata
  - Agamidae: Pogona and Diporiphora diverged from their last common ancestor during the Serravallian.
- Crocodylomorpha
  - The last known sebecid, Barinasuchus, goes extinct about 11.8 mya. Thus ending the lineage of the notosuchians.
