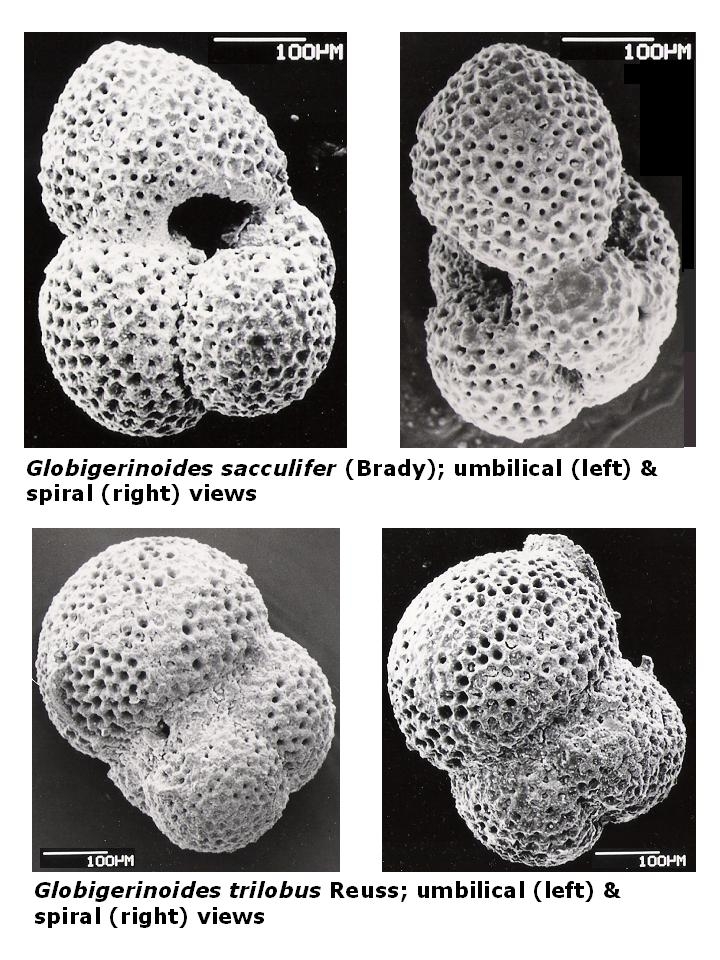
- UPPER PICTURE: Globigerinoides sacculifer (BRADY); LOWER PICTURE: Globigerinoides trilobus REUSS; Late Pliocene (Baja California, Mexico)

Scientific classification
- Domain: Eukaryota
- Clade: Sar
- Clade: Rhizaria
- Phylum: Retaria
- Subphylum: Foraminifera
- Class: Globothalamea
- Order: Rotaliida
- Family: Globigerinidae
- Subfamily: Globigerininae
- Genus: Globigerinoides; Cushman, 1927

Type species
- Globigerina rubra d'Orbigny, 1839

Species
- Globigerinoides altiaperturus Globigerinoides apertasuturalis Globigerinoides bispherica Globigerinoides bisphericus Globigerinoides conglobatus Globigerinoides elongatus Globigerinoides gomitulus Globigerinoides hyalinus Globigerinoides inusitatus Globigerinoides minuta Globigerinoides pyramidalis Globigerinoides quadrilobatus Globigerinoides ruber Globigerinoides sacculifer Globigerinoides sicanus Globigerinoides tenella Globigerinoides trilobus

= Globigerinoides =

Genus of single-celled organisms

Globigerinoides is an extant genus of shallow-water planktonic foraminifera of family Globigerinidae. First appearing in the Oligocene, these foraminifera are found in all modern oceans. Species of this genus occupy the euphotic zone, generally at depths between 10 and 50 m, in waters which cover a range of salinities and temperatures. They are a shorter lived species, especially when compared to Globorotalia genus. As a genus, Globigerinoides is widely used in various fields of research including biostratigraphy, isotope geochemistry, biogeochemistry, climatology, and oceanography.

== Morphology ==
The foraminifera of genus Globigerinoides are all shallow-water species with spinose forms made of hyaline calcite. Most species have trochospiral chamber arrangement, though some species exhibit further complexity with streptospiral chamber arrangement. Tests are composed of thin perforated walls, with very large pores, and spines being added at the end of individual chamber formation. Certain species are known to produce a modified type of calcium carbonate, ^{18}O enriched-gametogenic calcite, at the end of their life cycle. Prior to gametogenesis and the production of the final calcite layer, the spines are reabsorbed by the foraminifera leaving behind a test that is heavily calcified, and shows the remnants of spine holes. As with other amoeboids these foraminifera utilize pseudopodia. Pseudopodia are widely used throughout their entire lifecycle for various purposes including feeding, movement, protection, and chamber formation.

== Symbionts ==
Many Globigerinoides species bear photosynthetic symbiotic algae. The relationship between the symbiotic algae and its host foraminifera provides the host with at least three main advantages, including energy from photosynthesis, an enhancement of calcification, and uptake of host metabolites. All in all it is a prime example of ectosymbiosis. For those species that bear symbiotic algae, experiments have shown that their symbionts play a hugely important role in the success of individual foraminifera. Experiments using Globigerinoides sacculifer found that the life cycle of individuals is severely shorted when the symbionts photosynthetic cycle is disrupted or stopped (via darkness or removal of symbionts).

== Notable species ==
Certain species of Globigerinoides are more commonly used in various types of research than others. Commonly used species include G. ruber,G. sacculifer, G. subquadratus, and G. altiaperturus.

=== Globigerinoides sacculifer ===
Globigerinoides sacculifer exhibits two different morphologies, known as G. sacculifer with sac and G. sacculifer without sac. The sac feature is a sac shaped terminal chamber that is formed prior to the production of the gametogenic calcite. When using G. sacculifer tests for bulk isotope analysis tests without the sac morphology are often preferentially selected. G. sacculifer is also notable for certain in vivo experiments that have been conducted on it. It was found that individuals of this species are able to reconstruct their tests after injury when subjected to slight crushing in a laboratory setting. These repaired tests would often have nonstandard morphologies.

=== Globigerinoides ruber ===
Globigerinoides ruber are carnivorous and prey upon copepods and nauplii. Once a copepod or nauplii is caught in its spines G. ruber uses its pseudopodia to draw the caught prey close to its test to allow it to feed. Also notable about G. ruber is its two morphologies, a form with pink tests, and a form with whitish tests. White test individuals are found today in warm to temperate climate zones of the Atlantic, Pacific, and Indian Oceans, where as pink tested G. ruber is now only found in the Atlantic Ocean. It is unknown why the pink individuals are no longer found in the Pacific and Indian Oceans, but this variety disappeared from those oceans ~120,000 yr.G. ruber has been found to tolerate hyposaline waters, in laboratory cultures it was able to remain alive in salinity ranges of 22-49%.

=== Globigerinoides subquadratus ===
Among other microfossil evidence, the last common occurrence of G. subquadratus is defined as the beginning of the Tortonian stage of the geologic time scale. The boundary is defined at the Monte dei Corvi Beach section in Italy.

=== Globigerinoides altiaperturus ===
The first appearance datum of G. altiaperturus is the proposed base of the Burdigalian stage of the geologic time scale. The boundary has not yet been defined with a GSSP by the International Commission on Stratigraphy.
