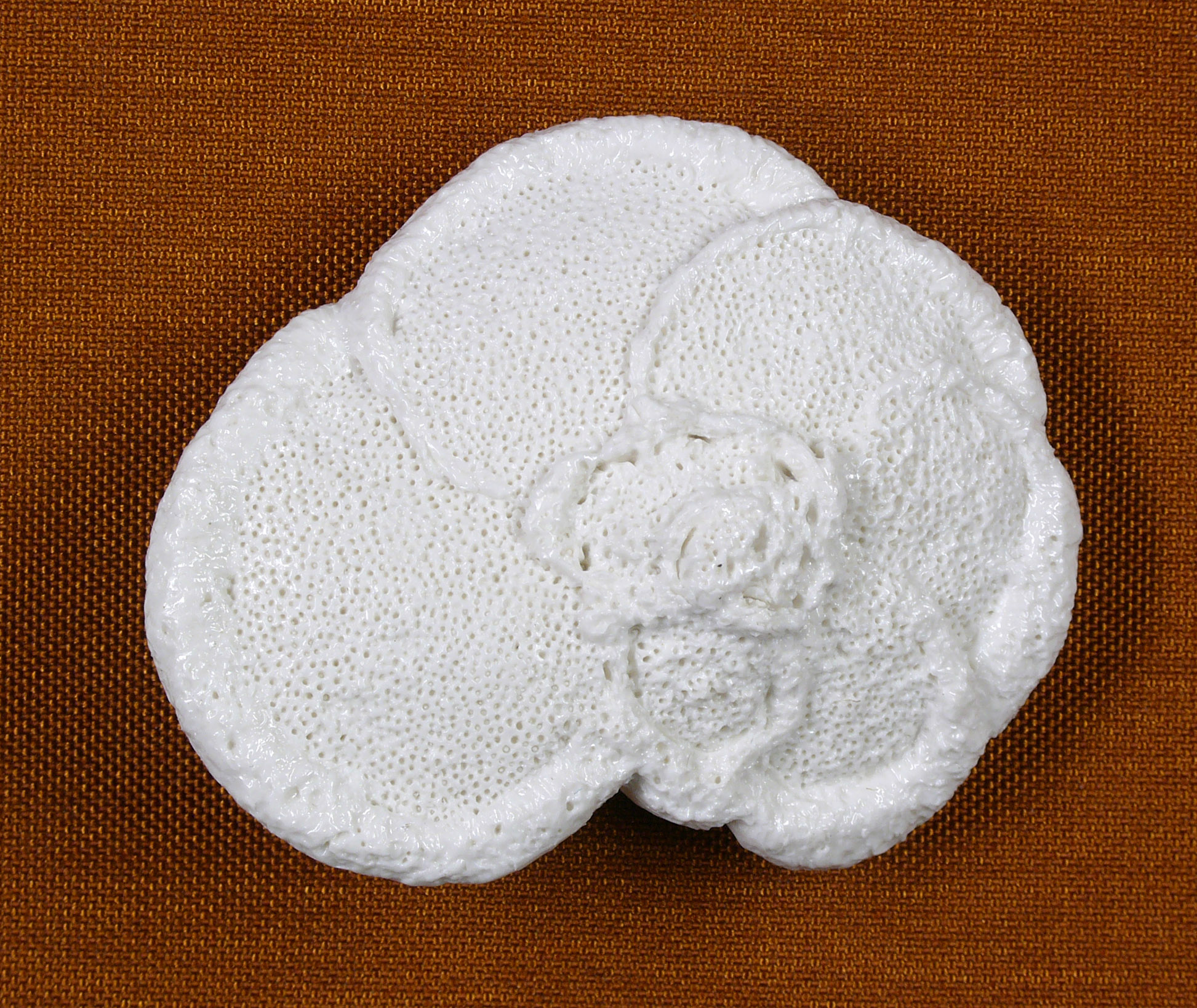
- Globorotalia menardii

Scientific classification
- Domain: Eukaryota
- Supergroup: Rhizaria
- Phylum: Foraminifera
- Class: Globothalamea
- Order: Rotaliida
- Family: Globorotaliidae
- Genus: Globorotalia; Cushman, 1927

= Globorotalia =

Genus of foraminifers

Globorotalia is a genus of foraminifers belonging to the family Globorotaliidae. It is a single-celled protist large enough to be seen with a naked eye and is found in the fossil record back to the Paleocene. It is deep-dwelling planktonic foraminifers that inhabit the top few hundred meters of the ocean and constitute potential recorders of thermocline conditions. The genus has cosmopolitan distribution.

== Species ==
Species:

- Globorotalia adamantea Saito, 1963
- Globorotalia akersi Snyder, 1975
- Globorotalia alamedillensis Martinez Gallego, 1977
- Globorotalia menardii d'Orbigny, 1826
