= Gelasian =

Earliest subdivision of the Quaternary Period

- 2.58 – 1.80 Ma

Chronology
← / Holocene
Subdivision of the Quaternary according to the ICS, as of 2024. Vertical axis scale: Millions of years ago
- Formerly part of: Tertiary Period/System; Pliocene Epoch/Series

Etymology
- Name formality: Formal
- Name ratified: August 1996

Usage information
- Celestial body: Earth
- Regional usage: Global (ICS)
- Time scale(s) used: ICS Time Scale

Definition
- Chronological unit: Age
- Stratigraphic unit: Stage
- Time span formality: Formal
- Lower boundary definition: Base of magnetic polarity chronozone C2r (Matuyama); Extinction of the Haptophytes Discoaster pentaradiatus and Discoaster surculus
- Lower boundary GSSP: Monte San Nicola Section, Gela, Sicily, Italy; 37.1469°N 14.2035°E
- Lower GSSP ratified: August 1996 (as base of Gelasian)
- Upper boundary definition: Approximately 8 m after the end of magnetic polarity chronozone C2n (Olduvai).
- Upper boundary GSSP: Vrica Section, Calabria, Italy; 39.0385°N 17.1348°E
- Upper GSSP ratified: 5 December 2011 (as base of Calabrian)

The Gelasian is an age in the international geologic timescale or a stage in chronostratigraphy, being the earliest or lowest subdivision of the Quaternary Period/System and Pleistocene Epoch/Series. It spans from 2.58–1.80 million years ago, following the Piacenzian Age (from the Pliocene Epoch) and preceding the Calabrian Age.

== Definition ==
The Gelasian was introduced in the geologic timescale in August 1996. It is named after the Sicilian city of Gela in the south of the island, with its GSSP being located near the city at Monte San Nicola. In 2009 it was moved from the Pliocene to the Pleistocene so that the geologic time scale would be more consistent with the key changes in Earth's climate, oceans, and biota that occurred 2.58 million years ago.

Magnetostratigraphically, the base of the Gelasian is defined as the base of the Matuyama (C2r) chronozone (at the Gauss-Matuyama magnetostratigraphic boundary), at isotopic stage 103. Above this line, notable extinctions of the calcareous nannofossils occur: Discoaster pentaradiatus and Discoaster surculus. Similarly, the top of the Gelasian is magnetostratigraphically defined as the end of the Olduvai (C2n) chronozone, and faunally as the extinction level of the calcareous nannofossil Discoaster brouweri (base of biozone CN13). Above the Gelasian are the first occurrences of the calcareous nanofossil Gephyrocapsa sp., and the extinction level of the planktonic foraminifer Globigerinoides extremus.

== Climate ==
During the Gelasian the ice sheets in the Northern Hemisphere began to grow, which is seen as the beginning of the Quaternary ice age. Deep sea core samples have identified approximately 40 marine isotope stages (MIS 103 – MIS 64) during the age. Thus, there have probably been about 20 glacial cycles of varying intensity during the Gelasian.

== Europe ==
In the regional glacial history of the Alps, this age is now called Biber. It corresponds to Pre-Tegelen and Tegelen in Northern Europe.

During the Gelasian, the Red Crag Formation of Butley, the Newbourn Crag, the Norwich Crag Formation and the Weybourne Crag Formation (all from East Anglia, England) were deposited. The Gelasian is an equivalent of the Praetiglian and Tiglian Stages as defined in the Netherlands, which are commonly used in northwestern Europe.
