= Quaternary =

Third and current period of the Cenozoic Era, from 2.58 million years ago to the present

- 2.58 – 0 Ma
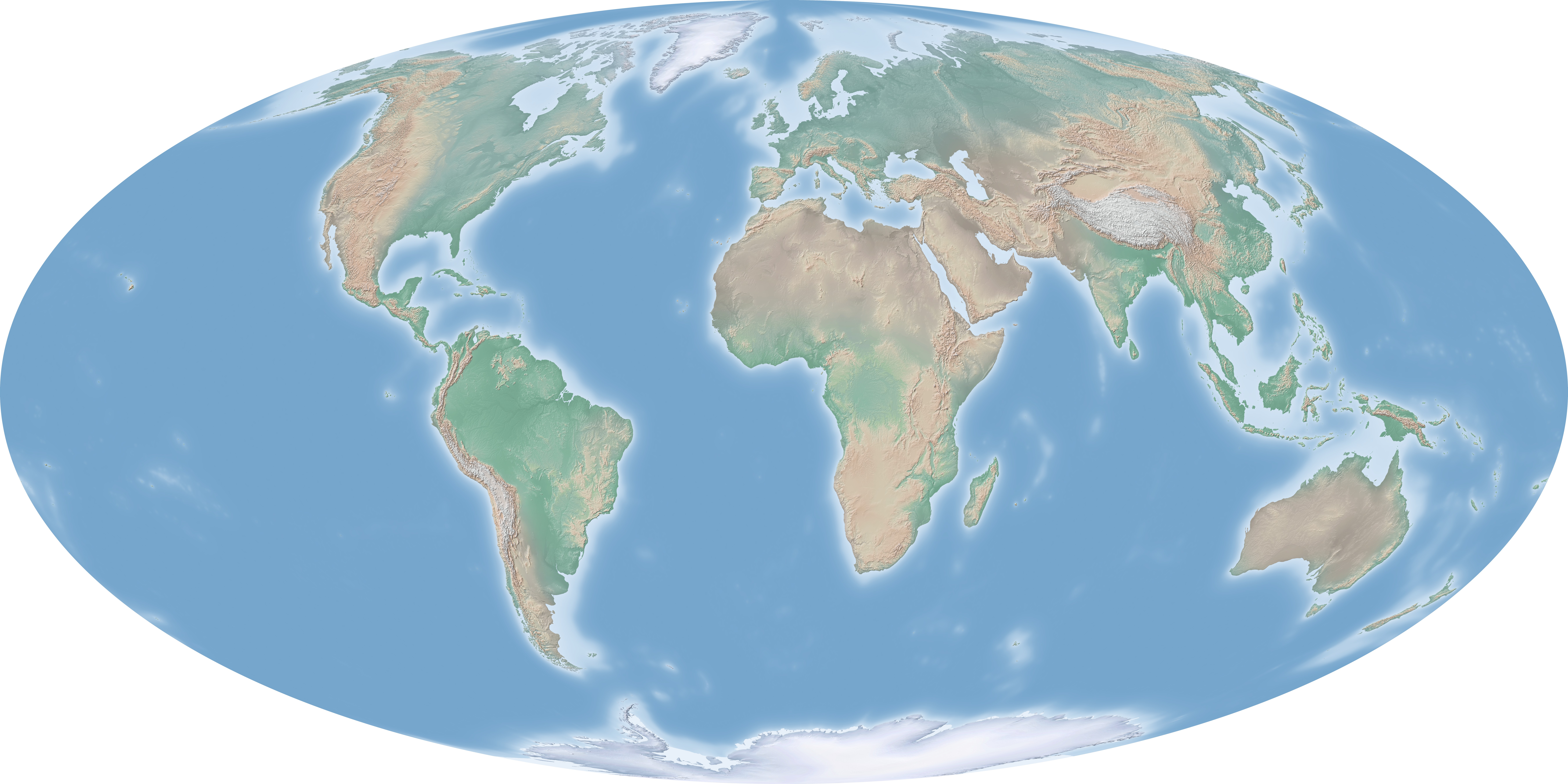
- A map of Earth as it appears during the current Quaternary period, Holocene epoch

Chronology
| ← / Holocene |
Subdivision of the Quaternary according to the ICS, as of 2024. Vertical axis scale: Millions of years ago

Etymology
- Name formality: Formal

Usage information
- Celestial body: Earth
- Regional usage: Global (ICS)
- Time scale(s) used: ICS Time Scale

Definition
- Chronological unit: Period
- Stratigraphic unit: System
- Time span formality: Formal
- Lower boundary definition: Base of magnetic polarity chronozone C2r (Matuyama); Extinction of the Haptophytes Discoaster pentaradiatus and Discoaster surculus
- Lower boundary GSSP: Monte San Nicola Section, Gela, Sicily, Italy; 37.1469°N 14.2035°E
- Lower GSSP ratified: 2009 (as base of Quaternary and Pleistocene)
- Upper boundary definition: Present day
- Upper boundary GSSP: N/A
- Upper GSSP ratified: N/A

Atmospheric and climatic data
- Mean atmospheric O_{2} content: c. 20.8 vol % (100% of modern)
- Mean atmospheric CO_{2} content: c. 250 ppm (0.9 times pre-industrial)
- Mean surface temperature: c. 14 °C (0.5 °C above pre-industrial)

The Quaternary (/kwəˈtɜːrnəri/ kwə-TUR-nər-ee, US also /ˈkwɒtərnɛri/ KWOT-ər-nerr-ee) is the current and most recent of the three periods of the Cenozoic Era in the geologic time scale of the International Commission on Stratigraphy (ICS), as well as the current and most recent of the twelve periods of the Phanerozoic eon. It follows the Neogene Period and spans from 2.6 million years ago to the present. The Quaternary Period is divided into two epochs: the Pleistocene (2.6 million years ago to 12 thousand years ago) and the Holocene (12 thousand years ago to today); a proposed third epoch, the Anthropocene, was rejected in 2024 by International Union of Geological Sciences (IUGS), the governing body of the International Commission on Stratigraphy (ICS).

The Quaternary is typically defined by the Quaternary glaciation, the cyclic growth and decay of continental ice sheets related to the Milankovitch cycles and the associated climate and environmental changes that they caused.

== Research history ==
In 1759 Giovanni Arduino proposed that the geological strata of northern Italy could be divided into four successive formations or "orders" (Italian: quattro ordini). The term "quaternary" was introduced by Jules Desnoyers in 1829 for sediments of France's Seine Basin that clearly seemed to be younger than Tertiary Period rocks.

The Quaternary Period follows the Neogene Period and extends to the present. The Quaternary covers the time span of glaciations classified as the Pleistocene, and includes the present interglacial time-period, the Holocene.

This places the start of the Quaternary at the onset of Northern Hemisphere glaciation approximately 2.6 million years ago (mya). Prior to 2009, the Pleistocene was defined to be from 1.805 million years ago to the present, so the current definition of the Pleistocene includes a portion of what was, prior to 2009, defined as the Pliocene.

Quaternary stratigraphers usually worked with regional subdivisions. From the 1970s, the International Commission on Stratigraphy (ICS) tried to make a single geologic time scale based on GSSP's, which could be used internationally. The Quaternary subdivisions were defined based on biostratigraphy instead of paleoclimate.

This led to the problem that the proposed base of the Pleistocene was at 1.805 million years ago, long after the start of the major glaciations of the northern hemisphere. The ICS then proposed to abolish the use of the name Quaternary altogether, which appeared unacceptable to the International Union for Quaternary Research (INQUA).

In 2009, it was decided to make the Quaternary the youngest period of the Cenozoic Era with its base at 2.588 mya and including the Gelasian Stage, which was formerly considered part of the Neogene Period and Pliocene Epoch. This was later revised to 2.58 mya.

The Anthropocene was proposed as a third epoch as a mark of the anthropogenic impact on the global environment starting with the Industrial Revolution, or about 200 years ago. The Anthropocene was rejected as a geological epoch in 2024 by the International Union of Geological Sciences (IUGS), the governing body of the ICS.

== Geology ==
The 2.58 million years of the Quaternary represent the time during which recognisable humans existed. Over this geologically short time period there has been relatively little change in the distribution of the continents due to plate tectonics.

The Quaternary geological record is preserved in greater detail than that for earlier periods.

The major geographical changes during this time period included the emergence of the straits of Bosphorus and Skagerrak during glacial epochs, which respectively turned the Black Sea and Baltic Sea into fresh water lakes, followed by their flooding (and return to salt water) by rising sea level; the periodic filling of the English Channel, forming a land bridge between Britain and the European mainland; the periodic closing of the Bering Strait, forming the land bridge between Asia and North America; and the periodic flash flooding of Scablands of the American Northwest by glacial water.

The current extent of Hudson Bay, the Great Lakes and other major lakes of North America are a consequence of the Canadian Shield's readjustment since the last ice age; different shorelines have existed over the course of Quaternary time.

== Climate ==
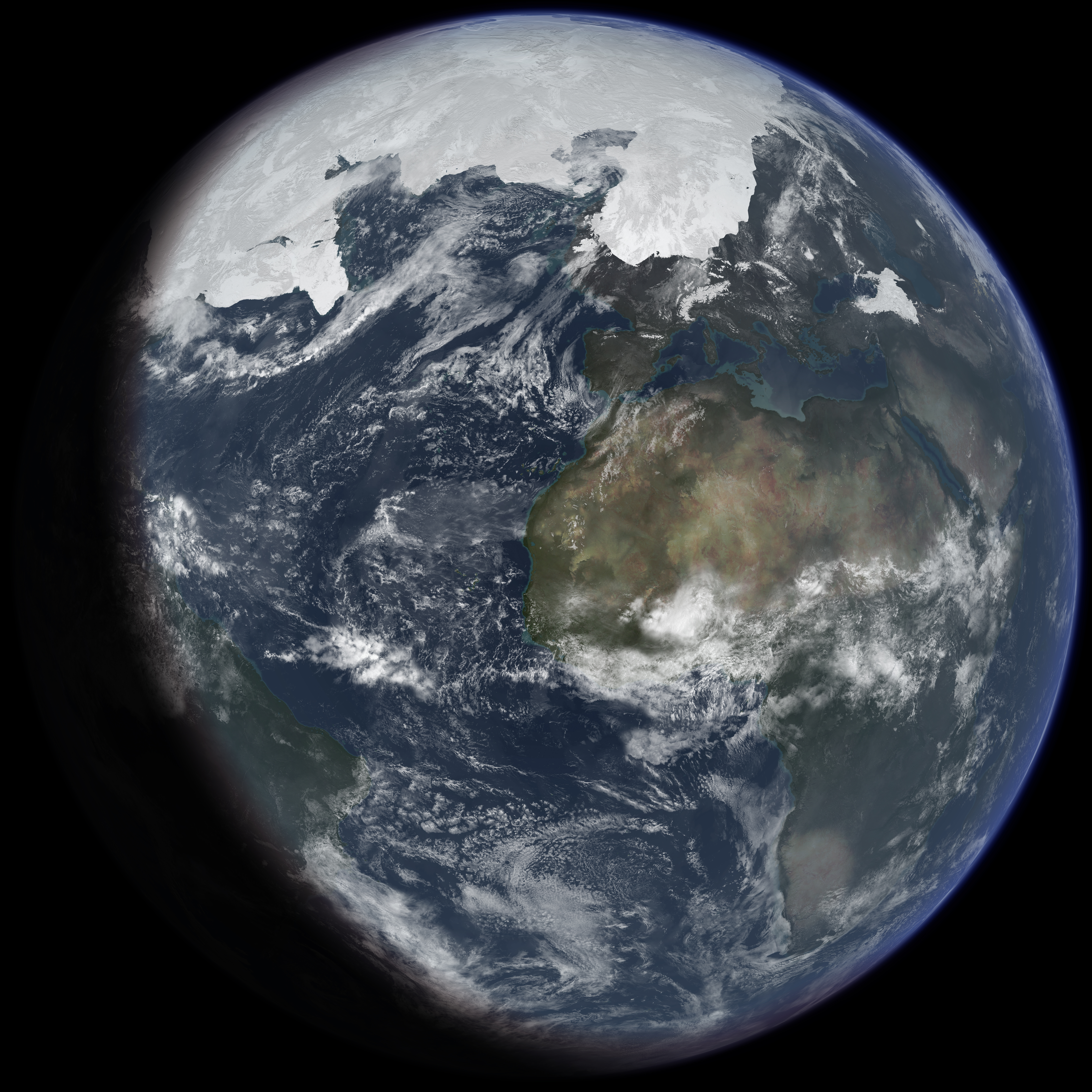
Artist's impression of Earth during the Last Glacial Maximum

The climate was one of periodic glaciations with continental glaciers moving as far from the poles as 40° latitude. Glaciation took place repeatedly during the Quaternary Ice age – a term coined by Schimper in 1839 that began with the start of the Quaternary about 2.58 Mya and continues to the present day.

In 1821, a Swiss engineer, Ignaz Venetz, presented an article in which he suggested the presence of traces of the passage of a glacier at a considerable distance from the Alps. This idea was initially disputed by another Swiss scientist, Louis Agassiz, but when he undertook to disprove it, he ended up affirming his colleague's hypothesis. A year later, Agassiz raised the hypothesis of a great glacial period that would have had long-reaching general effects. This idea gained him international fame and led to the establishment of the Glacial Theory.

In time, thanks to the refinement of geology, it has been demonstrated that there were several periods of glacial advance and retreat and that past temperatures on Earth were very different from today. In particular, the Milankovitch cycles of Milutin Milankovitch are based on the premise that variations in incoming solar radiation are a fundamental factor controlling Earth's climate. During this time, substantial glaciers advanced and retreated over much of North America and Europe, parts of South America and Asia, and all of Antarctica.

== Flora and fauna ==
There was a major extinction of large mammals globally during the Late Pleistocene Epoch. Many forms such as sabre-toothed cats, mammoths, mastodons, glyptodonts, etc., became extinct worldwide. Others, including horses, camels and American cheetahs became extinct in North America.

The Great Lakes formed and giant mammals thrived in parts of North America and Eurasia not covered in ice. These mammals became extinct when the glacial period ended about 11,700 years ago. Modern humans evolved about 315,000 years ago. During the Quaternary Period, mammals, flowering plants, and insects dominated the land.

== See also ==
- List of Quaternary volcanic eruptions
