= Tortonian =

Geologic age of the late Miocene

- 11.63 – 7.246 Ma
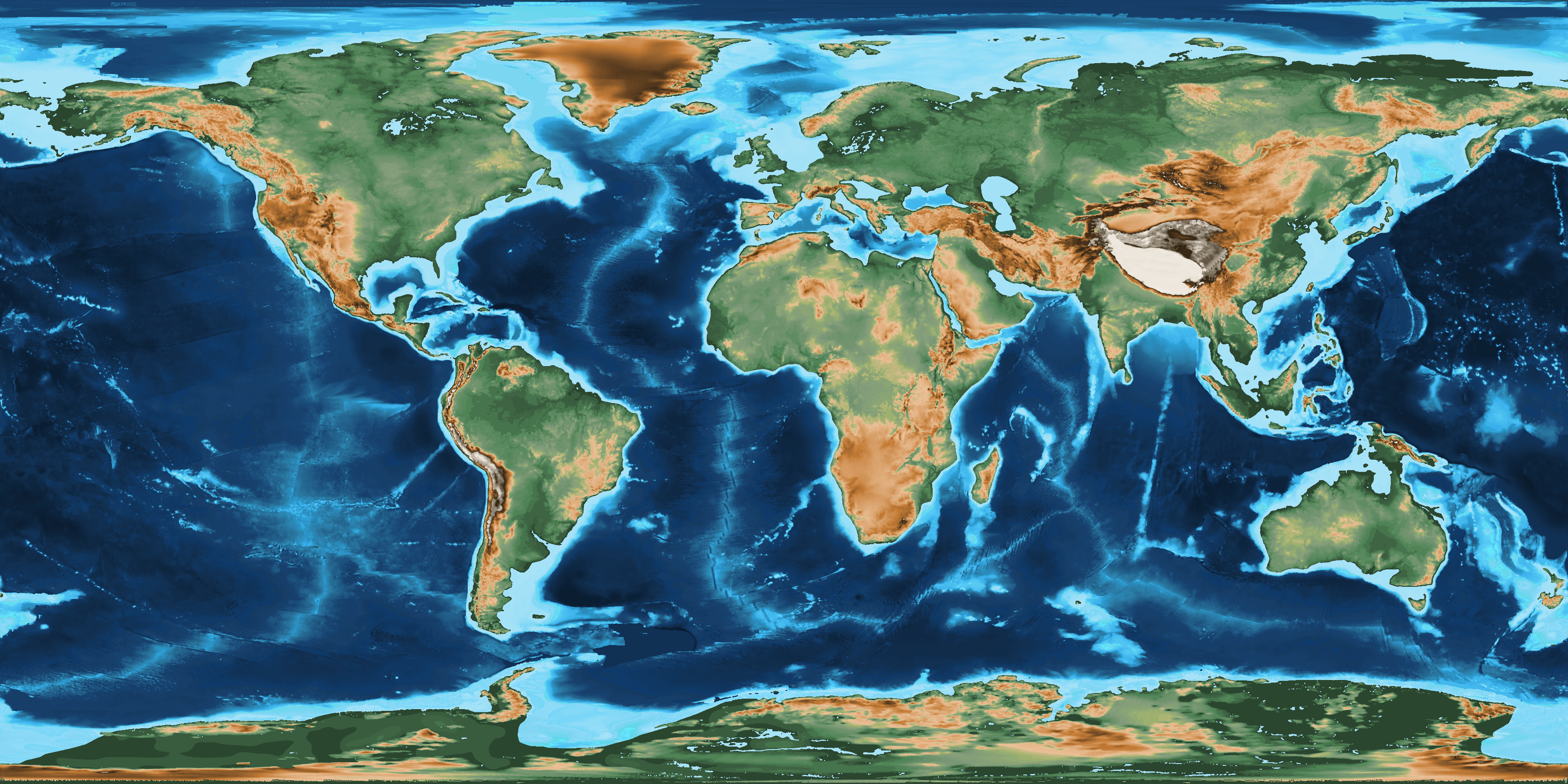
- A map of the world 10 million years ago, during the Tortonian Age.

Chronology
← / Messinian salinity crisis; ← / North American prairie expands
Subdivision of the Neogene according to the ICS, as of 2024. Vertical axis scale: Millions of years ago
- Formerly part of: Tertiary Period/System

Etymology
- Name formality: Formal

Usage information
- Celestial body: Earth
- Regional usage: Global (ICS)
- Time scale(s) used: ICS Time Scale

Definition
- Chronological unit: Age
- Stratigraphic unit: Stage
- Time span formality: Formal
- Lower boundary definition: LAD of the Haptophyte Discoaster kugleri
- Lower boundary GSSP: Monte dei Corvi Beach section, Ancona, Italy; 43.5867°N 13.5694°E
- Lower GSSP ratified: 2003
- Upper boundary definition: First regular occurrence of the Planktonic Foraminifer Globorotalia miotumida; FAD of the Haptophyte Amaurolithus delicatus
- Upper boundary GSSP: Oued Akrech section, Rabat, Morocco; 33.9369°N 6.8125°W
- Upper GSSP ratified: January 2000

The Tortonian is in the geologic time scale an age or stage of the late Miocene that spans the time between 11.608 ± 0.005 Ma and 7.246 ± 0.005 Ma (million years ago). It follows the Serravallian and is followed by the Messinian.

The Tortonian roughly overlaps with the regional Pannonian Stage of the Paratethys timescale of Central Europe. It also overlaps the upper Astaracian, Vallesian and lower Turolian European land mammal ages, the upper Clarendonian and lower Hemphillian North American land mammal ages and the upper Chasicoan and lower Huayquerian South American land mammal ages.

== Definition ==
The Tortonian was introduced by Swiss stratigrapher Karl Mayer-Eymar in 1858. It was named after the Italian city of Tortona in the Piedmont region.

The base of the Tortonian Stage is at the last common appearance of calcareous nanoplankton Discoaster kugleri and planktonic foram Globigerinoides subquadratus. It is also associated with the short normal polarized magnetic chronozone C5r.2n. A GSSP for the Tortonian has been established in the Monte dei Corvi section near Ancona (Italy).

The top of the Tortonian (the base of the Messinian) is at the first appearance of the planktonic foram species Globorotalia conomiozea and is stratigraphically in the middle of magnetic chronozone C3Br.1r.

== Geologic history ==
In 2020, geologists reported two newly-identified supervolcano eruptions associated with the Yellowstone hotspot track, including the region's largest and most cataclysmic event – the Grey's Landing super-eruption – which had a volume of at least 2,800 cubic kilometres (670 cubic miles) and occurred around 8.72 Ma.

Around 10 Ma, the inflow of North Atlantic Deep Water (NADW) into the Indian Ocean increased significantly.
