= Betic corridor =

Strait of water

A reconstruction of the paleogeography inferred at the west (Atlantic) end of the Mediterranean Sea during the early- to mid- Miocene; north is to the left.: Red = current coastline; S = Sorbas basin, Spain; R = Rifean corridor; B = Betic corridor; G = Strait of Gibraltar; M = Mediterranean Sea

The Betic Corridor, or North-Betic Strait, was a strait of water connecting the Mediterranean Sea with the Atlantic Ocean that once separated the Iberian plate from the Eurasian Plate through the Betic Cordillera. Its closure approximately 5.96 million years ago during the Messinian period of the Miocene epoch, precipitated the Messinian Salinity Crisis, a period when the Mediterranean Sea evaporated partly or completely.

== Geology ==
Betic corridor rock facies consist of heterozoan bioclastic carbonates and mixed siliciclastic–carbonates with conglomerates appearing in local fan-delta deposits. Betic deposits exhibit huge trough cross-bedded structures with single troughs up to 5 m high pointing to the east in the easternmost outcrops. In central outcrops, they reach up to 15 m in height and some tens of metres in length and point both to the east and to the west. The westernmost outcrops show the largest cross-bedded structures, up to 20 m in height and some hundreds of metres in length, all pointing to the west. The large-scale cross-bedding was generated by the migration of very large dunes moved by tides. The largest structures are inferred to have formed at depths of 90 m. Depth estimations indicate that the Betic corridor shallowed toward the Mediterranean and deepened toward the Atlantic. The Miocene evolution towards the formation of the Betic corridor can be divided into a series of steps. The palaeogeography evolved from a south-facing platform, marginal to a northeastern relief, to a wide-open marine passage limited by a southern platform and, finally, to a tidal-dominated strait. The closing of the Betic corridor is recorded by the presence of lagoonal, silty sediments covered by a stromatolite layer and crowned by a red soil in the westernmost outcrops.
