= Red Sea brine pool microbiology =

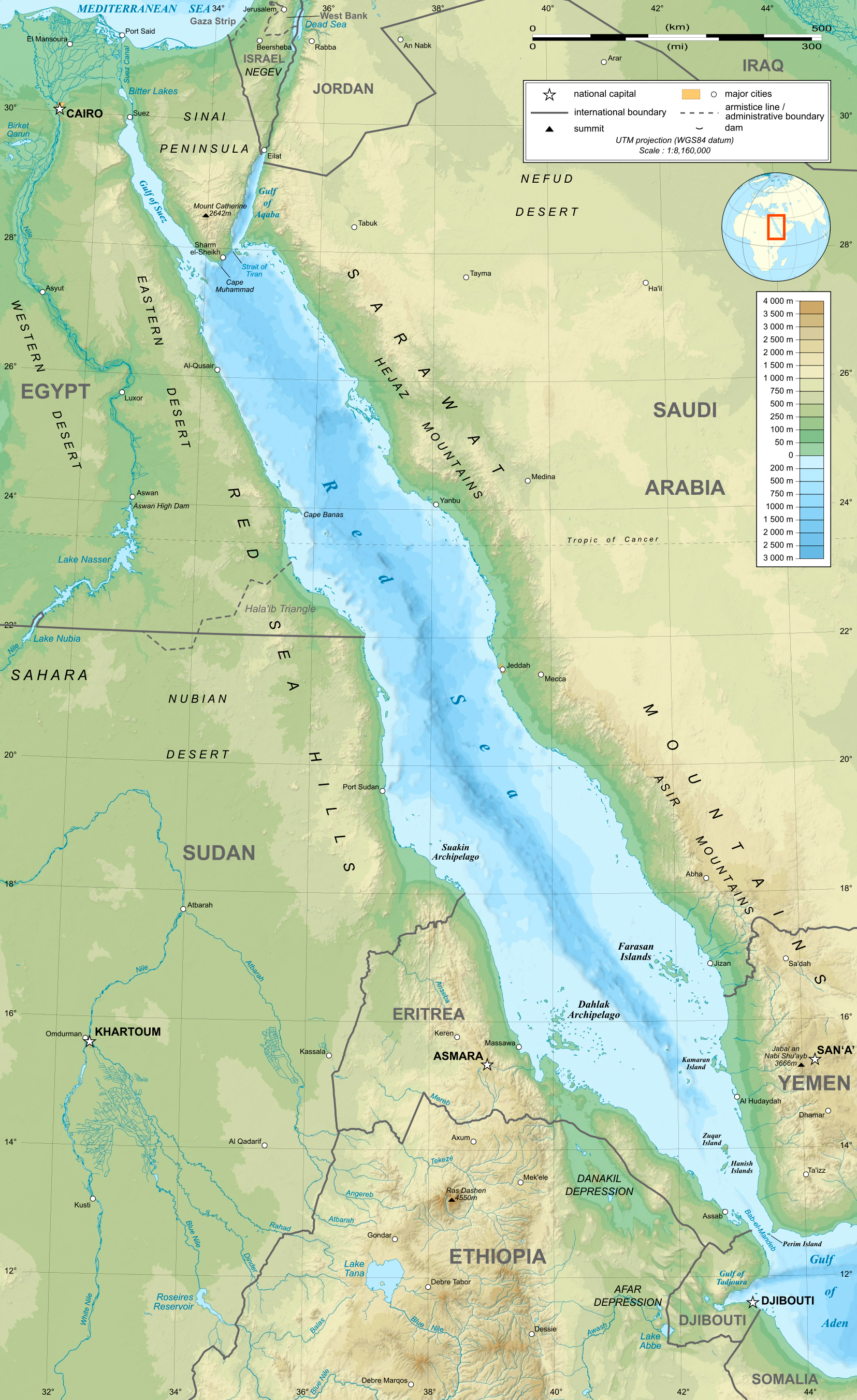
Topographic map of the Red Sea and the relative location.

The Red Sea and its extensions of the Gulf of Suez and the Gulf of Aqaba contain the largest recorded concentration of deep-sea brine pools on the planet. These pools have many features that make them uninhabitable to almost all organisms on the planet, yet certain communities of microbes thrive within these extreme environments that have temperatures ranging from 2.0 °C to 75 °C. The Red Sea brine pools have extreme salt concentrations and varying compositions of nutrients and other chemicals that directly affect their microbiomes. There are approximately 25 individual pools in the region, some of which are closely clustered together in groups, leading to their undetermined classification of names. The brine pools originate from hydrothermal vents, the shifting of tectonic plates, and the accumulation of water with properties that make it unsuitable for mixing, leading to its accumulation within faults and divots in the sea floor. Atlantis II Deep, Discovery Deep, and the Kebrit are the most investigated and researched brine pools within the Red Sea. Additionally, many microbial species form beneficial symbiotic relationships with organisms living and feeding in proximity to the pools. These relationships allow for the study of specialized adaptations of microbes to brine pool environments.

== List ==
In addition to the originally-discovered warm brine pools, recent discoveries have found four smaller warm brine pools named the NEOM Brine Pools located in the Gulf of Aqaba. Furthermore, multiple cold seeps have been identified in the Red Sea (the Thuwal Cold Seeps), consisting of two individual pools. Three of these Red Sea brine pools are unnamed, as they are small and potentially extensions of other nearby larger pools.

List of Red Sea brine pools and cold seeps
Brine pool number	Warm brine pool	Cold seeps
1	Albatross Deep	
2	Atlantis II Deep	
3	Chain Deep	
4	Conrad Deep	
5	Discovery Deep	
6	Erba Deep	
7	Kebrit Deep	
8, 9, 10, 11	NEOM brine pools	
12	Nereus Deep	
13	Oceanographers Deep	
14	Port Sudan Deep	
15	Shaban Deep	
16	Shagara Deep	
17	Suakin Deep	
18	Valdiva Deeps	
19	Wando Basin	
20, 21		Thuwal Cold Seeps

== Viral diversity ==
=== Composition ===
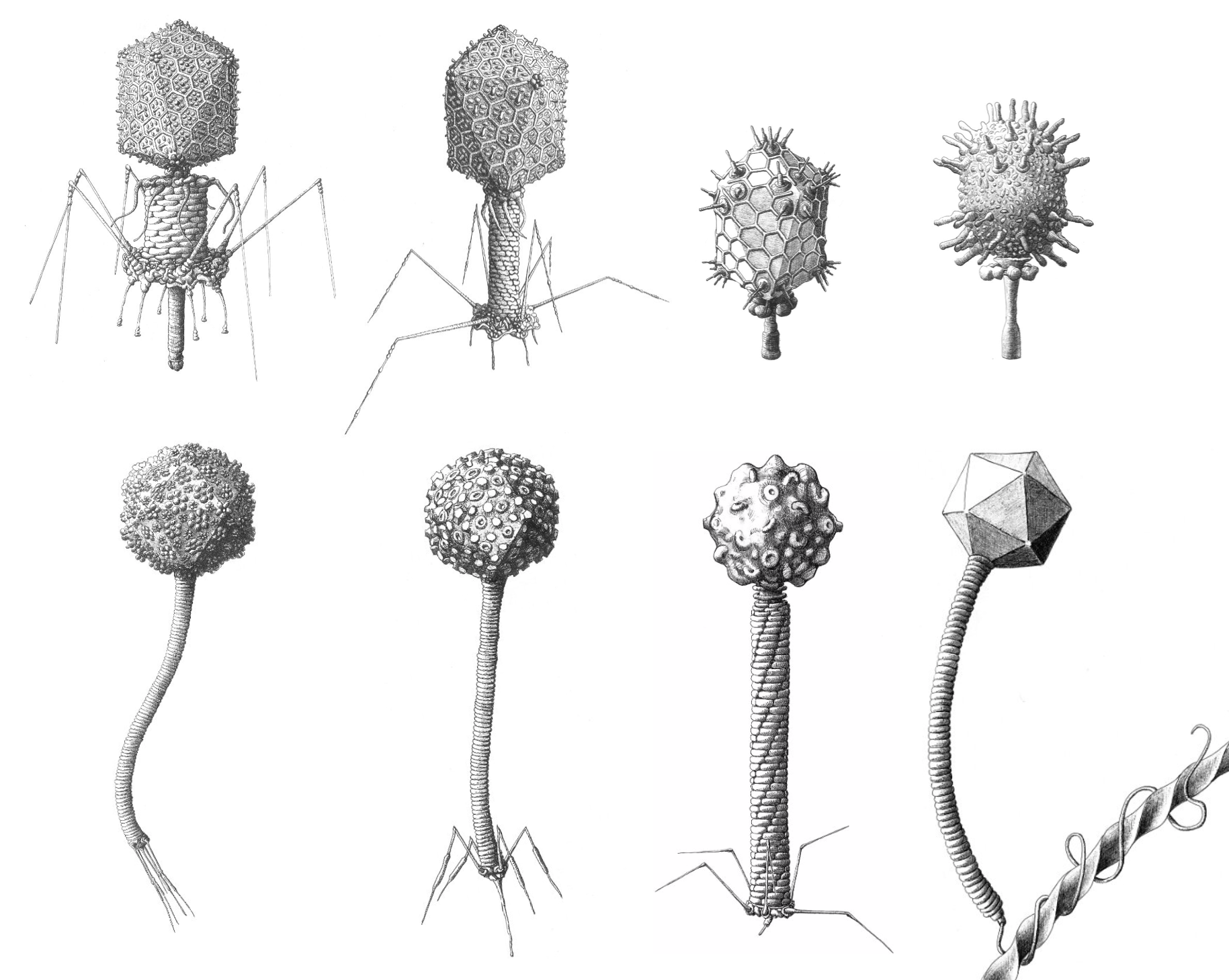
Morphologies of varying Caudovirales including Siphoviridae, Myoviridae, and Podoviridae.

The virus community within the many Red Sea brine pools is largely unexplored. However, with the use of metagenomics, viral communities of the Atlantis II Deep, Discovery Deep, and the Kebrit Deep reveal diverse and distinct viruses within and between the brine pools. Across all three brine pools, double-stranded DNA (dsDNA) are the most dominant viruses. Of the dsDNA viruses investigated, Caudovirales are the most abundant across all three brine pools. Low abundances of Phycodnaviridae and trace amounts of Iridoviridae are also present within the brine-seawater interfaces, and thus may be indicative of a "pickling" effect rather than a host-specific presence.

=== Stratification of viral communities ===
Viral species tend to follow their bacterial-host population dynamics. Bacterial and archaeal composition and abundance differ between specific layers of the brine pool, including the overlying brine seawater, the brine-water interface, the brine-pool sediments, and direct brine waters. As a result, the viral community within the brine pools of the Red Sea are stratified across the brine-seawater interface. The Kebrit Deep's brine-seawater interface upper layer is dominated by marine bacteria-infecting viruses, relative to the lower layer brine-seawater interface which is dominated by haloviruses and halophages.

=== Role of viruses ===
Deep-sea marine viruses maintain the diversity and abundance of the microbial community, recycling and supplying essential nutrients and biomolecules, and regulating the biogeochemical cycling. In deep, anoxic environments such as the Red Sea brine pools, viral infection of prokaryotes releases cellular DNA. Extracellular DNA released through infection supplies highly labile biomolecules in these water conditions limited by external input supporting microbial communities. Through lysogenic viral infection and horizontal gene transfer, the viral community in the Red Sea brine pools contribute to microbial DNA repair, nucleotide metabolism, and the evolutionary adaptations of the microbial community.

== Bacterial and archaeal diversity and adaptations ==
The Red Sea brine pools were once thought to be inhospitable to life. However, extremophiles have adapted to these environments through the development of novel enzymes and metabolic pathways.

The various brine pools contain somewhat similar diversities of microbes; however, due to the different characteristics of each brine pool, distinct microbe compositions are seen. Similarly to the Gulf of Mexico brine pools, the Red Sea brine pool experiences stratification within each distinct brine pool. Therefore, as a result of the stratification, varying physical and chemical properties occur with respect to depth, ensuing a transition in the microbial community with respect to depth.

Moreover, the stratification causes sharp brine-seawater interfaces, with typically-steep gradients in salinity, temperature, density, oxygen, and pH. These distinct interfaces between layers of well-mixed water are characteristic of liquids that are stabilized by salt but destabilized by heating from below. Heat at the bottom of these stable salinity gradients causes double-diffusive convection events.

=== Specific bacterial composition ===
Deep-sea anoxic brines (referred to as DHABs, deep hypersaline anoxic basins) are developed by a process of re-dissolving of evaporitic sediments buried at shallow depths, tectonic ejection of the interstitial brine reacted with the evaporites, or by hydrothermal phase separation.

These are examples of various types of bacteria (Table 1) under the brine pools:

Class	Family	Genus/species/strain
Gammaproteobacteria	Pseudomonadaceae	Pseudomonas sp
Deltaproteobacteria	Desulfovibrionaceae	Desulfovibrio sp.
Deferribacteres	Deferrribacteraceae	Flexistipes sinusarabici
Gammaproteobacteria	Alteromonadaceae	Marinobacter salsuginis
Clostridia	Halanaerobiaceae	Halanaerobium sp.
Firmicutes/Mollicutes	Haloplasmataceae	Haloplasma contractile
Halobacteria	Halobacteriaceae	Halorhabdus tiamatea
Gammaproteobacteria	Alteromonadaceae	Marinobacter salsuginis
	Colwelliaceae	Salinisphaera shabanensis
	Idiomarinaceae	Halanaerobium sp.
	Salinisphaeraceae	Nitrosovibrio sp.

=== Influence of stratification ===
Stratification within and around water layers is a characteristic of brine pools due to the highly saline environment. Specifically, in the Red Sea, as a result of this stratification in the deep sea brine pools, microbial communities are subject to differences their vertical distribution and composition. For example, through the use of metagenomics and pyrosequencing, the microbial communities of two deeps (Atlantis II and Discovery) were investigated with respect to vertical distribution. In terms of archaeal communities, both deeps showed similar composition having the upper layer (20–50 m) enriched in Halobacteriales, and as salt concentration increased and oxygen decreased, Desulfurococcales tended to dominate due to physiological adaptations. The bacterial composition in the upper layer consisted of Cyanobacteria due to the presence of light. Deeper in the water column, Proteobacteria, specifically the gamma-subdivision group (orders Thiotrichales, Salinisphaerales, Chromatiales, and Alteromonadales) were found to dominate the more extreme conditions.

The stratification within the Red Sea Brine Pools therefore allows for a complex composition of the microbial community with depth. Due to the variability between each brine pool, this would account for differences in taxa at each location and at each depth.

=== Bacterial enzymes ===
Extremozymes are very prominent in Red Sea brine pools as they have the ability to be able to catalyze reactions under harsh environments.

In general, extremozymes can be separated into categories depending on habitats, such as those that can resist extremes of cold (psychrophiles), heat (thermophiles and hyperthermophiles), acidity (acidophiles), alkalinity (alkaliphiles), and salinity (halophiles). Red Sea brine pools are subject to host a polyextremophilic microbiological community providing the environment with a source of extremozymes.

Moreover, most of the extremozymes are classified into three classes of enzymes: oxidoreductases, transferases, and hydrolases; these are important in terms of metabolic processes for the organisms within this habitat as well as for potential applications.

=== Symbiotic Relationships ===
Several anoxic, high-salinity deep-sea basins in the Red Sea generate notably sharp interfaces that produce a variety of physicochemical gradients. By acting as a particle trap for organic and inorganic elements from saltwater, brine pools have the ability to significantly increase the supply of nutrients and the possibility for bacterial growth. On the other hand, halophilic bacteria are required to evolve specific structures to survive the brine pool habitat. For example, halophilic enzymes have a higher proportion of acidic amino acid residues than non-halophilic homologues. These bacterias accumate high concentrations of KCl in their cytoplasms, which reach saturation.

=== Potential applications for enzymes ===
Recently, twelve enzymes have been detected in the Red Sea brine pools (Atlantis II Deep, Discovery Deep, and Kebrit Deep) with specific biochemical properties that are promising in their potential applications. The microbes that inhabit the hot, hypersaline, anoxic, and toxic-metal-contaminated Red Sea brine pools produce or accumulate microbial enzymes known as extremozymes allowing life to survive. The chemical and physical properties, in addition to the stability of the extremozymes, provides potential uses in areas including industrial, biotechnical, and pharmaceutical disciplines.

The different enzymes can be attributed to the different organisms that live within each brine pool due to the environments' variable conditions. The Kebrit Deep, one of the smallest Red Sea brine pools, is at 21-23 °C not considered a hot brine. Other characteristics include a pH of 5.2, an 84-m-thick brine layer, and high levels of hydrogen sulfide. The Atlantis II Deep is among the largest Red Sea brine pools and has high temperatures (~68 °C), a pH of 5.3, and high metal content. While Discovery Deep is similar to Atlantis II Deep, it has differences in metal content and is less extreme overall.

Red Sea Brine Pool Extremozymes and Potential Applications
Brine Pool	Extremozyme	Potential Uses
Atlantis II Deep	ADH/A1a	Pharmaceuticals and biodegradation
	ATII-TrxR	Cancer therapy and antibiotics
	ATII-LCL MerA	Bioremediation and mercury detoxification
	ATII-LCL-NH	Bioremediation
	BR3 pol	Biomedical DNA techniques
	ATII-APH(3')	Biotechnology and antibiotics
	EstATII	Pharmaceuticals, cosmetics, and biodegradation
	ATII-ABL	Biotechnology and antibiotics
	NItraS-ATII	Pharmaceuticals and bioremediation
Discovery Deep	ADH/D1	Pharmaceutical and biodegradation
	CA_D	Carbon sequestration
Kebrit Deep	K09H MerA	Bioremediation and mercury detoxification
	K35NH MerA	Bioremediation and mercury detoxification

== Recent discoveries and future implications ==
The Thuwal cold seeps were accidentally discovered in the Red Sea at about 850m deep on 7 May 2010 by a remotely-operated vehicle. The scientists were conducting a continental slope survey of the Red Sea as part of the KAUST Red Sea Expedition 2010. These cold seeps occur along the tectonically-active continental margin within the Red Sea where hypersaline brine seeps out of the seabed and associates with brine pool formations. The Thuwal cold seeps are considered "cold" due to their cooler temperature (about 21.7 °C) relative to other brine pools found within the Red Sea.

Cold seeps are a component of deep sea ecosystems where chemosynthetic bacteria acting as the base of this community use the methane and hydrogen sulfide in seep water as their energy source. The microbial community acts as a base of the food chain for an ecosystem of organisms that helps sustain and feed bottom- and filter-feeders such as bivalves.

=== Discovery of NEOM Brine Pools ===
During a 2020 research expedition, with the use of bathymetry and geophysical observations, four complex brine pools were discovered in the northern Gulf of Aqaba, which had not yet been known to harbor brine pools. The discovery consisted of three small brine pools less than 10 m^{2} and another pool that was 10,000 m^{2} which were given the name NEOM Brine Pools. The NEOM Brine Pools are distinct from other Red Sea brine pools as they are located much closer to the shore. Due to the brine pools' location at 2 km offshore, they are subject to sediment shed and as a result can preserve geophysical properties that could potentially give insight to historical tsunamis, flash floods, and earthquakes that may have occurred in the Gulf Aqaba.

Within these NEOM brine pools, stratification of the overlaying water, the interface, and the brine water caused stratification of microbial diversity. The upper layer consisted of aerobic microbes such as Gammaproteobacteria, Thaumarchaeota Alphaproteobacteria, and Nitrospira. In the deeper convective layers of the NEOM pools, sulfate-reducing and methanogenic microorganisms were more abundant, given the anaerobic conditions.
