= Iberian plate =

Small tectonic plate now part of the Eurasian plate

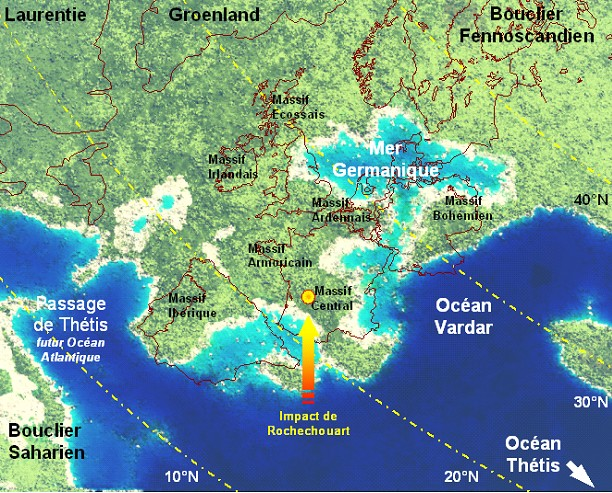
Euramerica (Late Triassic, Norian, 220 Ma, in French). Translation: Laurentia, Greenland, Fennoscandian Shield, Saharan Shield, Iberian plate, Irish plate, Scottish plate, Massif Central, Armorican Massif, L' Ardenne, Bohemian terrane, Rochechouart impact structure ('Impact') and Tethys Ocean.

Most important structures and zones of the Hercynian orogeny in Europe.

The Iberian plate is a microplate typically grouped with the Eurasian plate that includes the microcontinent Iberia, Corsica, Sardinia, the Balearic Islands, the Briançonnais zone of the Penninic nappes of the Alps, and the portion of Morocco north of the High Atlas Mountains. The Iberian plate is a part of the Eurasian plate.

== Neoproterozoic ==
The Iberian plate came into existence during the Cadomian Orogeny of the late Neoproterozoic, about 650–550 Ma, on the margin of the Gondwana continent, involving the collisions and accretion of the island arcs of the central Iberian plate, Ossa-Morena plate, South Portuguese plate. The three plates have never separated substantially from each other since that time.

== Mesozoic ==
In the Mesozoic, Late Jurassic Africa started moving east, and the Alpine Tethys opened. Subsidence related to this caused deep deposits of sediments on the east and some sediment remnants in pop downs in central parts of Spain. Two stages of rifting occurred in the east, one from Later Permian to Triassic, and the second from Late Jurassic to early Cretaceous.

On the south side deposits of carbonates and clastic sediments formed a shelf in shallow water during late Triassic and Liassic times. This was rifted in Toarcian times (Early Jurassic 190 Ma). Active rifting was complete by 160 Ma. After this thermal subsidence occurred till the end of Cretaceous. During this time rifting separated North America from Africa forming a transform zone. In the late Triassic and early Jurassic there were two stages of rifting involving extension and subsidence on the western margin of Iberia. It also extended the western margin. The Iberian Abyssal Plain, off the west coast of Portugal and Spain, formed 126 Ma. This separated Newfoundland's Grand Banks, with Galicia Bank and Flemish Cap being split at 118 Ma. By Early Cretaceous, 110 Ma rifting occurs on west and north west edges.

During the time of the supercontinent Pangea, the Iberian plate was joined to Armorica (Northern France). During the break-up of Pangea, in the early Cretaceous, the Bay of Biscay started opening around 126 Ma and completed by 85 Ma. This created the Biscay Abyssal Plain, and parted the Iberian plate from the Trevelyan Escarpment. During this time Iberia rotated anticlockwise relative to Eurasia. This caused the subduction of the Ligurian Basin onto the eastern side. This formed the Betic nappe stack. After 85 Ma the Atlantic Ocean opening started between Ireland and Greenland. This left the Bay of Biscay as a failed rift.

== Cenozoic ==
The rotation of Iberia and its relation to the formation of the Pyrenees has been difficult to decipher with certainty. Detailed aeromagnetic measurements from the sea floor offshore of the Grand Banks of Newfoundland show that Iberia moved as part of the African plate from late Cretaceous to mid-Eocene time, with a plate boundary extending westward from the Bay of Biscay. When motion along this boundary ceased, a boundary linking extension in the Kings Trough to compression along the Pyrenees came into existence.

Since the late Oligocene, the Iberian plate has been moving as part of the Eurasian plate, with the boundary between Eurasia and Africa situated along the Azores–Gibraltar fracture zone.

Continued rotation of the Iberian plate in the early Miocene once again separated the Iberian plate from Eurasia opening the Betic Corridor, a strait of water connecting the Mediterranean Sea with the Atlantic Ocean. As the Iberian plate rotated, it closed the Betic Corridor approximately 5.96 million years ago during the Messinian period of the Miocene, precipitating the Messinian Salinity Crisis, a period when the Mediterranean Sea evaporated partly or completely.

== Iberian geology ==
The core of the Iberian Peninsula consists of a Hercynian cratonic block known as the Iberian Massif. On the northeast this is bounded by The Pyrenean fold belt, and on the southeast it is bounded by the Betic Foldchain. These twofold chains are part of the Alpine belt. To the west, the peninsula is delimited by the continental boundary formed by the magma poor opening of the Atlantic Ocean. The Hercynian Foldbelt is mostly buried by Mesozoic and Tertiary cover rocks to the east, but nevertheless outcrops through the Iberian Chain and the Catalan Coastal Ranges.

== See also ==
- List of tectonic plates

== Bibliography ==
=== References ===
- Andeweg, Bernd (2002). Cenozoic tectonic evolution of the Iberian Peninsula, causes and effects of changing stress fields (PhD Thesis). Vrije Universiteit Amsterdam.
- Benjamin Le Bayon; Michel Ballèvre (May 2006). "Deformation history of a subducted continental crust (Gran Paradiso, Western Alps): continuing crustal shortening during exhumation". Journal of Structural Geology. 28 (5): 793–815. Bibcode:2006JSG....28..793L. doi:10.1016/j.jsg.2006.02.009.
- Krijgsman, W.; Garcés, M.; Langereis, C.G.; Daams, R.; van Dam, J.; van der Meulen, A.J.; Agustí, J.; Cabrera, L. (August 1996). "A new chronology for the middle to late Miocene continental record in Spain" (PDF). Earth and Planetary Science Letters. 142 (3–4): 367–380. Bibcode:1996E&PSL.142..367K. doi:10.1016/0012-821X(96)00109-4.
- López-Guijarro, Rafael; Armendáriz, Maider; Quesada, Cecilio; Fernández-Suárez, Javier; Murphy, J. Brendan; Pin, Christian; Bellido, Felix (December 2008). "Ediacaran–Palaeozoic tectonic evolution of the Ossa Morena and Central Iberian zones (SW Iberia) as revealed by Sm–Nd isotope systematics" (PDF). Tectonophysics. 461 (1–4): 202–214. Bibcode:2008Tectp.461..202L. doi:10.1016/j.tecto.2008.06.006. S2CID 129446841.
- José M. Martín; Juan C. Braga; Julio Aguirre; Ángel Puga-Bernabéu (15 April 2009). "History and evolution of the North-Betic Strait (Prebetic Zone, Betic Cordillera): A narrow, early Tortonian, tidal-dominated, Atlantic–Mediterranean marine passage". Sedimentary Geology. 216 (3–4): 80–90. Bibcode:2009SedG..216...80M. doi:10.1016/j.sedgeo.2009.01.005.
- Olivet, J.L.; Bonnin, J.; Beuzart, Paul; Auzende, Jean-Marie (October 1984). "Cinématique de l'Atlantique Nord et Central" [Kinematics of the North and Central Atlantic] (PDF). Publication du Centre National Pour l'Exploitation des Océans. Rapports scientifiques et techniques (in French). 54. Paris: Centre Océanologique de Bretagne, Brest: 1–108.
- Le Pichon, X.; Sibuet, J.C. (September 1971). "Western extension of boundary between European and Iberian plates during the Pyrenean orogeny". Earth and Planetary Science Letters. 12 (1): 83–88. Bibcode:1971E&PSL..12...83L. doi:10.1016/0012-821X(71)90058-6.
- Le Pichon, Xavier; Sibuet, Jean-Claude; Francheteau, Jean (March 1977). "The fit of the continents around the North Atlantic Ocean". Tectonophysics. 38 (3–4): 169–209. Bibcode:1977Tectp..38..169L. doi:10.1016/0040-1951(77)90210-4.
- L.M. Pinheiro; R.C.L. Wilson; R. Pena dos Reis; R.B. Whitmarsh; A. Ribeiro (1996). "The Western Iberia Margin: A Geophysical and Geological Overview" (PDF). Proceedings of the Ocean Drilling Program. Scientific Results. 149: 3–23. ISSN 0884-5891.
- Savostin, Léonid A.; Sibuet, Jean-Claude; Zonenshain, Lev P.; Le Pichon, Xavier; Roulet, Marie-José (March 1986). "Kinematic evolution of the Tethys belt from the Atlantic ocean to the pamirs since the Triassic". Tectonophysics. 123 (1–4): 1–35. Bibcode:1986Tectp.123....1S. doi:10.1016/0040-1951(86)90192-7.
- Schouten, H.; Srivastava, S. P.; Klitgord, K. (1984). "Iberian plate kinematics: jumping plate boundaries, an alternative to ball-bearing tectonics". Trans. Am. Geophys. Union. 65: 190.
- Sclater, J. G.; Hellinger, S.; Tapscott, C. R. J. (1977). "Paleobathymetry of Atlantic Ocean From Jurassic To Present". Journal of Geology. 85 (5): 509–552. Bibcode:1977JG.....85..509S. doi:10.1086/628336. ISSN 0022-1376. S2CID 129522366.
- Seber, D.; Barazangi, M.; Ibenbrahim, A.; Demnati, A. (1996). "Geophysical evidence for lithospheric delamination beneath the Alboran Sea and Rif—Betic mountains". Nature. 379 (6568): 785–790. Bibcode:1996Natur.379..785S. doi:10.1038/379785a0. hdl:1813/5287. S2CID 4332684.
- Srivastava, S. P.; Schouten, H.; Roest, W. R.; Klitgord, K. D.; Kovacs, L. C.; Verhoef, J.; Macnab, R. (April 1990). "Iberian plate kinematics: a jumping plate boundary between Eurasia and Africa". Nature. 344 (6268): 756–759. Bibcode:1990Natur.344..756S. doi:10.1038/344756a0. ISSN 1476-4687. S2CID 4362197.
