= Messinian salinity crisis =

Drying-up of the Mediterranean Sea 5.96–5.33 million years ago

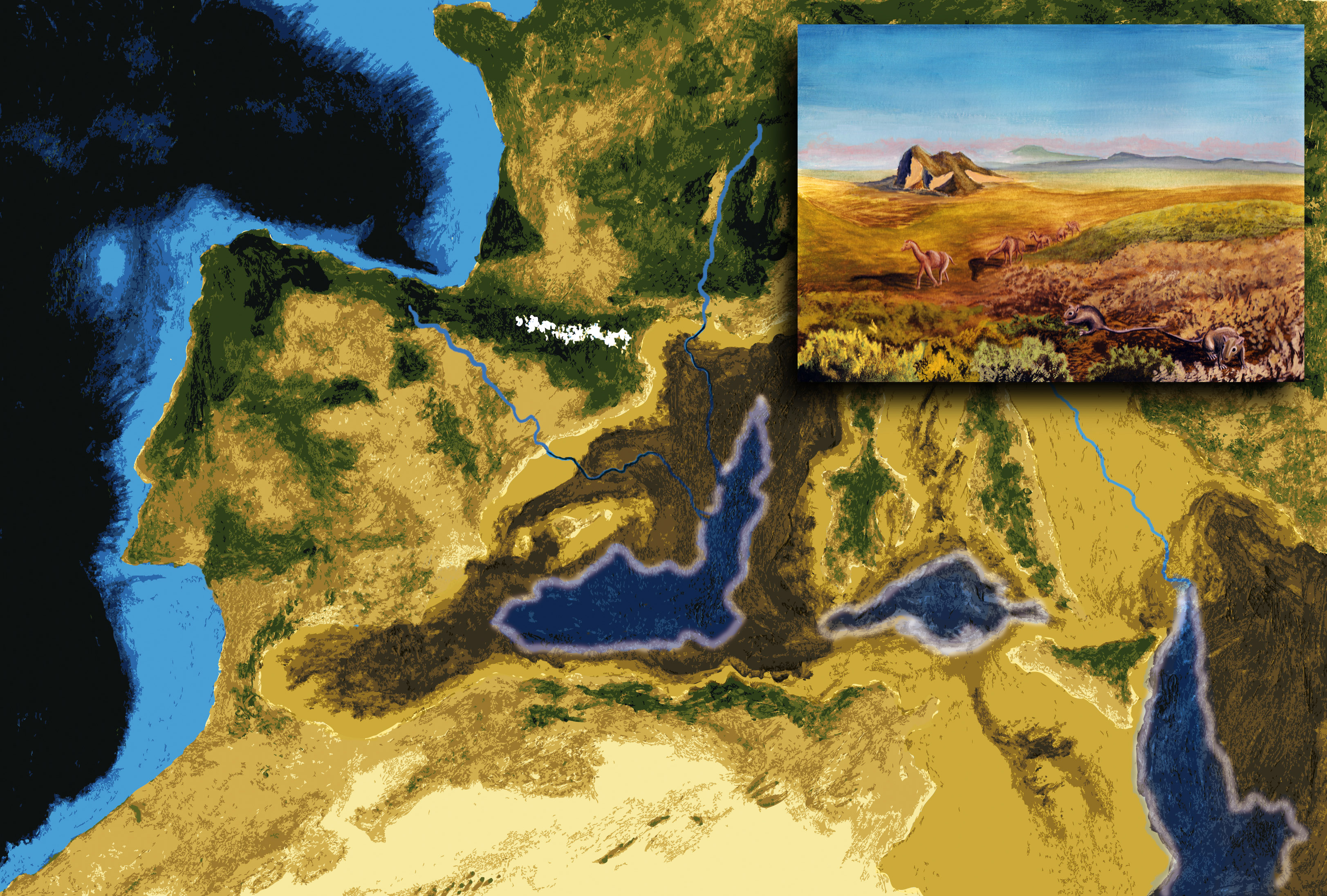
Artistic interpretation of the Mediterranean geography during its evaporative drawdown, after complete disconnection from the Atlantic. The rivers carved deep gorges in the exposed continental margins; the concentration of salt in the remaining water bodies led to rapid precipitation of the salt. The inset evokes the transit of mammals (e.g. camels and mice) from Africa to Iberia across the exposed Gibraltar Strait.

The Messinian salinity crisis (also referred to as the Messinian event, and in its latest stage as the Lago Mare event) was an event in which the Mediterranean Sea dried up, in a cycle of partial or nearly complete desiccation throughout the latter part of the Messinian age of the Miocene epoch, from 5.96 to 5.33 Ma (million years ago). It ended with the Zanclean flood, when the Atlantic reclaimed the basin.

Neogene graphical timeline
← / Messinian salinity crisis; ← / North American prairie expands
Subdivision of the Neogene according to the ICS, as of 2024. Vertical axis scale: Millions of years ago

Sediment samples from below the deep seafloor of the Mediterranean Sea, which include evaporite minerals, soils, and fossil plants, show that the precursor of the Strait of Gibraltar closed about 5.96 million years ago, sealing the Mediterranean off from the Atlantic. This resulted in a period of partial desiccation of the Mediterranean Sea, the first of several such periods during the late Miocene. After the strait closed for the last time around 5.6 Ma, the region's generally dry climate at the time dried the Mediterranean basin out nearly completely within a thousand years. This massive desiccation left a deep dry basin, reaching 3 to 5 km (1.9 to 3.1 mi) deep below normal sea level, with a few hypersaline pockets similar to today's Dead Sea. Then, around 5.5 Ma, wetter climatic conditions resulted in the basin receiving more fresh water from rivers, progressively filling and diluting the hypersaline lakes into larger pockets of brackish water (much like today's Caspian Sea). The Messinian salinity crisis ended with the Strait of Gibraltar finally reopening 5.33 Ma, when the Atlantic rapidly filled up the Mediterranean basin in what is known as the Zanclean flood.

Even today, the Mediterranean is considerably saltier than the North Atlantic, owing to its near isolation by the Strait of Gibraltar and its high rate of evaporation. If the Strait of Gibraltar closes again (which is likely to happen in the near future in geological time), the Mediterranean would mostly evaporate in about a thousand years, after which continued northward movement of Africa may close up the Mediterranean basin entirely.

Only the inflow of Atlantic water maintains the present Mediterranean level. When that was shut off sometime between 6.5 to 6 MYBP, net evaporative loss set in at the rate of around 3,300 cubic kilometres yearly. At that rate, the 3.7 million cubic kilometres of water in the basin would dry up in scarcely more than a thousand years, leaving an extensive layer of salt some tens of metres thick and raising global sea level about 12 metres.

== Naming and first evidence ==
In the 19th century, the Swiss geologist and paleontologist Karl Mayer-Eymar (1826–1907) studied fossils embedded between gypsum-bearing, brackish, and freshwater sediment layers, and identified them as having been deposited just before the end of the Miocene Epoch. In 1867, he named the period the Messinian after the city of Messina in Sicily, Italy. Since then, several other salt-rich and gypsum-rich evaporite layers throughout the Mediterranean region have been dated to the same period.

== Further evidence and confirmation ==
Seismic surveying of the Mediterranean basin in 1961 revealed a geological feature some 100–200 m (330–660 ft) below the seafloor. This feature, dubbed the M reflector, closely followed the contours of the present seafloor, suggesting that it was laid down evenly and consistently at some point in the past. The origin of this layer was largely interpreted as related to salt deposition. However, different interpretations were proposed for the age of salt and its deposition.

Earlier suggestions from Denizot in 1952 and Ruggieri in 1967 proposed that this layer was of Late Miocene age, and the same Ruggieri coined the term Messinian salinity crisis.

New and high-quality seismic data on the M-reflector were acquired in the Mediterranean Basin in 1970. At the same time, the salt was cored during Leg 13 of the Deep Sea Drilling Project conducted from the Glomar Challenger under the supervision of co-chief scientists William B. F. Ryan and Kenneth Hsu. These deposits were dated and interpreted for the first time as deep-basin products of the Messinian salinity crisis.

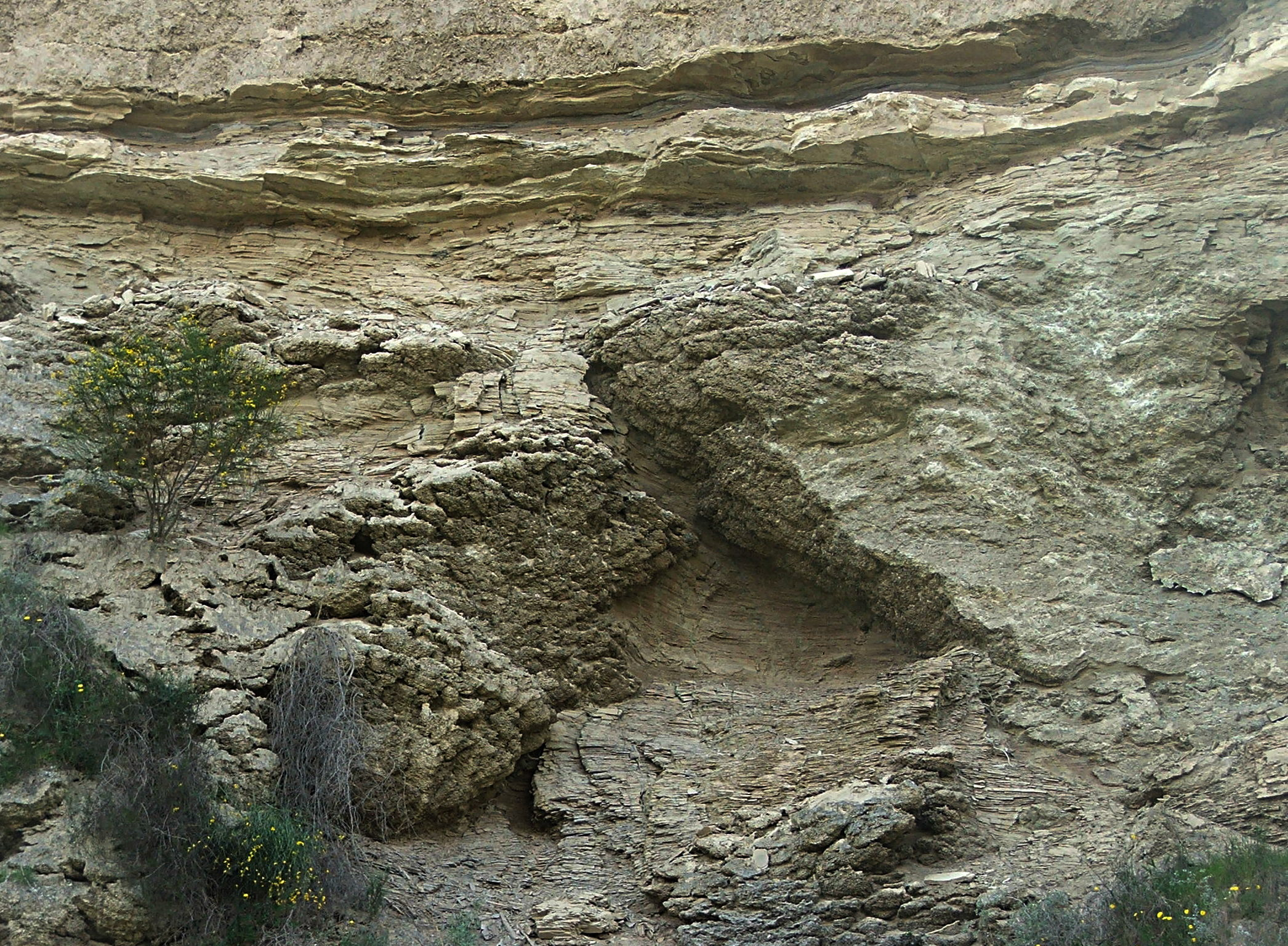
Cones of gypsum, which formed on the sea floor as a result of evaporation. Evaporation of one metre of seawater precipitates around 1 mm of gypsum.

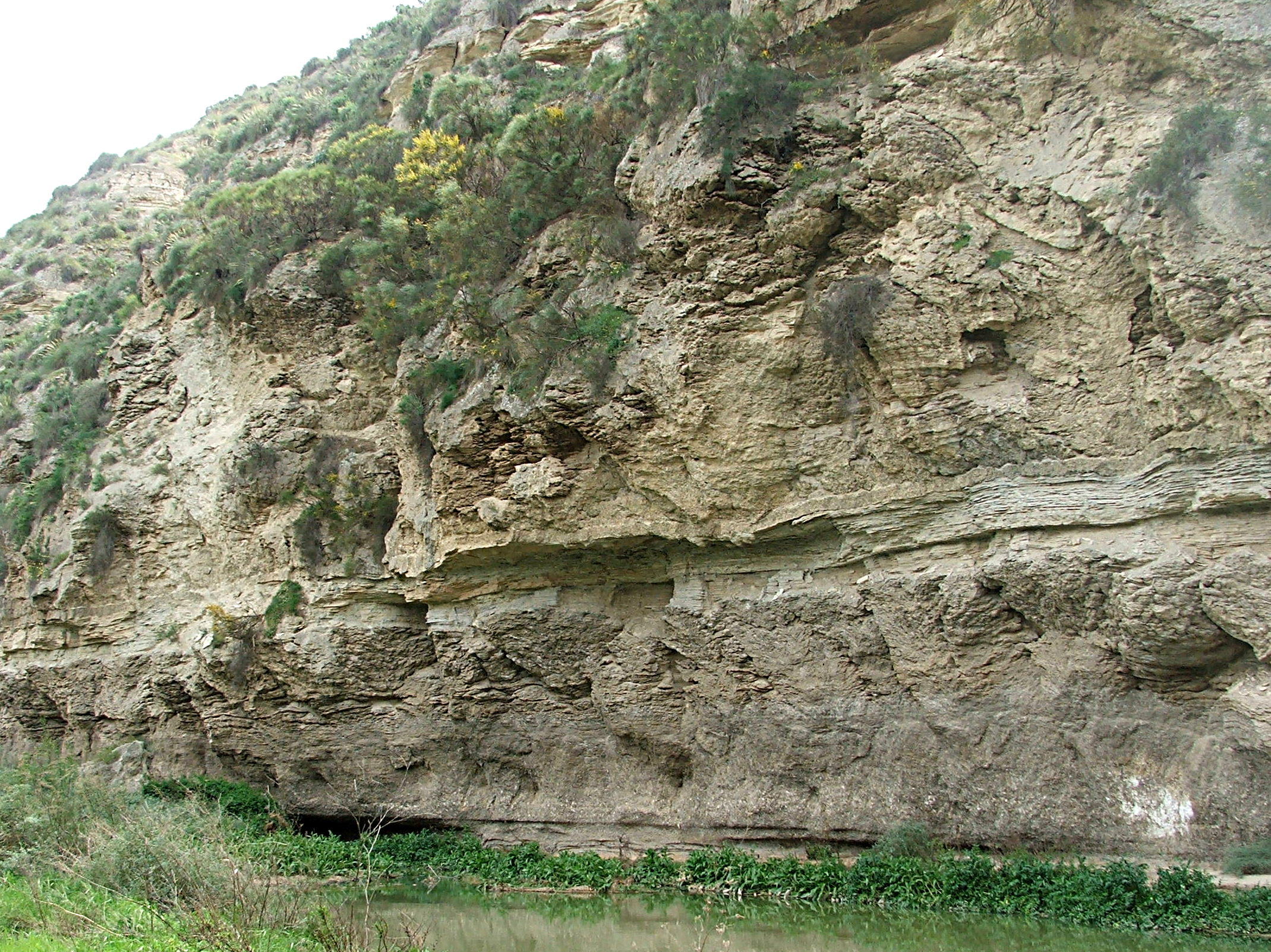
The scale of gypsum formation in the Sorbas Basin (Yesares member). The upward-growing cones suggest precipitation on the sea floor (not within sediments).

The first drilling of the Messinian salt at the deeper parts of the Mediterranean Sea came in the summer of 1970, when geologists aboard the Glomar Challenger brought up drill cores containing arroyo gravels and red and green floodplain silts; and gypsum, anhydrite, rock salt, and various other evaporite minerals that often form from drying of brine or seawater, including in a few places potash, left where the last bitter, mineral-rich waters dried up. One drill core contained a wind-blown cross-bedded deposit of deep-sea foraminiferal ooze that had dried into dust and been blown about on the hot dry abyssal plain by sandstorms, mixed with quartz sand blown in from nearby continents, and ended up in a brine lake interbedded between two layers of halite. These layers alternated with layers containing marine fossils, indicating a succession of drying and flooding periods.

The massive presence of salt does not require a desiccation of the sea. The main evidence for the evaporative drawdown of the Mediterranean comes from the remains of many (now submerged) canyons that were cut into the sides of the dry Mediterranean basin by rivers flowing down to the abyssal plain. For example, the Nile cut its bed down to 200 metres (660 feet) below sea level at Aswan (where Ivan S. Chumakov found marine Pliocene Foraminifera in 1967), and 2,500 m (8,200 ft) below sea level just north of Cairo.

In many places in the Mediterranean, fossilized cracks have been found where muddy sediment had dried and cracked in the sunlight and drought. In the Western Mediterranean series, the presence of pelagic oozes interbedded within the evaporites suggests that the area was repeatedly flooded and desiccated over 700,000 years.

== Chronology ==
A possible palaeogeographical reconstruction of the west end of the Miocene Mediterranean. North to the left.: Current coastline; S Sorbas basin, Spain; R Rifean corridor; B Betic corridor; G Strait of Gibraltar; M Mediterranean Sea

Based on palaeomagnetic datings of Messinian deposits that have since been brought above sea level by tectonic activity, the salinity crisis started at the same time over all the Mediterranean basin, at 5.96 ± 0.02 million years ago. This episode comprises the second part of what is called the "Messinian" age of the Miocene epoch. This age was characterised by several stages of tectonic activity and sea level fluctuations, as well as erosional and depositional events, all more or less interrelated.

The Mediterranean–Atlantic strait closed tight time and time again, and the Mediterranean Sea, for the first time and then repeatedly, partially desiccated. The basin was finally isolated from the Atlantic Ocean for a longer period, between 5.59 and 5.33 million years ago, resulting in a large or smaller (depending on the scientific model applied) lowering of the Mediterranean sea level. During the initial, very dry stages (5.6–5.5 Ma), there was extensive erosion, creating several huge canyon systems (some similar in scale to the Grand Canyon) around the Mediterranean. Later stages (5.50–5.33 Ma) are marked by cyclic evaporite deposition into a large "lake-sea" basin ("Lago Mare" event).

About 5.33 million years ago, at the start of the Zanclean age (at the start of the Pliocene epoch), the barrier at the Strait of Gibraltar broke one last time, re-flooding the Mediterranean basin in the Zanclean flood, favouring slope destabilization. The basin has not desiccated since.

=== Several cycles ===
The amount of Messinian salts has been estimated as around 4×10^{18} kg (but this estimate may be reduced by 50 to 75% when more information becomes available) and more than 1 million cubic kilometres, 50 times the amount of salt normally in the Mediterranean waters. This suggests either a succession of desiccations or a long period of hypersalinity during which incoming water from the Atlantic Ocean was evaporated with the level of the Mediterranean brine being similar to that of the Atlantic. The nature of the strata points strongly to several cycles of the Mediterranean Sea completely drying and being refilled, with drying periods correlating to periods of cooler global temperatures, which were therefore drier in the Mediterranean region. Each refilling was presumably caused by a seawater inlet opening, either tectonically, or by a river flowing eastwards below sea level into the "Mediterranean Sink" cutting its valley head back west until it let the sea in, similarly to a river capture. The last refilling was at the Miocene/Pliocene boundary, when the Strait of Gibraltar broke wide open permanently. Upon closely examining the Hole 124 core, Kenneth J. Hsu found that:

The oldest sediment of each cycle was either deposited in a deep sea or in a great brackish lake. The fine sediments deposited on a quiet or deep bottom had perfectly even lamination. As the basin was drying up and the water depth decreased, lamination became more irregular on account of increasing wave agitation. Stromatolite was formed then, when the site of deposition fell within an intertidal zone. The intertidal flat was eventually exposed by the final desiccation, at which time anhydrite was precipitated by saline ground water underlying sabkhas. Suddenly seawater would spill over the Strait of Gibraltar, or there would be an unusual influx of brackish water from the eastern European lake. The Balearic abyssal plain would then again be under water. The chicken-wire anhydrite would thus be abruptly buried under the fine muds brought in by the next deluge.

Research since then has suggested that the desiccation-flooding cycle may have repeated several times during the last 630,000 years of the Miocene epoch. This could explain the large amount of salt deposited. Recent studies, however, show that the repeated desiccation and flooding is unlikely from a geodynamic point of view.

=== Synchronism versus diachronism—deep water versus shallow water evaporites ===
Hypotheses of evaporite formation during the MSC.: 1. Diachronous deposition: Evaporites (pink) were deposited in landward basins first, and closer to the Atlantic as the extent of the Mediterranean Sea (dark blue) diminished towards the gateway. The light blue shows the original sea level.; 2. Synchronous deposition in marginal basins. Sea level drops slightly, but the whole basin is still connected to the Atlantic. Reduced inflow allows the accumulation of evaporites in shallow basins only.; 3. Synchronous, basin-wide deposition. Closure or restriction of the Atlantic seaway by tectonic activity (dark grey) causes evaporite deposition simultaneously across the entire basin; the basin may not need to empty completely, as salts are concentrated by evaporation.

Some major questions remain concerning the beginning of the crisis in the central Mediterranean Basin. The geometric physical link between the evaporitic series identified in marginal basins accessible for field studies, such as the Tabernas Desert and Sorbas Basin, and the evaporitic series of the central basins has never been made.

Using the concept of deposition in both shallow and deep basins during the Messinian (i.e. assuming that both Basin types existed during this period), two major groupings are evident: one that favours a synchronous deposition (image c) of the first evaporites in all the basins before the major phase of erosion; and the other that favours a diachronous deposition (image a) of the evaporites through more than one phases of desiccation which would first have affected the marginal basins and later the central basins.

Another school suggests that desiccation was synchronous, but occurred mainly in shallower basins. This model would suggest that the sea level of the whole Mediterranean basin fell at once, but only shallower basins dried out enough to deposit salt beds. See image b.

As highlighted in the work of van Dijk (1992) and van Dijk et al. (1998) the history of desiccation and erosion was complexly interacting with tectonic uplift and subsidence events, and erosional episodes. They also questioned again like some previous authors had done, whether the basins now observed as "deep" were actually also deep during the Messinian Episode and gave different names to the end-member scenarios described above.

Distinguishing between these hypotheses requires the calibration of gypsum deposits. Gypsum is the first salt (calcium sulphate) to be deposited from a desiccating basin. Magnetostratigraphy offers a broad constraint on timing, but no fine detail. Therefore, cyclostratigraphy is relied upon to compare the dates of sediments. The typical case study compares the gypsum evaporites in the main Mediterranean basin with those of the Sorbas basin, a smaller basin on the flanks of the Mediterranean Sea that is now exposed in southern Spain. The relationship between these two basins is assumed to represent the relationships of the wider region.

Recent work has relied on cyclostratigraphy to correlate the underlying marl beds, which appear to have given way to gypsum at exactly the same time in both basins.

The proponents of this hypothesis claim that cyclic variations in bed compositions are astronomically tuned, and the beds' magnitude can be calibrated to show they were contemporaneous—a strong argument. In order to refute it, it is necessary to propose an alternative mechanism for generating these cyclic bands, or for erosion to have coincidentally removed just the right amount of sediment everywhere before the gypsum was deposited. The proponents claim that the gypsum was deposited directly above the correlated marl layers, and slumped into them, giving the appearance of an unconformable contact. However, their opponents seize upon this apparent inconformity, and claim that the Sorbas Basin was exposed—therefore eroding—while the Mediterranean sea was depositing evaporites. This would result in the Sorbas Basin being filled with evaporites at 5.5 million years ago (Ma), compared to the main basin at 5.96 Ma.).

Recent works have highlighted a pre-evaporite phase corresponding to a prominent erosional crisis (also named "Messinian erosional crisis"; the termination of the "Mes-1" unconformity bound depositional sequence of van Dijk, 1992) responding to a major drawdown of the Mediterranean seawater.

Assuming that this major drawdown corresponds to the major Messinian drawdown, they concluded that the Mediterranean bathymetry significantly decreased before the precipitation of central basins evaporites. Regarding these works, a deep water formation seems unlikely. The assumption that central basin evaporites partly deposited under a high bathymetry and before the major phase of erosion should imply the observation of a major detritic event above evaporites in the basin. Such a depositional geometry has not been observed on data. This theory corresponds to one of the end-member scenarios discussed by van Dijk et al.

== Causes ==
Several possible causes of the series of Messinian crises have been considered. While there is disagreement on all fronts, the most general consensus seems to agree that climate had a role in forcing the periodic filling and emptying of the basins, and that tectonic factors must have played a part in controlling the height of the sills restricting flow between the Atlantic and Mediterranean. The magnitude and extent of these effects, however, is widely open to interpretation.

In any case, the causes of the closing and isolation of the Mediterranean Sea from the Atlantic Ocean must be found in the area where the Strait of Gibraltar is now, the location of one of the tectonic boundaries between the African plate and the European plate and its southern fragments such as the Iberian plate. This boundary zone is characterised by an arc-shaped tectonic feature, the Gibraltar Arc, which includes southern Spain and northern Africa. In the present day area of the Mediterranean Sea, are three of these arc-shaped belts: the Gibraltar Arc, the Calabrian Arc, and the Aegean Arc. The kinematics and dynamics of this plate boundary and of the Gibraltar Arc during the late Miocene are closely related to the causes of the Messinian salinity crisis. Tectonic movements may have closed and re-opened passages, as the region where the connection with the Atlantic Ocean was situated is permeated by strike-slip faults and rotating blocks of continental crust. As faulting accommodated the regional compression caused by Africa's convergence with Eurasia, the geography of the region may have altered enough to open and close seaways. However, the precise tectonic activity behind the motion can be interpreted in a number of ways.

Any model must explain a variety of features of the area:

- Shortening and extension occur at the same time in close proximity; sedimentary sequences and their relations to fault activity constrain the rates of uplift and subsidence quite precisely
- Fault-bounded continental blocks can often be observed to rotate
- The depth and structure of the lithosphere is constrained by records of seismic activity, as well as tomography
- The composition of igneous rocks varies; this constrains the location and extent of any subduction.

There are three contending geodynamic models that may fit the data, models which have been discussed in an equal way for the other arc shaped features in the Mediterranean:

- A moving subduction zone may have caused periodic regional uplift. Changes in volcanic rocks suggest that subduction zones at the rim of the Tethys Sea may have rolled back westwards, changing the chemistry and density in magma underlying the western Mediterranean. However, this does not account for the periodic emptying and refilling of the basin.
- The same features can be explained by regional delamination or the loss of a layer of the entire lithosphere.
- Deblobbing, the loss of a "blob" of lithospheric mantle, and the subsequent upward motion of the overlying crust (which has lost its dense mantle "anchor") may also have caused the observed phenomena although the validity of the "deblobbing" hypothesis has been called into question.

Of these, only the first model, invoking rollback, seems to explain the rotations observed. However, it is difficult to fit it with the pressure and temperature histories of some metamorphic rocks.

This has led to some interesting combinations of the models which at first hand looked bizarre, in attempts to approach the true state of affairs.

Changes in climate must almost certainly be invoked to explain the periodic nature of the events. They occur during cool periods of Milankovic cycles, when less solar energy reached the northern hemisphere. This led to less evaporation of the North Atlantic, hence less rainfall over the Mediterranean. This would have starved the basin of water supply from rivers and allowed its desiccation.

Glacioeustatic sea level falls with an amplitude of around 10 metres (33 ft) that began approximately 6.14 Ma were likely responsible for modulating the connection between the Mediterranean and the Atlantic. One particularly major glacioeustatic fluctuation, a sea level drop of about 30 metres (98 ft), occurred around 5.26 Ma, around the Miocene-Pliocene boundary.

== Relationship to climate ==
The climate of the abyssal plain during the drought is unknown. There is no situation on Earth directly comparable to the dry Mediterranean, and thus it is not possible to know its climate by direct observation of comparable geographic settings. Simulation using a general circulation model can indicate physically consistent responses to the desiccation. There is no consensus as to whether the Mediterranean Sea dried out completely; it seems likeliest that at least three or four large brine lakes on the abyssal plains remained at all times. The extent of desiccation is very hard to judge, owing to the reflective seismic nature of the salt beds, and the difficulty in drilling cores, making it difficult to map their thickness.

Atmospheric forces can be studied to arrive at a speculation on the climate. As winds blew across the "Mediterranean Sink", they would heat or cool adiabatically with altitude. In the empty Mediterranean Basin, the summertime temperatures would probably have been extremely high. As a first approximation, using the dry adiabatic lapse rate of around 10 °C (18 °F) per kilometre, the maximum possible temperature of an area 4 km (2.5 mi) below sea level would be about 40 °C (72 °F) warmer than it would be at sea level. Under this extreme assumption, maxima would be near 80 °C (176 °F) at the lowest points of the dry abyssal plain, permitting no permanent life but extremophiles. Further, the altitude 3–5 km (2–3 mi) below sea level would result in 1.45 to 1.71 atm (1102 to 1300 mmHg) air pressure, further increasing heat stress. However, these simple estimates are likely far too extreme. Murphy et al.'s 2009 general circulation model experiments showed that for completely desiccated conditions, the Mediterranean basin would warm by up to 15 °C (27 °F) in summer and 4 °C (7.2 °F) in winter, while for a depressed water surface, temperatures would warm by only about 4 °C (7.2 °F) in summer and 5 °C (9.0 °F) in winter. In addition, the model results indicated global stationary wave response to the introduction of the topographic depression causes patterns of warming and cooling by up to 4 °C (7.2 °F) around the Northern Hemisphere.

Today the evaporation from the Mediterranean Sea supplies moisture that falls in frontal storms, but without such moisture, the Mediterranean climate that we associate with Italy, Greece, and the Levant would be limited to the Iberian Peninsula and the western Maghreb. Climates throughout the central and eastern basin of the Mediterranean and surrounding regions to the north and east would have been drier even above modern sea level. The eastern Alps, the Balkans, and the Hungarian plain would also be much drier than they are today, even if the westerlies prevailed as they do now. However, the Paratethys ocean provided water to the area north of the Mediterranean basin. The Wallachian-Pontic and Hungarian basins were underwater during the Miocene, modifying the climate of what is now the Balkans and other areas north of the Mediterranean basin. The Pannonian Sea was a source of water north of the Mediterranean basin until the middle Pleistocene before becoming the Hungarian plain. Debate exists whether the waters of the Wallachian-Pontic basin (and the possibly connected Pannonian Sea) would have had access (thus bringing water) to at least the eastern Mediterranean basin at times during the Miocene.

== Effects ==
=== Effects on biology ===
The Messinian salinity crisis resulted in major extinctions of marine fish and other marine fauna native to the basin. The present day biodiversity gradient of the Mediterranean, where diversity decreases eastward, developed after the crisis. The land mammal faunas of the Mediterranean also suffered diversity losses. Due to the fusion of the Iberian Peninsula and North Africa, a faunal interchange between the two regions occurred. The crisis also allowed the dispersal of terrestrial animals to remote landmasses such as the Balearic Islands, where several animal species, such as the goat-antelope Myotragus, would continue to be isolated until the Holocene, over 5 million years later.

Messinian salinity crisis animation

=== Dehydrated geography ===
The notion of a completely waterless Mediterranean Sea has some corollaries.

- At the time, the Strait of Gibraltar was not open, but other seaways (the Betic corridor to the north where the Sierra Nevada or Baetic Cordillera is now, or to the south where the Rifean corridor or corridors where the Rif Mountains are now) linked the Mediterranean to the Atlantic. These must have closed, isolating the basin from the open ocean.
- The high level of salinity cannot be tolerated by many known organisms, a factor in reducing the biodiversity of much of the basin.
- The basin's low altitude would have made it extremely hot during the summer through adiabatic heating, a conclusion supported by the presence of anhydrite, which is only deposited in water warmer than 35 °C (95 °F).
- Rivers emptying into the basin would have cut their beds much deeper (at least a further 2,400 m (7,900 ft) in the case of the Nile, as the buried canyon under Cairo shows) and in the Rhone valley.

There is an opinion that during the Messinian, the Red Sea was connected at Suez to the Mediterranean, but was not connected with the Indian Ocean, and dried out along with the Mediterranean.

== Replenishment ==
When the Strait of Gibraltar was ultimately breached, the Atlantic Ocean would have poured a vast volume of water through what would have presumably been a relatively narrow channel. This refill has been envisaged as resulting in a large waterfall higher than today's Angel Falls at 979 m (3,212 ft), and far more powerful than either the Iguazu Falls or the Niagara Falls, but recent studies of the underground structures at the Gibraltar Strait show that the flooding channel descended in a rather gradual way to the dry Mediterranean.

An enormous deposit of unsorted debris washed in by a massive catastrophic flood-wash has been found in the seabed southeast of the south corner of Sicily. This is suspected to have been deposited by the Zanclean flood.

== See also ==
- Messinian evaporite
- Atlantropa
- xkcd 1190
