= Brine pool =

Accumulation of brine in a seafloor depression

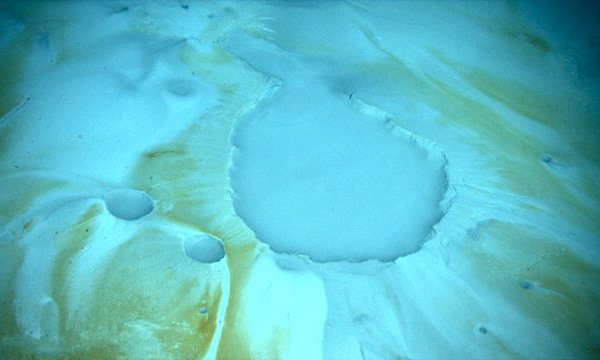
These craters mark the formation of brine pools where salt has seeped through the sea floor and encrusted the nearby substrate.

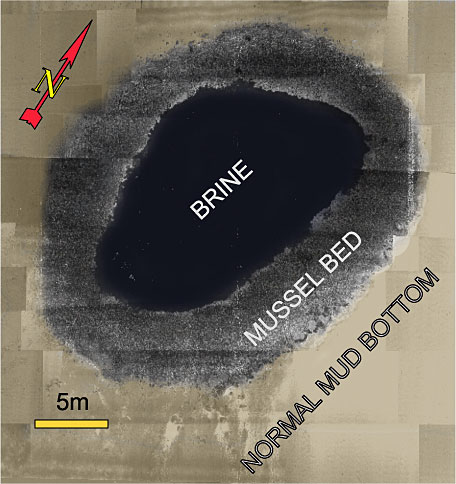
NOAA rendering of a brine pool in the Gulf of Mexico

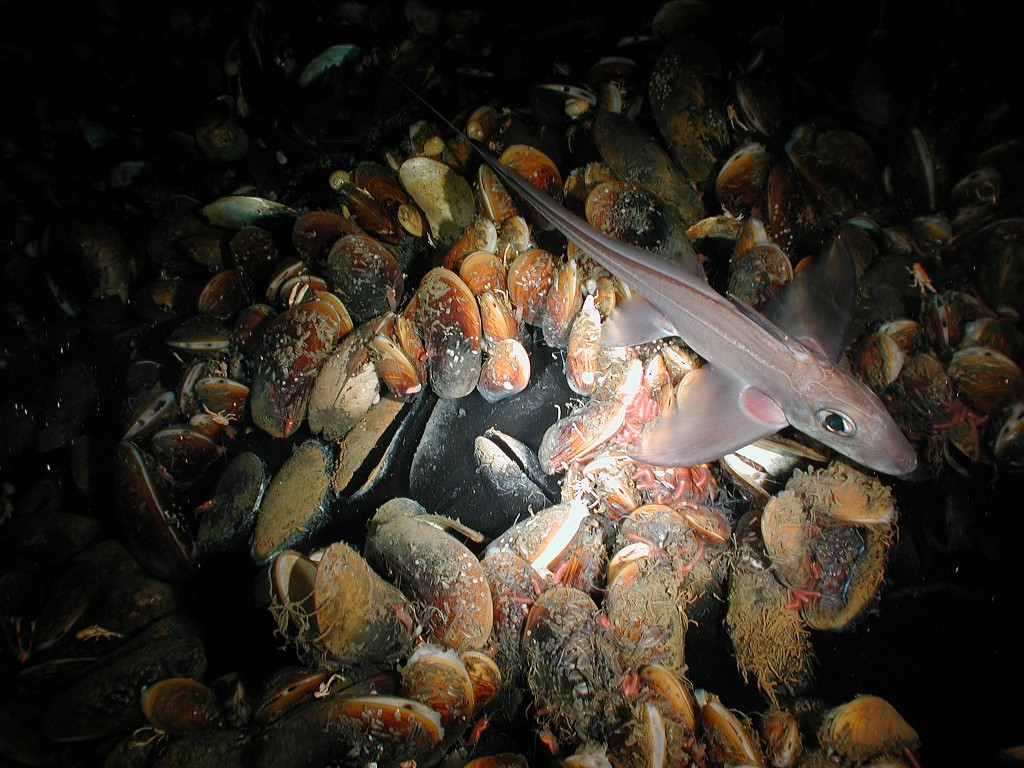
Chimaeridae fish and seep mussels at edge of brine pool

A brine pool, sometimes called an underwater lake, deepwater lake or brine lake, is a volume of brine collected in a seafloor depression. These pools are dense bodies of water that have a salinity that is typically three to eight times greater than the surrounding ocean. Brine pools are commonly found below polar sea ice and in the deep ocean. This below-sea ice forms through a process called brine rejection. For deep-sea brine pools, salt is necessary to increase the salinity gradient. The salt can come from one of two processes: the dissolution of large salt deposits through salt tectonics or geothermally-heated brine issued from tectonic spreading centers.

The brine often contains high concentrations of hydrogen sulfide and methane, which provide energy to chemosynthetic organisms that live near the pool. These creatures are often extremophiles and symbionts. Deep-sea and polar brine pools are toxic to marine animals due to their high salinity and anoxic properties, which can ultimately lead to toxic shock and possibly death.

== Characteristics ==
Brine pools are sometimes called sea floor "lakes" because the dense brine does not easily mix with overlying seawater, creating a distinct interface between water masses. The pools range in area from less than 1 square metre (11 sq ft) to as large as the 120-square-kilometre (46 sq mi) Orca Basin. Depending on concentration, some minerals such as baryte (barium sulfate) precipitate out of the brine and form crystalline crusts around the edge of the pool.

Because of the brine's high density and lack of mixing currents in the deep ocean, brine pools often become anoxic and deadly to respiring organisms. Brine pools supporting chemosynthetic activity, however, form life on the pool's shores where bacteria and their symbionts grow near the highest concentrations of nutrient release. Patchy, reddish layers can be observed floating above the dense brine interface due to high densities of halophilic archaea that are supported by these environments. These shores are complex environments with significant shifts in salinity, oxygen concentration, pH, and temperature over a relatively small vertical scale. These transitions provide a variety of environmental niches.

== Formation ==
Brine pools are created through three primary methods: brine rejection below sea ice, dissolution of salts into bottom water through salt tectonics, and geothermal heating of brine at tectonic boundaries and hot spots.

1. Brine rejection: When sea water freezes, salts do not fit into the crystalline structure of ice, so the salts are expelled. The expelled salts form a cold, dense brine that sinks below the sea ice to the sea floor. Brine rejection on an oceanic scale is associated with the formation of North Atlantic Deep Water (NADW) and Antarctic Bottom Water (AABW), which play a large role in global thermohaline circulation (THC). On a localized scale, that rejected brine collects in seafloor depressions, forming a brine pool. In the absence of mixing, the brine will become anoxic in a matter of weeks.
2. Salt tectonics: During the Middle Jurassic period, the Gulf of Mexico was a shallow sea that dried out, producing a thick layer of salt and seawater-derived minerals up to 8 km thick. When the Gulf refilled with water, the salt layer was preserved from dissolution by sediments accumulating over the salt. Subsequent sedimentation layers became so heavy that they began to deform and move the more malleable salt layer below. In some places, the salt layer now protrudes at or near the seafloor, where it can interact with seawater. Where seawater comes in contact with the salt, the deposits dissolve and form brines. The location of these surfacing Jurassic-period salt deposits is also associated with methane releases, giving deep-ocean brine pools their chemical characteristics.
3. Geothermal heating: At earth's oceanic tectonic spreading centers, plates are moving apart, allowing new magma to rise and cool. This process is involved in creating new sea floor. These mid-ocean ridges allow seawater to seep downward into fractures, where they come in contact with and dissolve minerals. In the Red Sea, for example, Red Sea Deep Water (RSDW) seeps into the fissures created at the tectonic boundary. The water dissolves salts from deposits created in the Miocene epoch much like the Jurassic-period deposits in the Gulf of Mexico. The resulting brine is then superheated in the hydrothermal active zone over the magma chamber. The heated brine rises to the seafloor, where it cools and settles in depressions as brine pools. The locations of these pools are also associated with methane, hydrogen sulfide, and other chemical releases, setting the stage for chemosynthetic activity.

== Support of life ==
Due to the methods of their formation and lack of mixing, brine pools are anoxic and deadly to aerobic organisms, including most eukaryotes and multicellular organisms. When an organism enters a brine pool, it attempts to "breathe" the environment and experiences cerebral hypoxia due to the lack of oxygen and toxic shock from the hypersalinity. Organisms that cannot surface long enough to retreat to the rim quickly die. When observed by submarines or remotely operated underwater vehicles (ROVs), brine pools are found to be littered with dead fish, crabs, amphipods, and various other organisms that ventured too far into the brine. Dead organisms are then preserved in the brine for years without decay due to the anoxic nature of the pool.

Despite the harsh conditions, life in the form of macrofauna such as bivalves can be found in a thin area along the rim of a brine pool. A novel genus and species of bivalves, known as Apachecorbula muriatica, has been found along the edge of the "Valdivia Deep" brine pool in the Red Sea. There have also been recorded instances of macrofauna brine pools at the seawater interface. Inactive sulfur chimneys have been found with affiliated epifauna such as polychaetes and hydroids. Fauna like gastropods, capitellid polychaetes, and top snails have also been found to be associated with brine pools in the Red Sea. Such species typically feed on microbial symbionts or bacterial and detritus films.

While organisms can typically flourish on the outskirts of a brine pool, they are not always safe from harm there. One possible reason for this is that underwater landslides can impact brine pools and cause waves of hypersaline brine to spill out into surrounding basins, thus negatively affecting the biological communities which live there.

Despite their inhospitable nature, brine pools can also provide a home, allowing organisms to flourish. Deep-sea brine pools often coincide with cold seep activity, allowing for chemosynthetic life to thrive. Methane and hydrogen sulfide released by the seep is processed by bacteria, which have a symbiotic relationship with organisms such as seep mussels. The seep mussels create two distinct zones: the inner zone, which is at the edge of the pool, provides the best physiological conditions and allows for maximum growth, while the outer zone is near the transition between the mussel bed and the surrounding seafloor, and this area provides the worst conditions, causing these mussels to have lower maximum sizes and densities. This ecosystem is dependent on chemical energy and, relative to almost all other life on Earth, has no dependence on energy from the Sun.

An important part of the study of extreme environments such as brine pools is the function and survival of microbes. Microbes help support the larger biological community around environments like brine pools and are key to understanding the survival of other extremophiles. Biofilms contribute to the creation of microbes and are considered the foundation by which other micro-organisms can survive in extreme environments. The research into the growth and function of artificial extremophile biofilms has been slow due to the difficulty in recreating the extreme deep-sea environments they are found in.

== Microbial diversity and community composition ==
=== Microbial composition ===
Red Sea brine pool microbiology is among the most intensively studied using metagenomics and amplicon sequencing.

==== Metagenomic analysis ====
Metagenomic analysis is a powerful approach for characterizing microbial communities in a variety of environments. Previously, genetic analysis required having the microorganisms in culture, which is problematic since most microorganisms in nature have not been cultivated. Metagenomics overcomes these problems by allowing researchers to directly sample and analyze and genetically characterize microbial communities sampled from the desired environment. Metagenomic analyses has revealed previously-uncharacterized microbial communities in multiple brine pools.

==== Main clades ====
The taxonomic makeup of the main microbial communities found at Atlantis II and Discovery without including minor or unknown species to avoid ambiguity is summarized in the following list that is based on the data from primary articles.{6,7}

Domain	Microbes
Bacteria	[Order] Actinomycetales
Bacteria	[Family] Microbacteriaceae
Bacteria	[Genus] Bacillus
Bacteria	[Phylum] Bacteroidetes
Bacteria	[Class] Flavobacteria
Bacteria	[Phylum] Candidatus division od1
Bacteria	[Phylum] Chloroflexi
Bacteria	[Class] Anaerolineae
Bacteria	[Class] SAR202 clade
Bacteria	[Phylum] Cyanobacteria
Bacteria	[Phylum] Deinococcota
Bacteria	[Genus] Meiothermus
Bacteria	[Class] Deferribacteres
Bacteria	[Phylum] Firmicutes
Bacteria	[Order] Thermotoaea
Bacteria	[Class] Candidatus Scalindua
Bacteria	[Class] Candidatus Brocadiales l
Bacteria	[Class] Alphaproteobacteria
Bacteria	[Genus] Phyllobacterium
Bacteria	[Genus] Afipia
Bacteria	[Genus] Bradyrhizobium
Bacteria	[Order] SAR11(Pelagibacterales)
Bacteria	[Class] Betaproteobacteria
Bacteria	[Genus] Rhodoferax
Bacteria	[Genus] Malikia
Bacteria	[Genus] Cupriavidus
Bacteria	[Genus] Ralstonia
Bacteria	[Class] Deltaproteobacteria
Bacteria	[Class] Gammaproteobacteria
Bacteria	[Order] Alteromonadales
Bacteria	[Order] Oceanospirillales
Bacteria	[Genus] Acinetobacter
Bacteria	[Genus] Alkanindiges
Bacteria	[Genus] Stenotrophomonas
Archaea	[Class] Group c3
Archaea	[Class] Marine benthic group a (MBG-A)
Archaea	[Class] Marine benthic group b (MBG-B)
Archaea	[Class] Marine group I (MGI)
Archaea	[Class] Misc crenarchaeotic group
Archaea	[Class] Psl12
Archaea	[Order] Desulfurococcales
Archaea	[Order] Sulfolobales
Archaea	[Order] Thermoproteales
Archaea	[Phylum] Euryarchaeota
Archaea	[Class] Archaeoglobi
Archaea	[Order] Archaeoglobales
Archaea	[Order] Halobacteria
Archaea	[Order] Halobacteriales
Archaea	[Class] Methanomicrobia
Archaea	[Order] Methanobacteriales
Archaea	[Order] Methanocellales
Archaea	[Order] Methanococcales
Archaea	[Order] Methanomicrobiales
Archaea	[Order] Methanopyrales
Archaea	[Order] Methanosarcinales
Archaea	[Class] Thermoplasmata
Archaea	[Genus] Candidatus Korarchaeum cryptofilum
Archaea	[Genus] Candidatus Caldiarchaeum

=== Environmental challenges and adaptations ===
The lack of mixing with the water column in combination with high salinity, anoxia, extremes in water temperature, and hydrostatic pressure results in microbial assemblages that are specific to these environments.

==== Challenges ====
The high salinity levels present challenges for the retention of water by cells and consequent effects on cell turgor and functioning. Brine pools also exert ionic, kosmotropic, and chaotropic effects on the cells, which also causes additional challenges for the organisms to survive these extreme environments.

In addition, the lack of oxygen increases the difficulty of organisms to yield energy, as oxygen is the most energy-yielding electron acceptor.

==== Adaptations ====
Organisms have developed different strategies to solve the challenges imposed by high levels of salinity. In order to decrease the risk of chaotropic effects on the cells, halophilic archaea have a "salt-in" approach and "compatible-solute" strategy, which increases intracellular ionic concentration (mostly K^{+}) to decrease the osmotic pressure; thus, these organisms have adapted their entire metabolic machinery to maintain salt concentration inside of their cells.

In some brine pools, high water temperatures and hydrostatic pressures result in piezophilic microorganisms that synthesize thermoprotective molecules (e.g. hydroxyketone) to prevent the denaturation of proteins and decrease the risk of desiccation.

Another important adaptation is the use of alternative electron acceptors to yield energy, such as iron, manganese, sulfate, elemental sulfur, carbon dioxide, nitrite, and nitrate.

Animals have also been found living in these anaerobic brine pools, such as the first known metazoan from these environments described by Danovaro et al. (2010). Many other taxa that from these extreme environments are still uncharacterized.

=== Nutrient cycling in brine pools ===
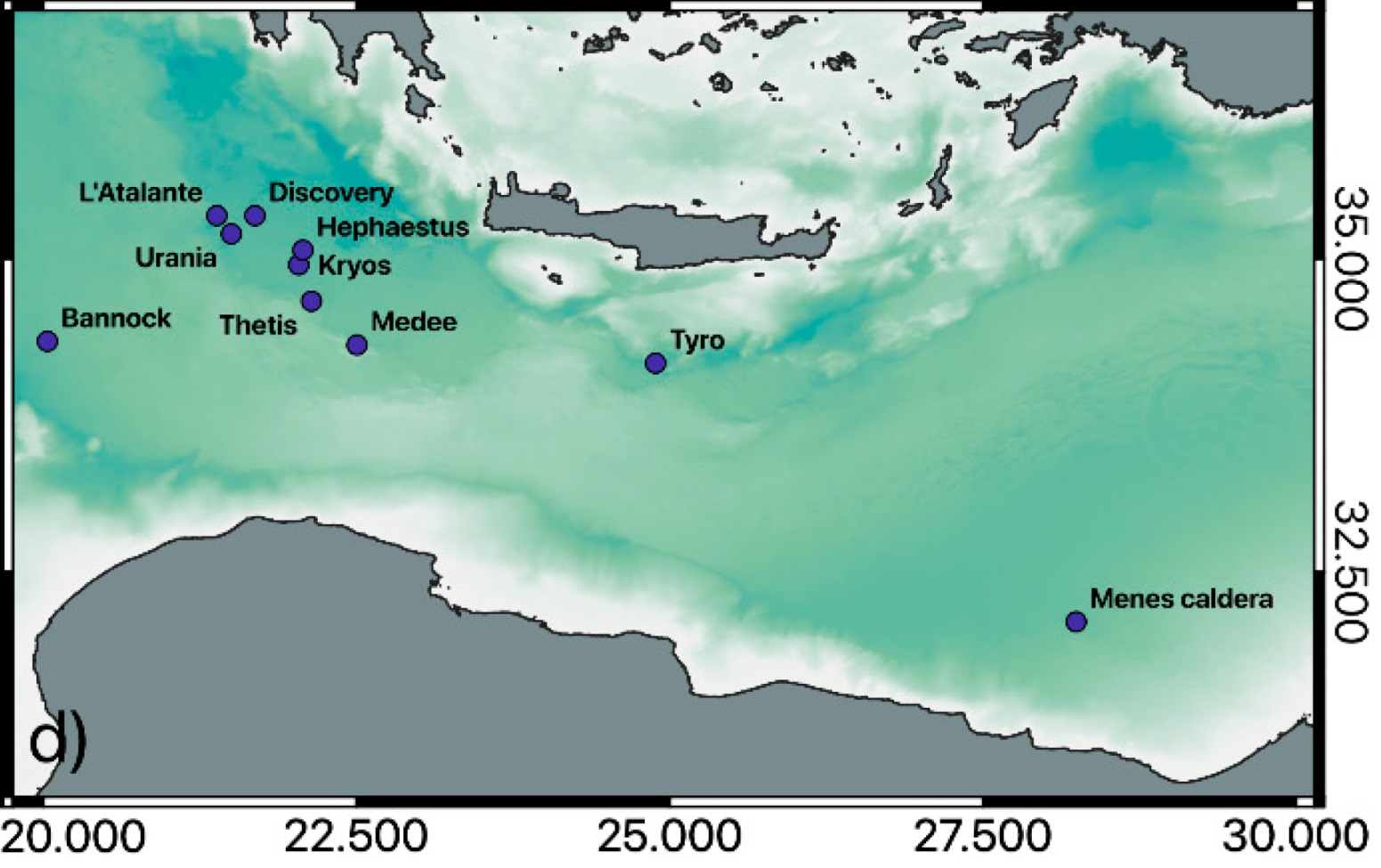
Distribution of deep hypersaline anoxic basins (DHABs) in the eastern Mediterranean Sea

==== Chemical composition and metabolic significance ====
As the name suggests, brine pools, or deep hypersaline anoxic basins (DHABs), are characterized by a very high salt concentration and anoxic conditions. Sodium, chloride, magnesium, potassium, and calcium ion concentrations are all extremely high in brine pools. Due to low mixing rates between the above seawater and the brine water, brine-pool water becomes anoxic within the first ten centimeters or so. While there are large variations in the geochemical composition of individual pools, as well as extreme chemical stratification within the same pool, conserved chemical trends are present. Deeper layers of DHABs will be saltier, hotter, more acidic, and more anaerobic than the preceding layers. The concentration of heavy metals (Fe, Mn, Si, Cu) and certain nutrients (NO_{2}^{−}, NH_{4}^{+}, NO_{3}^{−}, and PO_{4}^{−}) will tend to increase with depth, while the concentration of SO_{4}^{−} and both organic and inorganic carbon decrease with depth. While these trends are all observed to some capacity in DHABs, the intensity and distance over which these trends take effect can vary in depth from one meter to tens of meters.

The heavy stratification within DHABs has led to increased microbial metabolic diversity and varying cell concentrations between layers. The majority of cell biomass has been found at the interfaces between the distinct chemical layers (with the highest concentrations of cells located at the brine-surface interface). Microbes exploit the sharp chemical gradients between the layers to make their metabolisms more thermodynamically favorable.

Four heavily-studied DHABs are Urania, Bannock, L'Atalante, and Discovery. All four of these brine pools are located in the Mediterranean Sea, yet they all exhibit distinct chemical properties: Urania has the highest concentration of sulfuric acid observed (at c. 16 mM)—compared to normal sea water (2.6×10^{−6} mM) or the next highest [HS^{–}] in the Bannock basin (c. 3 mM). Discovery has an extremely low concentration of Na^{+} (68 mM) and an extremely high concentration of Mg^{2+} (4,995 mM)—compared to the surrounding seawater with concentrations of 528 mM and 60 mM respectively. The L'Atalante basin has a high SO_{4}^{2-} concentration compared to the other pools. This extreme variability in environmental conditions leads to each brine pool having a unique metabolic composition.

=== Main metabolisms and nutrient cycling ===
==== Carbon cycling ====
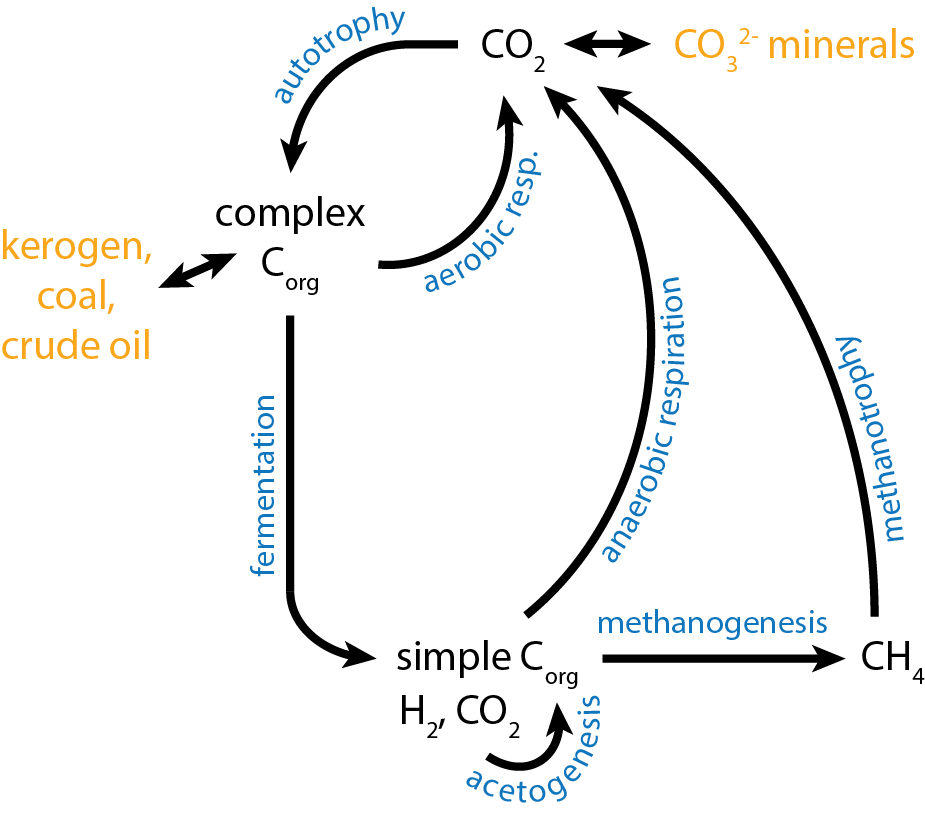
A simplified version of the organic carbon cycle

While it was initially thought that particulate organic matter (POM) was an important source of carbon for DHABs, due to their depth, the concentration of POM reaching the pools is not significant as originally thought. The majority of fixed carbon is now thought to come from autotrophy, specifically methanogenesis. Direct measurements of methane production in DHABs have provided extensive molecular evidence of methanogenesis in these environments. Proteomic analyses further support the presence of methanogenesis by identifying the enzyme RuBisCo in various DHABs. Interestingly, it has been suggested that, instead of CO_{2} or acetoclastic methanogenesis, prokaryotes in DHABs use methylotrophic methanogenesis, as it allows for a higher energy yield and the intermediates can be used for osmoprotectants.

==== Nitrogen cycling ====
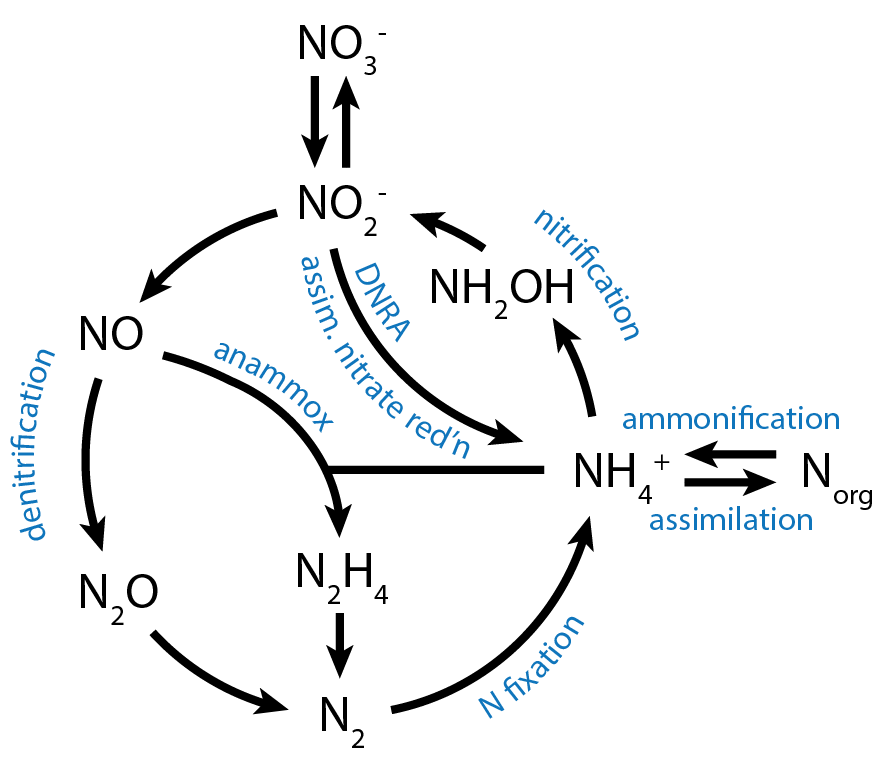
A simplified version of the nitrogen cycle showing the metabolisms responsible for reduction/oxidation of each N species

One of the key metabolic features of DHABs is the dissimilatory reduction of nitrogen. This is predominantly due to the thermodynamic favorability of nitrogen-based metabolisms in anaerobic environments. In Bannock basin and L'Atalante basin, anammox and denitrification pathways have been identified using a combination of transcriptomics and direct isotope tracking. Other DHABs have been analyzed for anammox pathways using metatranscriptomic techniques with little positive results, which may be due to the limitations of transcriptomic sensitivity. In deeper DHAB layers, nitrogen fixation and ammonium assimilation has been observed. These reductive pathways require a lot of energy and are mainly performed by methanogens to synthesize osmoprotectants.

==== Sulfur cycling ====
Due to the high concentration of sulfate (especially in the Uranian Basin), sulfate reduction is extremely important in the biogeochemical cycling of DHABs. The highest rates of sulfate reduction tend to be found in the deepest DHAB layers, where redox potential is lowest. Sulfate reducing bacteria have been found in the brines of Kebrit Deep, Nereus Deep, Erba Deep, Atlantis II Deep, and Discovery Deep. Oxidative sulfur pathways help close the biogeochemical sulfur loops within the DHABs. There are three main sulfur oxidizing pathways which are likely found in DHABs:

1. sulfur-oxidizing multienzyme complex which can oxidize sulfide or thiosulfate to sulfate (with elemental sulfur or sulfite as an intermediate).
2. a sulfide/quinone complex which oxidizes hydrogen sulfide to elemental sulfur.
3. polysulfide reductase, which reduces precipitate sulfur to sulfide.

A combination between the second and third pathway would allow for increased energetic yield. In addition, some novel groups have been isolated from saline lakes which can anaerobically respire sulfur using acetate, pyruvate, formate, or hydrogen as a sole electron donors.

=== Microbial symbiosis ===
There is a high concentration of bacteria present in brine pools that serve essential roles for the ecosystem, such as being part of symbiotic relationships or acting as a food source for several organisms in this habitat. Examples include tubeworms and clams having a symbiotic relationship with many of these bacteria to convert chemical energy from hydrogen sulfide, and in exchange providing them food to allow reproduction and development; or mussels providing a safe habitat for bacteria that feed on methane while thriving due to the chemosynthetic, carbon-fixing symbionts that are inhabiting their gill tissues. Thus, these symbiotic relationships with bacteria allow organisms to be abundant and have high biomass in these harsher environments.

Bacteria can also act as epibiotic symbiont, which were found to play an important role in the adaptations of microorganisms to these environments, such as organisms from the flagellated group Euglenozoa that have been thriving in brine pools due to this relationship.

== Examples ==
- Afifi
- Atlantis II
- Conrad
- Discovery
- Kebrit
- Kryos
- L'Atalante basin
- Orca Basin
- Shaban

== Future uses ==
One major idea involves harnessing the salinity of brine pools to use as a power source. This would be done using an osmotic engine which draws the high-salinity top water through the engine and pushes it down due to osmotic pressure. This would cause the brackish stream (which is less dense and has a lighter salinity) to be propelled away from the engine via buoyancy. The energy created by this exchange can be harnessed using a turbine to create a power output.

It is possible to study liquid brine in order to harness its electrical conductivity to study if liquid water is present on Mars. A HABIT (Habitability: Brines, Irradiation, and Temperature) instrument will be part of a 2020 campaign to monitor changing conditions on Mars. This device will include a BOTTLE (Brine Observation Transition to Liquid Experiment) experiment to quantify the formation of transient liquid brine as well as observe its stability over time under non-equilibrium conditions.

A third idea involves using microorganisms in deep-sea brine pools to form natural-product drugs. These microorganisms are important sources of bioactive molecules against various diseases due to the extreme environment they inhabit, giving potential to an increasing number of drugs in clinical trials. In particular, a novel finding in a study used microorganisms from the Red Sea brine pools as potential anticancer drugs.

Deep sea brine pools have also been a large interest in bioprospecting in the hope that unlikely environments might serve as sources of biomedical breakthroughs due to unexplored biodiversity. Some areas have been found to host antibacterial and anticancer activities in biosynthetic clusters. Other novel antibiotic resistance enzymes have been found that are useful in various biomedical and industrial applications.

== See also ==
- Halocline
- Undersea river
