= Louann Salt =

Evaporite formation in the Gulf of Mexico

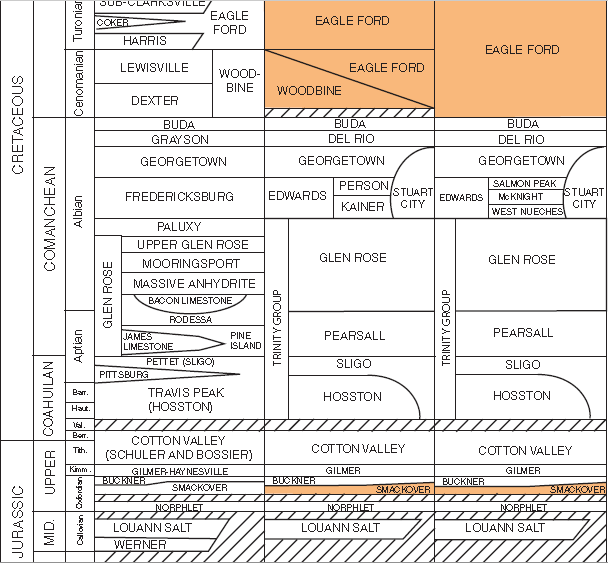
Louann Salt stratigraphic column for Texas

The Louann Salt is a widespread evaporite formation that formed in the Gulf of Mexico during the Callovian in the mid Jurassic. The Louann formed in a rift as the South American and North American Plates separated, from an embayment of the Pacific Ocean. The Louann underlies much of the northern Gulf Coast from Texas to the Florida panhandle and extends beneath large areas of the Gulf Coastal Plain of Mississippi, Louisiana and Texas.

The Campeche Salt or Isthmian Salt is the contemporaneous salt layer that developed on the south margin of the rift. It extends from Campeche, Mexico, north along the west margin of the Campeche Bank north of the Yucatan Peninsula. The Orca Basin is a distinctive brine pool on the Louisiana continental shelf. One of the many salt domes derived from the Louann was the site of the Spindletop oil strike near Beaumont, Texas, in 1901.
