= Messinian erosional crisis =

The Messinian Erosional Crisis is a phase in the Messinian evolution of the central Mediterranean basin resulting from major drawdown of the Mediterranean seawater (the "Messinian Salinity Crisis").

As outlined in numerous studies, erosional events along the margins of the Mediterranean Basin during the Messinian timespan, before and during the evaporite deposition, were common. Those authors showed that also predating the deposition of the first cycle of evaporites, a major erosional phase can be observed along the basin margins, corresponding to a major "relative sea level drop", associated with tectonic activity (marking the end of the so-called "Mes-1" unconformity bound depositional sequence). Following this assumption that this major event corresponds to the major Messinian drawdown, Bache et al. (2009) concluded that the Mediterranean bathymetry significantly decreased before the precipitation of central basin evaporites. Van Dijk et al. (1998) had termed this end member scenario the "Hunchback Scenario". Regarding these works, a deep water formation for central Messinian evaporites seems unlikely. The assumption that central basin evaporites partly deposited under a high bathymetry and before the major phase of erosion should imply the observation of a major detritic event above evaporites in the basin. Such a depositional geometry has not been observed on data, as the detritic wedges are merely confined to the basin marginal areas.

Another major point of discussion regards the presence of erosional deep canyons along the continental margins of the Basins. These should be expected to be present because of the assumption of a major sea level drop. In fact, they have been described by several authors (summarized in e.g. Clauzon et al., 1996). Most of them are infilled by early Pliocene sediments. As outlined in van Dijk et al. (1998) this phenomenon can be explained in two ways: A major eustatic sea level drop, or a tectonic uplift of the margins (as one associated with a minor sea level drop). It constitutes, therefore, not a real proof for the desiccation of an existing originally deep basin.

The third much-disputed element is the recognition of the so-called "MES", the Messinian Erosional Surface. This surface can well be traced in seismic sections along the Basin margins, showing angular and non-angular unconformities, somewhere within the evaporite deposits, or between evaporite and non-evaporite deposits. Nice examples are shown by Roveri et al. (2008). As already extensively discussed in van Dijk (1992), the erosional surfaces within the Messinian clastic and evaporitic and mixed series are often confused. Only very high resolution and complete series such as those in the Crotone Basin in Calabria can solve this matter, and the authors have shown that the erosional surfaces and there probable relationships with relative sea level fluctuations and tectonic activity can be mapped well (see review in van Dijk et al., 1998).
