= L'Atalante basin =

Anoxic hypersaline brine basin at the bottom of the Mediterranean Sea

- Location within Mediterranean
- Coordinates: 35.18°N 21.41°E

L'Atalante basin is a hypersaline brine lake at the bottom of the Mediterranean Sea about 192 km (119 mi) west of the island of Crete. It is named for the French L'Atalante, one of the oceanographic research vessels involved in its discovery in 1993. L'Atalante and its neighbors the Urania and Discovery deep hyper saline anoxic basins (DHABs) are at most 35,000 years old. They were formed by Messinian evaporite salt deposits dissolving out of the Mediterranean Ridge and collecting in abyssal depressions about 3,000 m (9,800 ft) deep. L'Atalante is the smallest of the three; its surface begins at about 3,500 m (11,500 ft) below sea level.

== Description and biology ==
The L'Atalante basin's salinity is near saturation at 365 g/L (about 8 times that of ordinary seawater), which prevents it from mixing with the oxygenated waters above; therefore, it is completely anoxic. The approximately 1.5 m (5 ft) halocline between the seawater above and brine below teems with bacterial and archaeal cells: they are chemoautotrophs, which feed on ammonia from the brine but cannot function without some oxygen. Members of archaeal anaerobic methane oxidizers group 1 (ANME-1) and haloarchaea are found only in the halocline zone. No group of organisms manages to prosper in all three zones. In the brine, there are fewer cells; extremophiles predominate, including members of the deep-sea hydrothermal vent euryarchaeota (DHVEs), Methanohalophilus and Pseudomonadota (formerly Proteobacteria). Eukaryotes are also found in l'Atalante, including ciliates (45%), dinoflagellates (21%) and choanoflagellates (10%).

The dark gray anoxic sediments at the bottom of L'Atalante lake are covered with a 1 cm (0.4 in) loose black layer. Microbes found in the sediments are almost all (90%) various species of Bacillus. In 2010, three metazoan species, all in the Loricifera phylum, were discovered living in the sediment, the first multicellular lifeforms known to live entirely without oxygen.
