= Orca Basin =

Mid-slope, silled, mini-basin in the northern Gulf of Mexico

Coordinates: 26°56′46″N 91°20′44″W

The Orca Basin is a mid-slope, silled, mini-basin in the northern Gulf of Mexico some 300 km southwest of the Mississippi River mouth on the Louisiana continental slope. It is unique amongst the mini-basins in this area, in that it contains a large brine pool of anoxic salt brine. The pool is approximately 123 km^{2} (47 sq mi) in area and up to 220 m (720 ft) deep under 2,400 m (7,900 ft) of Gulf water and is derived from dissolution of underlying Jurassic age Louann Salt. With a volume of 13.3 km^{3} (3.2 cu mi), the pool results from the dissolution of about 3.62 billion tonnes of the Louann Salt bed into seawater. The basin owes its shape to ongoing salt tectonics and is surrounded by salt diapirs.

Gas hydrates were detected in a number of cores collected in the Orca basin during Leg 96 of the Deep Sea Drilling Program (DSDP). The cores were recovered from a water depth of 2,412 m (7,913 ft) at Holes 618 and 618A, with first evidence of gas hydrate occurring in Hole 618. Hydrates were observed in the top section of Core 618-4 at 85 fbsf (26 mbsf) in gray mud and consisted of a few white crystals of a few millimeters in diameter. At Hole 618A, gas hydrates were observed in both Cores 618A-2 and 618-3 in the 62-121 fbsf (19-37 mbsf) range, with hydrates distributed throughout Core 618A-3. The hydrates ranged in size from a few millimeters to possibly a centimeter in diameter and were white.

Based on light δ13C values, the origin of the hydrate gas is biogenic. Researchers also noted that some of the hydrates appeared to occur in the sandy layers of the cores. In contrast to other gas hydrate occurrences in the Gulf of Mexico, the gas hydrate was found within a mini-basin instead of on the fractured and faulted rim of the mini-basin. It was also noted that the depth of gas hydrate occurrence coincides with the presence of black organic and/or pyrite-rich mud.

== Importance of Orca Basin as a study site ==
The Orca Basin is important in understanding glacial and deglacial changes, including the history of meltwater flows from the Laurentide Ice Sheet, that have affected North America and the Gulf of Mexico. The sediments that fill the Orca Basin contain an important record of the paleoenvironment and paleo-oceanology of the Louisiana continental slope south of the Mississippi River Delta for at least the last 25,000 years. Because of location of this basin, paleoenvironmental proxies, e.g. planktonic foraminifers, stable isotope ratios, changes in sediment texture, and reworked calcareous nanofossils, preserved in its sediment also recorded the impact and chronology of meltwater floods that flowed down the Mississippi River on the Gulf of Mexico during the last deglaciation.

In addition, the only recorded recovery of gas hydrates in the Gulf of Mexico from depths greater than 66 fbsf (20 mbsf) occurred at DSDP Site 618 in the Orca Basin. The recovery of biogenic methane hydrate from Orca basin is also significant due to the high salinity values, which at the sediment/water interface were nearly five times as high as those found in the Red Sea (with salinity values of 240-260 PSU). The values decreased rapidly with depth to about 98 fbsf (30 mbsf) before becoming constant (48-56 PSU). The hydrate recovered from both sites in Orca Basin were in the range of 85-121 fbsf (26-37 mbsf) and are physical evidence of the decreased salinity levels.

The Orca Basin provides an ideal setting for studying the fate of organic matter, nutrients, and metals. Examining the consumption or production of dissolved materials provides insight to how said materials mix with the seawater. At depths of 2,220 metres (7,280 ft) to 2,245 metres (7,365 ft), the distribution of ammonium reflects conservative mixing of the ammonium with seawater. At a depth of 2,200 metres (7,200 ft), denitrification is heavily limited due to the absence of nitrate. With the absence of nitrate, manganese and iron oxides are more present, which also leads to iron-reducing and manganese-reducing bacteria being more present. The changing presence of materials at different depths signifies what heterotrophic populations are present. Below depths of 2,225 metres (7,300 ft), detectable dissolved sulfide increases and indicates that bacterial sulfate reduction is the primary method for organic matter degradation.
