= Messinian evaporite =

Geologic formation in Sicily, Italy

The Messinian evaporite deposit is a geological deposit of evaporites which was found on Sicily and named after the city of Messina. It was later found to underlie much of the bed of the Mediterranean Sea, including the L'Atalante basin. It was formed during the Messinian salinity crisis.
