= Polysulfide reductase =

Protein

NrfD

Identifiers
- Symbol: NrfD
- Pfam: PF03916
- Pfam clan: CL0308
- InterPro: IPR005614
- OPM superfamily: 3
- OPM protein: 2vpz
Available protein structures:
- PDB: IPR005614 PF03916 (ECOD; PDBsum)
- AlphaFold: IPR005614; PF03916

Polysulfide reductase (NrfD) is an integral transmembrane protein with loops in both the periplasm and the cytoplasm. NrfD is thought to participate in the transfer of electrons, from the quinone pool into the terminal components of the Nrf pathway.
