= Extremozyme =

An extremozyme is an enzyme, often created by archaea, which are known prokaryotic extremophiles that can function under extreme environments. Examples of such are those in highly acidic/basic conditions, high/low temperatures, high salinity, or other factors, that would otherwise denature typical enzymes (e.g. catalase, rubisco, carbonic anhydrase). This feature makes these enzymes of interest in a variety of biotechnical applications in the energy, pharmaceutical, agricultural, environmental, food, health, and textile industries.

== History ==
Since the 1960s, scientists have known that most enzymes have a range of functionality under different conditions. Due to their unique properties that allow catalytic reactions to occur in a more efficient nature, enzymes were sought after for use in harsh industrial chemical processes in the interest of profits and environmental protection. As time passed and demand called for higher product output, the harshness of the chemical processes continued to increase in order to keep up with demand, which led to the need for enzymes that could perform in conditions where their predecessors could not.

In the 1980s, scientists found enzymes that could withstand abnormal conditions. Karl Stetter and his colleagues from the University of Regensburg, Germany, discovered organisms that grew optimally at the boiling point of water (100 °C (212 °F)) or greater in geothermal sediments and the heated waters of the Italian Volcano Island. After this groundbreaking discovery, he went on to discover more than 20 genera of microbes that grew in nearly the same conditions, two of which are Thermotoga and Aquifex bacteria, while the others were archaea. These discoveries intrigued the rest of the scientific world. In the next few decades, Japan, Russia, France, and other countries searched for microbes with the same kind of extreme novel characteristics as Stetter's.

== See also ==
- Berkeley Pit
- Polypeptide
- Protein
- Allostery
