= Atlantis II Deep =

Deep sea basin in the Red Sea

The Atlantis II Deep is a deep sea submarine basin located in the Red Sea, notable for containing hot brines. It has been observed to experience a gradual temperature increase over the past 50 years, 56°C to 68°C, influencing the microbial communities and biochemical processes within its brine waters. This has been studied to understand the shifts in microbial communities, their metabolic pathways, and the consumption of hydrothermally generated aromatic compounds.

Atlantis II Deep holds the largest known hydrothermal ore deposit on the seabed. It contains amounts of copper, cobalt, and zinc that exceed normal seawater traces by around 1000 times. The upper 33 feet of the basin holds a relatively small but rich deposit of valuable metals.
