= Sorbas Basin =

Geologic formation in Spain

Coordinates: 37°07′N 2°13′W

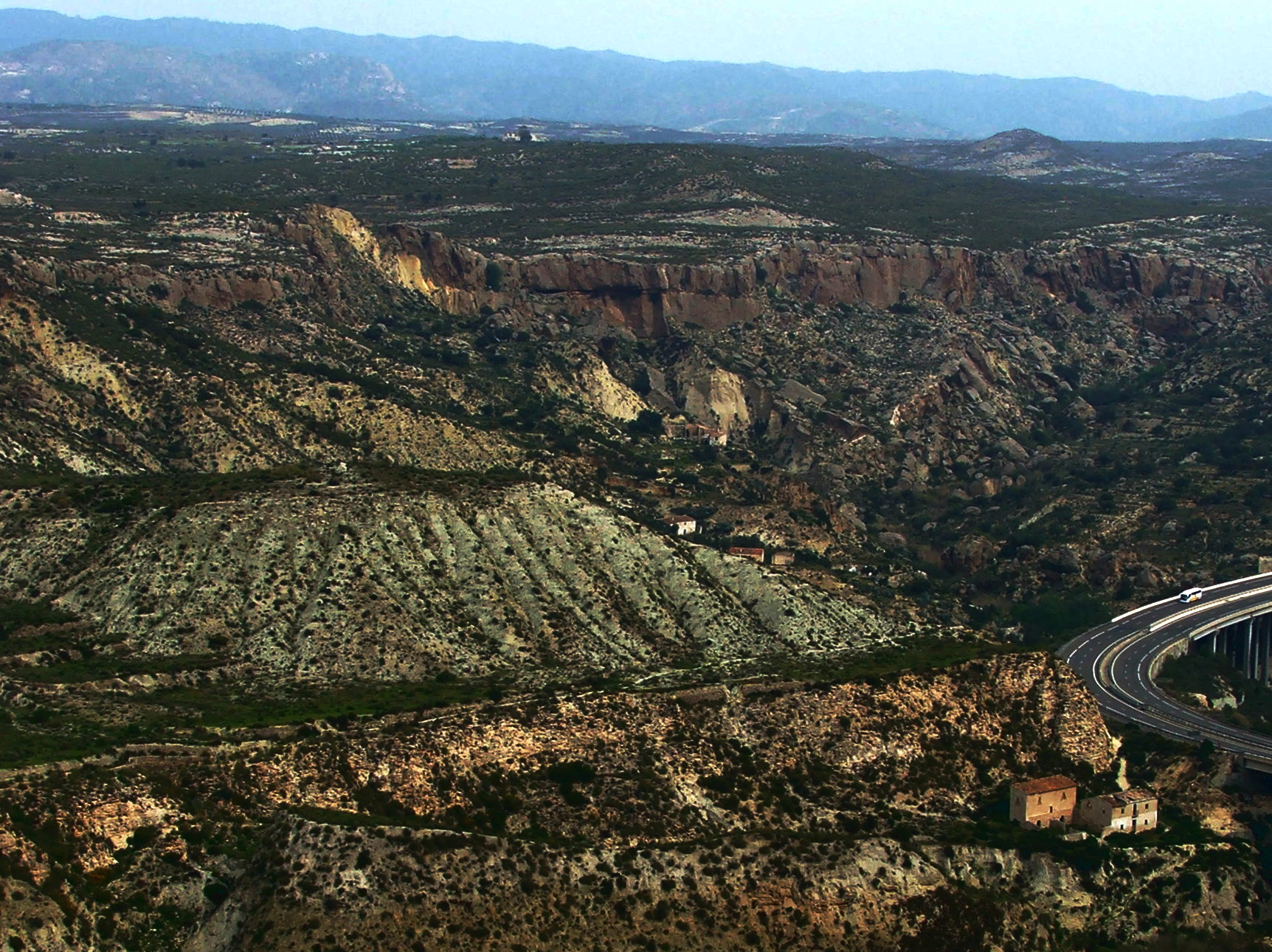
A section through the Sorbas basin. See text for explanation.

The Sorbas Basin is a sedimentary basin around the town of Sorbas in Almeria Province in south-east Spain. It is believed to have been formed by extension, between two fault-bounded blocks which rotated anti-clockwise to take up the compression resulting from Europe's collision with Africa. The basin is filled with turbidites and evaporites of the Tortonian-Messinian ages of the Miocene Epoch.

It is a matter of some debate whether the basin dried out at the same time as the main Mediterranean basins.

== Basin fill ==
The basin is divided into the following members:

- At the bottom of the image, the house is constructed on the steep yellow cliffs of the resistant Azagador Member.
- The lower (whiter) and upper (yellower) Abad Marls, a Tortonian/Messinian series of turbidites featuring pronounced Milankovic (20,000 year precession) cyclicity, allowing chronostratigraphic dating; these fine muds are easily eroded.
- When the sea returned overdeepening the basin, salt water waterfalls eroded a 200 m depression patterned by 30 m deep gullies.
- the Messinian Yesares Member, a gypsum evaporite, forms the steep bluffs at the top of the valley; there is some debate about how conformable its contact with the Abad marls is.
- Pliocene deposits, rest unconformably on the top.
- Complexity of drawdown and reflooding complicate correlation of the ‘Salinity Crisis' stratigraphy.

== Basin significance ==
A possible palaeogeographical reconstruction of the Miocene Mediterranean. North to the left. *Red = current coastline *S = Sorbas basin, Spain *R = Rifean corridor *B = Betic corridor *G = Strait of Gibraltar *M = Mediterranean sea

The basin was separated from the main Mediterranean basin during the Messinian salinity crisis; therefore the timing of the Yesares Member relative to the main basin evaporites is crucial to distinguish between models of how the Mediterranean dried out.
