= Messinian =

Sixth and last age of the Miocene Epoch, about 7 to 5 million years ago

- 7.246 – 5.333 Ma

Chronology
← / Messinian salinity crisis; ← / North American prairie expands
Subdivision of the Neogene according to the ICS, as of 2024. Vertical axis scale: Millions of years ago
- Formerly part of: Tertiary Period/System

Etymology
- Name formality: Formal

Usage information
- Celestial body: Earth
- Regional usage: Global (ICS)
- Time scale(s) used: ICS Time Scale

Definition
- Chronological unit: Age
- Stratigraphic unit: Stage
- Time span formality: Formal
- Lower boundary definition: First regular occurrence of the Planktonic Foraminifer Globorotalia miotumida; FAD of the Haptophyte Amaurolithus delicatus
- Lower boundary GSSP: Oued Akrech section, Rabat, Morocco; 33.9369°N 6.8125°W
- Lower GSSP ratified: January 2000
- Upper boundary definition: Base of the Thvera magnetic event (C3n.4n), which is only 96 ka (5 precession cycles) younger than the GSSP
- Upper boundary GSSP: Heraclea Minoa section, Heraclea Minoa, Cattolica Eraclea, Sicily, Italy; 37.3917°N 13.2806°E
- Upper GSSP ratified: 2000

The Messinian is in the geologic timescale the last age or uppermost stage of the Miocene. It spans the time between 7.246 ± 0.005 Ma and 5.333 ± 0.005 Ma (million years ago). It follows the Tortonian and is followed by the Zanclean, the first age of the Pliocene.

The Messinian overlaps the Turolian European Land Mammal Mega Zone (more precisely MN 12 and 13) and the Pontian Central European Paratethys Stage. It also overlaps the late Huayquerian and early Montehermosan South American Land Mammal Ages, and falls inside the more extensive Hemphillian North American Land Mammal Age.

During the Messinian, around 6 million years ago, the Messinian salinity crisis took place, which brought about repeated desiccations of the Mediterranean Sea.

== Definition ==
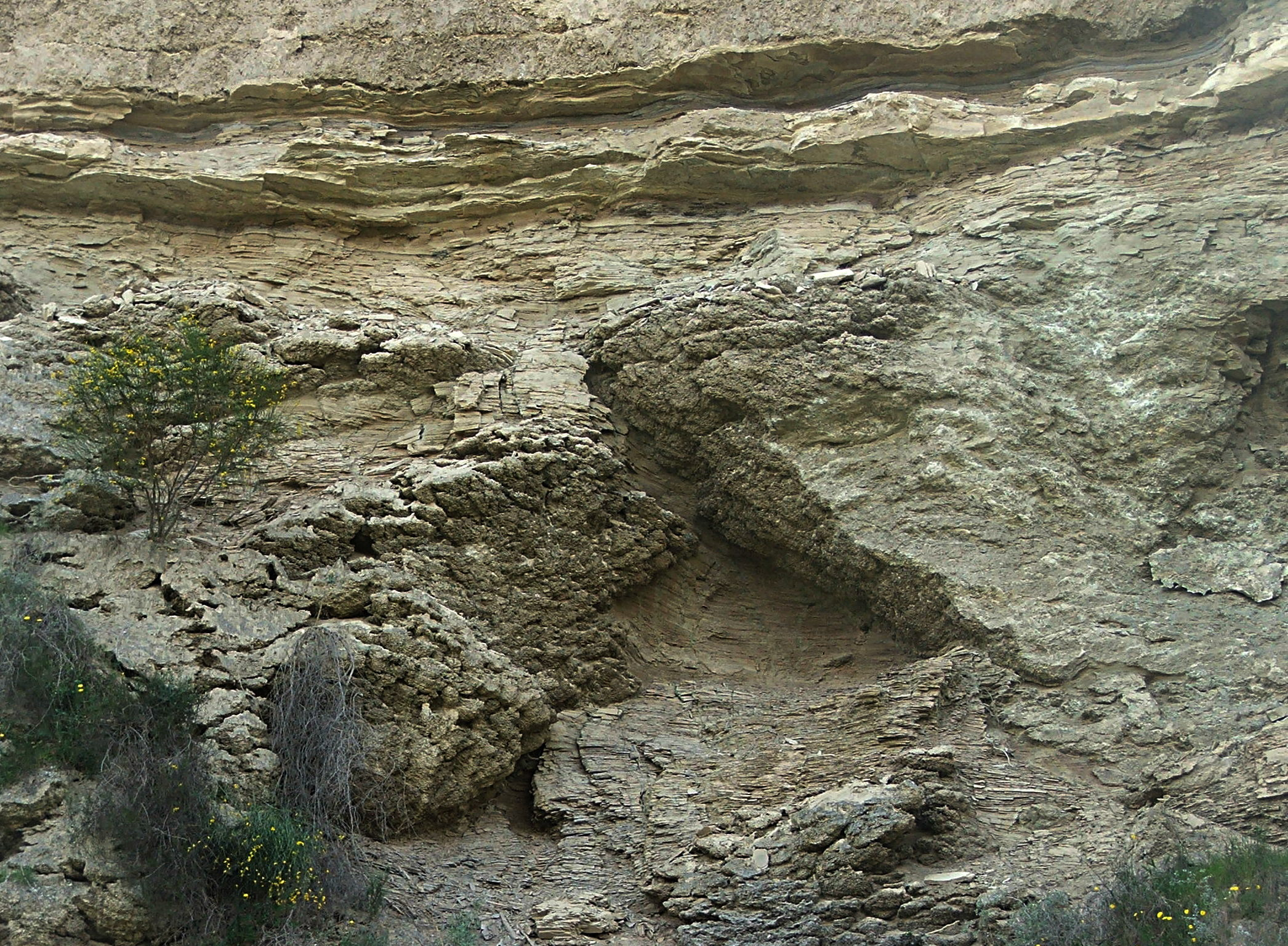
Messinian gypsum and clay deposits in the Sorbas basin near Sorbas, southern Spain. Evaporite deposits of Messinian age are common throughout the Mediterranean.

The Messinian was introduced by Swiss stratigrapher Karl Mayer-Eymar in 1867. Its name comes from the Italian city of Messina on Sicily, where the Messinian evaporite deposit is of the same age.

The base of the Messinian is at the first appearance of the planktonic foram species Globorotalia conomiozea and is stratigraphically in the middle of magnetic chronozone C3Br.1r. The Global Boundary Stratotype Section and Point for the Messinian is located in a section at Oued Akrech, near the Moroccan capital Rabat.

The top of the Messinian (the base of the Zanclean Stage and Pliocene Series) lies with the top of magnetic chronozone Cr3 (about 100,000 years before the Thvera normal subchronozone C3n.4n). The top is also close to the extinction level of the calcareous nanoplankton species Triquetrorhabdulus rugosus (the base of biozone CN10b) and the first appearance of nanoplankton Ceratolithus acutus.

== Palaeoclimatology ==
In South Asia, the first part of the Messinian up to about 6.0 Ma is associated with major drying that transformed the region from being mainly dominated by C_{3} forest and woodland to a C_{4} savanna.

The Messinian in Namibia is associated with a climatic transition from the relatively wet Tortonian climate to the arid one of the Zanclean.
