= List of the prehistoric life of Oregon =

This list of the prehistoric life of Oregon contains the various prehistoric life-forms whose fossilized remains have been reported from within the US state of Oregon.

== Precambrian ==
The Paleobiology Database records no known occurrences of Precambrian fossils in Oregon.

== Paleozoic ==
- †Acteonina
  - †Acteonina permiana – type locality for species
- †Albaillella
  - †Albaillella asymmetrica
  - †Albaillella sinuata
  - †Albaillella triangularis – or unidentified comparable form
- †Alexenia – tentative report
  - †Alexenia occidentalis – type locality for species
  - †Alexenia subquadrata – type locality for species
- †Anidanthus
  - †Anidanthus minor – type locality for species
- †Antiquatonia
  - †Antiquatonia cooperi – type locality for species
  - †Antiquatonia reticulata – type locality for species
- †Arceodomus
  - †Arceodomus sphairikos – type locality for species
- †Arcochiton
  - †Arcochiton soccus – type locality for species
- †Bajkuria
  - †Bajkuria rostrata
- †Bathymyonia
  - †Bathymyonia elongata – type locality for species
- †Calliprotonia
  - †Calliprotonia inexpectatum – type locality for species
- †Changmeia
  - †Changmeia bigflatensis – type locality for species
  - †Changmeia bostwicki – type locality for species
- †Chauliochiton
- †Chonetes
  - †Chonetes alatus – or unidentified related form
  - †Chonetes pygmoideus – type locality for species
- †Chonetinella
- †Cleiothyridina
  - †Cleiothyridina attenuata – type locality for species
- †Composita
- †Corwenia – tentative report
  - †Corwenia ashwillensis – type locality for species
- †Crurithyris
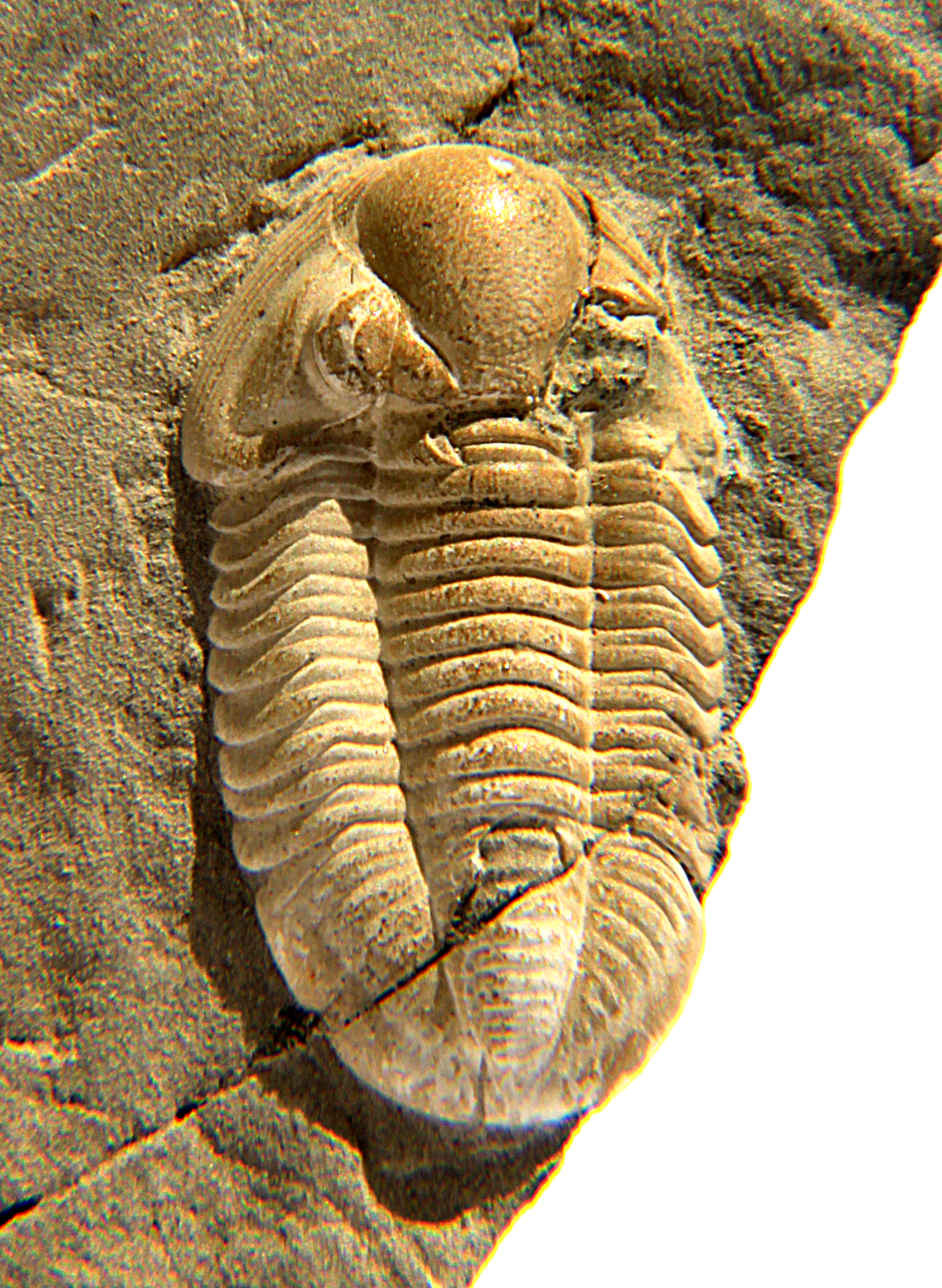
- Fossil of the Carboniferous-Permian trilobit Cummingella
  †Cummingella
- †Cystolonsdaleia
  - †Cystolonsdaleia berthiaumi – type locality for species
- †Deflandrella
  - †Deflandrella manica
- †Derbyia
- †Diadeloplax
  - †Diadeloplax apiculatus – type locality for species
- †Dielasma
  - †Dielasma brevicostatum – type locality for species
  - †Dielasma rectimarginatum – type locality for species
  - †Dielasma truncatum – type locality for species
- †Entactinia
  - †Entactinia modesta
- †Entactinosphaera
  - †Entactinosphaera cimelia – or unidentified related form
- †Eoparafusulina
- †Follicucullus
  - †Follicucullus charveti
  - †Follicucullus monacanthus
  - †Follicucullus scholasticus
  - †Follicucullus ventricosus
- †Gryphochiton
  - †Gryphochiton planoplata
- †Haplentactinia – tentative report
  - †Haplentactinia ichikawai
- †Hegleria
  - †Hegleria mammilla
- †Heritschioides – tentative report
- †Himathyris
  - †Himathyris gerardi
- †Homeochiton – type locality for genus
  - †Homeochiton triangularis – type locality for species
- †Hustedia
- †Ishigaum
  - †Ishigaum trifustis
- †Kashiwara
  - †Kashiwara magna
- †Kleopatrina
  - †Kleopatrina magnifica – or unidentified comparable form
- †Kochiproductus
  - †Kochiproductus porrectus – or unidentified comparable form
  - †Kochiproductus transversus – type locality for species
- †Krotovia
  - †Krotovia barenzi – or unidentified related form
  - †Krotovia oregonensis – type locality for species
  - †Krotovia parva – type locality for species
  - †Krotovia pustulata
- †Kuvelousia
  - †Kuvelousia leptosa – type locality for species
- †Latentibifistula
  - †Latentibifistula asperspongiosa – or unidentified related form
- †Latentifistula
  - †Latentifistula crux – or unidentified related form
  - †Latentifistula patagilaterala
  - †Latentifistula texana
- †Leptodus – tentative report
- †Linoproductus
  - †Linoproductus lutkewitschi – or unidentified comparable form
- †Marginifera – tentative report
  - †Marginifera brevisulcata – type locality for species
  - †Marginifera costellata – type locality for species
  - †Marginifera multicostellata – type locality for species
  - †Marginifera profundosulcata – type locality for species
- †Martinia
  - †Martinia berthiaumei – type locality for species
- †Meekella
- †Monodiexodina – tentative report
- †Nazarovella
  - †Nazarovella gracilis
- †Neoalbaillella
  - †Neoalbaillella pseudogrypus
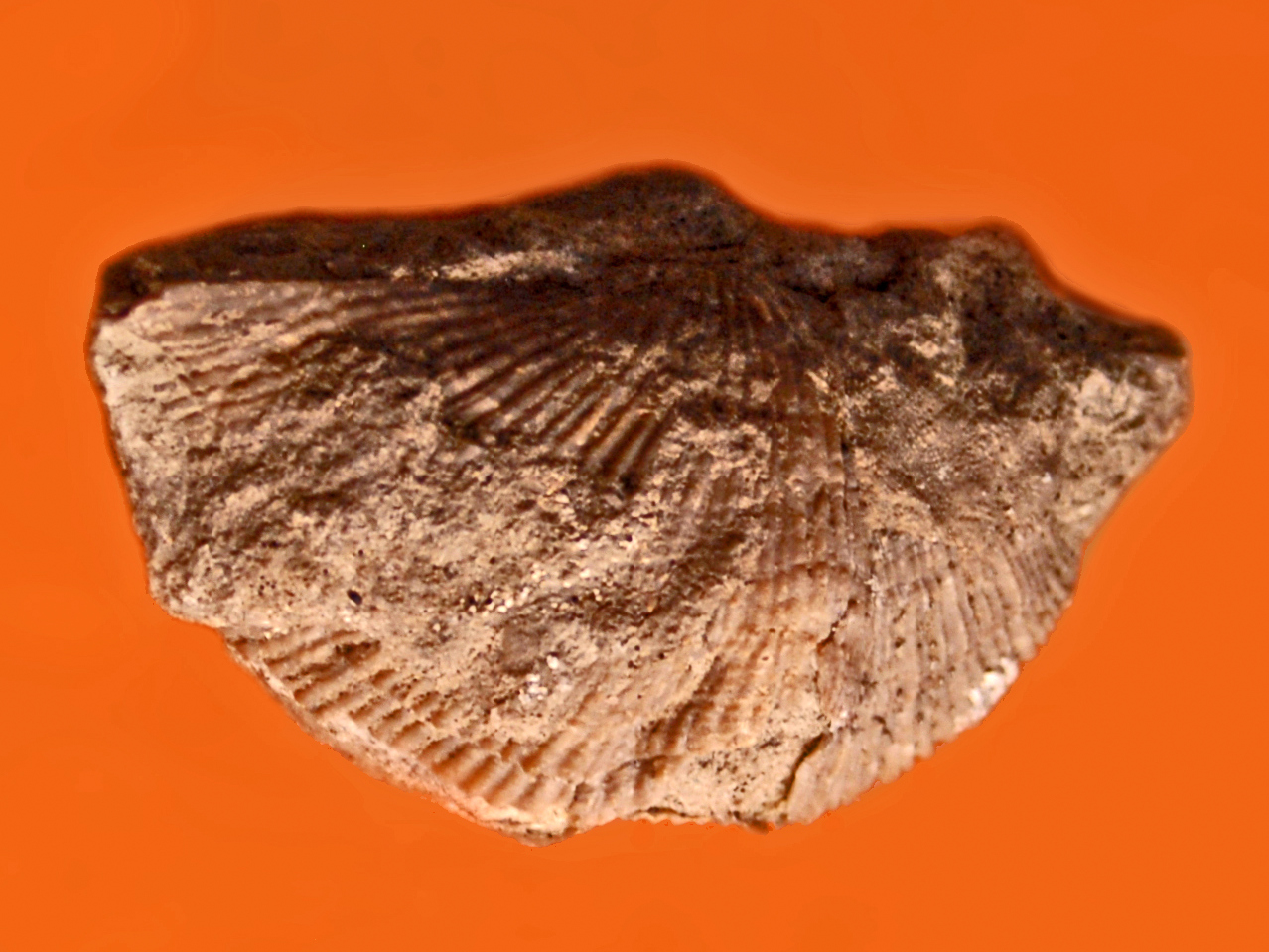
- Fossilized shell of the Carboniferous-Permian brachiopod Neospirifer
  †Neospirifer
- †Petalaxis
  - †Petalaxis occidentalis – type locality for species
- †Polydiexodina
  - †Polydiexodina oregonensis
- †Praedeflandrella
- †Probolionia
  - †Probolionia elongata – type locality for species
  - †Probolionia posteroreticulata – type locality for species
- †Proboscidella – tentative report
  - †Proboscidella carinata – type locality for species
- †Protowentzelella
- †Pseudoalbaillella
  - †Pseudoalbaillella fusiformis
  - †Pseudoalbaillella globosa – or unidentified related form
  - †Pseudoalbaillella lomentaria – or unidentified comparable form
  - †Pseudoalbaillella longicornis – or unidentified related form
  - †Pseudoalbaillella scalprata
- †Pseudotormentus
  - †Pseudotormentus kamigoriensis
- †Pterochiton
- †Punctospirifer
- †Quinqueremis
  - †Quinqueremis robusta – or unidentified related form
- †Rhipidomella
- †Rhynchopora
  - †Rhynchopora magna – type locality for species
- †Rostranteris
  - †Rostranteris merriami – type locality for species
  - †Rostranteris sulcatum – type locality for species
- †Schwagerina
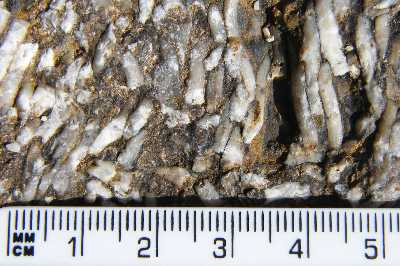
- Fossil of the Carboniferous colonial rugose coral Siphonodendron
  †Siphonodendron – tentative report
- †Spiriferella
  - †Spiriferella pseudodraschei – type locality for species
- †Spiriferellina
  - †Spiriferellina pauciplicata – type locality for species
- †Stenoscisma
  - †Stenoscisma americanum – type locality for species
  - †Stenoscisma biplicatoideum – type locality for species
  - †Stenoscisma mutabile
  - †Stenoscisma mutabilis
  - †Stenoscisma plicatum – or unidentified comparable form
- †Stigmosphaerostylus
  - †Stigmosphaerostylus itsukaichiensis
- †Tiramnia
  - †Tiramnia semiglobosa – or unidentified related form
- †Triplanospongos
  - †Triplanospongos dekkasensis
- †Waagenoconcha
  - †Waagenoconcha parvispinosa – type locality for species
- †Wellerella
  - †Wellerella multiplicata – type locality for species
- †Wilsonastraea
  - †Wilsonastraea ochocoensis – type locality for species
- †Yakovlevia
  - †Yakovlevia brevisulcata
  - †Yakovlevia transversa – type locality for species
- †Yokoyamaella – tentative report
  - †Yokoyamaella oregonensis – type locality for species

== Mesozoic ==
=== Selected Mesozoic taxa of Oregon ===
- †Acanthodiscus
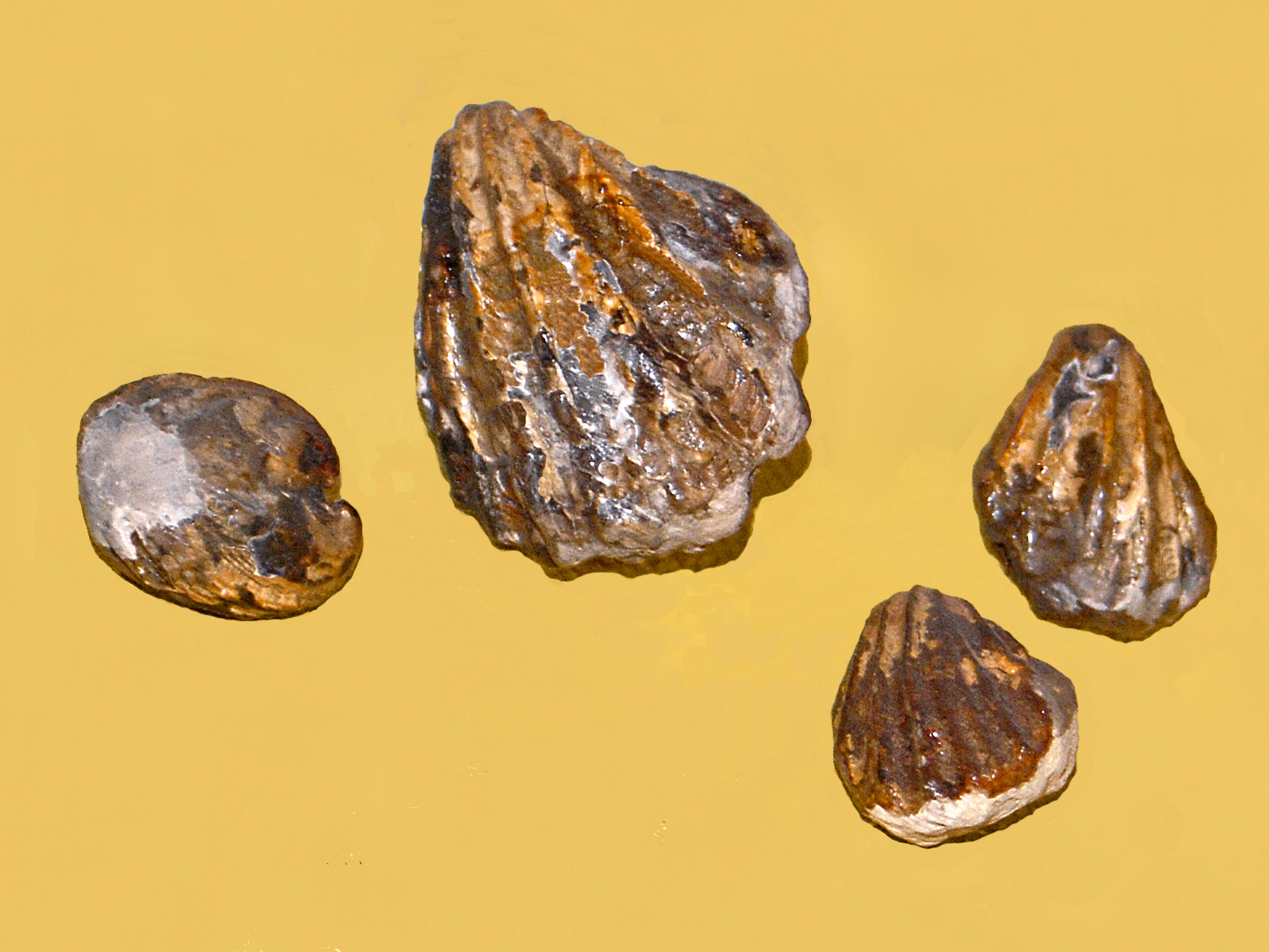
- Fossilized shells of the Early-Late Cretaceous marine bivalve Actinoceramus
  †Actinoceramus
- †Anahamulina
- †Anatropites
- †Arcestes
- †Arietoceltites
- Astarte
- †Bennettazhia
  - †Bennettazhia oregonensis – type locality for species
- Cadulus
- †Calycoceras
- Cardinia
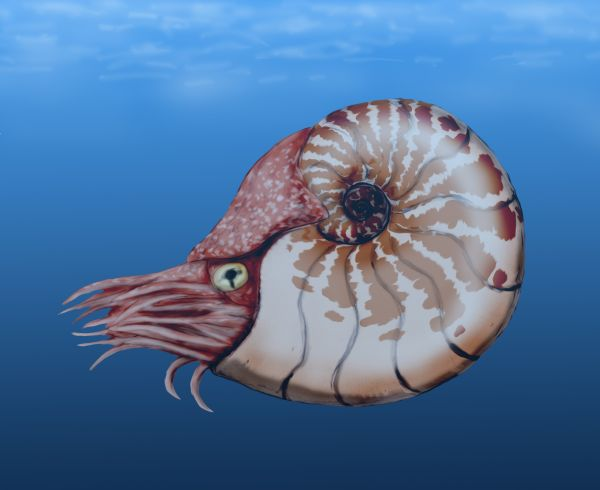
- Life restoration of the Late Triassic-Middle Jurassic nautiloid cephalopod Cenoceras
  †Cenoceras
- Chlamys
- †Cleoniceras – tentative report
- †Corum
- †Crioceratites
- Dentalium
- †Gervillia
- †Gryphaea
  - †Gryphaea arcuataeformis
- †Hoploparia
- †Hypophylloceras
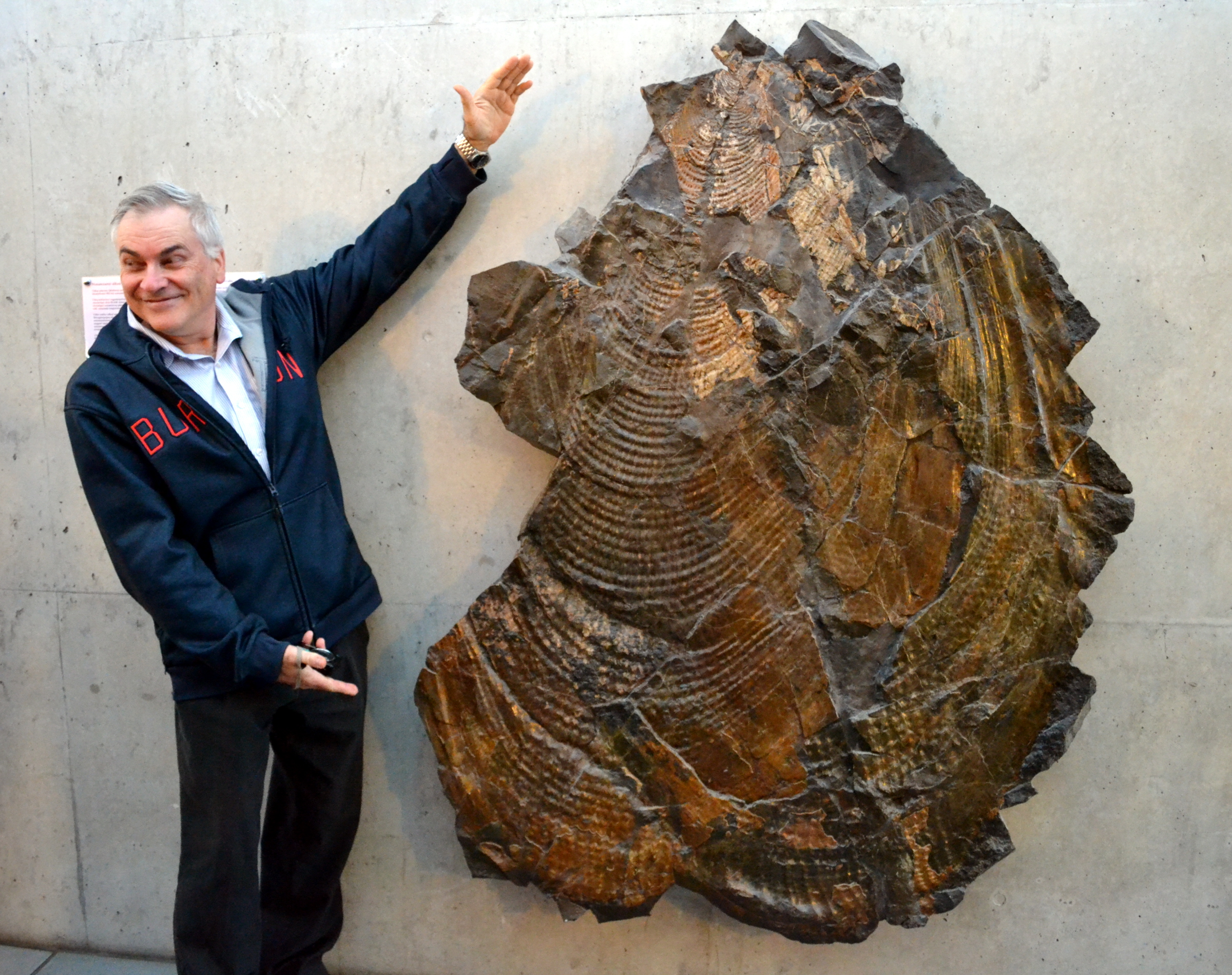
- Fossilized shell of the Early Jurassic-Late Cretaceous marine bivalve Inoceramus with a human indicating its size
  †Inoceramus
- †Kilianella
- †Lantus
- Lima
- †Lissodus
- † Loffa
- Lopha
- †Lucina
- †Lyelliceras
- †Lytoceras
- †Mantelliceras
- †Metapolygnathus
- Milax
- †Modiolus
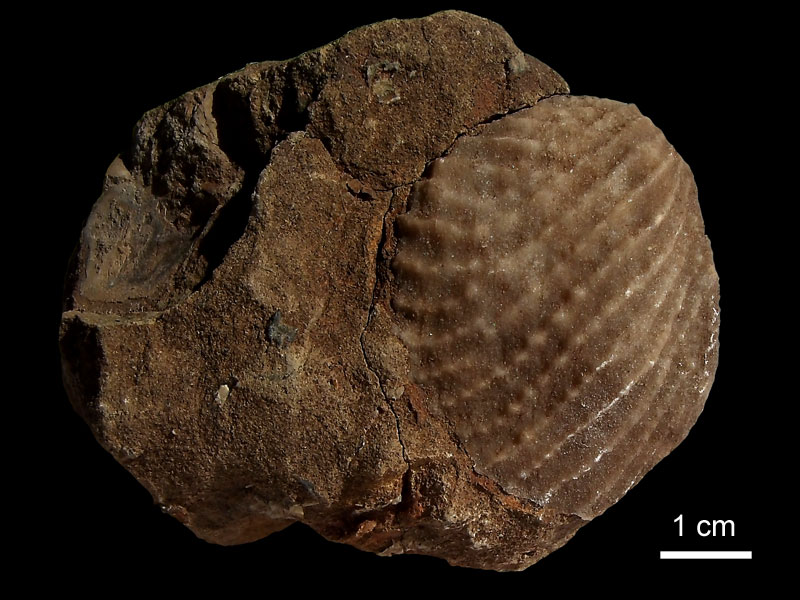
- Fossilized shell of the Jurassic-Cretaceous marine bivalve Myophorella
  †Myophorella
  - †Myophorella argo – or unidentified comparable form
- †Neogondolella
- †Nerinea
- †Olcostephanus
- †Ophthalmidium
- Ostrea
- †Otoscaphites
- †Pachus – tentative report
- †Pachydiscus
- †Peronidella
- Pholadomya
- †Phylloceras
- †Phyllopachyceras
- †Plagiostoma – tentative report
- †Platymya
- Plicatula
- †Radium – type locality for genus
- †Scalarites
- †Scaphites
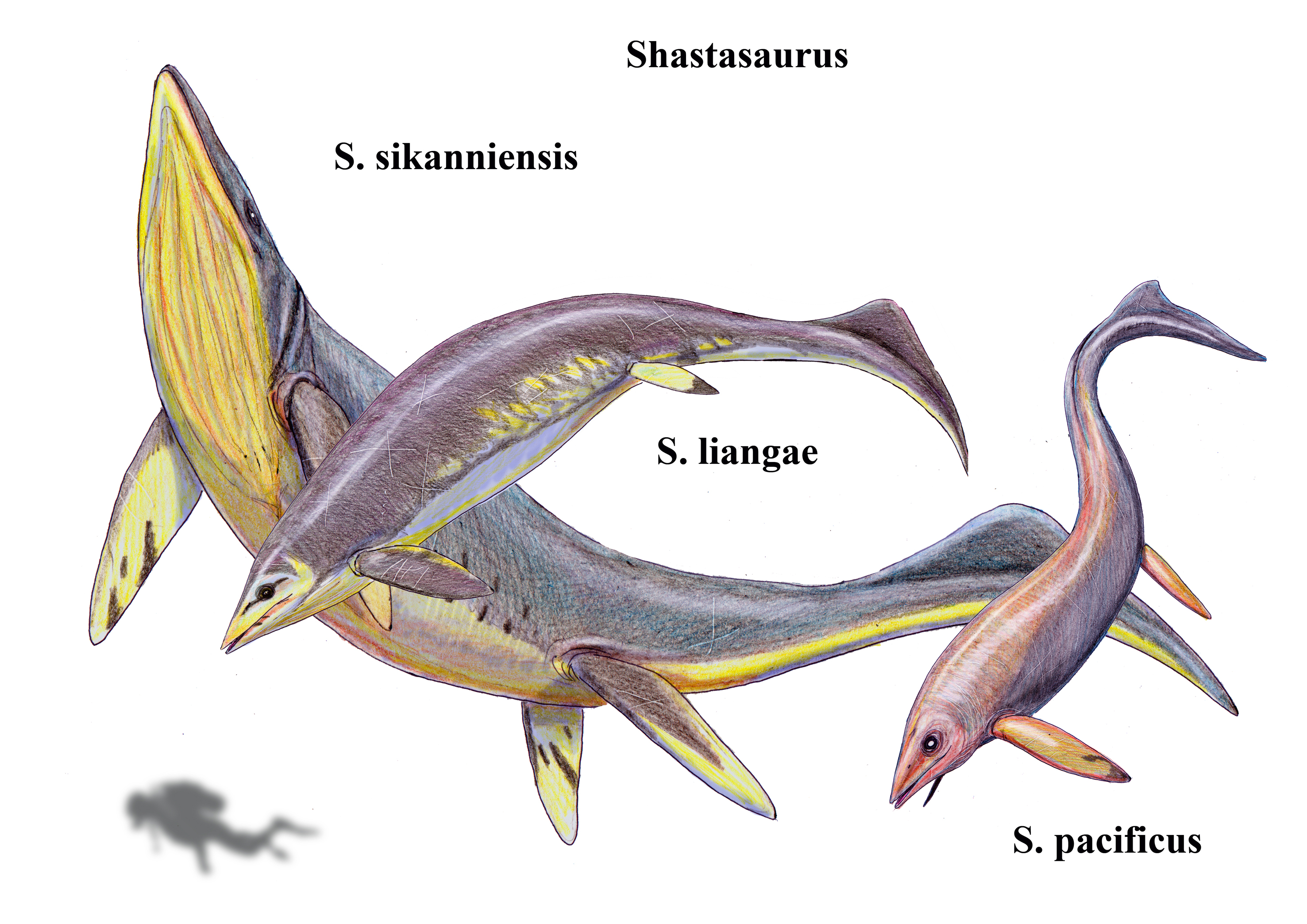
- Life restoration of three species of the Middle-Late Triassic ichthyosaur genus Shastasaurus
  †Shastasaurus
  - †Shastasaurus pacificus – or unidentified comparable form
- †Spitidiscus
- †Thamnasteria
- †Tragodesmoceras
- †Trigonia
  - †Trigonia montanaensis
- Turritella
- †Tutcheria
- Venericardia
- †Vermiceras
- †Xiphotheca
- †Zoneait – type locality for genus

== Cenozoic ==
=== Selected Cenozoic taxa of Oregon ===
- Abies
- †Acamptogenotia
- Acanthocardia
- Abies
- †Acamptogenotia
- Acanthocardia
- Acer
- Acmaea
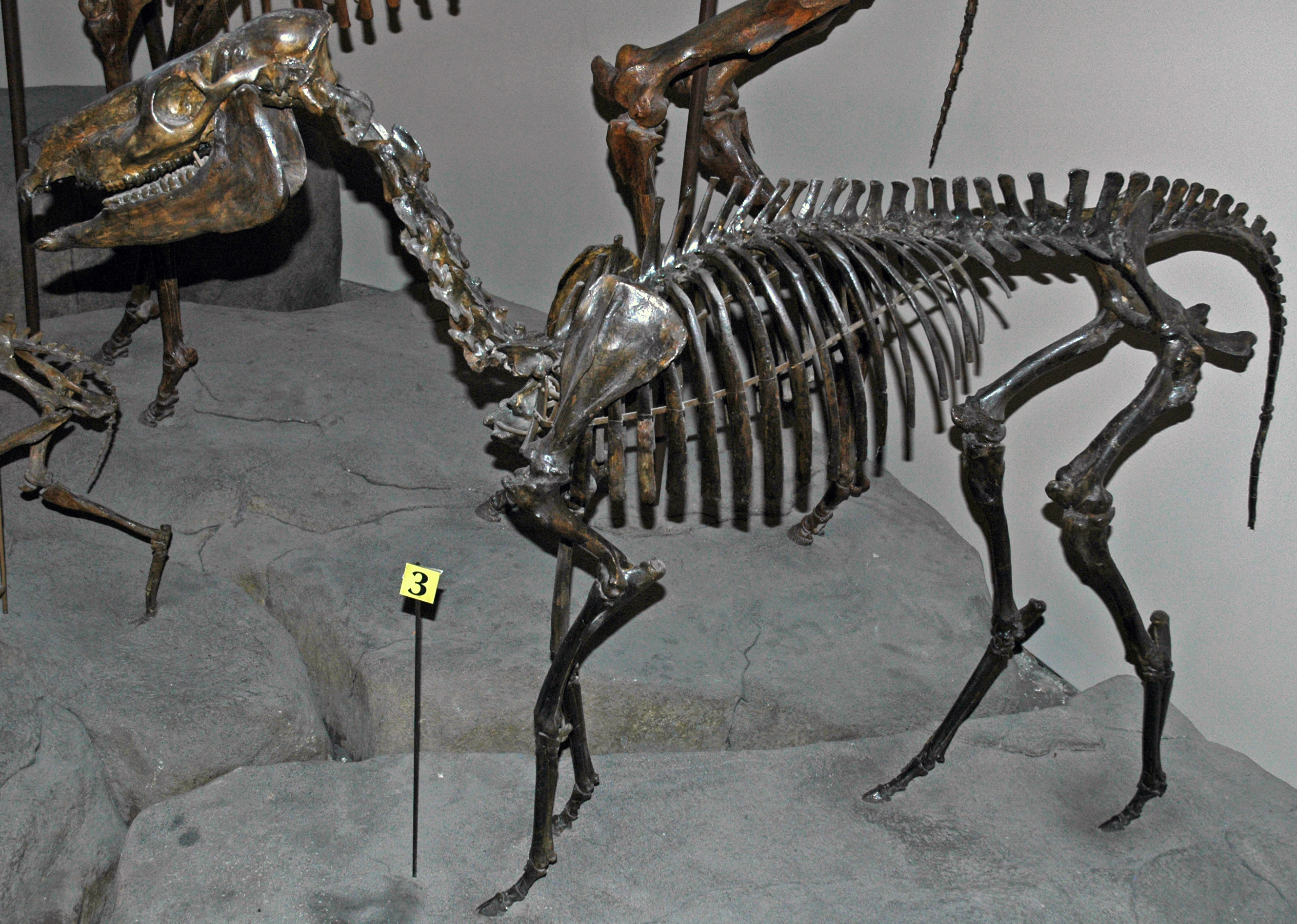
- Mounted fossilized skeleton of the Miocene horse Acritohippus
  †Acritohippus
  - †Acritohippus isonesus
- Acteon
- †Actinidia
  - †Actinidia oregonensis
- Admete
- Aechmophorus
  - †Aechmophorus occidentalis
- †Aesculus
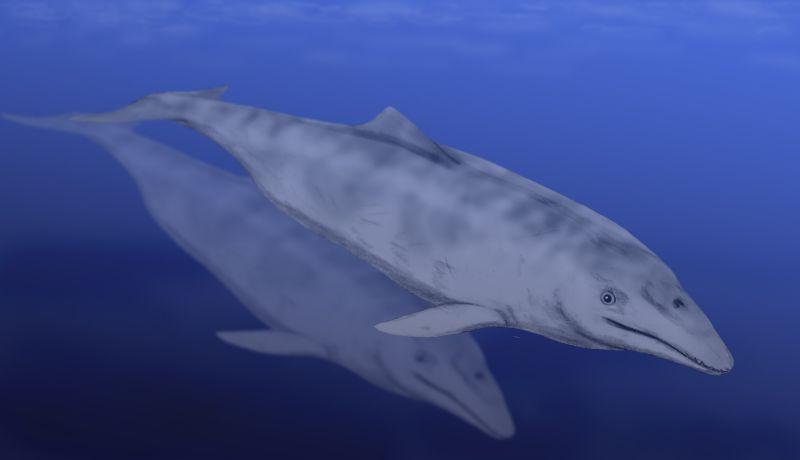
- Life restoration of the Oligocene baleen whale Aetiocetus
  †Aetiocetus – type locality for genus
  - †Aetiocetus cotylalveus – type locality for species
- Aforia
- Agelaius – tentative report
- †Agriochoerus
- Aix
  - †Aix sponsa
- Alangium
- Alnus
  - †Alnus heterodonta
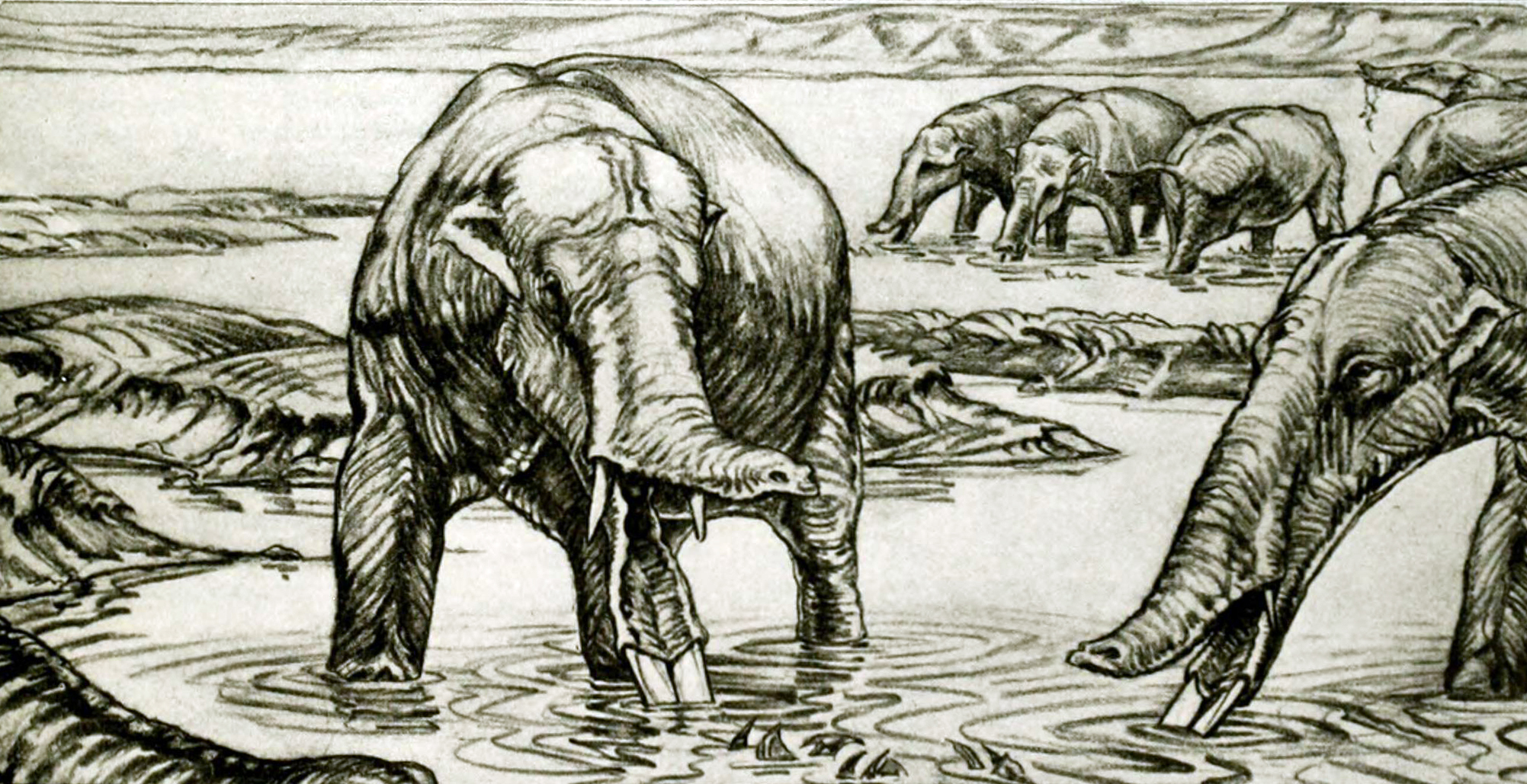
- Life restoration of the Miocene elephant relative Amebelodon. Margret Flinsch (1932).
  †Amebelodon
- Amelanchier
- Ammospermophilus
- Ampelocissus
- †Amphicyon
  - †Amphicyon frendens
  - †Amphicyon galushai – or unidentified comparable form
- Amphissa
- †Ampullina
- †Anabernicula
- Anadara
- †Anamirta
- Anas
  - †Anas acuta
  - †Anas americana
  - †Anas boschas
  - †Anas carolinensis
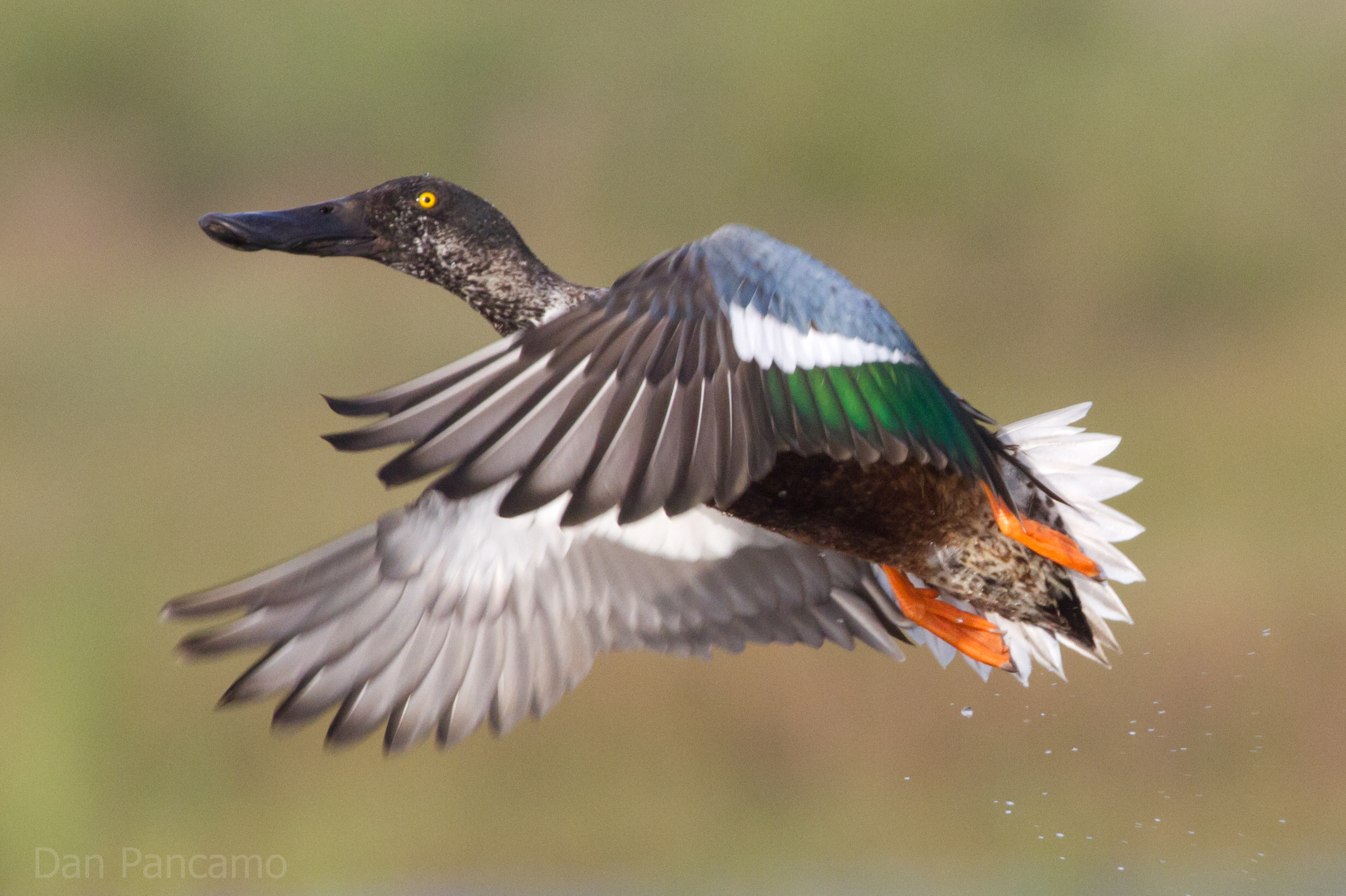
  - A living Spatula clypeata, or northern shoveler
    †Anas clypeata
  - †Anas cyanoptera
  - †Anas discors
  - †Anas platyrhynchos
- Ancilla
- Anona
- Anser
  - †Anser albifrons
  - †Anser condoni – type locality for species
- Antillophos
- Antilocapra
  - †Antilocapra americana – or unidentified comparable form
- Aphananthe
- †Aphelops
- Aquila
  - †Aquila chrysaetos
- Arbacia
- †Archaeocyon
- †Archaeohippus
- †Archaeotherium
- Architectonica
- †Arctodus
- Ardea
  - †Ardea herodias
- Argobuccinum
- †Ascosphaera
- Astraea
- Astreopora
- Astropecten
- †Aturia
- †Aucuba
- Aythya
  - †Aythya marila
- Balaena
- Balaenoptera
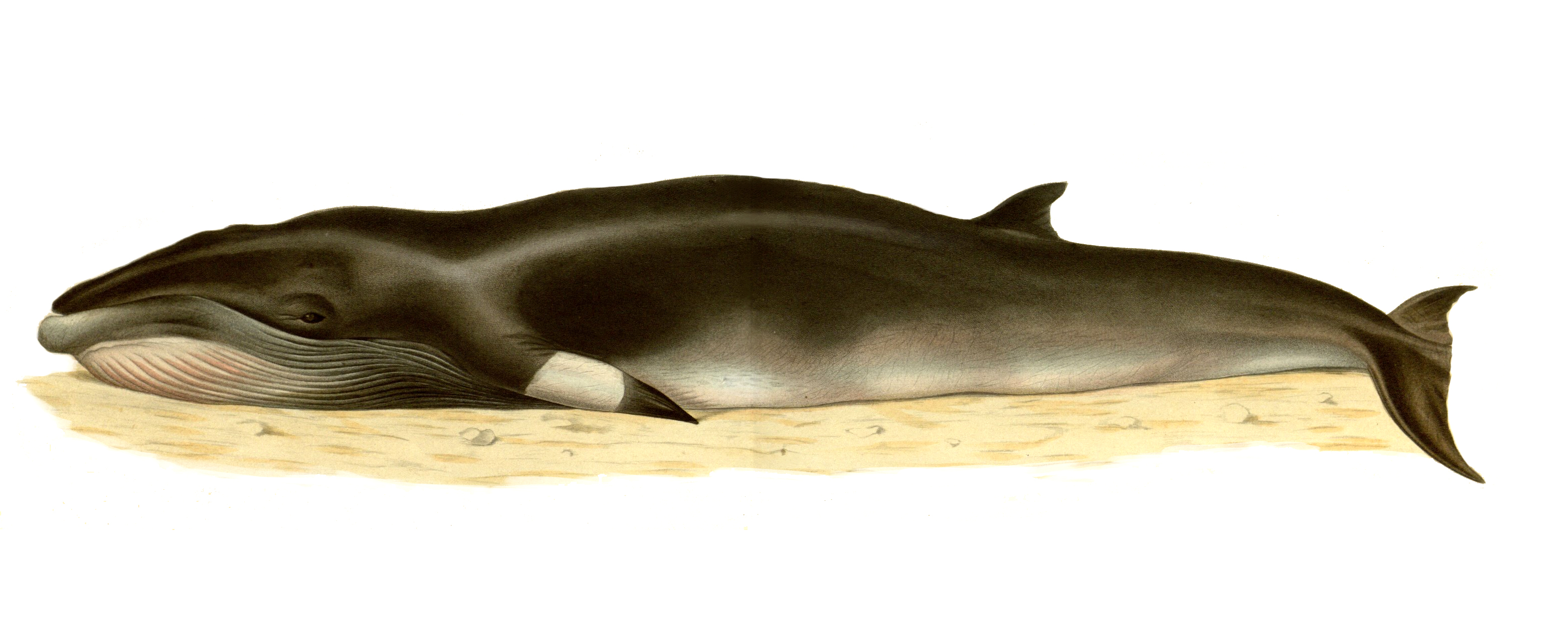
  - Illustration of a living Balaenoptera acutorostrata, or common minke whale
    †Balaenoptera acutorostrata – or unidentified comparable form
- Balanophyllia
  - †Balanophyllia elegans
- Balanus
- Bartramia
- †Basirepomys
- Bathybembix
- Bathytoma
- Bela
- Betula
- Bittium
- †Bonellitia
- Boreotrophon
  - †Boreotrophon stuarti
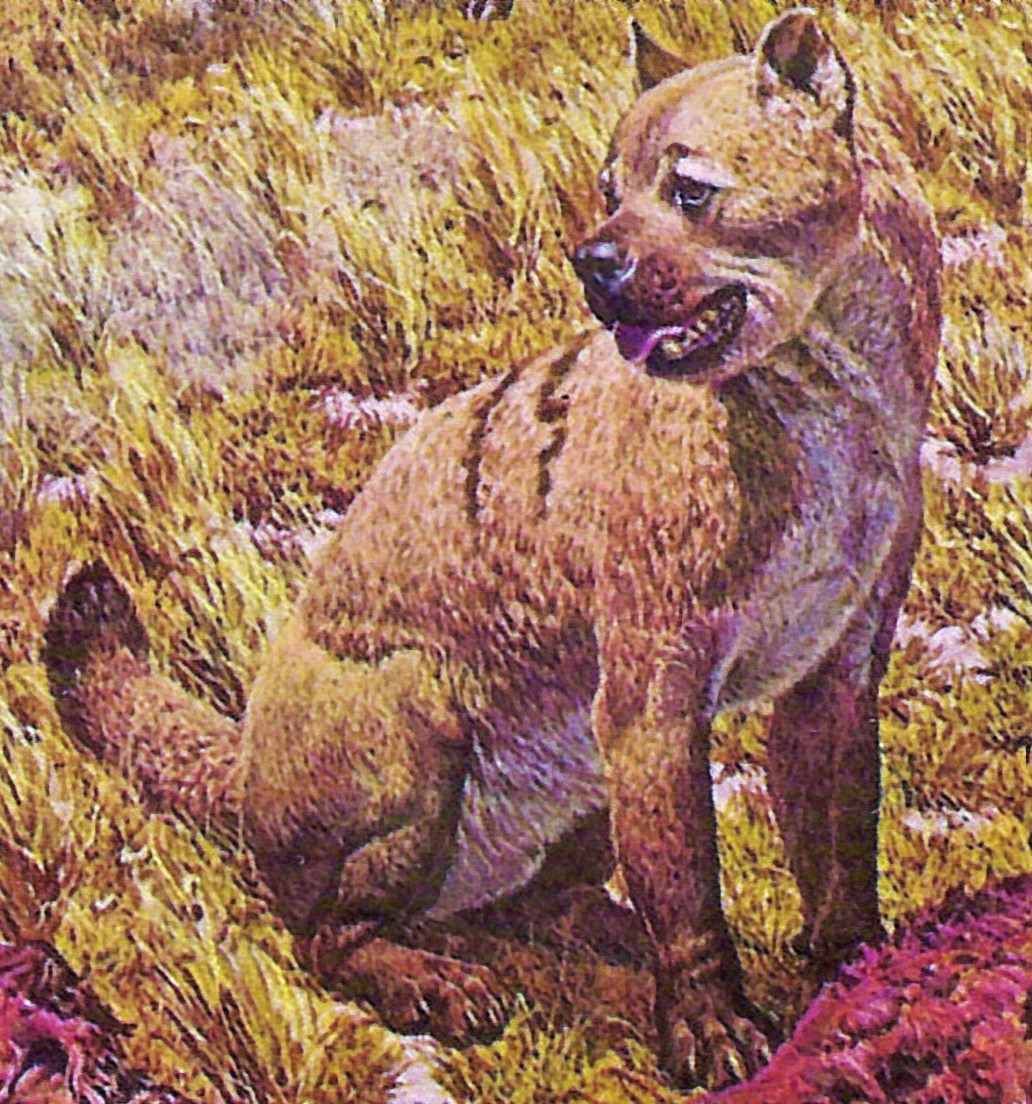
- Restoration of two of the Miocene-Pliocene bone-crushing dog genus Borophagus preying on a camel. Jay Matternes (1964).
  †Borophagus
  - †Borophagus pugnator
  - †Borophagus secundus – or unidentified comparable form
- Botaurus
  - †Botaurus lentiginosus
- Brachidontes
- Branta
  - †Branta bernicla
  - †Branta canadensis
- Bubo
  - †Bubo virginianus
- Buccinum
  - †Buccinum strigillatum
- Bullia
- †Bumelia – tentative report
- Cadulus
- Calliostoma
- Callista
- Callorhinus – tentative report
- †Calocedrus
- †Calycocarpum
- Calyptraea
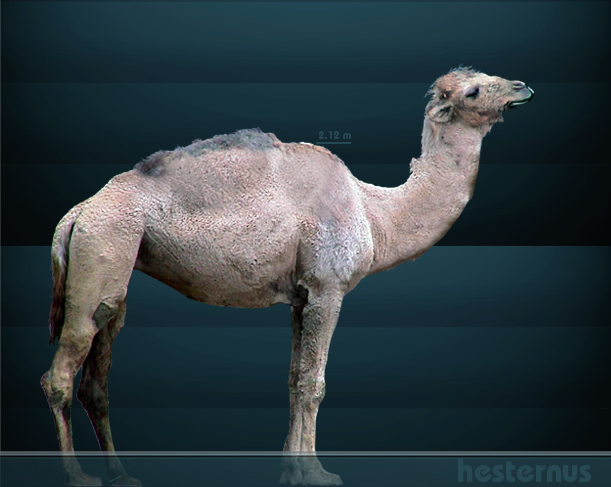
- Life restoration of the Pliocene-Holocene camel Camelops
  †Camelops
  - †Camelops hesternus
- Cancellaria
- Canis
  - †Canis dirus – or unidentified comparable form
  - †Canis edwardii
  - †Canis latrans
  - †Canis lupus – or unidentified comparable form
- †Carpocyon
- Carya
- Caryophyllia
- Castanea
- Castanopsis
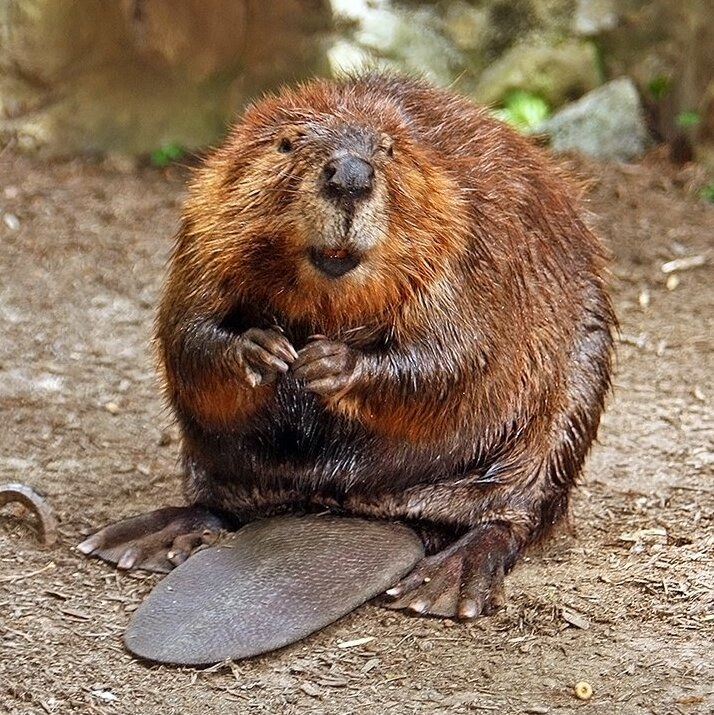
- A living Castor canadensis, or North American beaver
  Castor
- †Catalpa
- Cedrela
- Celtis
- †Centrocercus
  - †Centrocercus urophasianus
- Cercidiphyllum
- Cercis
- Cerithiopsis
- †Charitonetta
  - †Charitonetta albeola
- Chen
  - †Chen rossii
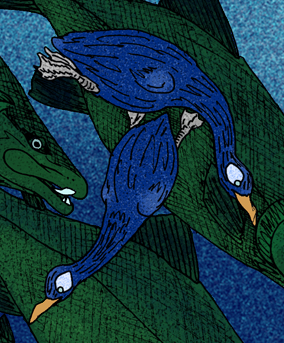
- Life restoration of the Pleistocene-Holocene Chendytes, or Law's diving-goose
  †Chendytes
- Chione
- Chlidonias
  - †Chlidonias nigra
- Chlorostoma
- †Choerodon
- †Chrysodomus
- Circus
- Cladrastis
- Clangula
  - †Clangula hyemalis
- Cleyera
- Clinocardium
  - †Clinocardium nuttallii
- Cochliolepis – tentative report
- Colaptes
- †Colodon
- Columbella
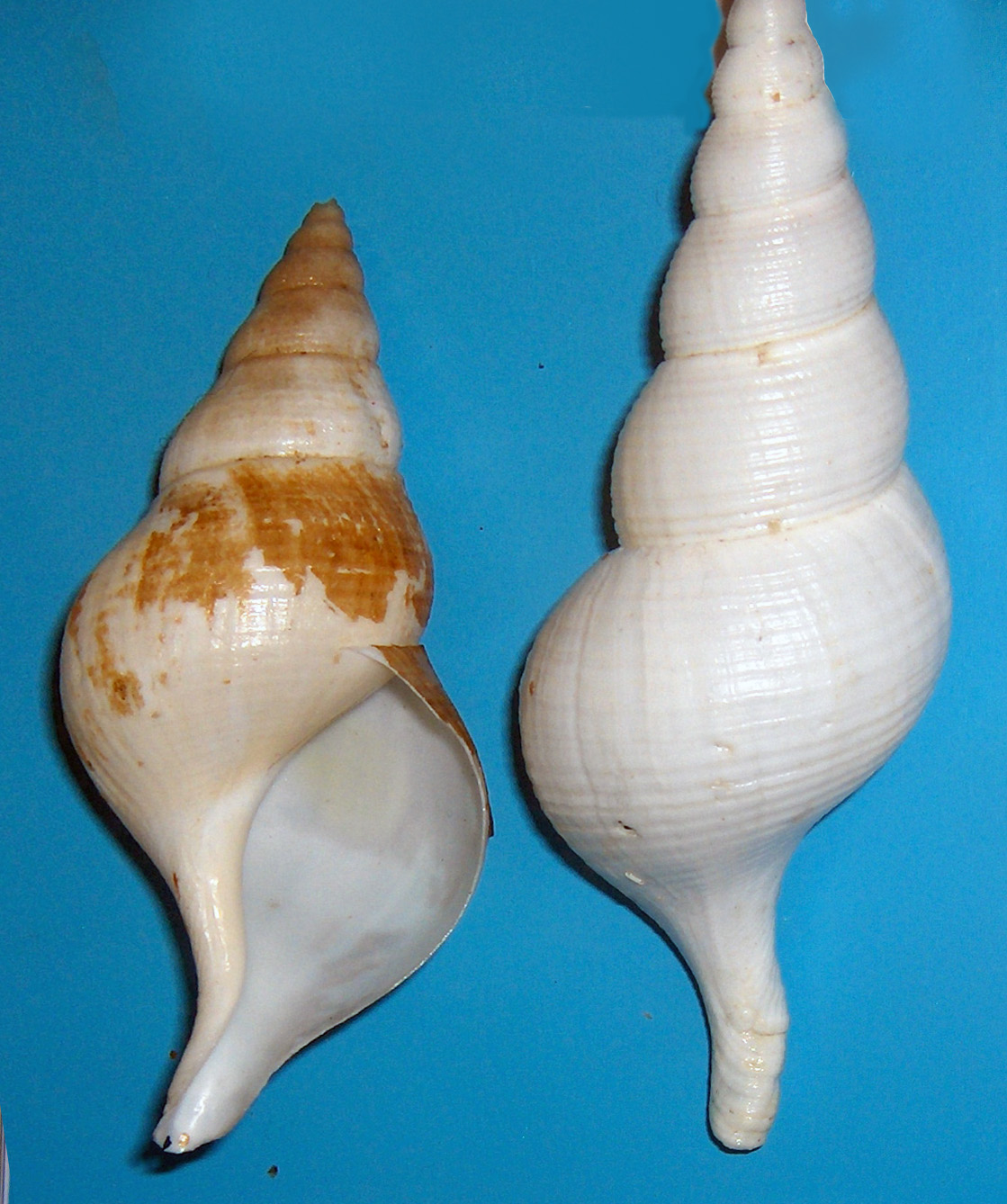
- Shells in differing orientations of Colus whelk sea snails
  Colus – tentative report
- Comitas
  - †Comitas monile
  - †Comitas oregonensis
  - †Comitas spencerensis
- Comptonia
- Conomitra
- Conus
- †Cophocetus – type locality for genus
- Corbula
- †Cormocyon
- Cornus
  - †Cornus clarnensis
- †Cornwallius
- Corvus
  - †Corvus corax
- †Coryloides
  - †Coryloides hancockii
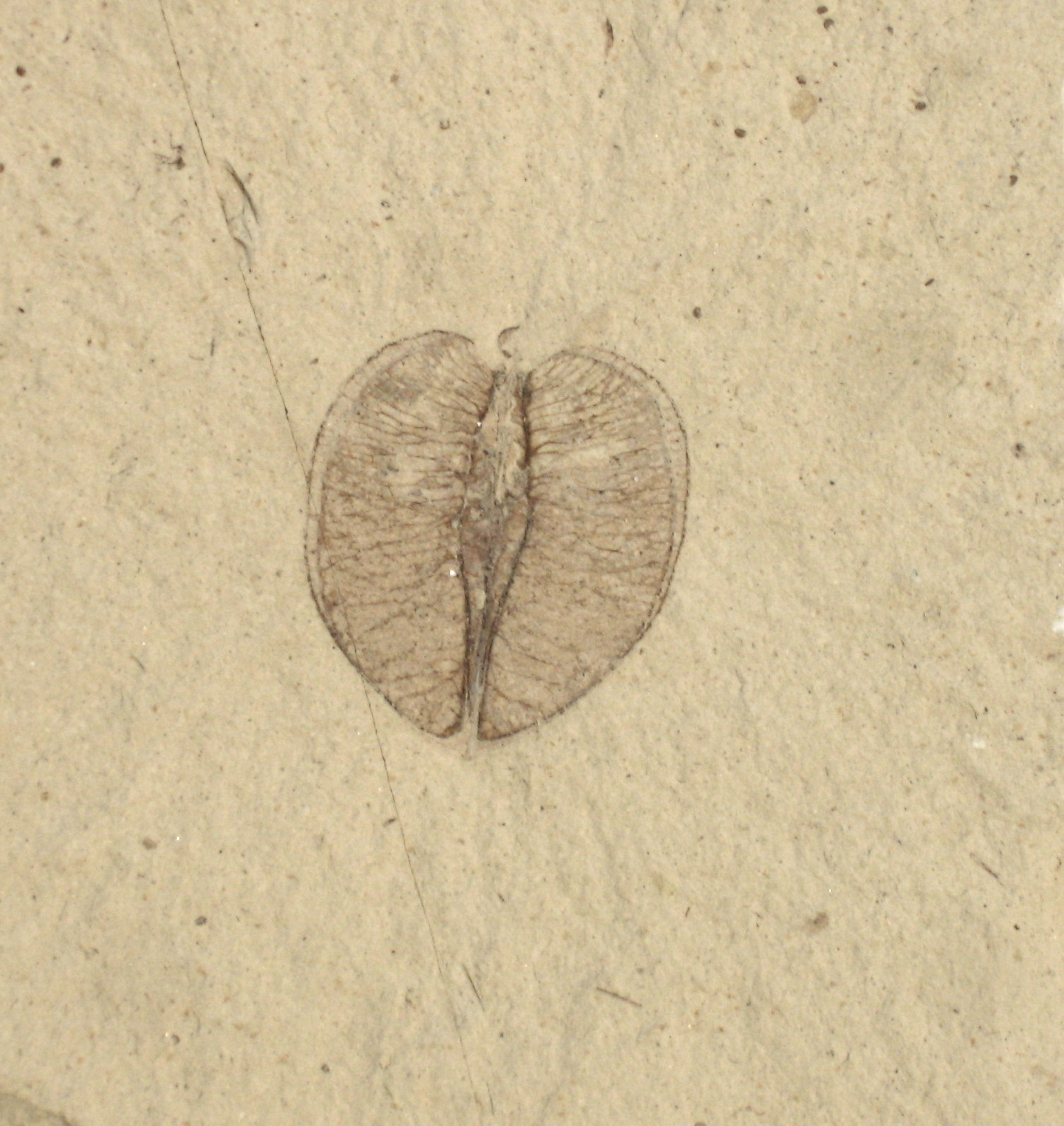
- Fossilized fruit of a Craigia plant
  Craigia
- Crataegus
- Crenella
- Crepidula
  - †Crepidula adunca
  - †Crepidula grandis – or unidentified comparable form
- Cryptonatica
  - †Cryptonatica affinis
- Cryptotis
- †Cunninghamia
- Cyclocardia
- Cygnus
  - †Cygnus paloregonus
- Cymatium
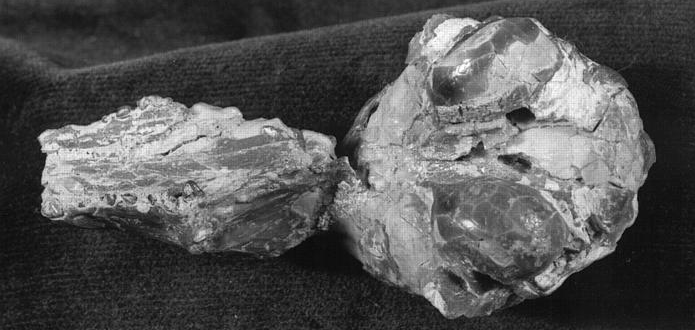
- Underside of a fossilized cranium of the Oligocene-Miocene bone-crushing dog Cynarctoides
  †Cynarctoides
  - †Cynarctoides lemur
  - †Cynarctoides luskensis – or unidentified comparable form
- †Cynelos
- †Daeodon
  - †Dafila acuta
- †Daphoenodon
- †Daphoenus
  - †Daphoenus socialis
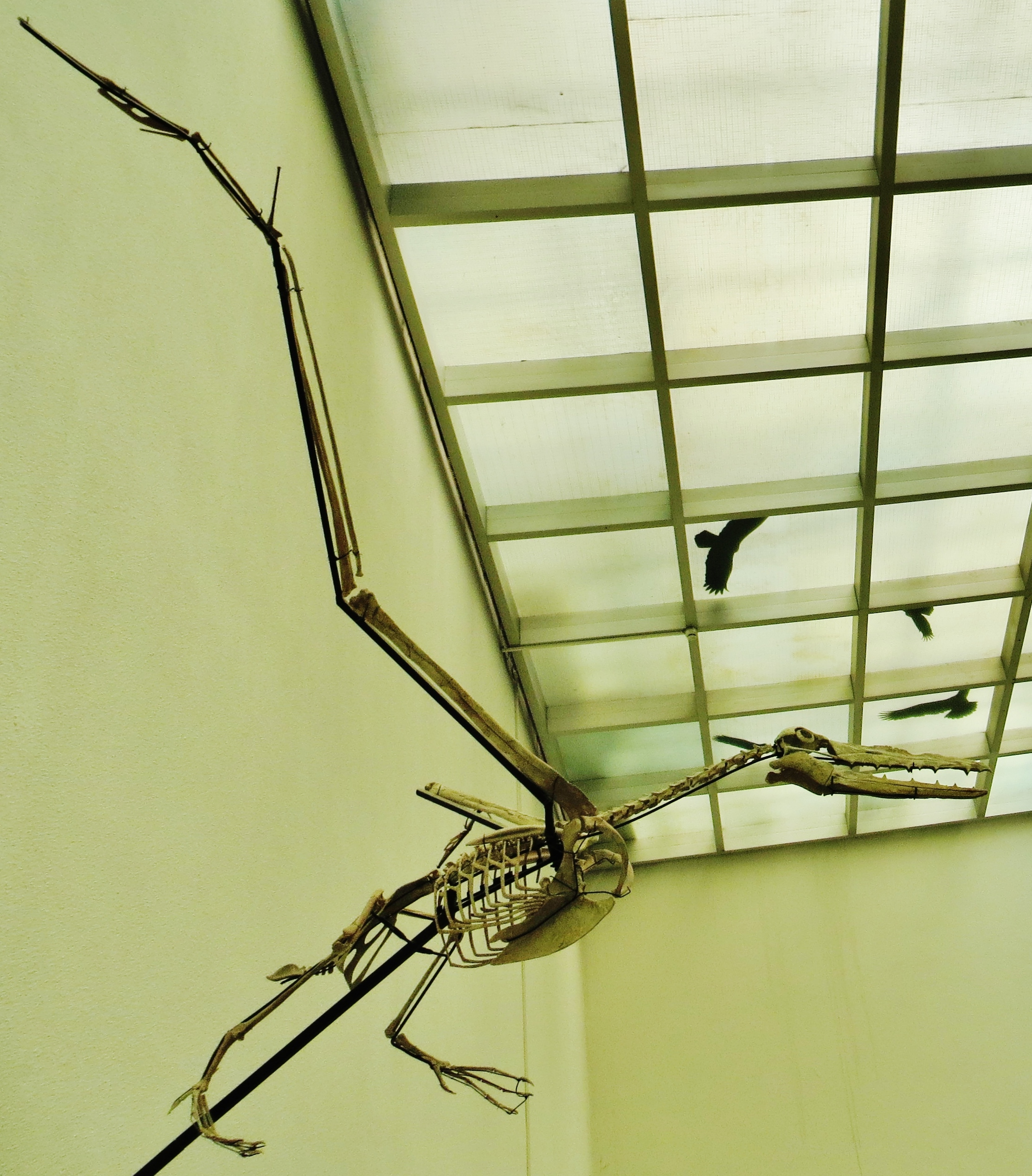
- Mounted fossilized skeleton of the Eocene pseudo-toothed bird Dasornis
  †Dasornis – or unidentified related form
- Decodon
- Dendragapus – type locality for genus
- Dentalium
- †Desmatippus
- †Desmatochoerus
- †Desmatophoca
  - †Desmatophoca oregonensis
- †Desmocyon
- †Desmostylus
  - †Desmostylus hesperus – type locality for species
- †Diceratherium
- †Dilophodelphis – type locality for genus
- †Dinaelurus
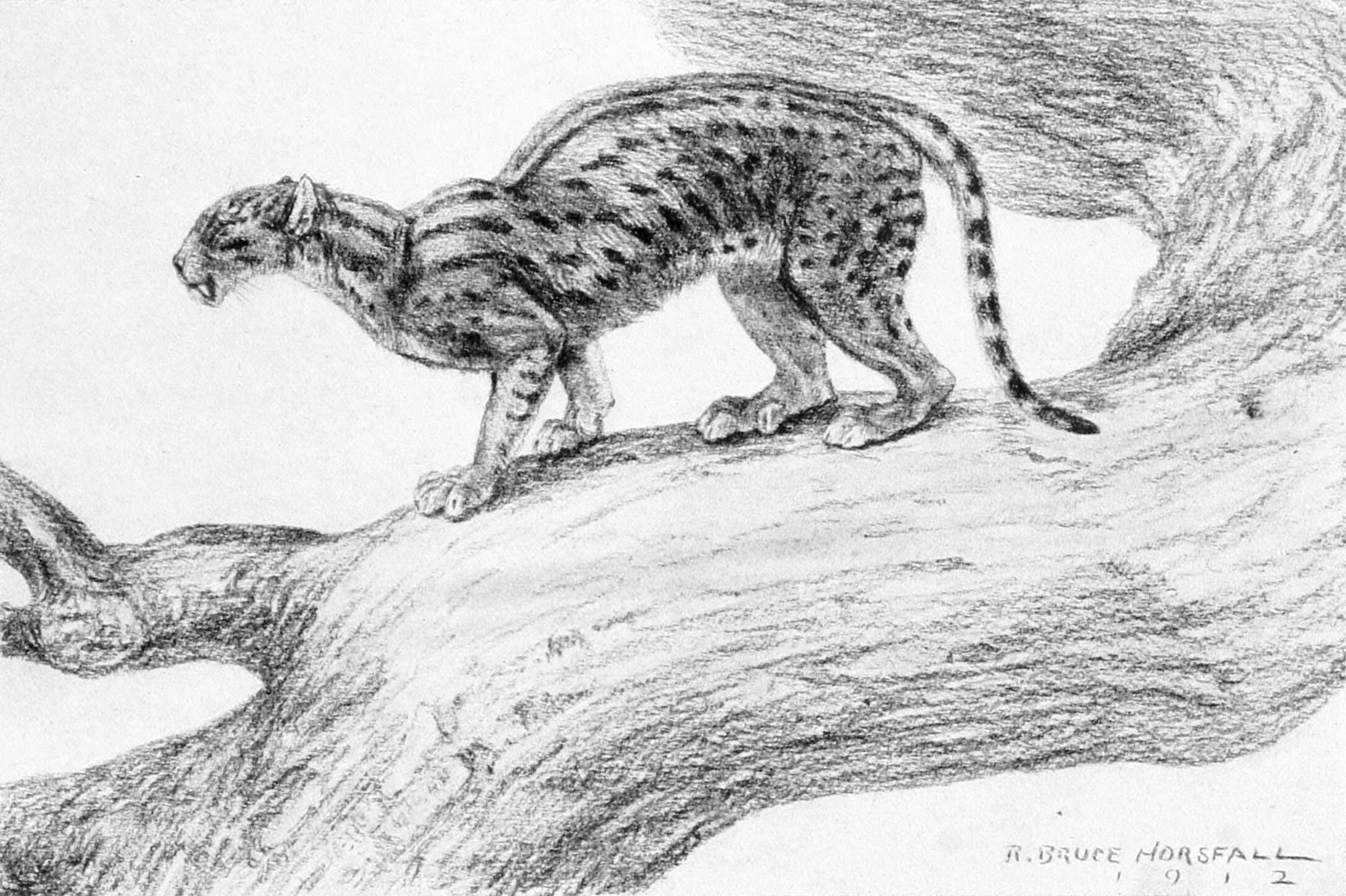
- Life restoration of the Eocene-Miocene false saber-toothed cat Dinictis. Robert Bruce Horsfall (1913).
  †Dinictis
  - †Dinictis cyclops
- †Diploporus
  - †Diploporus torreyoides
- †Dipoides
- †Diprionomys
- Dipteronia
- Discinisca
- Dosinia
- †Dromomeryx
  - †Dromomeryx borealis
- †Dyticonastis – type locality for genus
  - †Dyticonastis rensbergeri – type locality for species
- Echinophoria
- †Ekgmowechashala
- †Emmenopterys
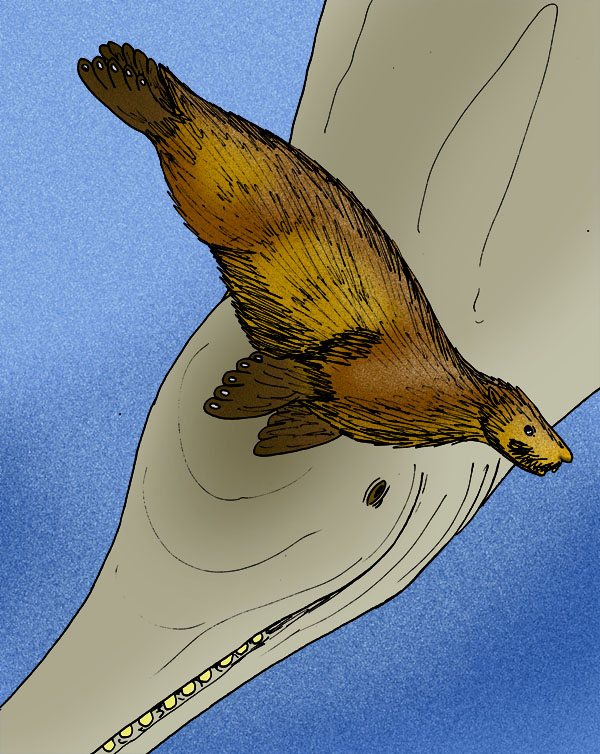
- Life restoration of the Oligocene-Miocene Enaliarctos and the toothed whale Macrodelphinus (background)
  †Enaliarctos
  - †Enaliarctos barnesi – type locality for species
  - †Enaliarctos emlongi – type locality for species
  - †Enaliarctos mitchelli
  - †Enaliarctos tedfordi – type locality for species
- Engelhardia
- Enhydra
- †Enhydrocyon
- †Ensete
- †Epicyon
  - †Epicyon haydeni
- †Epihippus
- Epitonium
- †Eporeodon
- †Equisetum
- Equus
  - †Erismatura jamaicensis
- Erolia
- Ervilia – tentative report
- †Eucastor
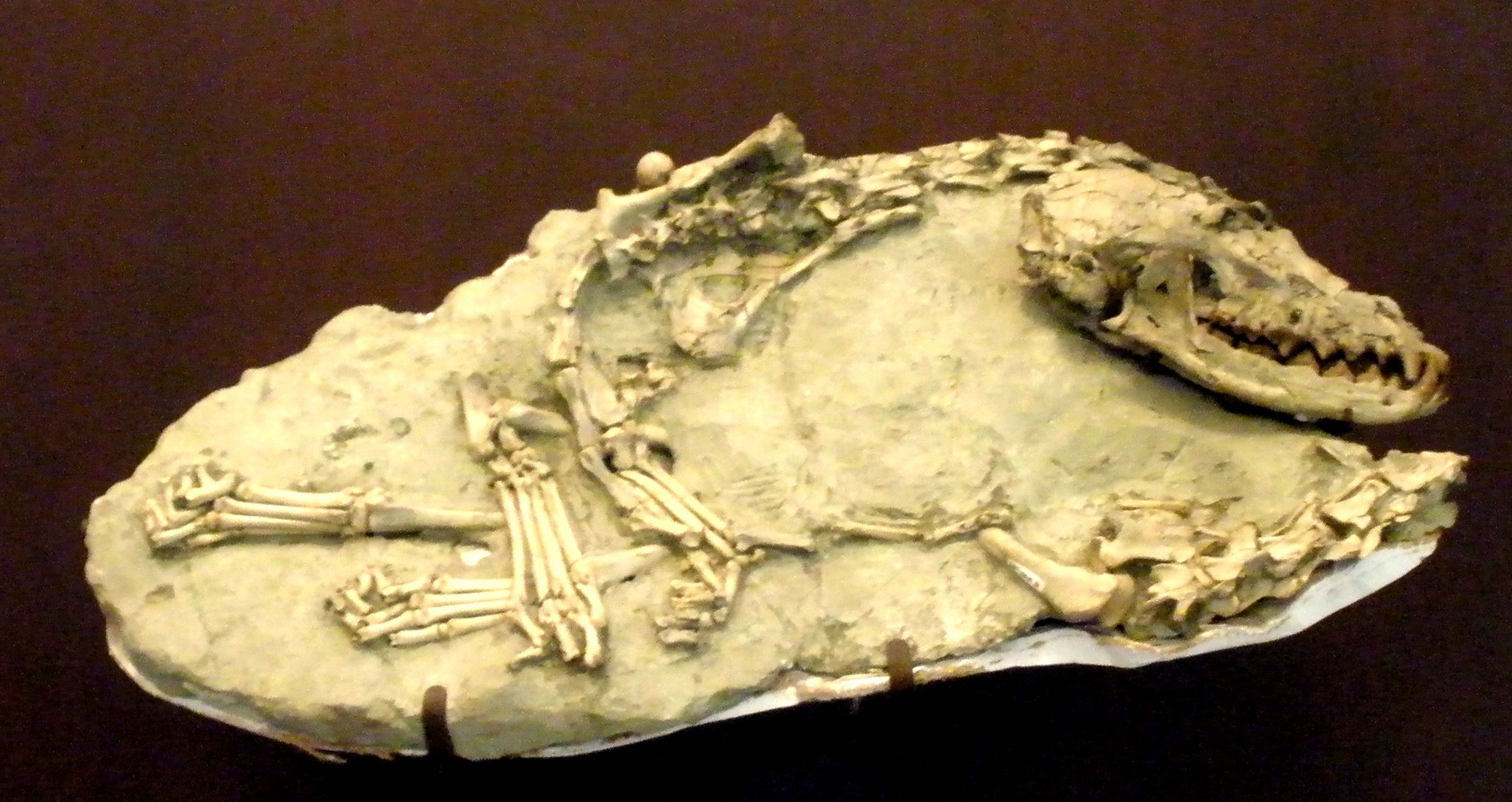
- Fossilized skeleton of the Miocene-Pliocene coyote-like canine Eucyon
  †Eucyon
  - †Eucyon davisi
- †Euoplocyon
- Euphagus
  - †Euphagus cyanocephalus
- Euspira
  - †Euspira pallida
- †Eutrephoceras
- Exbucklandia
- †Exilia
- Fagus
- Falco
- Ficus
- Fimbria
- Flabellum
- †Floridaceras
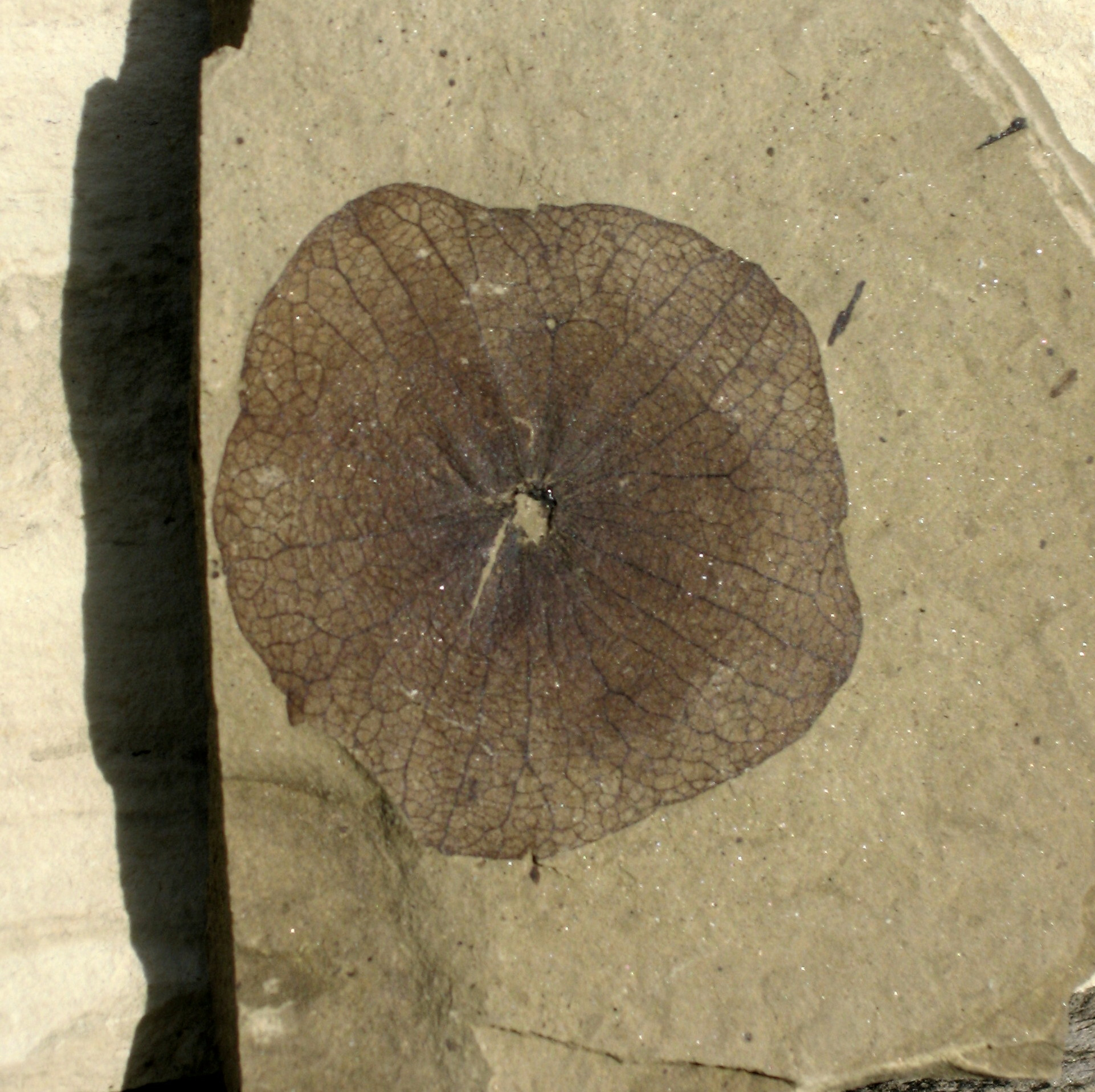
- Fossilized flower of the Eocene-Oligocene mallow relative Florissantia
  †Florissantia
- Fothergilla
- Fraxinus
- Fulgoraria
- Fulgurofusus
- Fulica
  - Fulica americana
- Fusinus
- †Gaillardia
- Gari – tentative report
- Gemmula
- †Gentilicamelus
- Glycymeris
- †Goedertius – type locality for genus
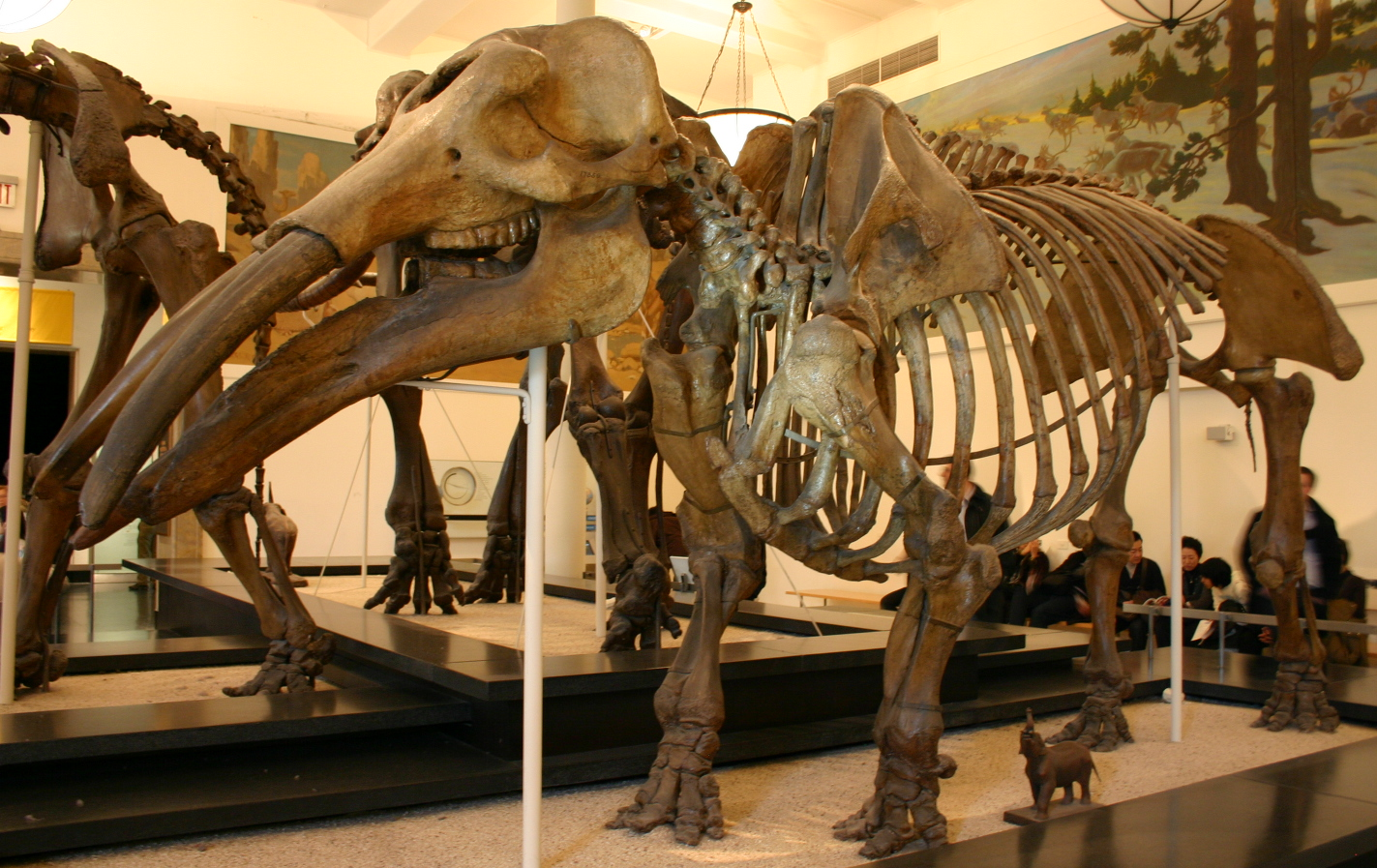
- Mounted fossilized skeleton of the Miocene-Pleistocene elephant relative Gomphotherium
  †Gomphotherium
- Granula
- Gyrineum – report made of unidentified related form or using admittedly obsolete nomenclature
- †Hadrianus
- Halesia
- Haliaeetus
  - †Haliaeetus leucocephalus
- †Haplohippus
- †Hemiauchenia – tentative report
- Heptranchias
  - †Heptranchias howelli
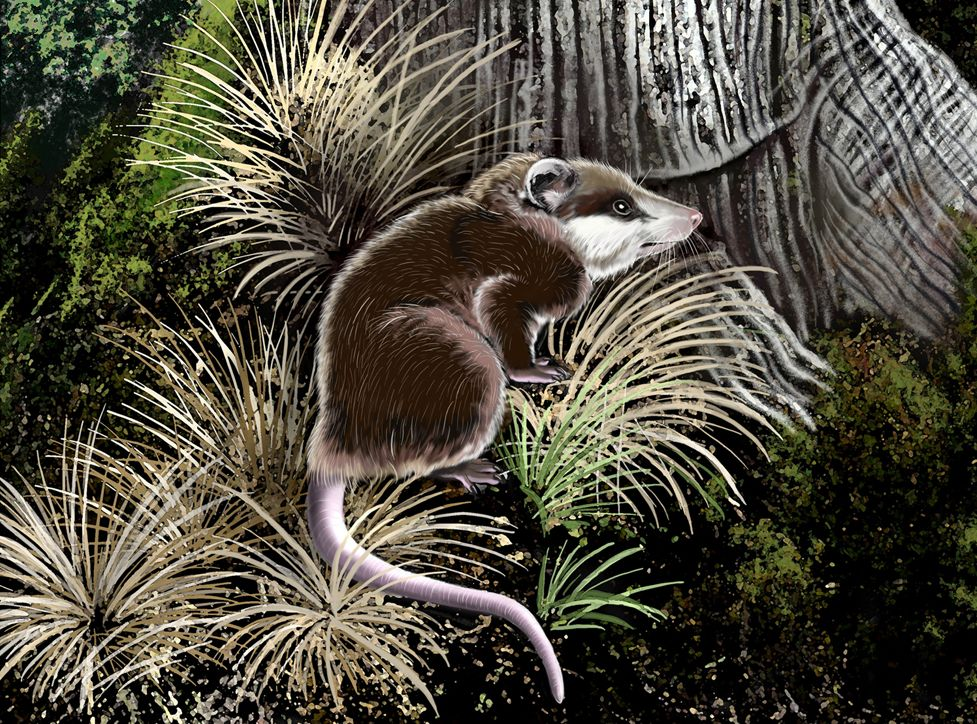
- Life restoration of the Eocene-Miocene mammal Herpetotherium
  †Herpetotherium
- Hiatella
- Himantopus
  - †Himantopus mexicanus
- †Hippotherium
- †Hoplophoneus
- †Hovenia
- Hydrangea
- †Hypertragulus
- †Hypohippus
- †Hypolagus
- †Hypsidoris
- †Hypsiops
- †Hyrachyus
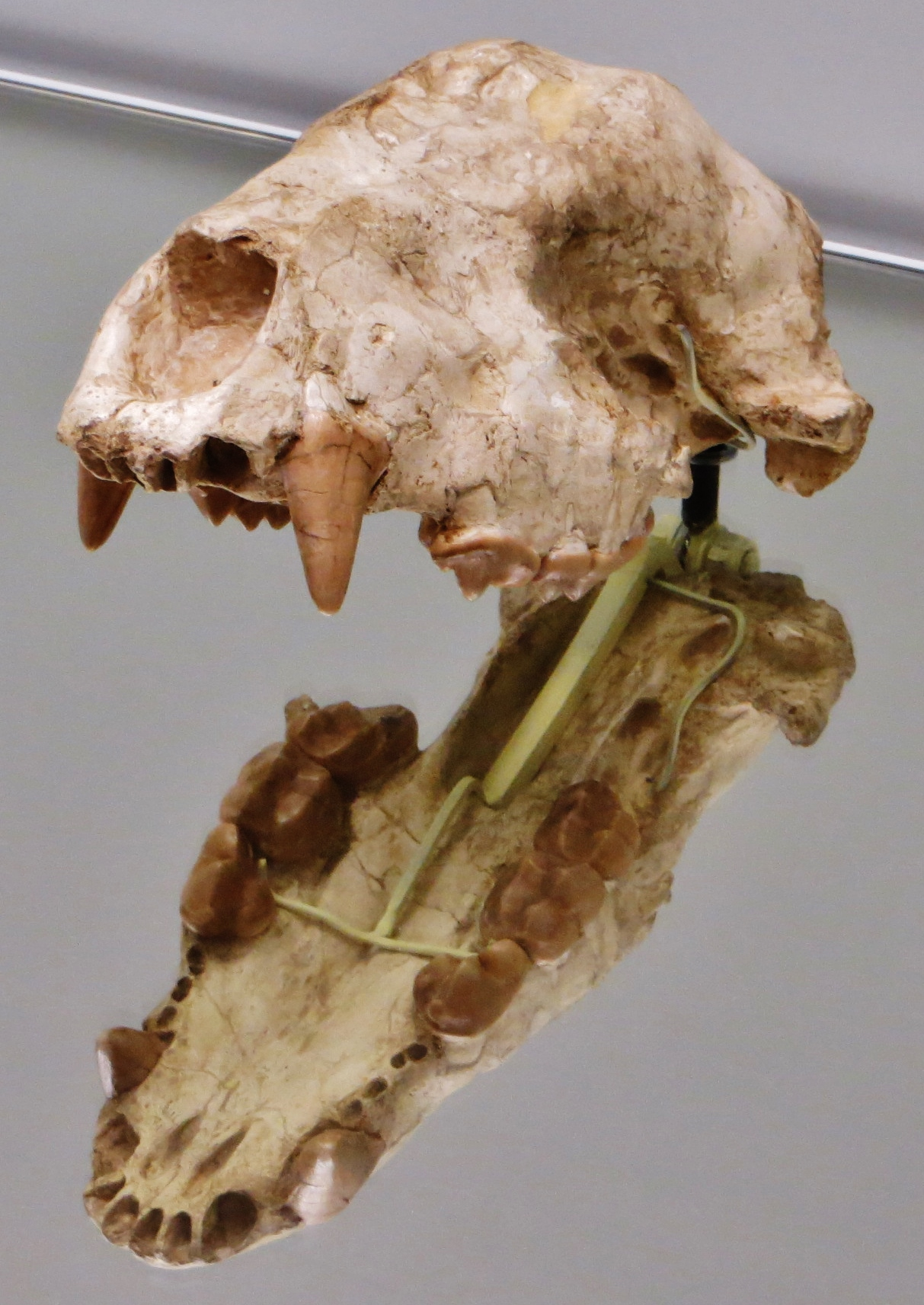
- Fossilized skull of the Miocene bear Indarctos
  †Indarctos
- Isurus
  - †Isurus planus
- Juglans
- †Kalobatippus
- †Kardiasperma
  - †Kardiasperma parvum
- Kellia
- †Keteleeria
- †Kolponomos
  - †Kolponomos newportensis – type locality for species
- Lacuna
  - †Lacuna vincta
- Larus
  - †Larus argentatus
  - †Larus californicus
  - †Larus philadelphia
- Lepeta
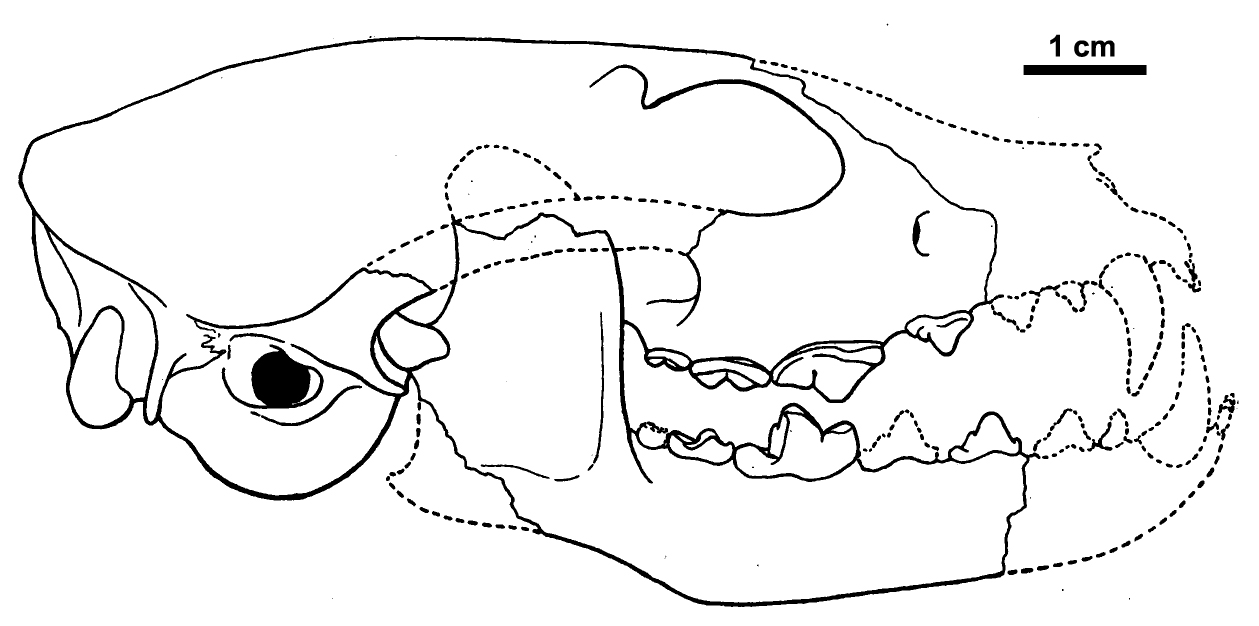
- Illustration of a fossilized skull of the Oligocene-Miocene dog Leptocyon
  †Leptocyon
- Lepus
- Leukoma
  - †Leukoma staminea
- Limnodromus
  - †Limnodromus griseus – tentative report
- Lindera
- Liquidambar
- †Lithocarpus
- Littorina
- Lophodytes
  - †Lophodytes cucullatus
- †Lophortyx
- Lynx
- Lytechinus
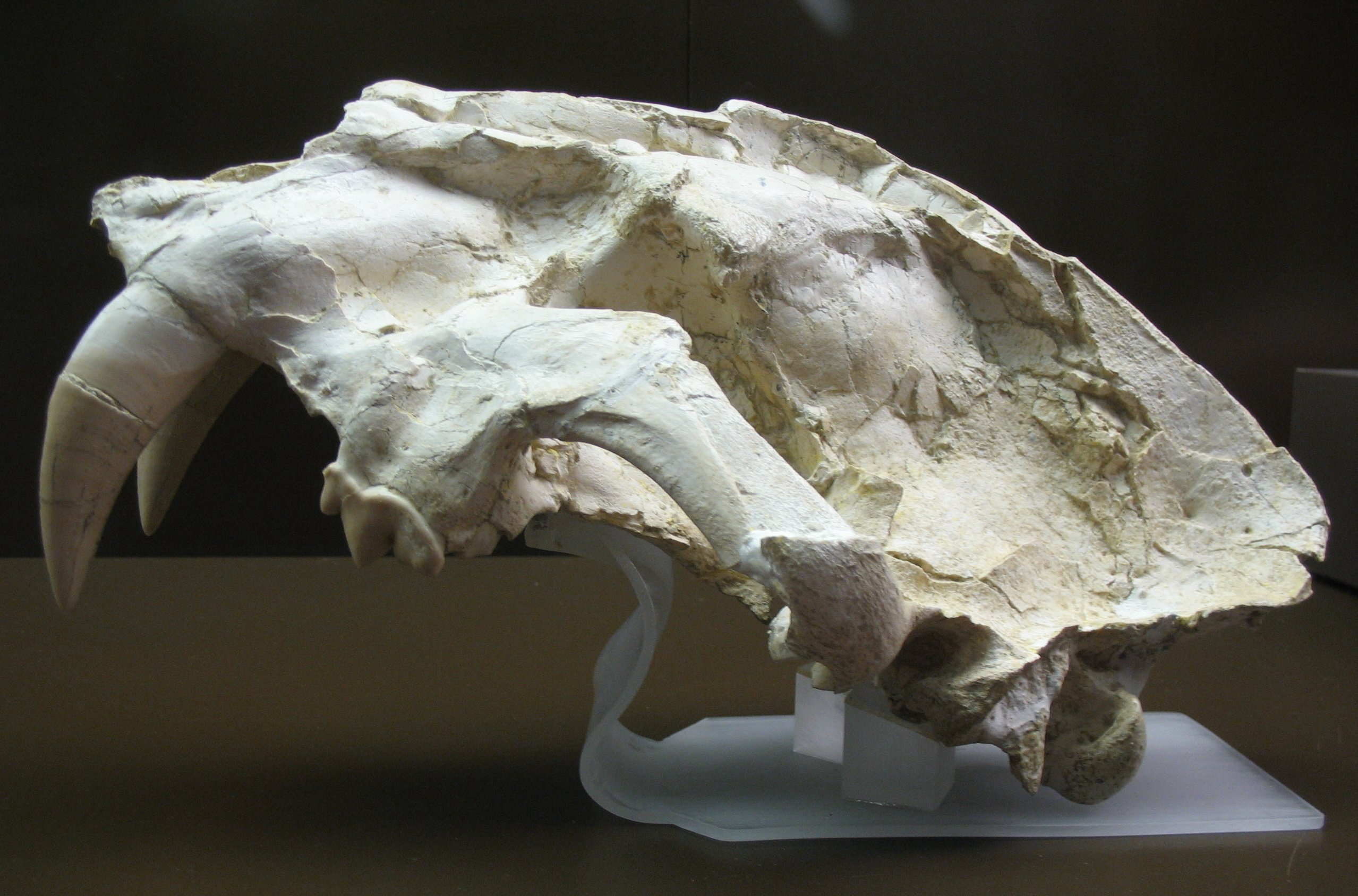
- Fossilized cranium of the Miocene-Pleistocene saber-toothed cat Machairodus
  †Machairodus
- †Machilus
- Macoma
  - †Macoma nasuta
- Macrocallista
- Magnolia
- Mahonia
- †Malus – or unidentified comparable form
- †Mammut
  - †Mammut furlongi – type locality for species
- †Mammuthus
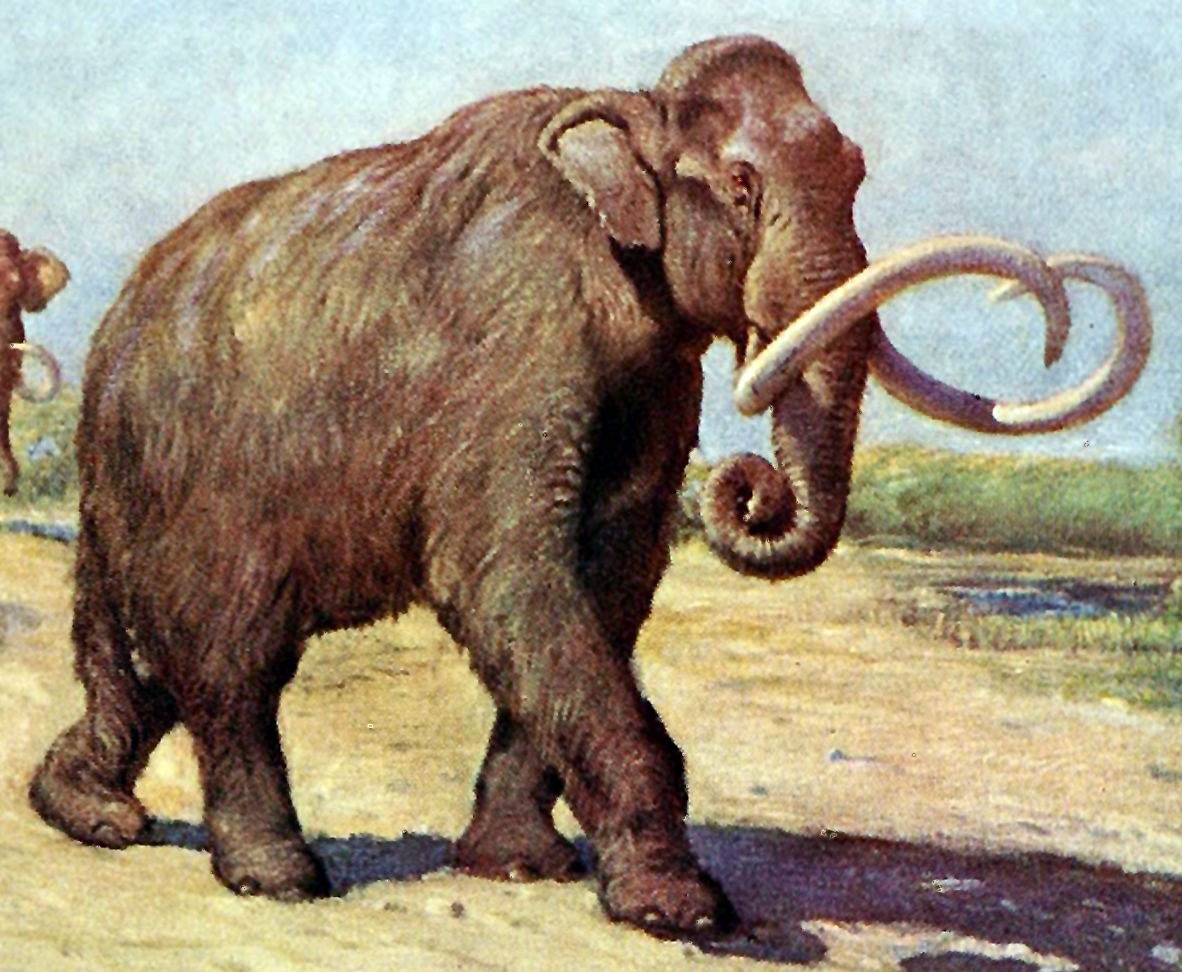
  - Life restoration of a herd of Mammuthus columbi, or Columbian mammoths. The extent of the fur depicted is hypothetical. Charles R. Knight (1909).
    †Mammuthus columbi – tentative report
- Marcia
- Margarites
- Martes
- Martesia
- Mastixia
- Megachasma
- †Megalonyx
- †Megapaloelodus
- †Megatylopus
- Melanitta
  - †Melanitta deglandi
  - †Melanitta perspicillata
- †Meliosma
  - †Meliosma beusekomii
- †Menispermum – or unidentified comparable form
- Mergus
  - †Mergus merganser
  - †Mergus serrator
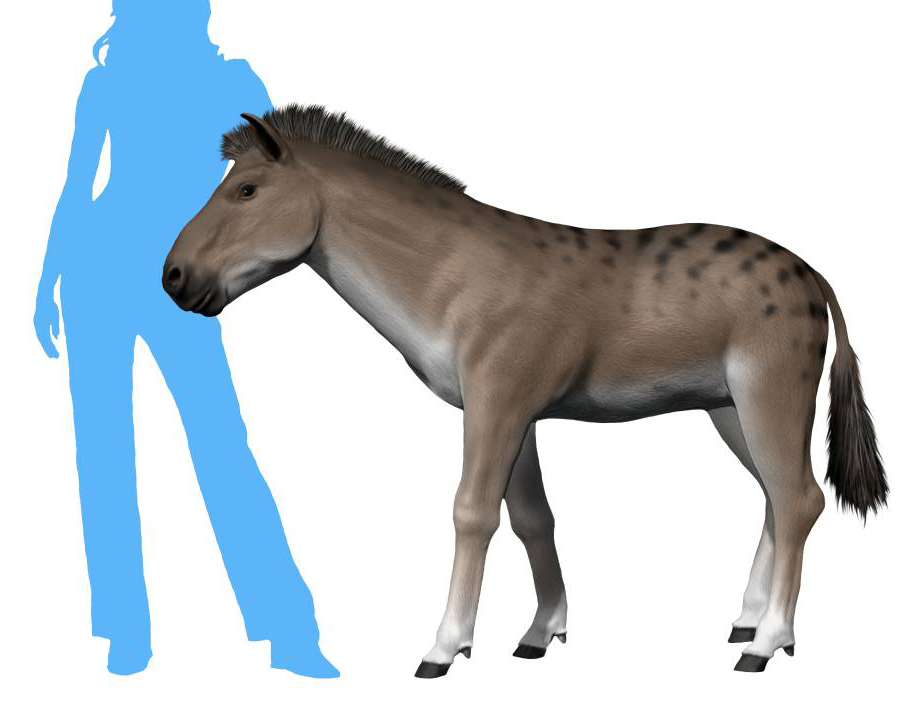
- Restoration of the Miocene three-toed horse Merychippus
  †Merychippus
- †Merychyus
- †Merycochoerus
- †Merycoides
- †Merycoidodon
- †Mesocyon
- †Mesohippus
- †Metalopex
- Metasequoia
  - †Metasequoia occidentalis
- †Microphallus
- Microtus
  - †Microtus montanus
- †Miohippus
- †Miotapirus
- Modiolus
  - †Modiolus modiolus
- Molothrus
  - †Molothrus ater – tentative report
- †Monosaulax
- †Moropus
- Mulinia
- Mustela
- †Mya
  - †Mya truncata
- Myotis – or unidentified comparable form
- Mytilus
  - †Mytilus californianus
  - †Mytilus edulis
- †Nanotragulus – or unidentified comparable form
- Nassarius
- Natica
- †Nautilus
- Nectandra
- †Neohipparion
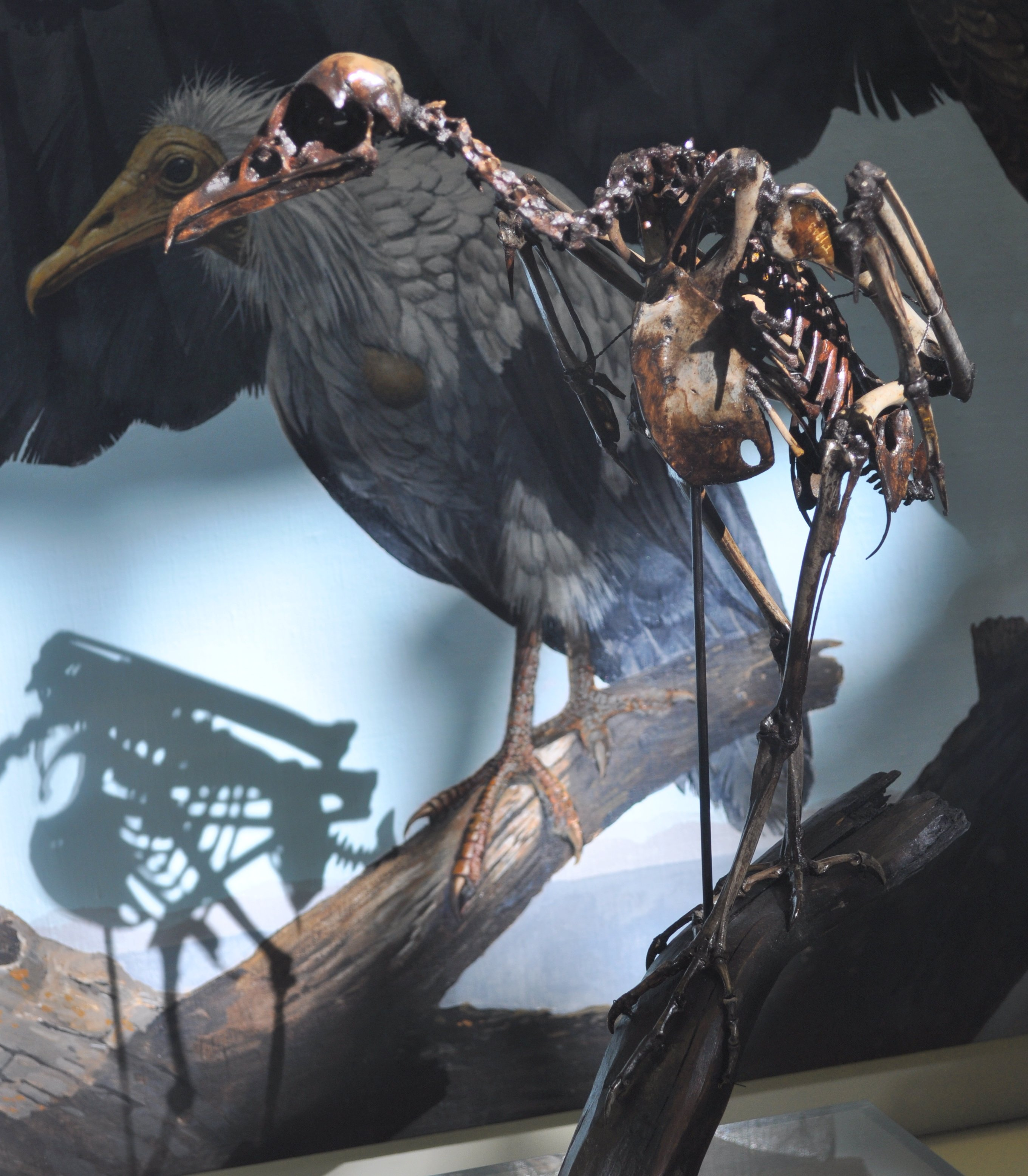
- Mounted fossilized skeleton of the Miocene Neophrontops
  Neophrontops
- Neotamias
- †Neurotrichus – tentative report
- Neverita
- †Nexuotapirus
- Nucella
  - †Nucella lamellosa
- Nucula
- Numenius
  - †Numenius americanus – tentative report
- †Nuphar
- †Nyssa
  - †Nyssa spatulata
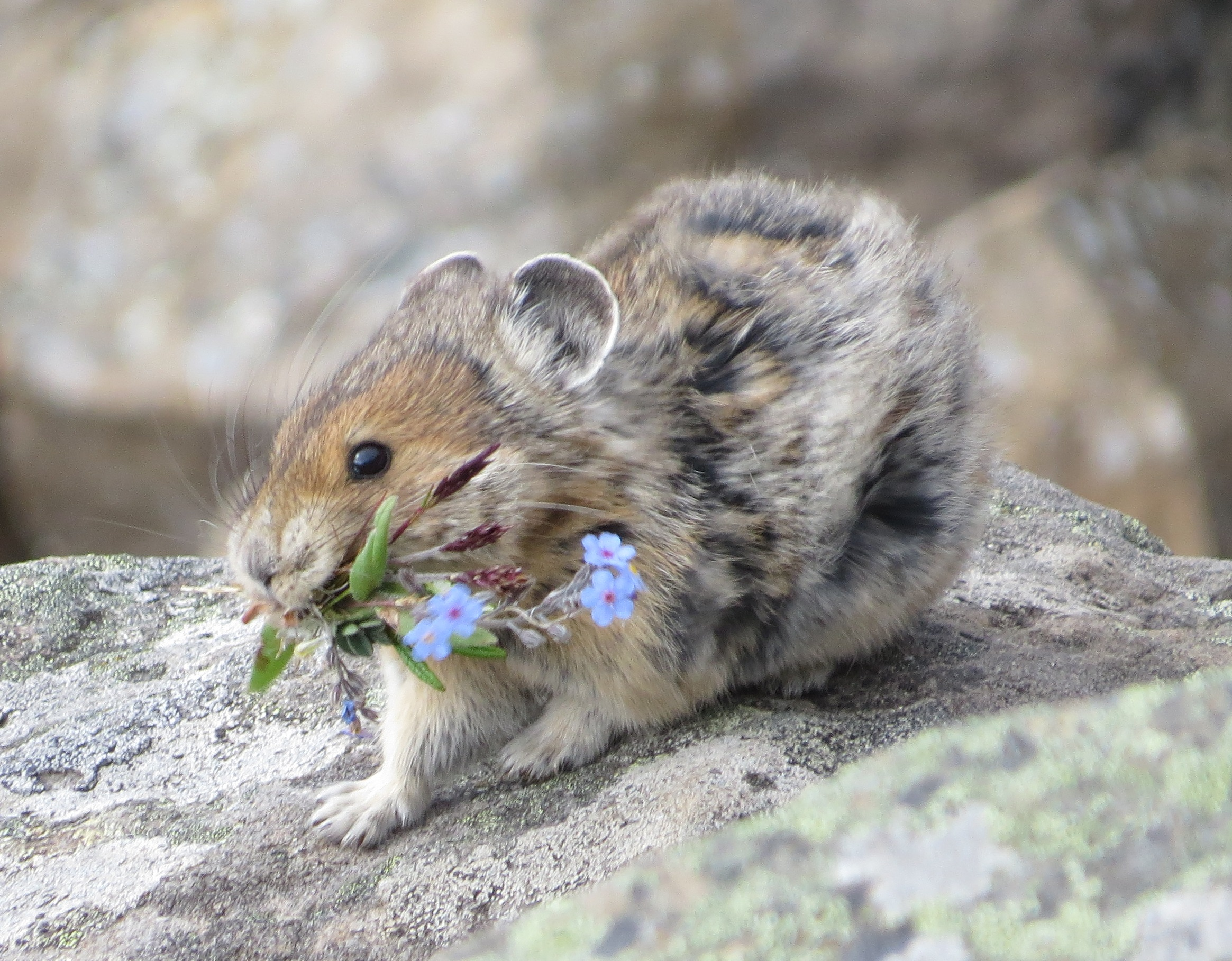
- A living Ochotona, or pika
  Ochotona
  - †Ochotona spanglei – type locality for species
- Ocotea
- Olar
- †Oligobunis
- Olivella
  - †Olivella biplicata
  - †Olivella pedroana
- Ondatra
- Opalia
- †Oreodontoides
- †Osbornodon
- †Osmunda
- Ostrea
  - †Ostrea lurida – or unidentified comparable form
- Ostrya
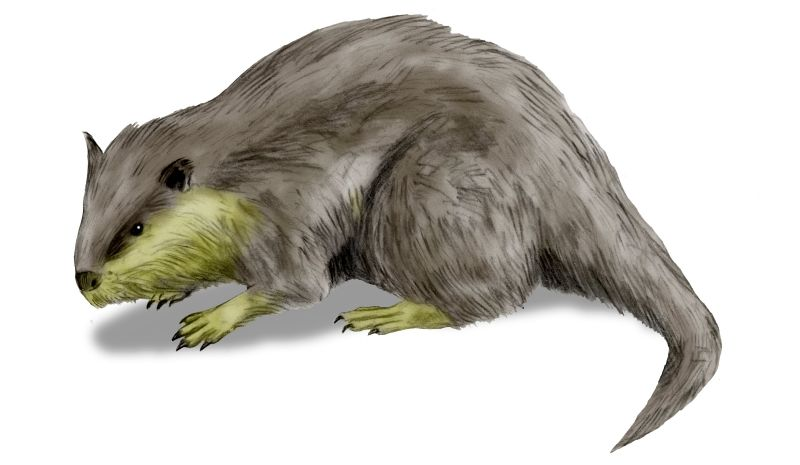
- Life restoration of the Oligocene-Miocene beaver Palaeocastor
  †Palaeocastor
- †Palaeolagus
- †Paleopanax
  - †Paleopanax oregonensis
- Paliurus
- Pandora
- Panopea
  - †Panopea abrupta
- Panthera
  - †Panthera onca – or unidentified comparable form
- †Paradaphoenus
- †Paraenhydrocyon
  - †Paraenhydrocyon josephi
- †Parahippus
  - †Parahippus leonensis – or unidentified related form
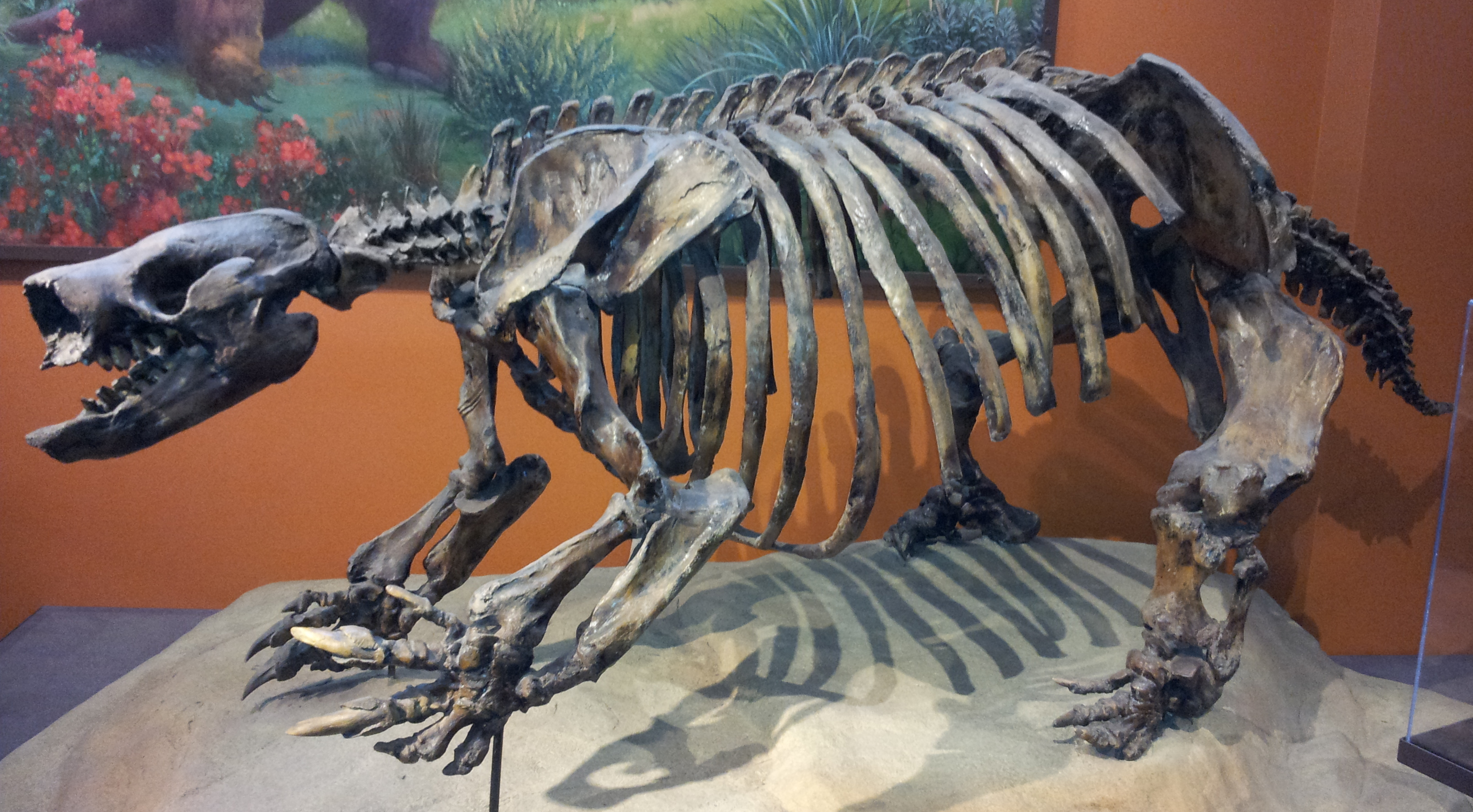
- Fossilized skeleton of the Pliocene-Pleistocene ground sloth Paramylodon
  †Paramylodon
  - †Paramylodon harlani
- †Paratomarctus
- †Paratylopus
- †Paronychomys
- †Paroreodon
- †Parrotia
- †Parthenocissus
- Passalus
- †Patriofelis
  - †Patriofelis ferox
- Pekania
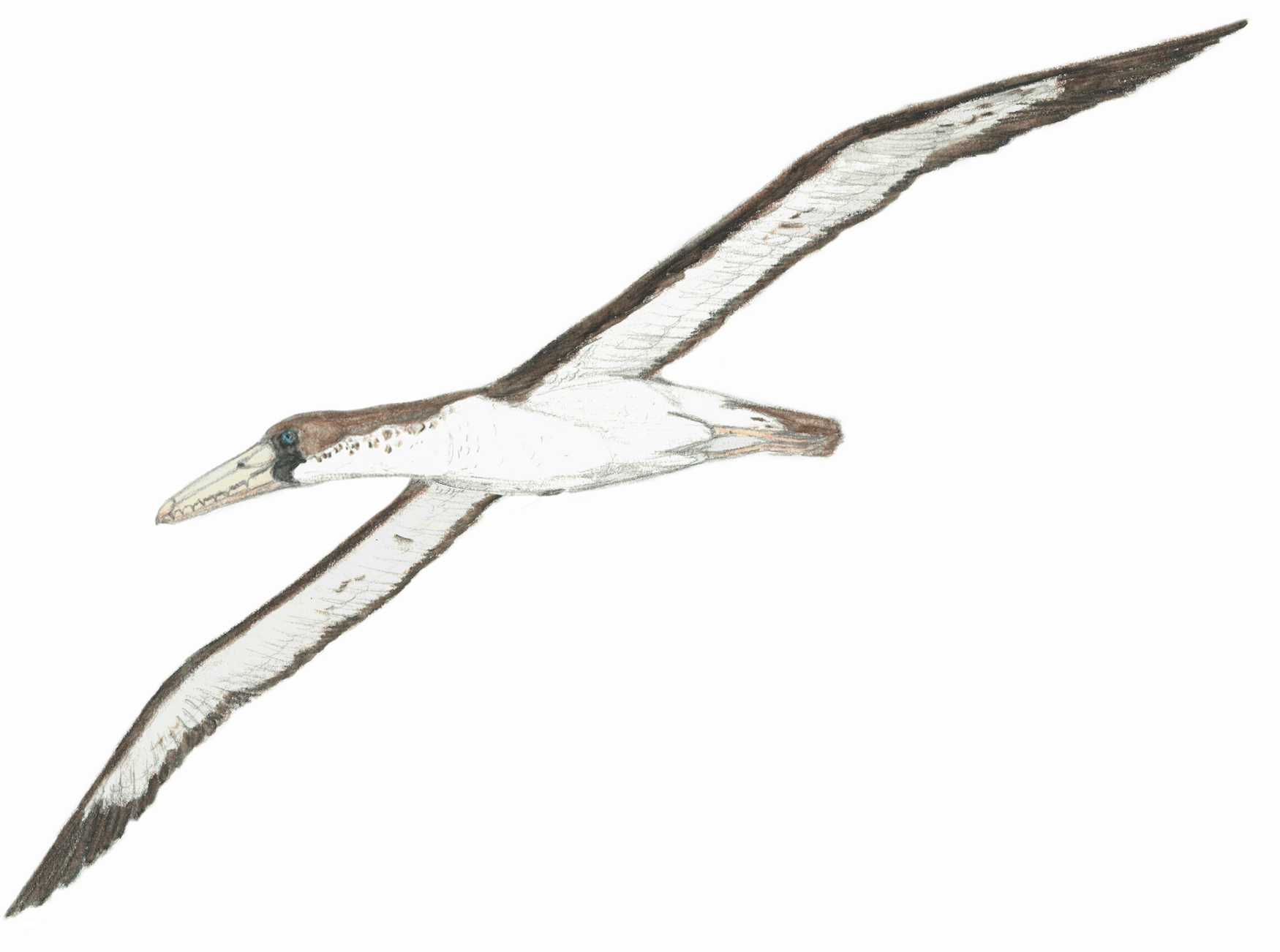
- Life restoration of the Oligocene-Pleistocene false-toothed bird Pelagornis
  †Pelagornis
- Pelecanus
  - †Pelecanus erythrorhynchos
  - †Pelecanus erythrorhynchus – tentative report
- Perognathus
- Peromyscus
- †Perse
- Phalacrocorax
  - †Phalacrocorax auritus – tentative report
- Phalaropus
  - †Phalaropus lobatus
- Phalium
- Phanerolepida
- †Philotrox
  - †Philotrox condoni
- †Phlaocyon
  - †Phlaocyon latidens
- Phoca
  - †Phoca vitulina – or unidentified comparable form
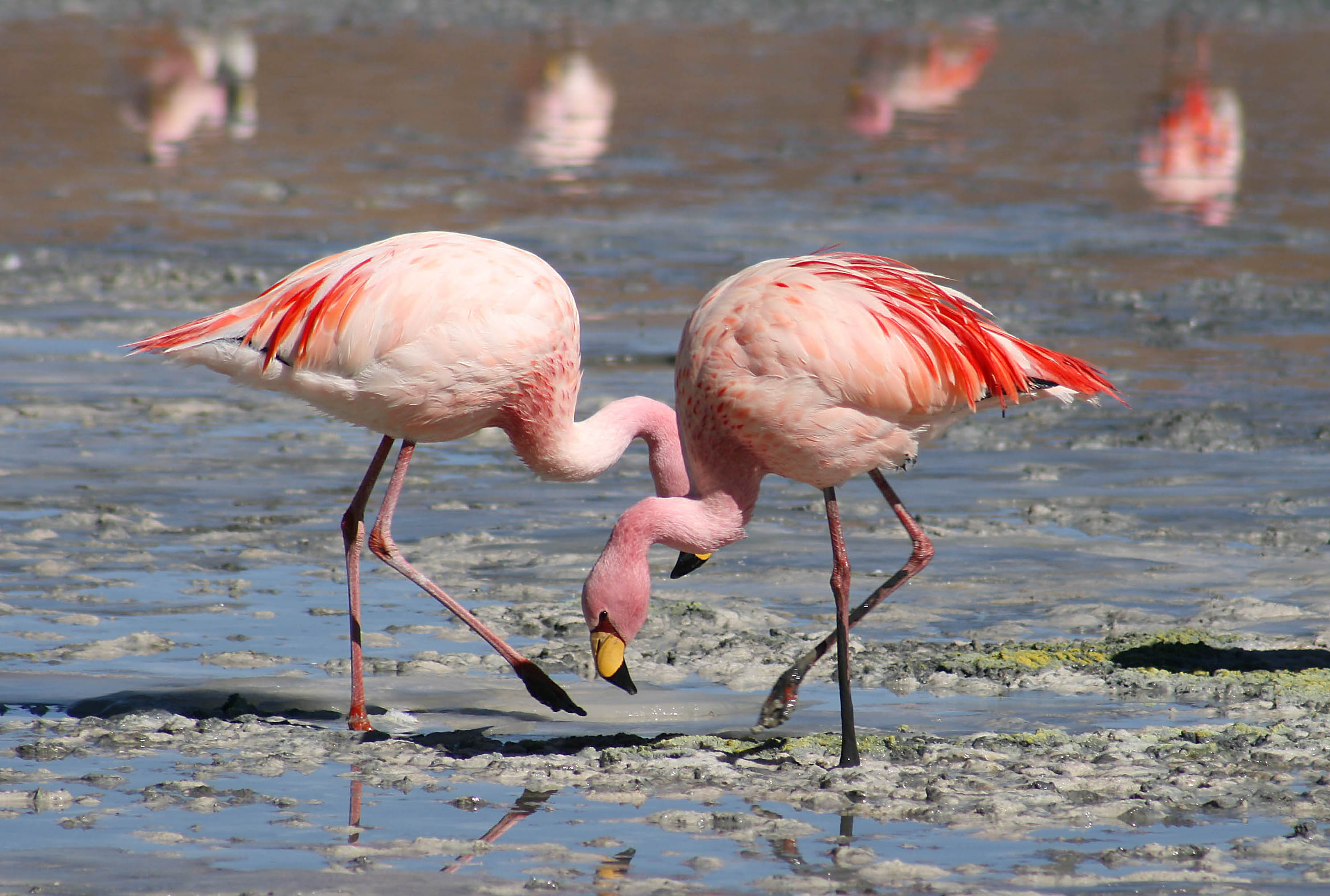
- Two Phoenicopterus, or flamingos
  Phoenicopterus
  - †Phoenicopterus copei – type locality for species
- Pinus
- Pitar
- †Plagiolophus
- Platanus
- †Platygonus
- †Pleiolama
- †Plesiocolopirus
- †Plesiogulo
- †Pliocyon – or unidentified comparable form
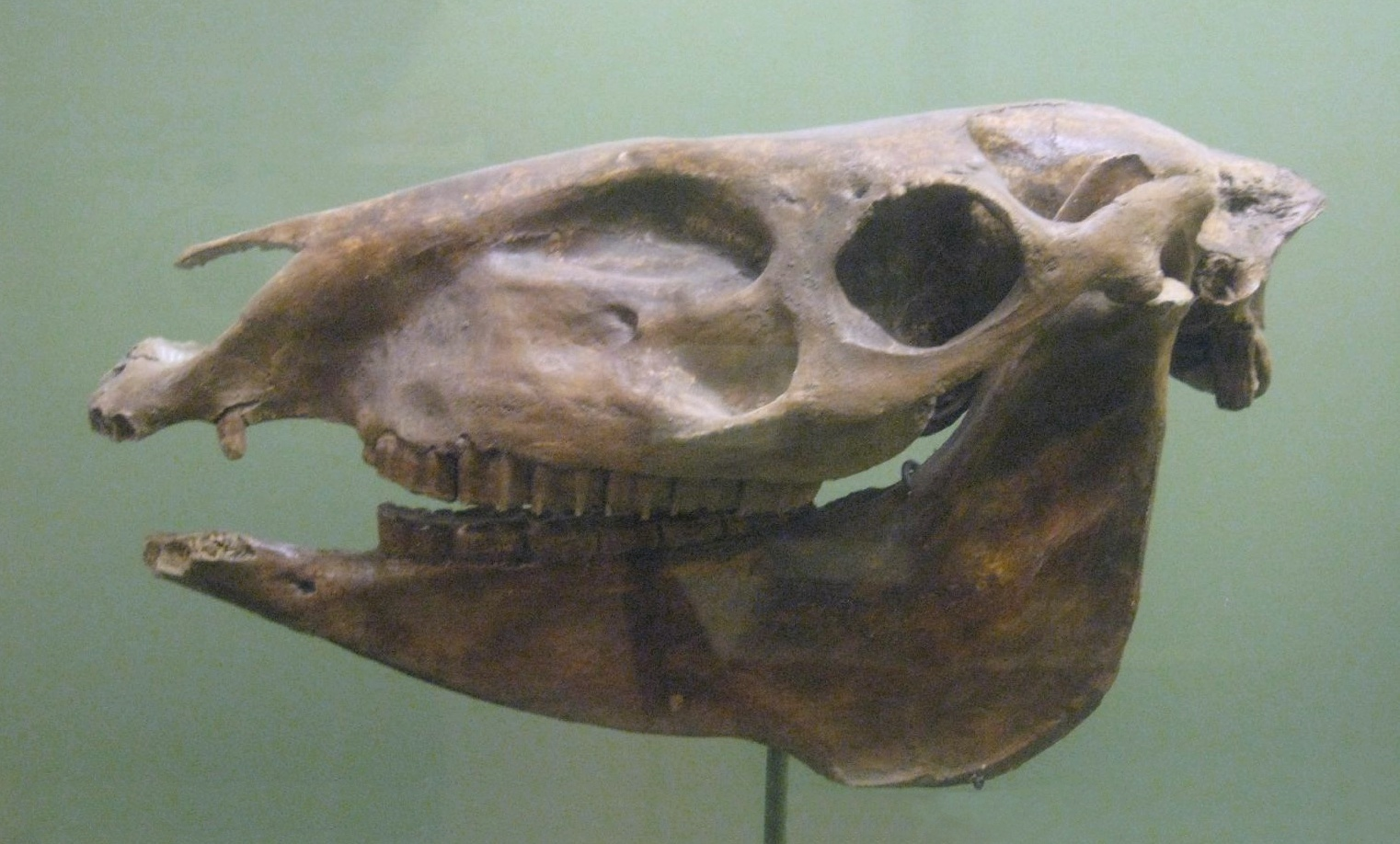
- Fossilized skull of the Miocene horse Pliohippus
  †Pliohippus
- †Plionarctos
- Podiceps
  - †Podiceps auritus – tentative report
- Podilymbus
  - †Podilymbus podiceps
  - †Pododesmus macrochisma
- †Pogonodon
- Polinices
- †Polypodium – or unidentified comparable form
- †Pontolis – type locality for genus
  - †Pontolis magnus – type locality for species
- †Potamogeton
- †Pristichampsus
- †Procamelus
- †Promartes – or unidentified comparable form
- †Promerycochoerus
- Propeamussium
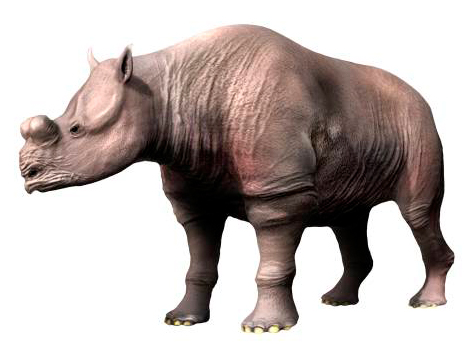
- Life restoration of the Eocene brontothere mammal Protitanops
  †Protitanops
- †Protolabis – or unidentified comparable form
- Protothaca
- Prunus
- †Psephophorus – tentative report
- †Pseudaelurus
- †Pseudotsuga
- Pteris
- Pterocarya
- †Pteronarctos – type locality for genus
- Puncturella
  - †Puncturella galeata
- Purpura
- Pyramidella – tentative report
- Pyrenacantha
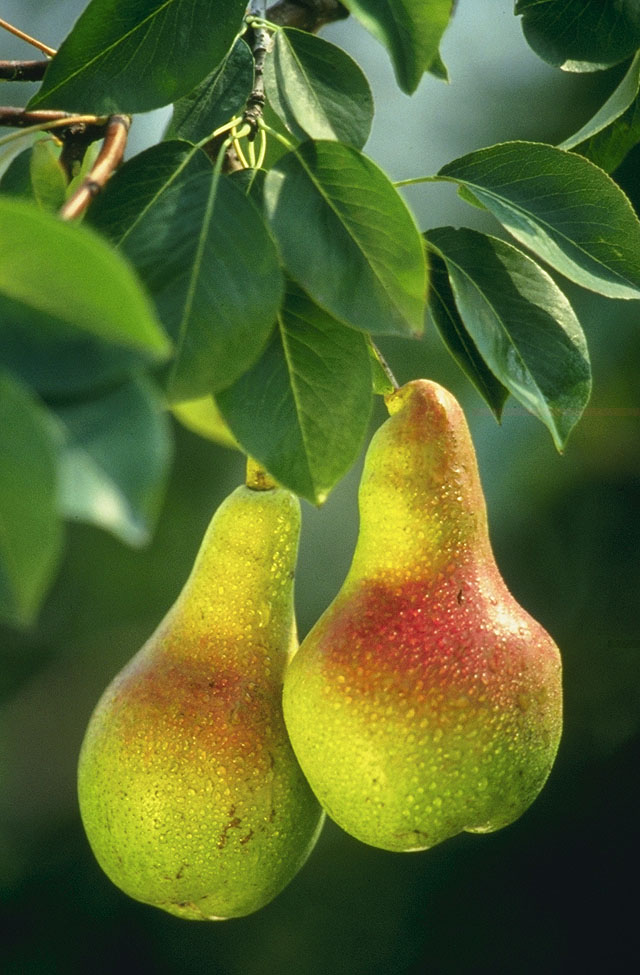
- Fruit of a living Pyrus, or pear tree
  †Pyrus
- Quercus
- Querquedula
- Raja
- Rallus
  - †Rallus limicola
- Recurvirostra
  - †Recurvirostra americana
- Retusa
- Rhabdus
- †Rhizocyon
- Rhus
  - †Rhus rooseae
- †Ribes
- Rimella
- Rosa
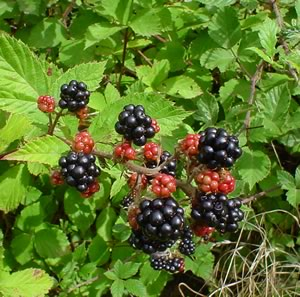
- A living member of Rubus, the genus including blackberries (pictured) and raspberries
  Rubus
- Sabal
- †Sabia
- Salix
- Sanguinolaria
- Sassia
- Saxidomus
  - †Saxidomus gigantea
- Scapanus
  - †Scapanus latimanus
- Scaphander
- †Schisandra
- Schizaster
- Sciurus
- †Scutella
- Semele
- Sequoia
  - †Sequoia affinis
- Siliqua
  - †Siliqua patula
- †Simocetus – type locality for genus
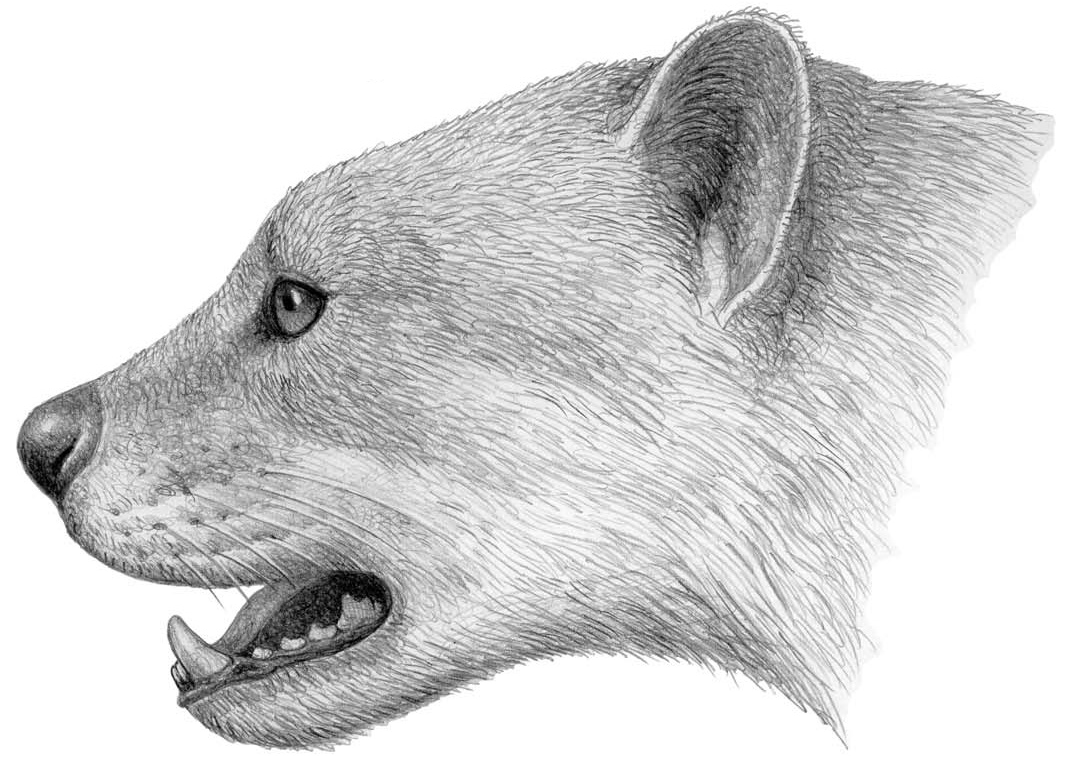
- Reconstruction of a fossilized skull and restorative portrait of the Miocene-Pliocene red panda relative Simocyon
  †Simocyon
- Sinum
- Solariella
- Solemya
- Solen
- †Somatochlora
- Spermophilus
- Spirotropis
- Spisula
- Spizaetus
- †Steneofiber
- Stercorarius
- Sterna
  - †Sterna elegans – tentative report
  - †Sterna forsteri
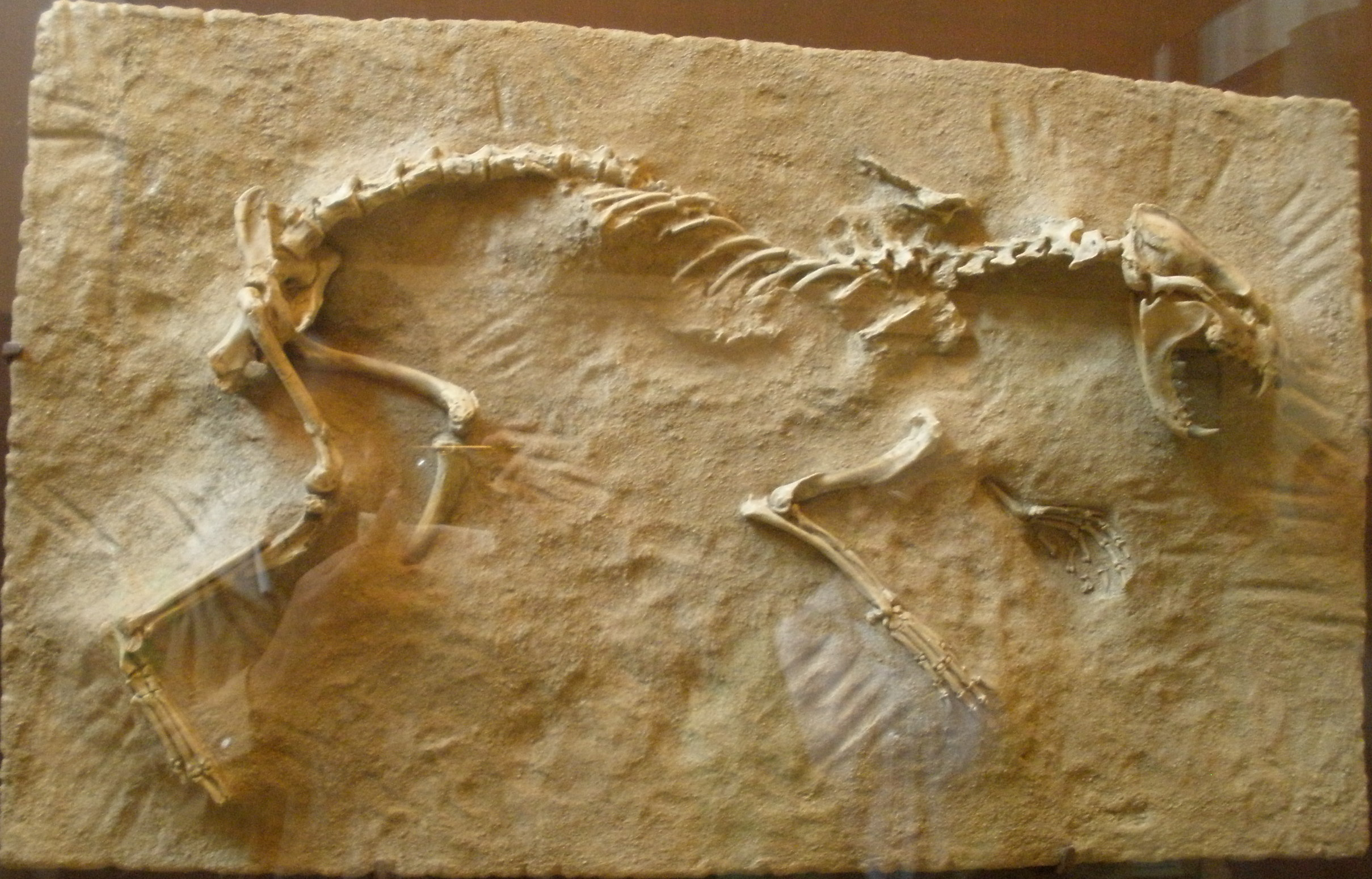
- Fossilized skeleton of the Miocene weasel Sthenictis
  Sthenictis
- Strongylocentrotus
- Sturnella
- †Suavodrillia
- †Subhyracodon
- Sveltella
- Symplocos
- Tapirus
  - †Tapirus californicus – or unidentified comparable form
- Tapiscia
- Taranis
- Taxidea
- †Taxus
  - †Taxus masonii
- Tegula
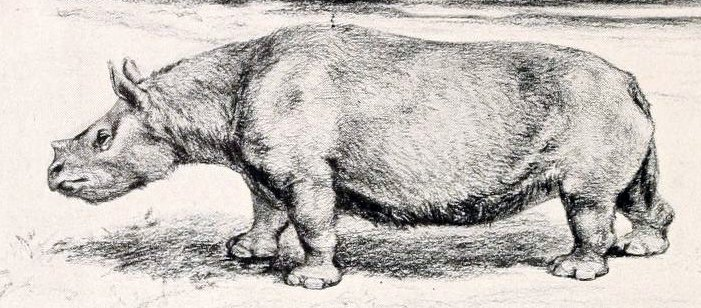
- Restoration of the Miocene-Pliocene rhinoceros Teleoceras
  †Teleoceras
- Tellina
- †Temnocyon
- †Tephrocyon
- Terminalia
- †Tetraclinis
- Thais
- Thesbia – report made of unidentified related form or using admittedly obsolete nomenclature
- Thomomys
  - †Thomomys townsendii
- Thracia
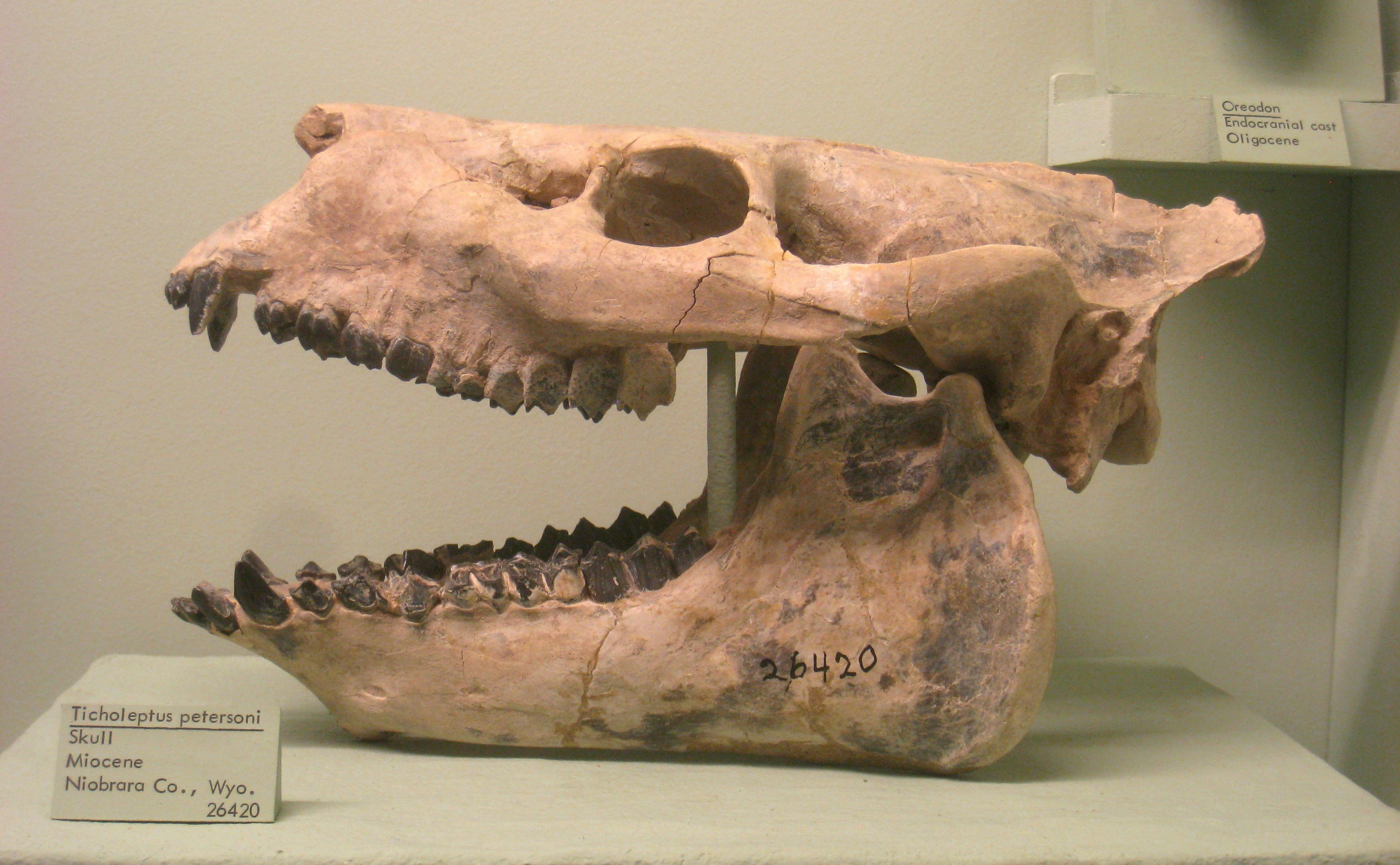
- Fossilized skull of the Miocene oreodont mammal Ticholeptus
  †Ticholeptus
- Tilia
- †Torreya
  - †Torreya clarnensis
- Totanus
- †Toxicodendron
- Trema
- Tresus
- Trichotropis
- Trochita
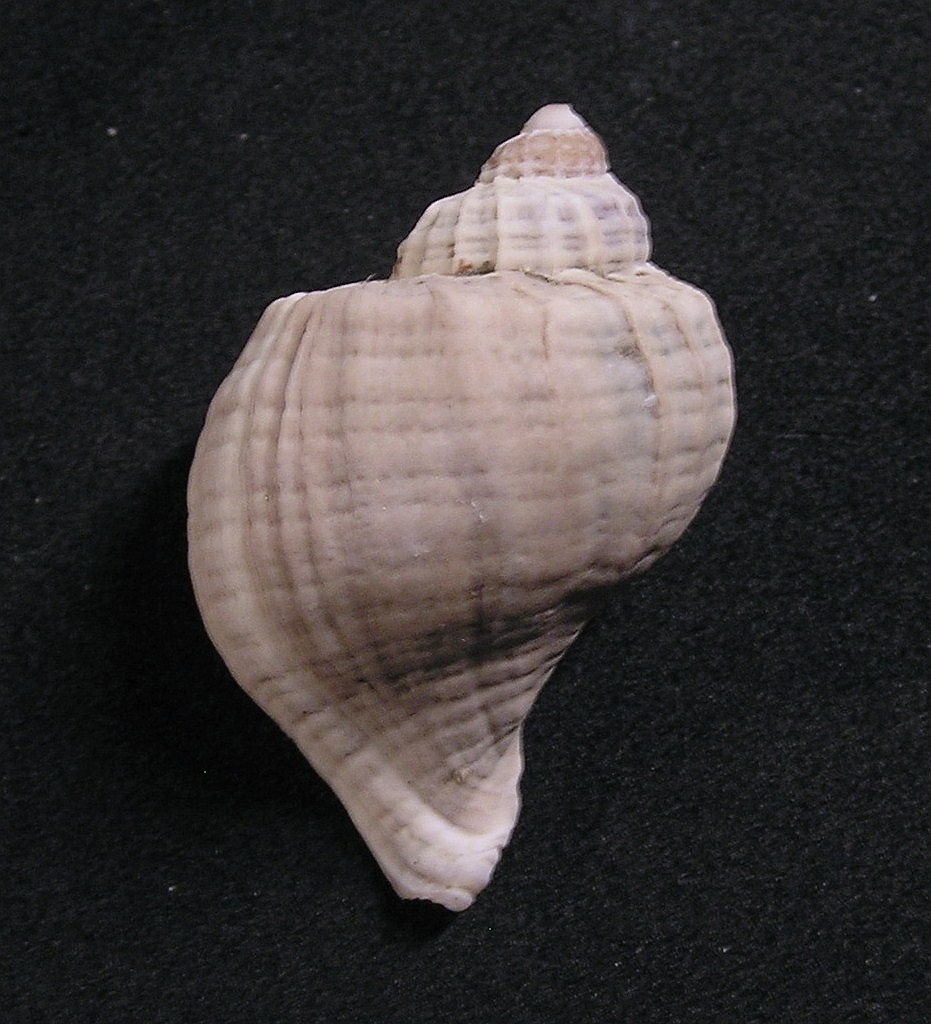
- Shell of a Trophon murex snail
  Trophon
- †Tsuga
- Turricula
- Turris
- Turritella
- †Tylocephalonyx
- Tympanuchus
  - †Tympanuchus pallidicinctus
- Ulmus
- †Ursavus
- Venericardia
- †Viburnum
- Vitis
- Vulpes
- Xema
- Yoldia
  - †Yoldia cooperii – or unidentified comparable form
- Zalophus
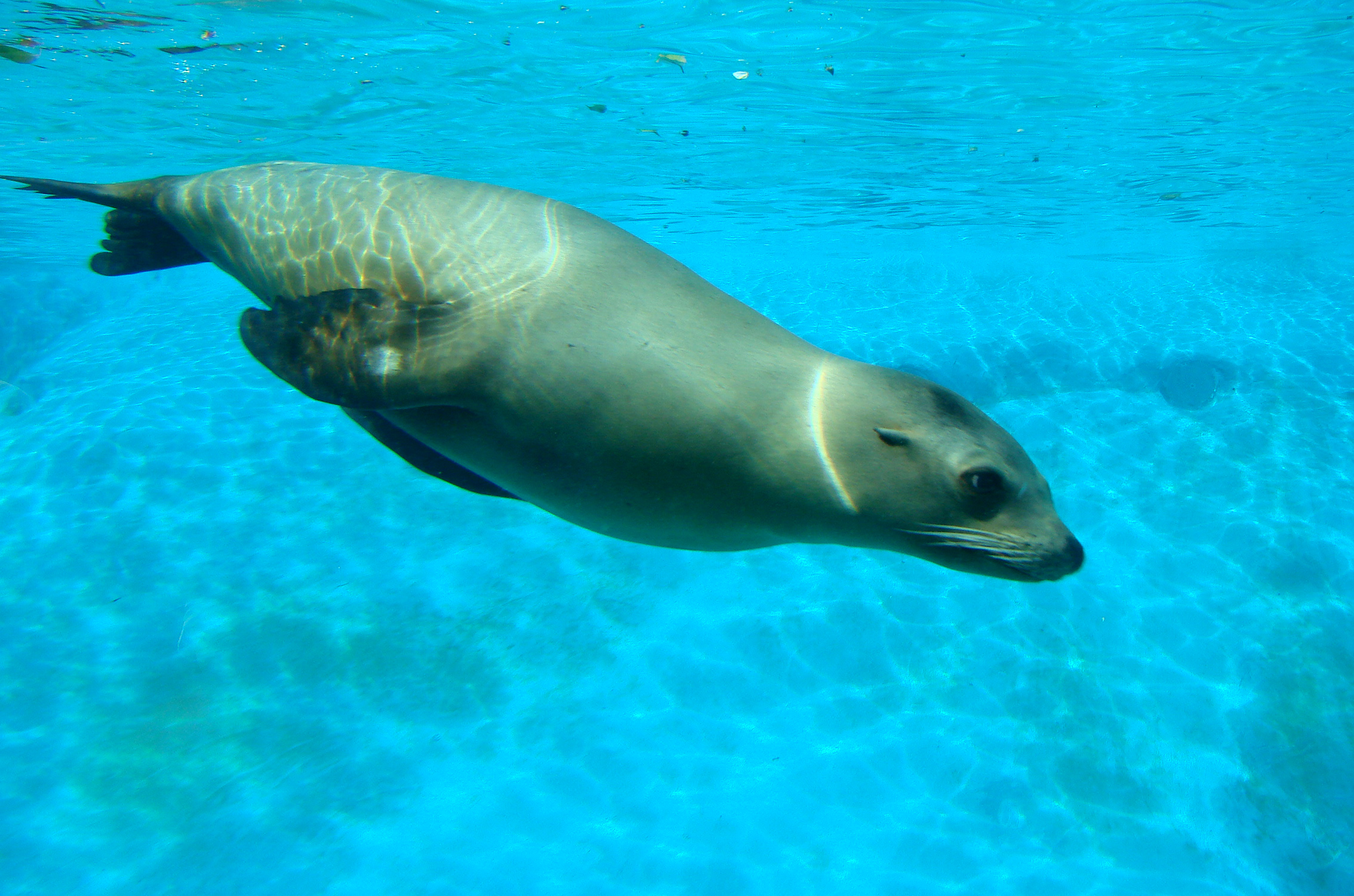
  - A living Zalophus californianus, or California sea lion
    †Zalophus californianus
- Zelkova
