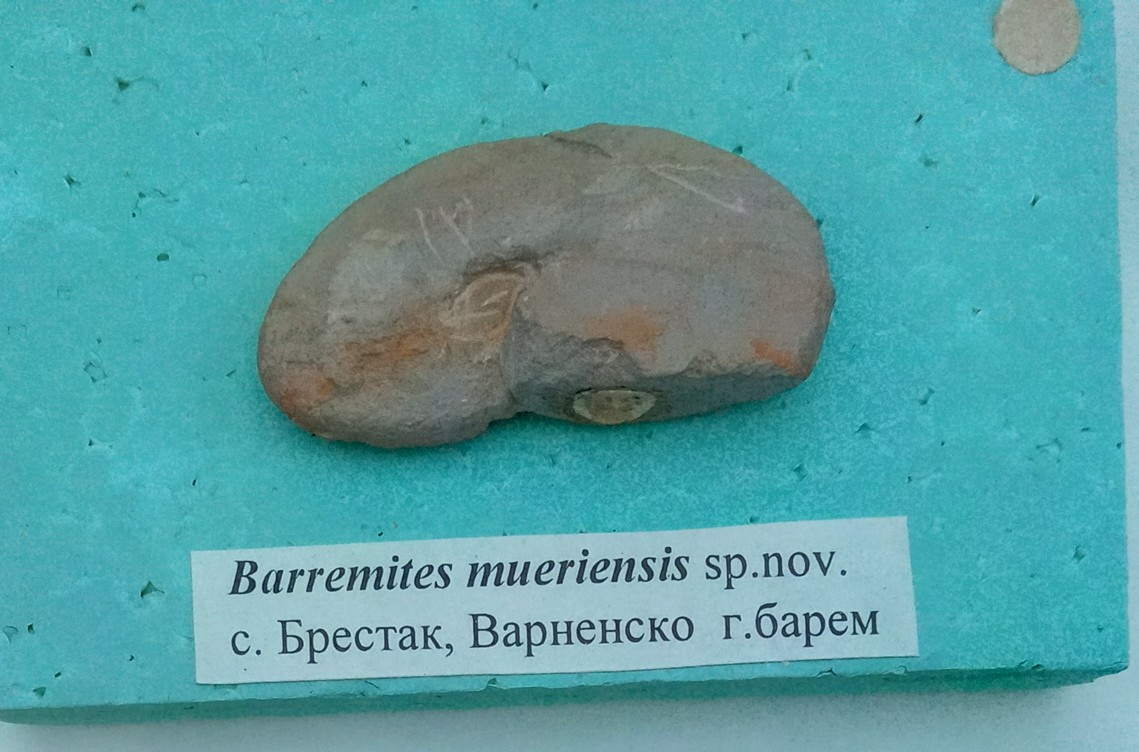
- Barremites moueriensis sp. nov., Upper Barremian, Brestak, Cr1 396X1 (Coll. St. Breskovski) at the Sofia University Museum of Paleontology and Historical Geology

Scientific classification
- Kingdom: Animalia
- Phylum: Mollusca
- Class: Cephalopoda
- Subclass: †Ammonoidea
- Order: †Ammonitida
- Family: †Desmoceratidae
- Subfamily: †Barremitinae
- Genus: †Barremites; Kilian, 1913

Species
- Barremites balkanicus; Barremites difficilis; Barremites primitivus

= Barremites =

Barremites Temporal range: Hauterivian–Barremian

Extinct ammonoid cephalopod genus

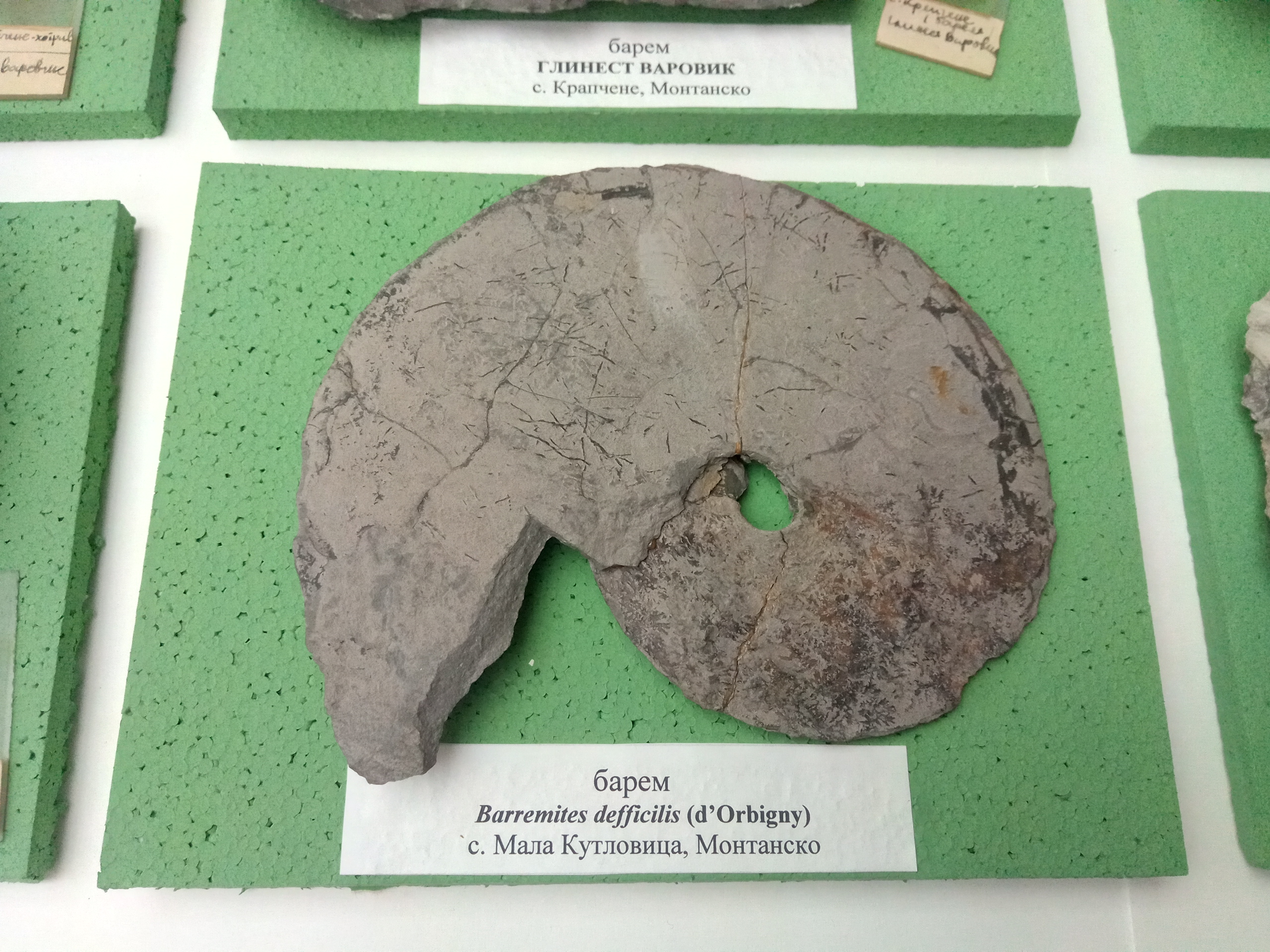
Barremites difficilis (d'Orbigny), Barremian, Mala Koutlovitsa (Montana, Bulgaria) at the SUMPHG

Barremites is an ammonoid cephalopod genus belonging to the family Desmoceratidae, that lived during the Hauterivian and Barremian stages of the Early Cretaceous.

== Description ==
Its shell is moderately to very involute, with the outer whorl strongly embracing the inner whorls, and variably compressed. Sides are generally smooth and marked with sinuous or falcate collars marking intervals of growth and bearing feeble striae to moderately distinguished ribs.

Two subgenera have been defined; Barremites (Raspailiceras) which is moderately involute with a well rounded whorl section and sloping umbilical walls, from the Hauterivian and Barremian, and Barremites (Barremites) which is very involute, compressed, high whorled, with a steep umbilical wall bordered by a sharp edge, from the Barremian.

Barremites has a wide distribution and has been found throughout Europe, in the Republic of Georgia, Morocco, Mexico, Columbia, and Japan.

== Distribution ==
Cretaceous of Austria, Bulgaria, Czech Republic, France, Hungary, Italy, Japan, Morocco, Slovakia, Spain, Trinidad and Tobago and the former USSR.

== Bibliography ==
- Wright C.W. with J.H. Callomon and M.K. Howarth (1996). "Mollusca 4 Revised: Cretaceous Ammonoidea". In Roger L. Kaesler (ed.). Treatise on Invertebrate Paleontology Part L. Vol. 4. Boulder, Colorado and Lawrence, Kansas: The Geological Society of America & University of Kansas Press. p. 69 – via Internet Archive.
- Arkell, W. J.; Furnish, W. M.; Kummel, Bernhard; Miller, A.K.; Moore, R.C.; Schindewolf, O.H. (1957). "Part L, Mollusca 4: Cephalopoda, Ammonoidea". In Raymond C. Moore (ed.). Treatise on Invertebrate Paleontology. Geological Society of America and University of Kansas Press. p. L362. ISBN 978-0-8137-3012-7 – via Internet Archive.
