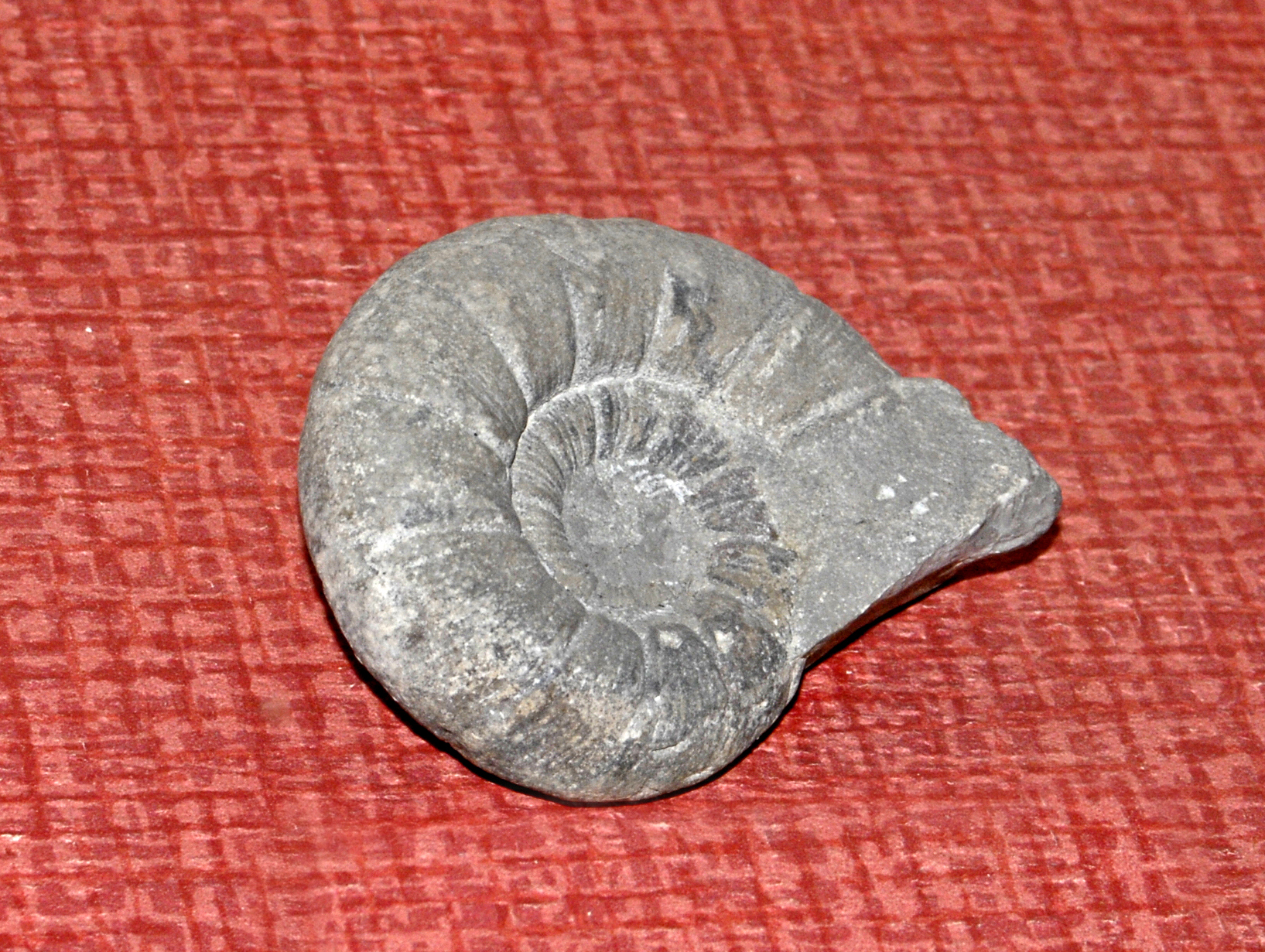
- Fossil shell of Spitidiscus species from Alpes-de-Haute-Provence, on display at Galerie de paléontologie et d'anatomie comparée in Paris

Scientific classification
- Kingdom: Animalia
- Phylum: Mollusca
- Class: Cephalopoda
- Subclass: †Ammonoidea
- Order: †Ammonitida
- Family: †Holcodiscidae
- Genus: †Spitidiscus; Kilian, 1910

= Spitidiscus =

Spitidiscus Temporal range: Hauterivian-Barremian ~130–125 Ma

Genus of molluscs (fossil)

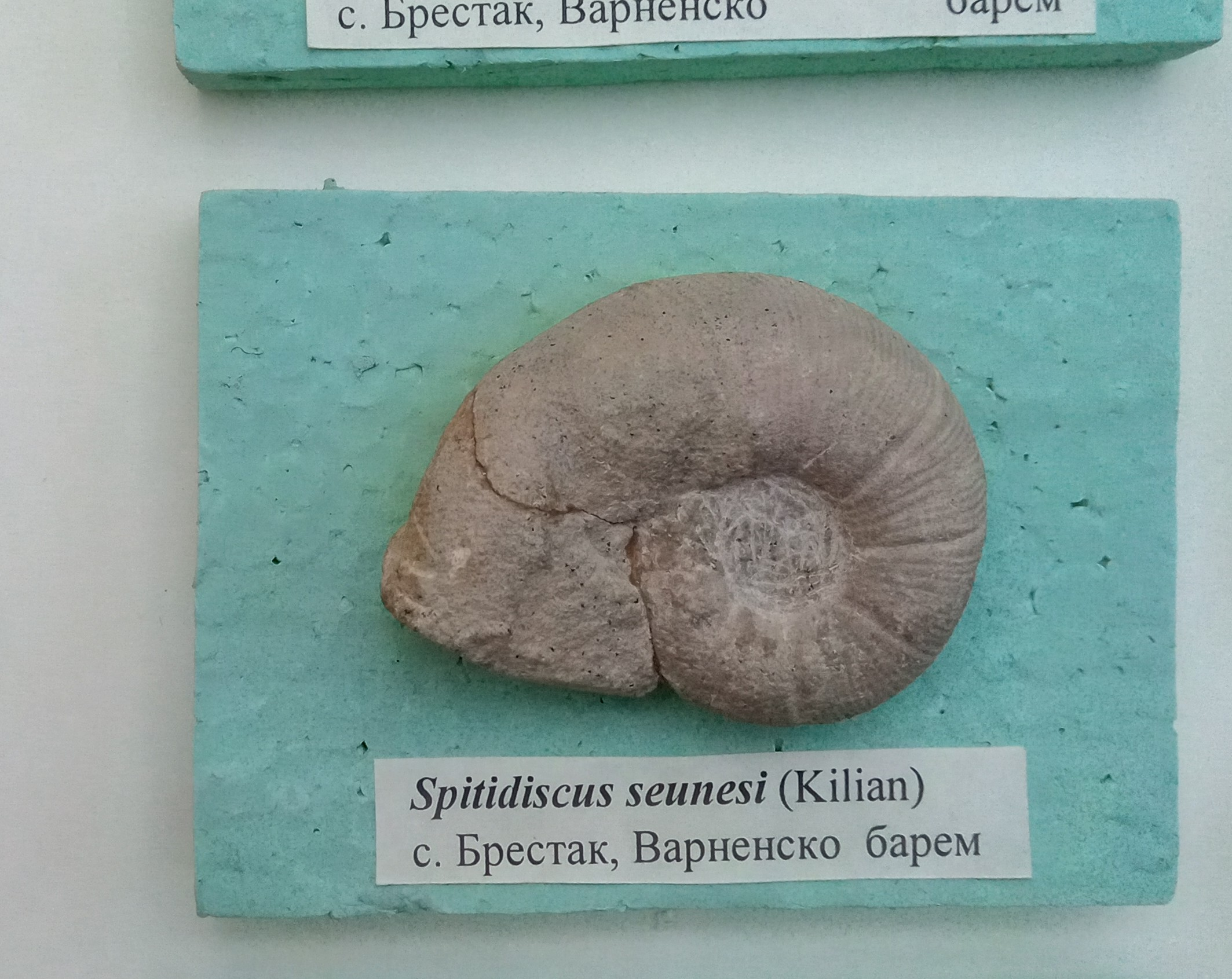
Spitidiscus seunesi (Kilian) Barremian, Brestak, Cr1 426X1 (Coll. St. Breskovski) at the Sofia University Museum of Paleontology and Historical Geology

Spitidiscus is a genus of ammonites placed in the family Holcodiscidae.

== Species ==
List of species within Spitidiscus:

- Spitidiscus hugii
- Spitidiscus kilapiae Rawson and Aguirre-Urreta, 2012 - Argentina
- Spitidiscus oregonensis Imlay, 1960 - Oregon
- Spitidiscus riccardii Leanza, and Wiedmann, 1992 - Argentina
- Spitidiscus rotulia - England
- Spitidiscus simitiensis Haas, 1960 - Colombia
- Spitidiscus vandeckii (d'Orbigny, 1847)

== Description ==
Member species have a rather evolute shell in which the whorl section is more or less circular, venter broadly rounded and dorsum fairly deeply impressed. Close, fine low, single or rarely branching ribs are interspersed by frequent straight or slightly sinuous, moderately deep but wide constrictions. The type species S. rotulia is from the Hauterivian of England.

== Biostratigraphic significance ==
The first appearance of the species Spitidiscus hugii or Spitidiscus vandeckii are proposed to be the marker for the beginning of the Barremian.

== Distribution ==
Spitidiscus has been found in:

- Agrio Formation, Argentina
- Magdalena Valley, Simití and Cáqueza, Colombia
- Kaliste Formation, Czech Republic
- France
- Gagra, Georgia, Caucasus
- Maiolica Formation, Italy
- Subbetics, Spain
- Foggy Creek, Oregon
- Bulgaria
- Portugal
- Russia
- Morocco
- Mexico

== Bibliography ==
- "Spidiscus". Paleobiology Database.
- "Spidiscus". Encyclopedia of Life (EOL).
- Wright, Claud William; with John Hannes Callomon and M.K. Howarth (1996). Roger L. Kaesler (ed.). Mollusca 4 Revised, Cretaceous Ammonoidea in Treatise on Invertebrate Paleontology Part L. Boulder, Colorado and Lawrence, Kansas: The Geological Society of America & University of Kansas Press. p. 69.
- Arkell, W. J.; Furnish, W. M.; Kummel, Bernhard; Miller, A.K.; Moore, R.C.; Schindewolf, O.H. (1957). "Part L, Mollusca 4: Cephalopoda, Ammonoidea". In Raymond C. Moore (ed.). Treatise on Invertebrate Paleontology. Geological Society of America and University of Kansas Press. p. L371. ISBN 978-0-8137-3012-7 – via Internet Archive.
