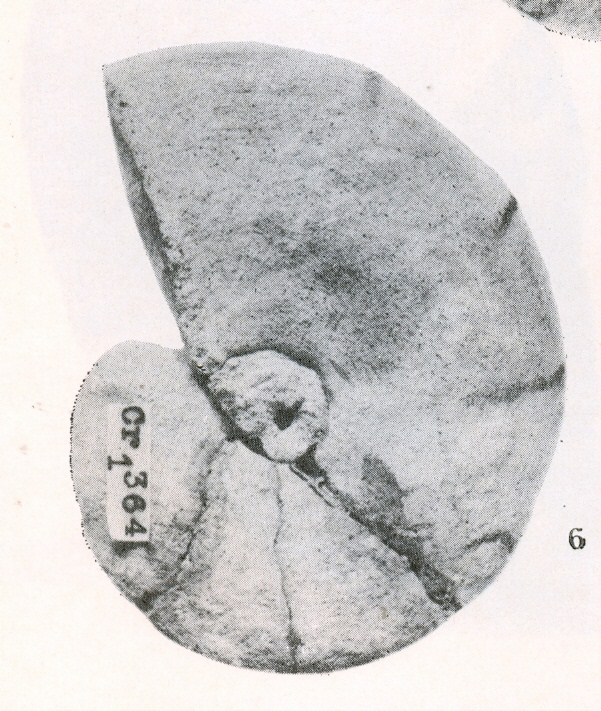
- Barremites difficilis hemiptychus, Kilian, 1913 found in Brestak, Varna (region), on display at the Sofia University Museum of Paleontology and Historical Geology, Bulgaria

Scientific classification
- Kingdom: Animalia
- Phylum: Mollusca
- Class: Cephalopoda
- Subclass: †Ammonoidea
- Order: †Ammonitida
- Family: †Desmoceratidae
- Subfamily: †Barremitinae; Breskovski, 1977

Genera
- Barremites

= Barremitinae =

Barremitinae Temporal range: Valanginian–Barremian

Extinct Ammonoidea family

Barremitinae is a subfamily belonging to the Ammonoidea subclass.

== Description ==
Whorl section in this group ranges from more or less circular through rectangular to oxyconic. Ribbing, if present, is weak. Suture is relatively simple, without markedly retracted suspensive lobe.

This animal lived during the Lower Cretaceous, from Upper Valanginian to Upper Barremian.

== Distribution ==
It has been recorded from Morocco, Spain (Granada, Murcia, Jaén), France (Provence), Italy, Austria, Hungary, Slovakia, Bulgaria, Georgia, Oregon, United States, Trinidad and Tobago, Japan, and Egypt.
