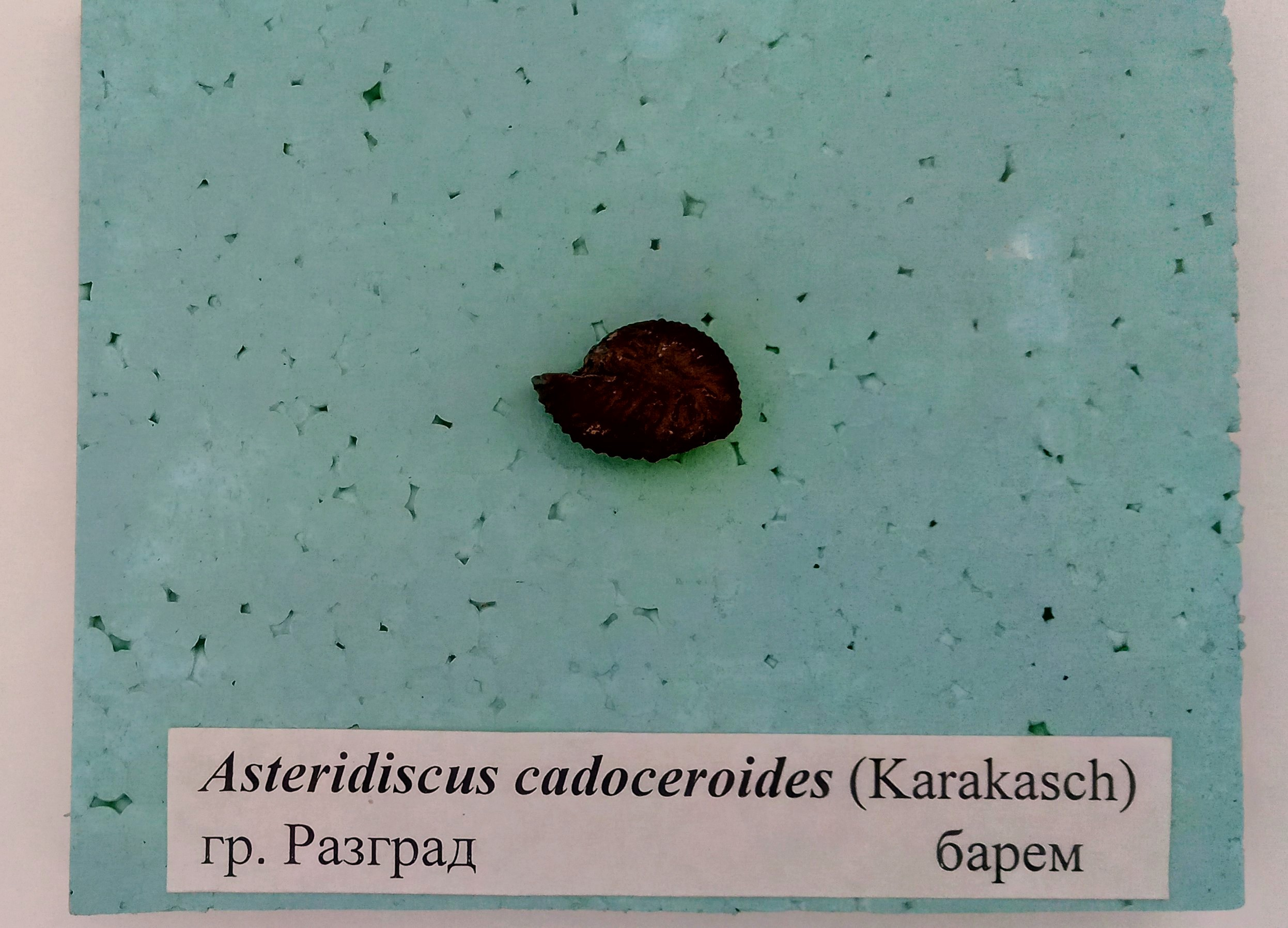
- Astieridiscus cadoceroides (Karakasch) Barremian, Razgrad, (Coll. V. Tzankov) at the Sofia University Museum of Paleontology and Historical Geology

Scientific classification
- Kingdom: Animalia
- Phylum: Mollusca
- Class: Cephalopoda
- Subclass: †Ammonoidea
- Order: †Ammonitida
- Family: †Holcodiscidae
- Genus: †Astieridiscus; Kilian, 1910

= Astieridiscus =

Astieridiscus Temporal range: Barremian

Genus of molluscs (fossil)

Astieridiscus is an extinct lower Cretaceous ammonite. Its shell evolute, covered by dense, simple or branching, slightly flexuous ribs. The sides are slightly flattened, the venter rounded. No umbilical or other tubercles except on innermost whorl. Superficially resembles Olcostephanus.
