= Shovelton =

Shovelton is an English surname. Notable people with the surname include:

- Geoffrey Shovelton (1936–2016), English opera singer and illustrator
- Helena Shovelton (born 1945), British civil servant
- Patrick Shovelton (1919–2012)), British civil servant
