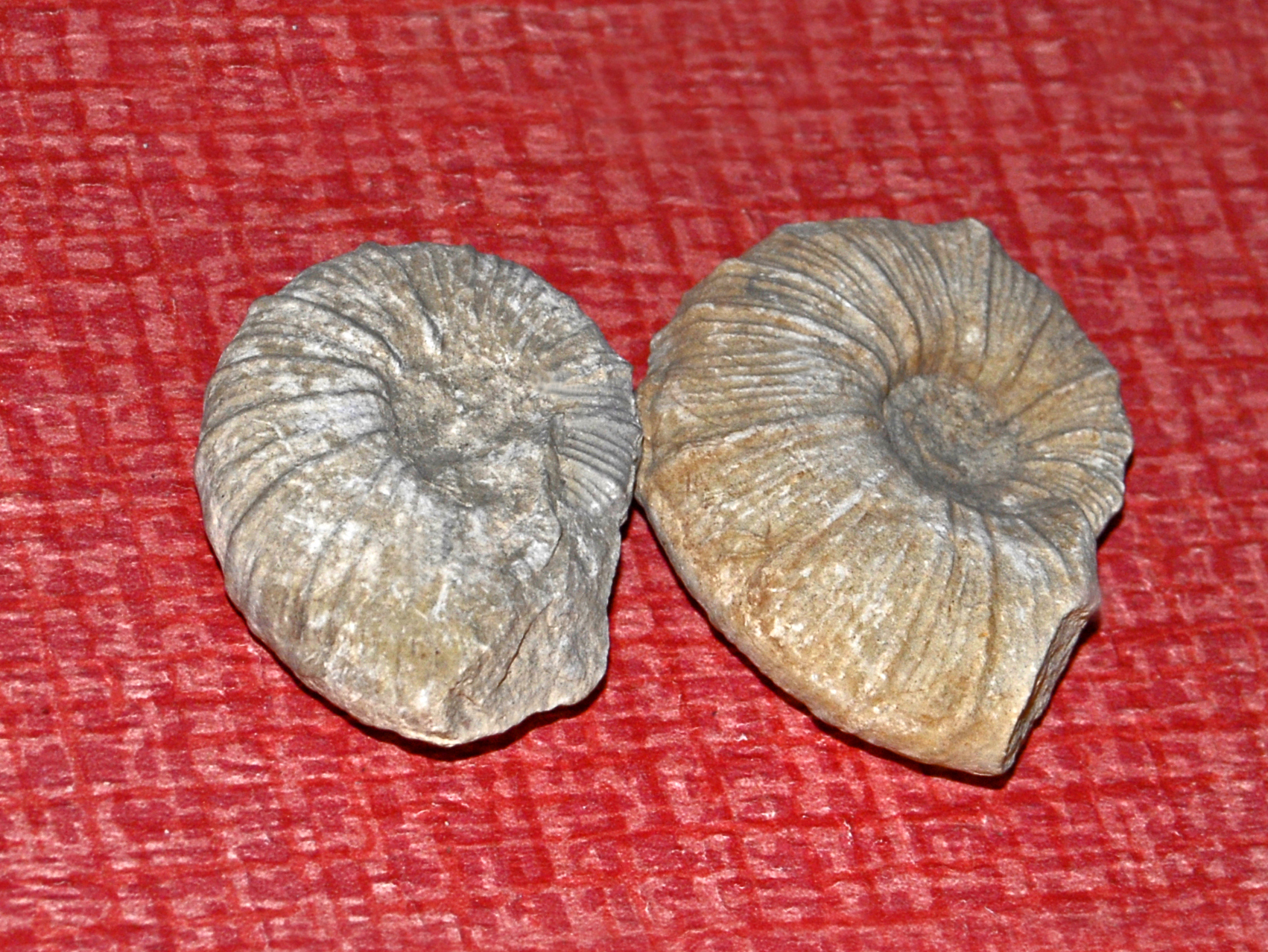
- Fossil shell of Holcodiscus fallax from Alpes-de-Haute-Provence, on display at Galerie de paléontologie et d'anatomie comparée in Paris

Scientific classification
- Kingdom: Animalia
- Phylum: Mollusca
- Class: Cephalopoda
- Subclass: †Ammonoidea
- Order: †Ammonitida
- Family: †Holcodiscidae
- Genus: †Holcodiscus; Uhlig, 1882

= Holcodiscus =

Holcodiscus Temporal range: Cretaceous 130.0–84.9 Ma

Genus of molluscs (fossil)

Holcodiscus is an extinct ammonite genus placed in the family Holcodiscidae. Species in this genus were fast-moving nektonic carnivores. The type species of the genus is Ammonites caillaudianus.

== Description ==
Circular to rectangular whorl section; fine, low, straight or flexuous simple or branched ribs, periodically truncated by thin, high, enlarged ribs bearing lateral and ventrolateral tubercles; inner whorls tending to have depressed whorl section and to resemble Olcostephanus.

== Species ==
- Holcodiscus caillaudianus d'Orbigny 1850
- Holcodiscus camelinus d'Orbigny 1850
- Holcodiscus hauthali Paulcke 1907
- Holcodiscus tenuistriatus Paulcke 1907

== Distribution ==
Fossils of species within this genus have been found in the Cretaceous sediments of Austria, Bulgaria, Chile, Colombia, Czech Republic, Slovakia, France, Italy, Morocco, Spain and Russia.

== Gallery ==
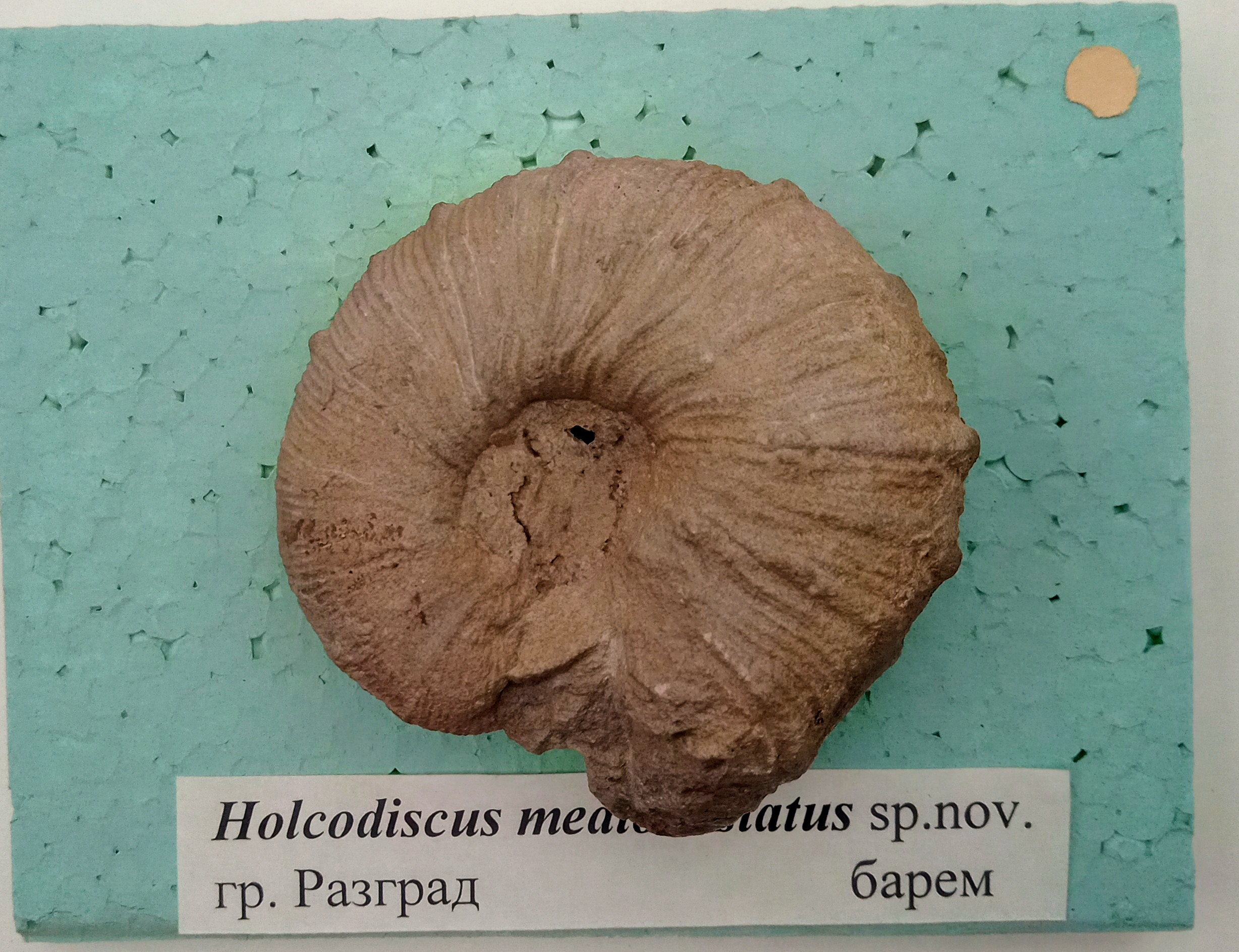
Holcodiscus mediocostatus Tzankov, 1935, Barremian, Razgrad, Cr1 1716 (Coll. V. Tzankov) at the Sofia University Museum of Paleontology and Historical Geology
