= Vassil Tzankov =

Vassil Tzankov Tzankov
- Васил Цанков Цанков
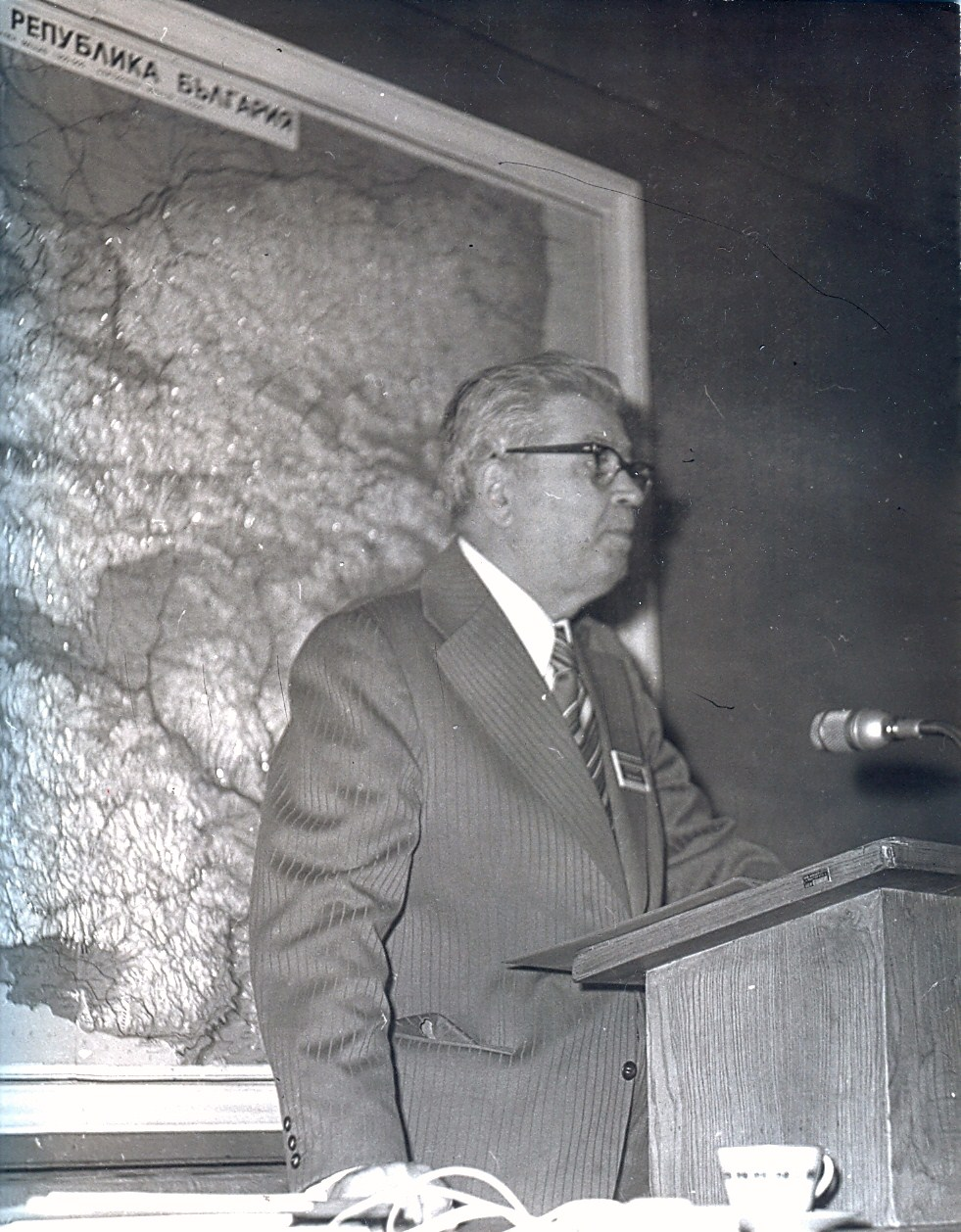
- Born: 2 April 1905 O.S. Gorna Oryahovitsa, Principality of Bulgaria
- Died: 25 August 1986 (aged 81); Sofia, People's Republic of Bulgaria
- Resting place: Central Sofia Cemetery; 42°42.803′N 23°20.193′E
- Citizenship: Bulgaria
- Education: Sofia University "St. Kliment Ohridski"
- Known for: "Fossils of Bulgaria" (Bulgarian: Фосилите на България)
- Spouse: Kincha Tzankova (Maltcheva) (1907-2002)
- Parents: Tzanko Tzankov (1869-1941) (father); Anna Tzankova (1876-1966) (mother)
- Scientific career
- Fields: Paleontology, Stratigraphy
- Workplaces: Sofia University; University of Vienna; University of Paris; University of Berlin; Bulgarian Ministry of Trade, Industry and Labour; Bulgarian Academy of Sciences
- Thesis: Геология на Шуменското плоскогорие и близките му околности, дисертация представена на Физико-математическия факултет на университета в София за добиване на титлата доктор по естествените науки от Васил Цанков от Горна Оряховица (An Essay on Geology of the Shumen Plateau and Its Near Vicinities) (1930)
- Doctoral advisor: Stephan Bonchev
- Doctoral students: Stoycho V. Breskovski
- Author abbrev. (zoology): Tzankov

Vassil Tzankov Tzankov (Bulgarian: Васил Цанков Цанков) (15 April [O.S. 2 April] 1905, Gorna Oryahovitsa, Bulgaria – August 25, 1986, Sofia, Bulgaria) was a Bulgarian geologist and paleontologist. He is best known for his work on Upper Cretaceous ammonites and bivalves. Tzankov was head of Bulgarian Geological Survey from 1941 until 1944. In 1945 he became docent and in 1947 - professor, and was appointed to the paleontology chair at Sofia University "St. Kliment Ohridski". In the late 1950s Tzankov organized the launch and became the first editor and one of the principal authors of the multi-volume treatise "Fossils of Bulgaria" (Bulgarian: Фосилите на България). Contributors to the treatise included leading Bulgarian specialists in the field. He served as deputy director of the Geological Institute at the Committee for Geology and Mineral Resources in the period 1960-1966. From 1967 to 1982 Tzankov also served as head of the Department of Paleontology with the Geological Institute at the Bulgarian Academy of Sciences. In 1967 he was elected as a corresponding member of the Bulgarian Academy of Sciences.

== Early life ==
Tzankov was raised in Shumen in the family of a veterinary physician, Dr. Tzanko Tzankov (1869-1941). After attending high school in Shumen, he enrolled in Sofia University, taking his undergraduate degree in natural history in 1929. He took his PhD in 1929, under the supervision of Dr. Stephan Bonchev and became the first student to be awarded a doctorate in natural science in Bulgaria. His dissertation was regional paleontological survey of Shumen plateau, and in particular, stratigraphy and paleontology of the Upper Cretaceous fossils in Northeastern Bulgaria.

== Early career ==
Tzankov commenced work as an assistant professor in geology at Sofia University in 1930. He did postgraduate research in Vienna (1936), Paris (1938–39) and Berlin (1941). In 1939, he was appointed chief of the Geology section at the Ministry of Trade, Industry and Labour. In 1941, he was appointed head of Geology Research within the newly established directorate “Natural Resources”. During that period he introduced micropaleontological research – foraminifera, conodonts, spores and pollen – in Bulgaria. In 1945 he resumed his academic work at Sofia University. In 1947, he was promoted to full professor. He would alternate in his role of director of the Bulgarian Geological Survey for many years, performing double duty as professor for those years.

== Fossils of Bulgaria ==
Beginning in the 1950s, Tzankov drafted a project in which Bulgarian specialists would write on their area of expertise in paleontology as contributions to a multi volume series, which would be published by the Bulgarian Academy of Sciences. Tzankov became editor, and also provided assistance for definition of morphologic terms, as well as other explanations. He supplied the parts to the treatise which concerned his own specialty areas.

== Later career ==
In 1967, Tzankov was elected corresponding member of the Bulgarian Academy of Sciences. In the same year he was also appointed as head of the Department of Paleontology at the Geological Institute of the Bulgarian Academy of Sciences, a position he held until 1982.

== Memberships ==
- Corresponding Member of the Bulgarian Academy of Sciences.
- Honorary Member of the Bulgarian Geological Society.
- Editor – Geologica Balcanica

== Legacy and awards ==
In his later years, Tzankov continued his work on "Fossils of Bulgaria" and on phylogeny of the ammonites Holcodiscidae and Asteridiscidae (together with St. Breskovski). He died in Sofia in 1986. Vassil Tzankov was survived by his wife Kincha, daughter Yana and son Tzanko. He received many awards, including an honorary badge of Sofia University, state order Sts. Cyril and Methodius etc. His collection of fossils is preserved in the Sofia University Museum of Paleontology and Historical Geology (SUMPHG).

== Selected bibliography ==
He is author of more than 100 publications, including 5 textbooks and 3 books.

- Les Fossiles de Bulgarie, Sofia: Éditions de L’Académie Bulgare des Sciences. Publié sous la rédaction de V. Tzankov
- Tzankov, Vassil; Pamouktchiev, A.; Tchechmedjieva, V.; Motekova, N. (1981). Les fossiles de Bulgarie V Crétacé supérieur. Grandes foraminifères, Anthozoaires, Gastéropodes, Bivalvia (in Bulgarian and French). Sofia: Éditions de L'Académie bulgare des sciences. OCLC 31018111 – via Internet Archive.
- Tzankov, Vassil (1982). Les fossiles de Bulgarie Va Crétacé supérieur. Cephalopoda (Nautiloidea, Ammonoidea) et Echinodermata (Echinoidea) (in Bulgarian and French). Sofia: Éditions de L'Académie bulgare des sciences. OCLC 1014711410 – via Internet Archive.

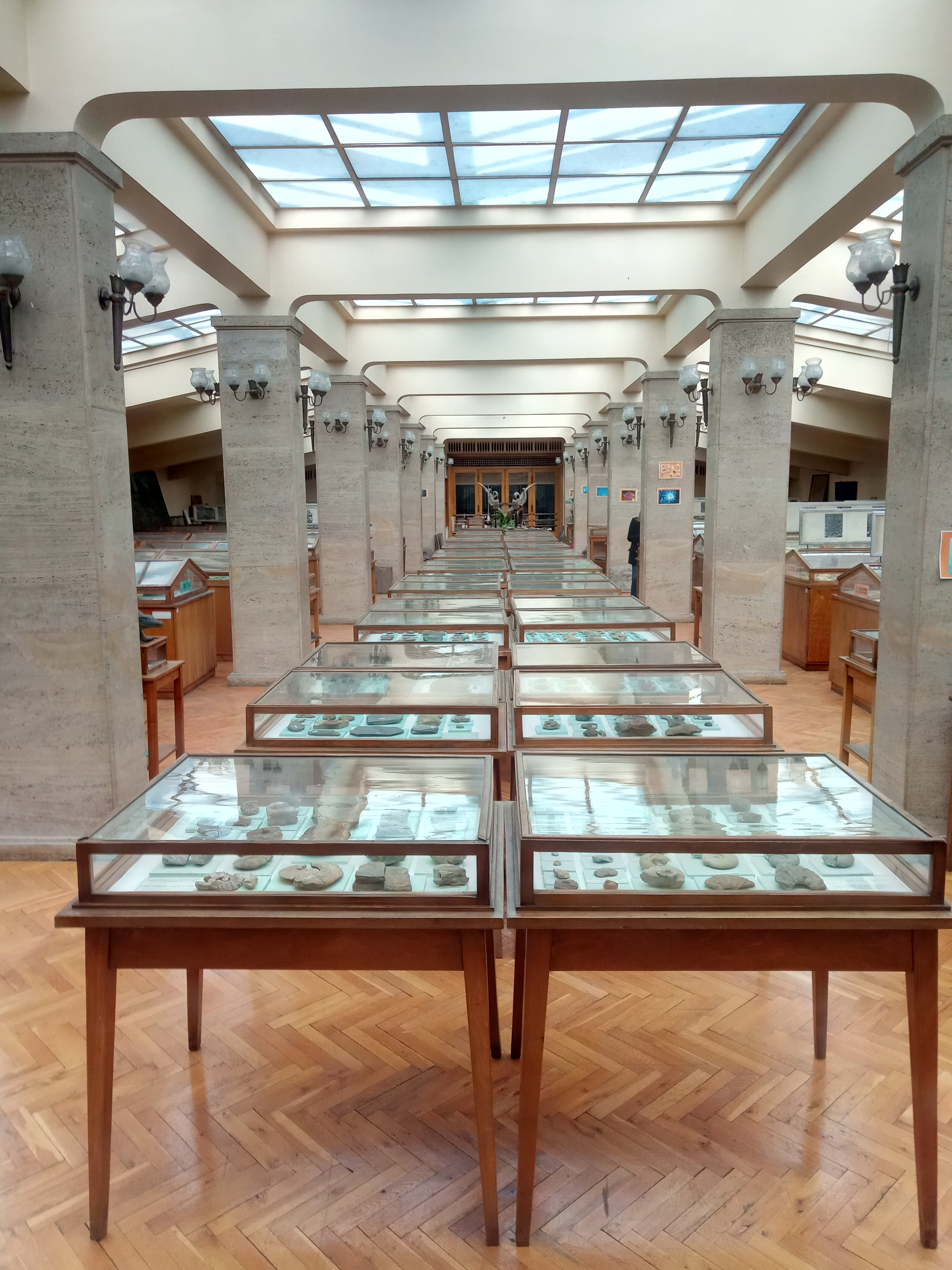
The Main Hall of the Museum of Paleontology and Historical Geology, Sofia University

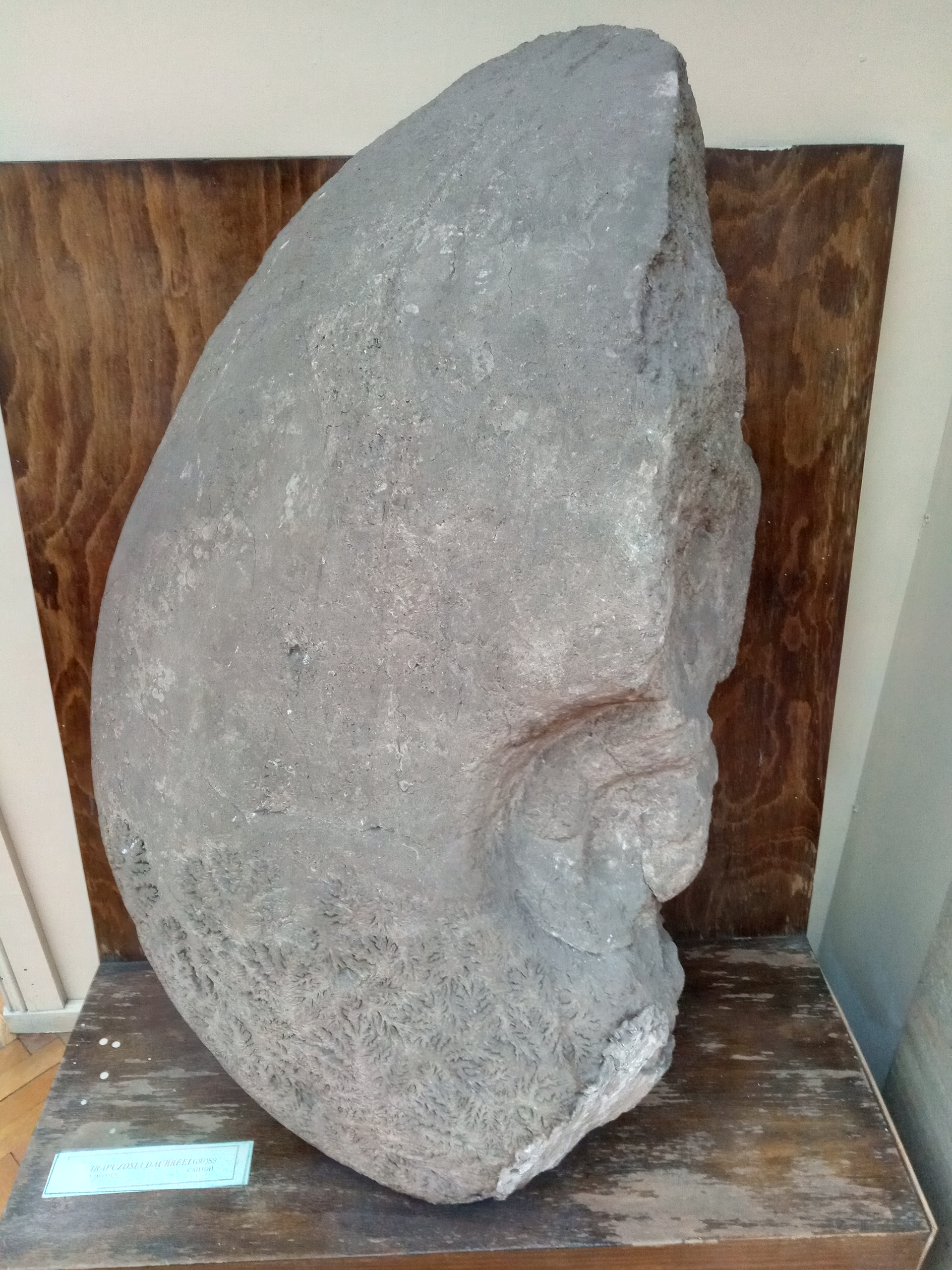
Parapuzosia doubreei (Grossouvre, 1894), Santonian, Shumen, exhibit at the SUMPHG

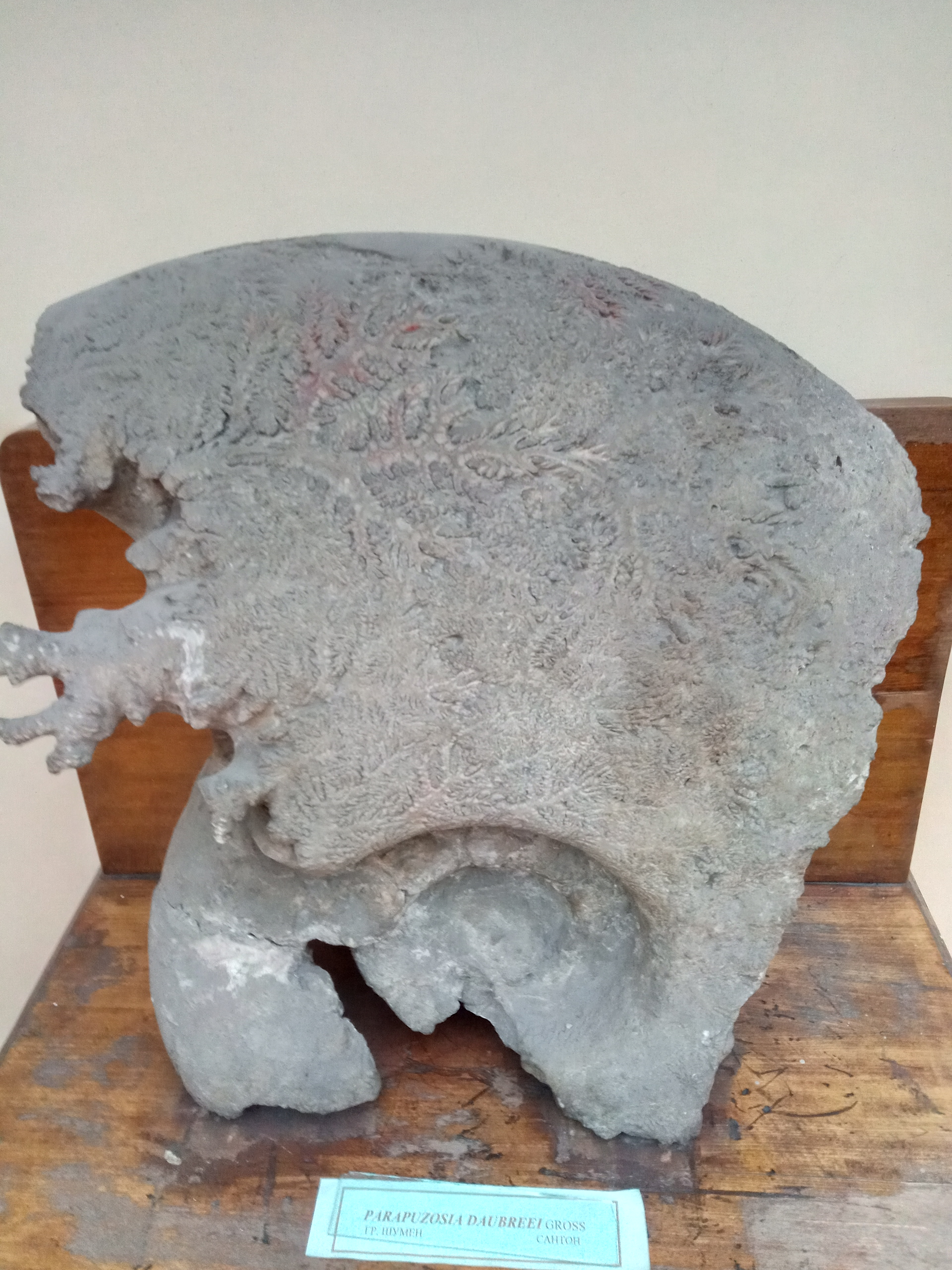
Parapuzosia daubreei (Grossouvre, 1894), Santonian, Shumen, exhibit at the SUMPHG

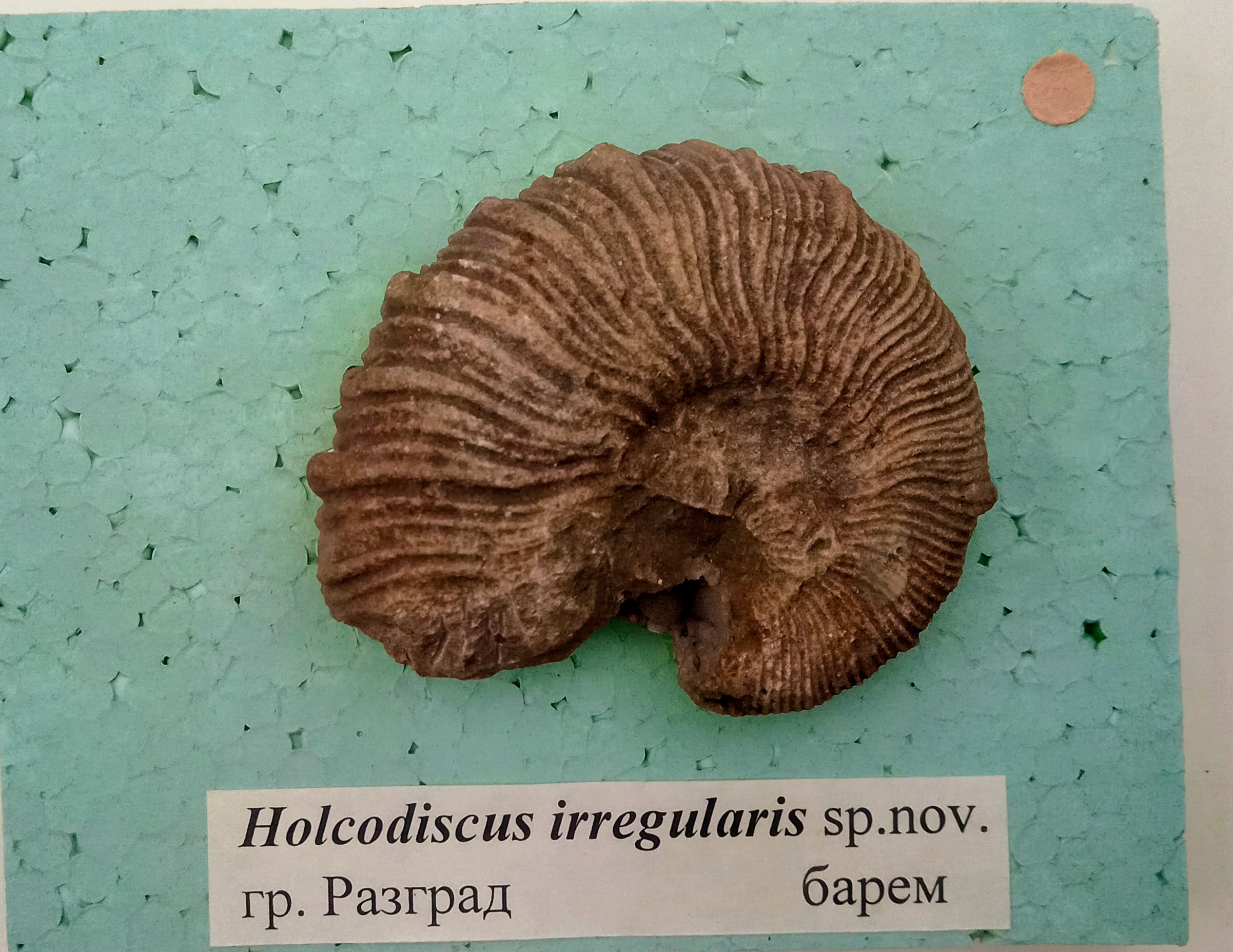
Holcodiscus irregularis Tzankov, 1935, Barremian, Razgrad, Cr1 1711 (Coll. V. Tzankov) at SUMPHG

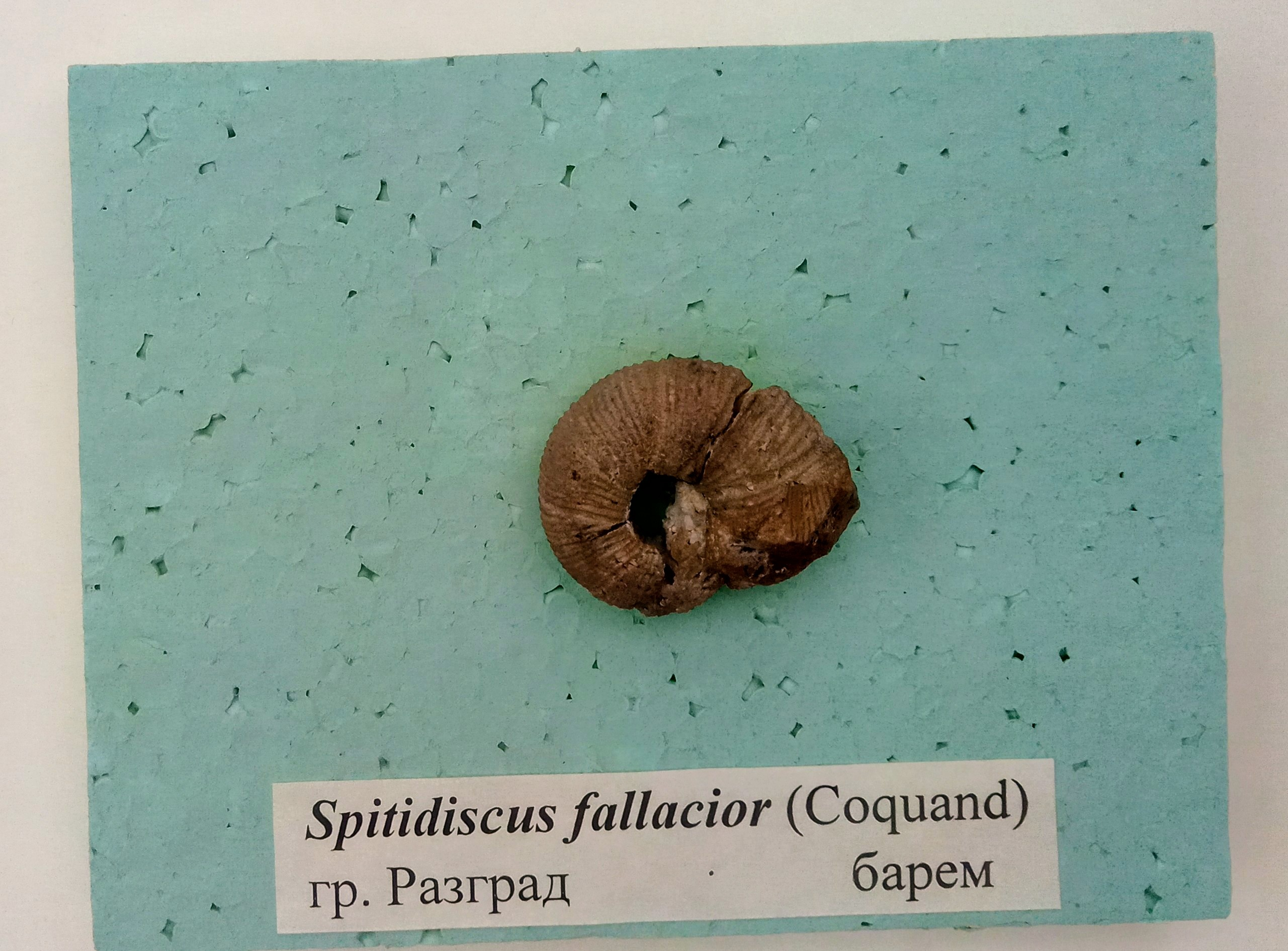
Spitidiscus fallacior (Coquand), Barremian, Razgrad, Cr1 1713 (Coll. V.Tzankov) at the SUMPHG

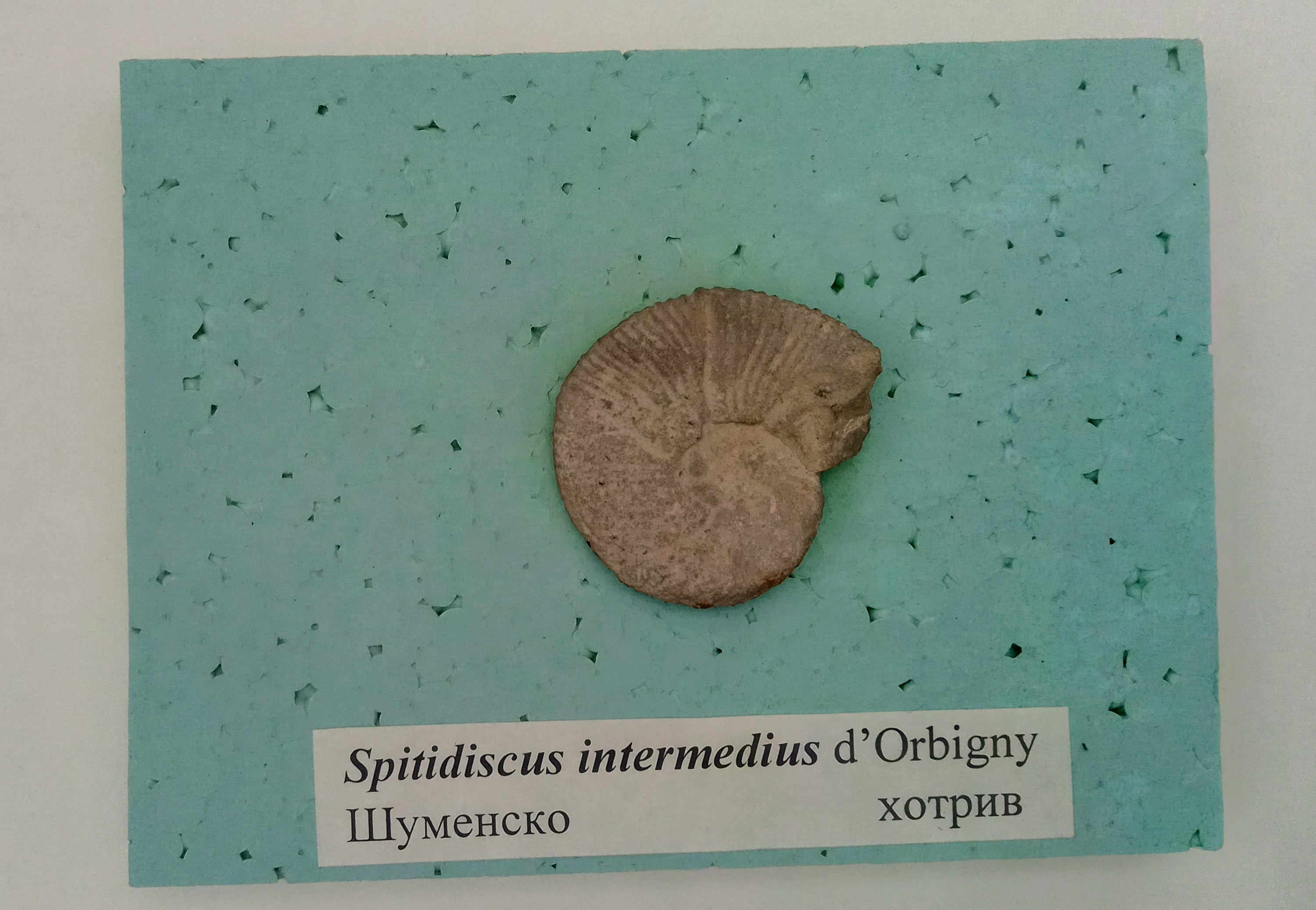
Spitidiscus intermedius d'Orbigny, Hauterivian, Shumen Province, (Coll. V.Tzankov) at the SUMPHG

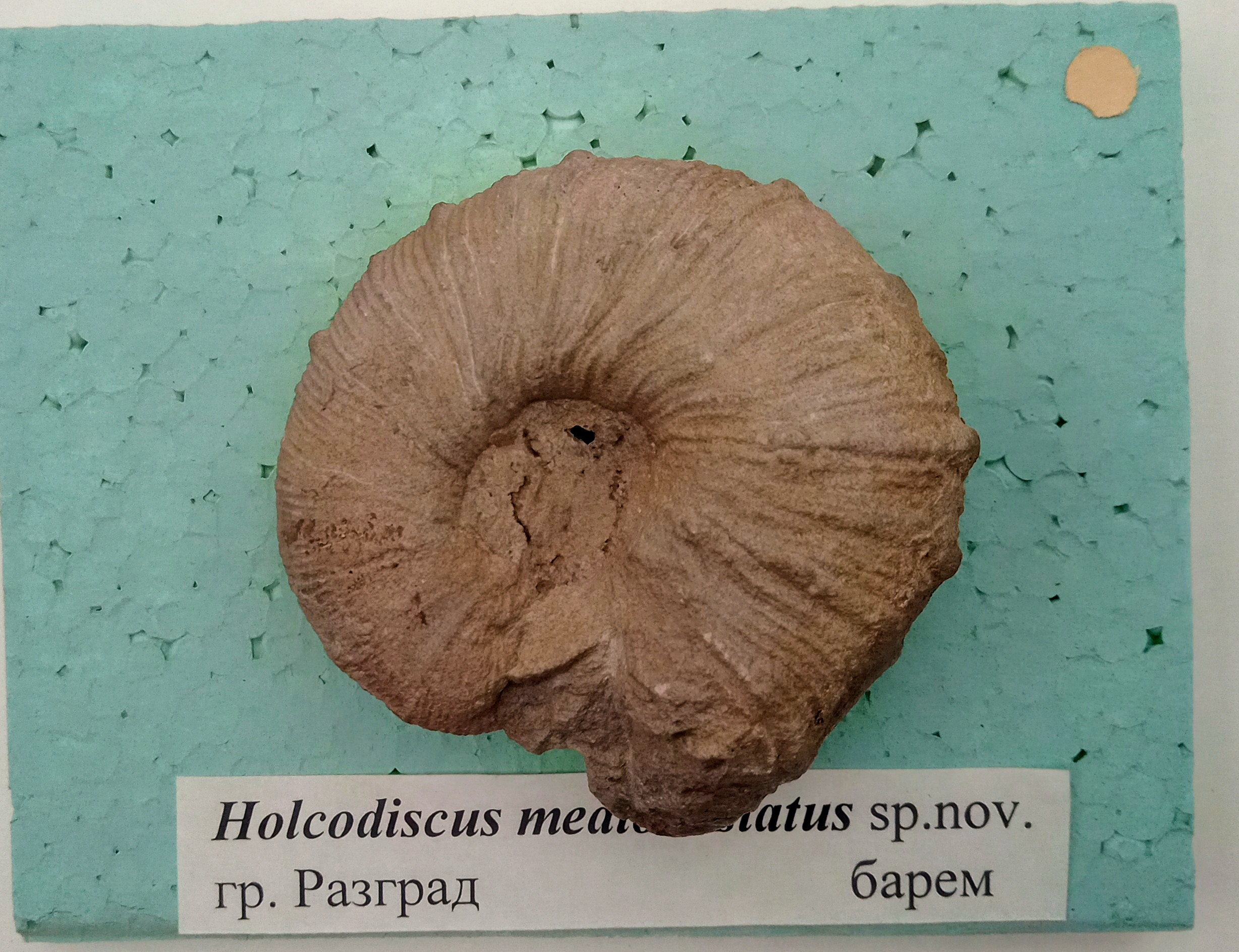
Holcodiscus mediocostatus Tzankov, 1935, Barremian, Razgrad, Cr1 1716 (Coll. V. Tzankov) at the SUMPHG
