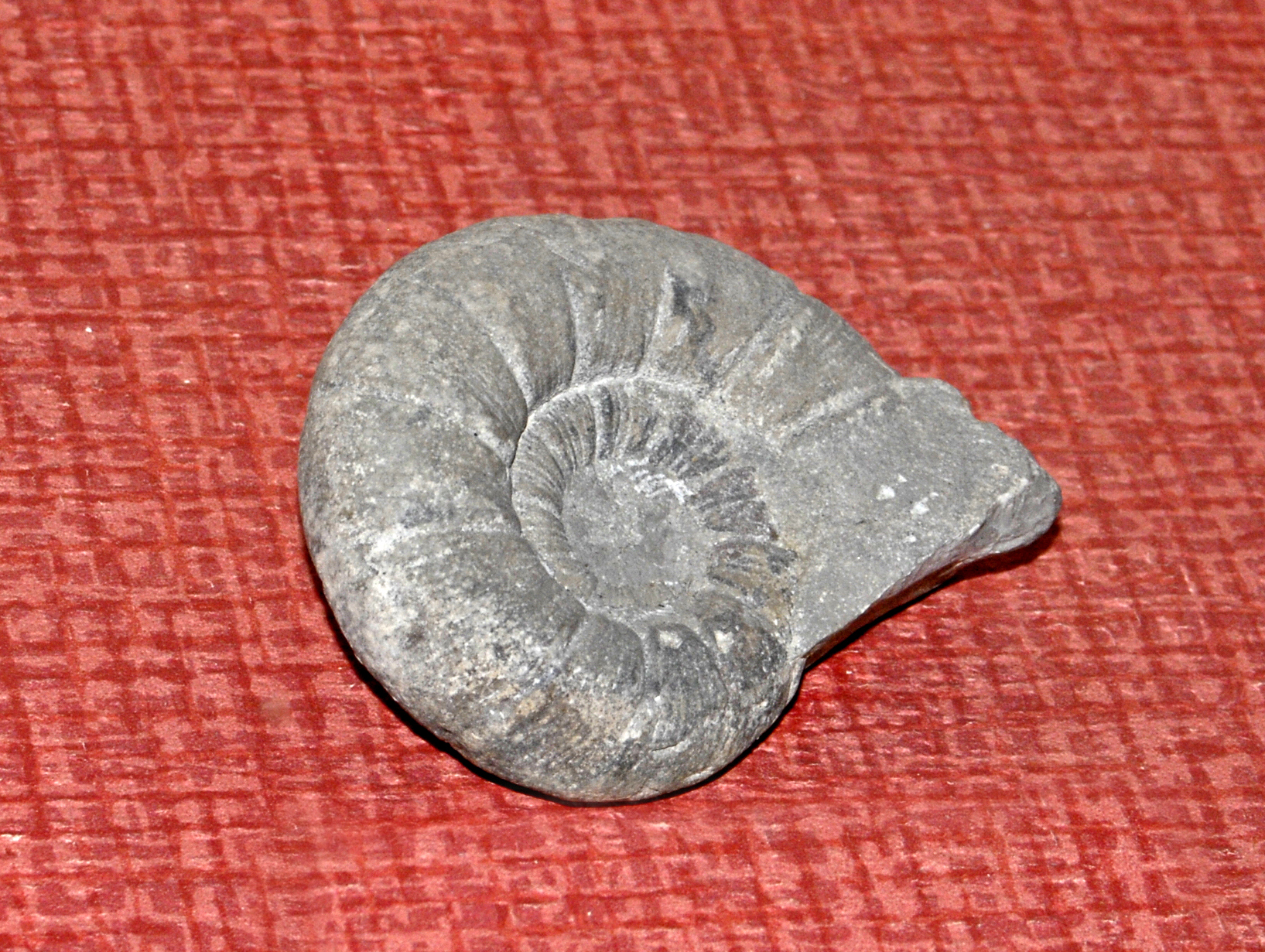
- Spitidiscus species from Alpes-de-Haute-Provence

Scientific classification
- Kingdom: Animalia
- Phylum: Mollusca
- Class: Cephalopoda
- Subclass: †Ammonoidea
- Order: †Ammonitida
- Superfamily: †Desmoceratoidea
- Family: †Holcodiscidae; Spath, 1923

Synonyms
- Astieridiscidae Tzankov & Breskovski, 1982; Metahoplidae Tzankov & Breskovski, 1982

= Holcodiscidae =

Holcodiscidae Temporal range: Cretaceous

Extinct family of ammonites

Holcodiscidae is an ammonite family placed in the superfamily Desmoceratoidea.

== Description ==
Moderately involute with rounded, rectangular, or depressed whorl section; straight or sinuous, fine, dense ribs typically continuing over venter and may be periodically truncated by oblique, enlarged ribs, with or without umbilical, lateral and ventrolateral tubercles. Suture rather simple.

== Genera ==
- Astieridiscus
- Holcodiscus
- Jeanthieuloyites
- Parasaynoceras
- Spitidiscus

== Distribution ==
Fossils of species within this family have been found in the Cretaceous sediments in Argentina, Austria, Bulgaria, Chile, Colombia, the Czech Republic, Czechoslovakia, France, Hungary, Italy, Mexico, Morocco, Portugal, Romania, Slovakia, Spain and Russia.
