= Helena Shovelton =

Dame Helena Shovelton DBE FRSA

Chief Executive, British Lung Foundation
- In office 2001–2012

Chair, Audit Commission
- In office 1998–2001

Chair, National Association of Citizens Advice Bureaux
- In office 1994–1999

Personal details
- Born: Helena Richards; 28 May 1945 (age 81)
- Occupation: Public servant, charity administrator

Dame Helena Shovelton (née Richards; born 28 May 1945) is former Chair of the UK National Association of Citizens Advice Bureaux, former Chair of the UK National Lottery Commission, and former Chief Executive of the British Lung Foundation.

== Controversy ==
Before resigning from the National Lottery Commission, Shovelton ordered that the then-operator, Camelot, be excluded from bidding for the next seven-year Lottery licence. That decision eased the way for Richard Branson's rival, People's Lottery. However, High Court Justice Richards resurrected Camelot's bid, ruling that the commission's dealings with Camelot had shown "a marked lack of even-handedness". The judge added that "there is in my judgment no escaping the conclusion that the procedure decided on by the commission was conspicuously unfair to Camelot."

== Personal life ==
Helena Shovelton is a daughter of Denis Richards, OBE, the official historian of the Royal Air Force. She was educated at the North London Collegiate School and Regent Street Polytechnic; later she gained an MBA from Strathclyde University. She married Patrick Shovelton in 1968; he died in 2012.

== Career ==
Her public career began with the Citizens' Advice Bureau in Tunbridge Wells. She went on to chair the organisation's national association. She also served as chairman of the Audit Commission, and as a member of the Monopolies and Mergers Commission and the Local Government Commission.
