= Hauterivian =

Third age of the early Cretaceous

- 132.6 ± 0.6 – 125.77 Ma

Chronology
← / K-Pg mass extinction
Subdivision of the Cretaceous according to the ICS, as of 2024. Vertical axis scale: Millions of years ago

Etymology
- Name formality: Formal

Usage information
- Celestial body: Earth
- Regional usage: Global (ICS)
- Time scale(s) used: ICS Time Scale

Definition
- Chronological unit: Age
- Stratigraphic unit: Stage
- Time span formality: Formal
- Lower boundary definition: FAD of the Ammonite genus Acanthodiscus
- Lower boundary GSSP: La Charce, Drôme, France; 44.4694°N 5.4437°E
- Lower GSSP ratified: December 2019
- Upper boundary definition: Not formally defined
- Upper boundary definition candidates: FAD of the Spitidiscus hugii-Spitidiscus vandeckii Ammonite group
- Upper boundary GSSP candidate section(s): Río Argos, Caravaca de la Cruz, Murcia Province, Spain

The Hauterivian is, in the geologic timescale, an age in the Early Cretaceous Epoch or a stage in the Lower Cretaceous Series. It spans the time between 132.6 ± 0.6 Ma and 125.77 (million years ago). The Hauterivian is preceded by the Valanginian and succeeded by the Barremian.

== Stratigraphic definitions ==
The Hauterivian was introduced in scientific literature by Swiss geologist Eugène Renevier in 1873. It is named after the Swiss town of Hauterive at the shore of Lake Neuchâtel.

The base of the Hauterivian is defined as the place in the stratigraphic column where the ammonite genus Acanthodiscus first appears. A reference profile for the base (a GSSP) was officially ratified by the International Union of Geological Sciences in December of 2019, and is placed in La Charce, France. The top of the Hauterivian (the base of the Barremian) is at the first appearance of ammonite species Spitidiscus hugii.

In the ammonite biostratigraphy of the Tethys domain, the Hauterivian contains seven ammonite biozones:

- zone of Pseudothurmannia ohmi
- zone of Balearites balearis
- zone of Plesiospitidiscus ligatus
- zone of Subsaynella sayni
- zone of Lyticoceras nodosoplicatus
- zone of Crioceratites loryi
- zone of Acanthodiscus radiatus

== Climate ==
Some palaeoclimatological studies indicate that a brief ice age, known as the Hauterivian cold snap, occurred during this age. The Hauterivian cold snap appears to be associated with permafrost at high elevations and large ice sheets that potentially stretched as far south as the modern Iberian Peninsula, based on the existence of Hauterivian ice-rafted dropstones in Iberia. Cold conditions are also known to have existed in the Southern Hemisphere during the same time period, based on records from Australia. Similar cold periods with associated glaciations are also known from the earlier Valanginian and the later Aptian & early Albian periods, all contrasting with the typical image of the Cretaceous as a greenhouse period.
