= La Charce =

- Commune
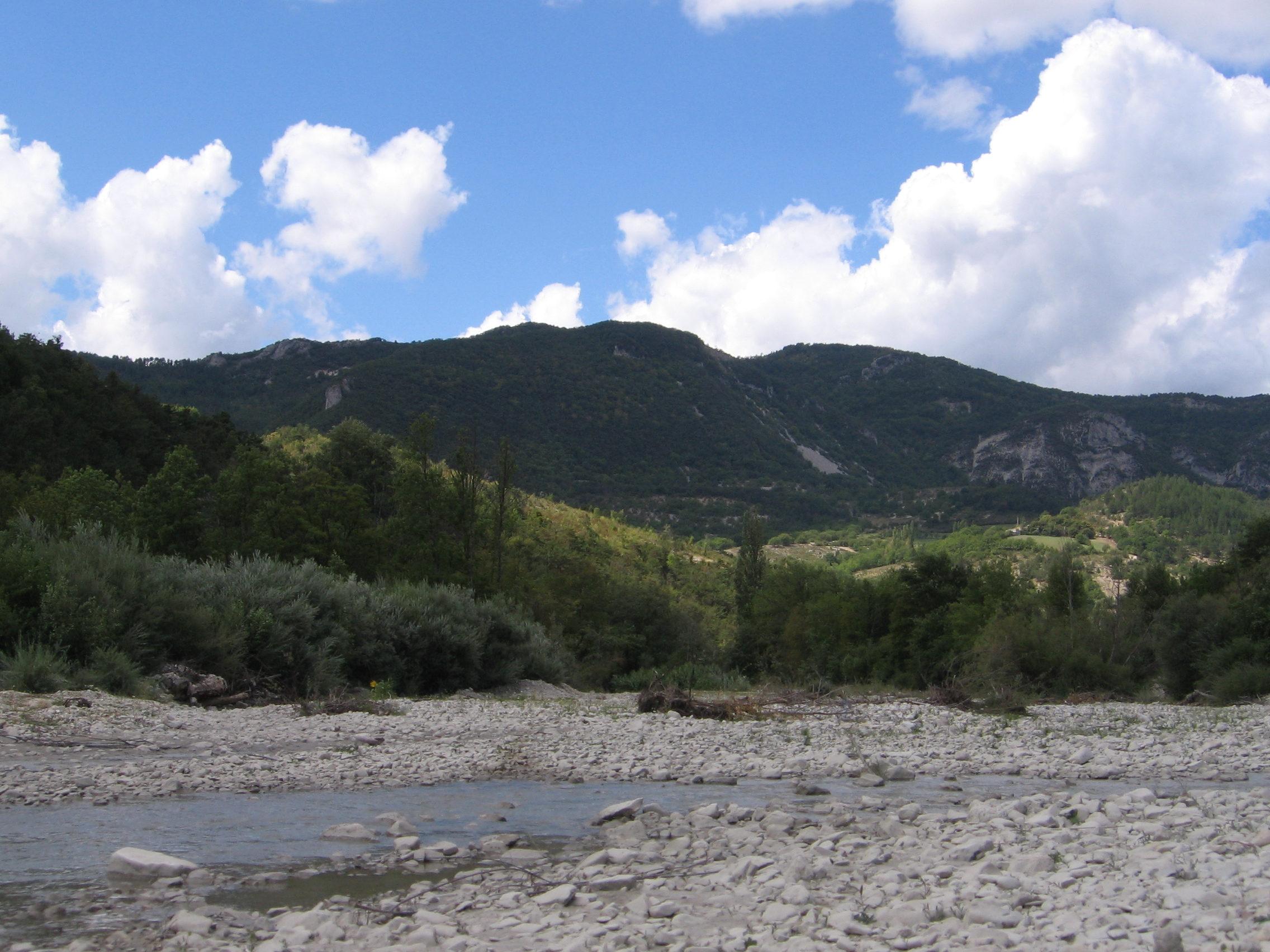
- The Oule river at La Charce

- Coat of arms
- Location of La Charce
- Location within France Location within Auvergne-Rhône-Alpes
- Coordinates: 44°28′17″N 5°27′05″E
- Country: France
- Region: Auvergne-Rhône-Alpes
- Department: Drôme
- Arrondissement: Nyons
- Canton: Nyons et Baronnies

Government
  - Mayor (2020–2026): Pascal Cirer-Methel
- Area^{1}: 9.43 km^{2} (3.64 sq mi)
- Highest elevation: 1,327 m (4,354 ft)
- Lowest elevation: 584 m (1,916 ft)
- Population (2023): 23
  - Density: 2.4/km^{2} (6.3/sq mi)
- Time zone: UTC+01:00 (CET)
  - Summer (DST): UTC+02:00 (CEST)
- INSEE/Postal code: 26075 /26470
- ^{1} French Land Register data, which excludes lakes, ponds, glaciers > 1 km^{2} (0.386 sq mi or 247 acres) and river estuaries.

La Charce (French pronunciation: [la ʃaʁs]) is a commune in the Drôme department in southeastern France.

== Population ==
Historical population
Year	Pop.	±% p.a.
1968	46	—
1975	47	+0.31%
1982	38	−2.99%
1990	36	−0.67%
1999	48	+3.25%
2007	43	−1.37%
2012	29	−7.58%
2017	34	+3.23%
2023	23	−6.31%
Source: INSEE

== See also ==
- Communes of the Drôme department
