= Claud William Wright =

British amateur paleontologist and public servant

Claud William Wright CB FGS
- Born: 9 January 1917; Ellenborough, Yorkshire, England
- Died: 15 February 2010 (aged 93); Burford, Oxfordshire, England
- Citizenship: U.K.
- Education: Christ Church, Oxford
- Occupation: civil servant
- Employer(s): Ministry of Defence; Ministry of Education; Ministry of Arts; Wolfson College, Oxford
- Known for: expert in the disciplines of geology, palaeontology, and archaeology
- Notable work: Wright, C. W. with J.H. Calloman and M.K. Howarth (1996). "Mollusca 4 Revised, Cretaceous Ammonoidea". In Roger L. Kaesler (ed.). Treatise on Invertebrate Paleontology, Part L. Vol. 4. Boulder, Colorado and Lawrence, Kansas: The Geological Society of America & University of Kansas Press. OCLC 61988855 – via Internet Archive.
- Spouse: Alison Violet Readman (m. 1947; died 2003)
- Children: four daughters and a son
- Parent(s): Horace Vipan Wright; Catherine Margaret Sales

Claud William Wright CB FGS (9 January 1917, Ellenborough, Yorkshire, England – 15 February 2010, Burford, Oxfordshire, England), Aka Willy Wright, was a senior British civil servant who was also an expert in the disciplines of geology, palaeontology, and archaeology.

== Life ==
He was educated at Charterhouse and Christ Church, Oxford. At Oxford, he was influenced by the geologist W. J. Arkell, an interest that became a serious hobby. His professional career was in the War Office/Ministry of Defence, where he reached the rank of Deputy Secretary.

In 1971, he transferred to the Ministry of Education and there was involved with the establishment of the first Ministry of Arts. In these posts, he worked directly with Margaret Thatcher and Lord Eccles.

It was in Wright's hobbies where he made his greatest mark. Whilst working as a civil servant he was, between 1956 and 1958, President of the Geologists' Association. After he "retired" in 1976 he could devote most of his time to his interests. From 1977 to 1983, he was a Research Fellow at Wolfson College, Oxford.

He was married to Alison Readman (1922-2003) with four daughters and a son.

== Honours ==
For his work with the Civil Service work he was awarded the CB (1969). He won many prizes, medals, and a Fellowships as an Hon. Associate of the British Museum) for his hobby work. Fifteen genera or species of fossil bear his name: ammonites, starfish, a brachiopod, a snail, and a crab.

== Publications ==
He published many articles on such diverse topics as ammonites, starfish, invertebrates, Cretaceous crabs, and the Bridlington Giant Flying Lizard.

== Collection ==
Wright's collection was split between the Natural History Museum (25,500 pieces in all) and the Wright Library in the Oxford University Museum.

== Ferriby boats ==
While walking with his brother beside the River Humber on holiday, Wright found three Bronze Age Ferriby Boats, one of which is now in the National Maritime Museum.

== Sources ==
- "C. W. Wright: Distinguished amateur palaeontologist, naturalist and civil servant who led renaissance of provincial museums nationwide". The Times: 70. 24 February 2010.
- Kennedy, W.J. (2006). "C. W. Wright: a most professional amateur". Proceedings of the Geologists' Association. 117 (1): 9–40. Bibcode:2006PrGA..117....9K. doi:10.1016/S0016-7878(06)80028-3.
- Shovelton, Patrick (8 March 2010). "Senior civil servant who was also a leading expert in geology, palaeontology and archaeology — Obituary". The Independent.
- "WRIGHT, Claud William", Who's Who 2010, A & C Black, 2010; online edition, Oxford University Press, December 2010; online edition, March 2010. Accessed 1 September 2010.
- Portraits of Claud William Wright at the National Portrait Gallery, London
- CW Wright publications indexed by Google Scholar
- Quotations related to Claud William Wright at Wikiquote
