= Patrick Shovelton =

Walter Patrick Shovelton, CB, CMG (18 August 1919 – 20 January 2012) was a British civil servant and subsequently a transport executive.

== Career ==
Shovelton was educated at Charterhouse School and Keble College, Oxford. After wartime service in the Honourable Artillery Company he joined the Civil Service in 1946.

He held various posts in the Ministry of Transport until 1959 when he transferred to the new Ministry of Aviation, becoming its Under-Secretary in 1966 before moving to the Ministry of Technology in the same year.

In 1970 the Ministry of Technology was absorbed into the Department of Trade and Industry (DTI) and Shovelton was a leading member of the UK negotiating team for entry into the European Economic Community 1970–72. When the DTI was broken up in 1974 Shovelton was posted to the Department of Prices and Consumer Protection. In 1976 he moved to the Department of Trade and led the UK negotiating team for the Bermuda II agreement in 1977 and the so-called "Bermuda 2A" agreement in 1978.

In 1978 Shovelton retired from the Civil Service and was Director-General of the General Council of British Shipping 1978–85; later he was a UK director and then UK vice-chairman of the Maersk conglomerate. He also wrote obituaries for The Independent.

== Awards/honours ==
Shovelton was appointed CMG in 1972 and CB in 1976.

== Personal life ==
Shovelton married Marjorie Manners in 1942; they were divorced in 1967. In 1968 he married Helena Richards.
