= Brestak =

Brestak Брестак
- Location of Brestak
- Coordinates: 43.45965°N 27.5346°E
- Country: Bulgaria
- Provinces (Oblast): Varna
- Elevation: 294 m (965 ft)

Population (December 2011)
  - Total: 952
- Time zone: UTC+2 (EET)
  - Summer (DST): UTC+3 (EEST)
- Postal Code: 9290
- Area code: 05136

Brestak (in Bulgarian: Брестак) is a village in northern Bulgaria, Valchi Dol Municipality, Varna Province. Before 1934, its name was Karaagach (in Bulgarian: Караагач). In 1961, its population was 2,476, and in 1989 - 1,844.
