= Sofia University Museum of Paleontology and Historical Geology =

Museum in Sofia, Bulgaria

Sofia University “St. Kliment Ohridski” Museum of Paleontology and Historical Geology
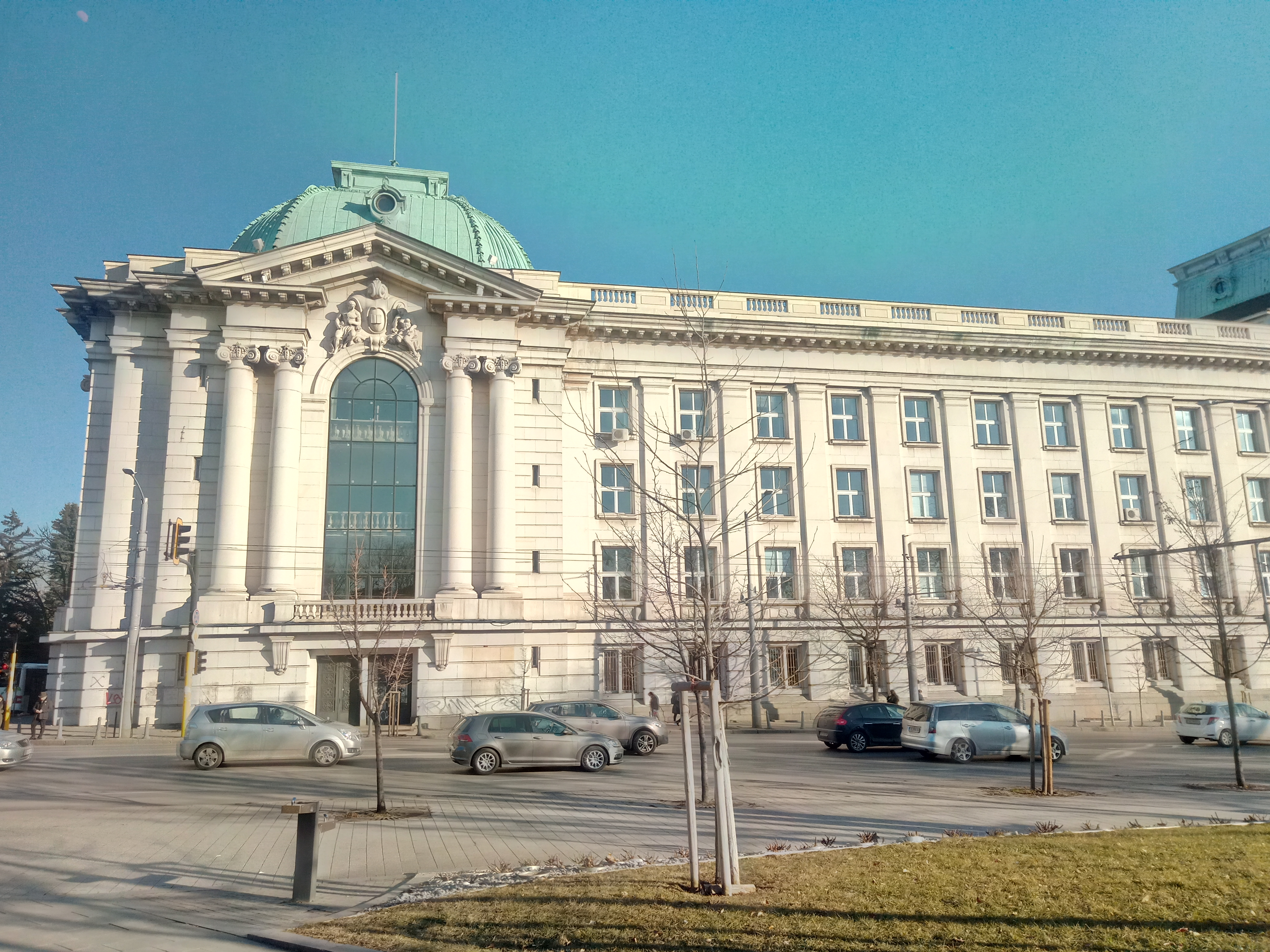
- Sofia University “St. Kliment Ohridski” Museum of Paleontology and Historical Geology is located within the 5th floor of the North Wing of the Main Building of the University
- Established: 1897
- Location: 15 Tzar Osvoboditel Blvd., Sofia, Bulgaria
- Coordinates: 42°41′36.2394″N 23°20′6.8274″E
- Type: Natural history museum, University museum, Evolutionary biology
- Collection size: vertebrate fossils, invertebrate fossils, trace fossils, micro-fossils, geologic maps (estimated total specimens - 150,000; estimated type specimens - 100)
- Curator: Svetlozar Seferinov
- Website: gpff.gea.uni-sofia.bg/facilities/museum/

The Sofia University "St. Kliment Ohridski" Museum of Paleontology and Historical Geology (SUMPHG) (Bulgarian: Музей по палеонтология и исторична геология към Софийския университет "Свети Климент Охридски"), is a paleontology museum located in the main building of Sofia University “St. Kliment Ohridski", Sofia, Bulgaria.

== History ==
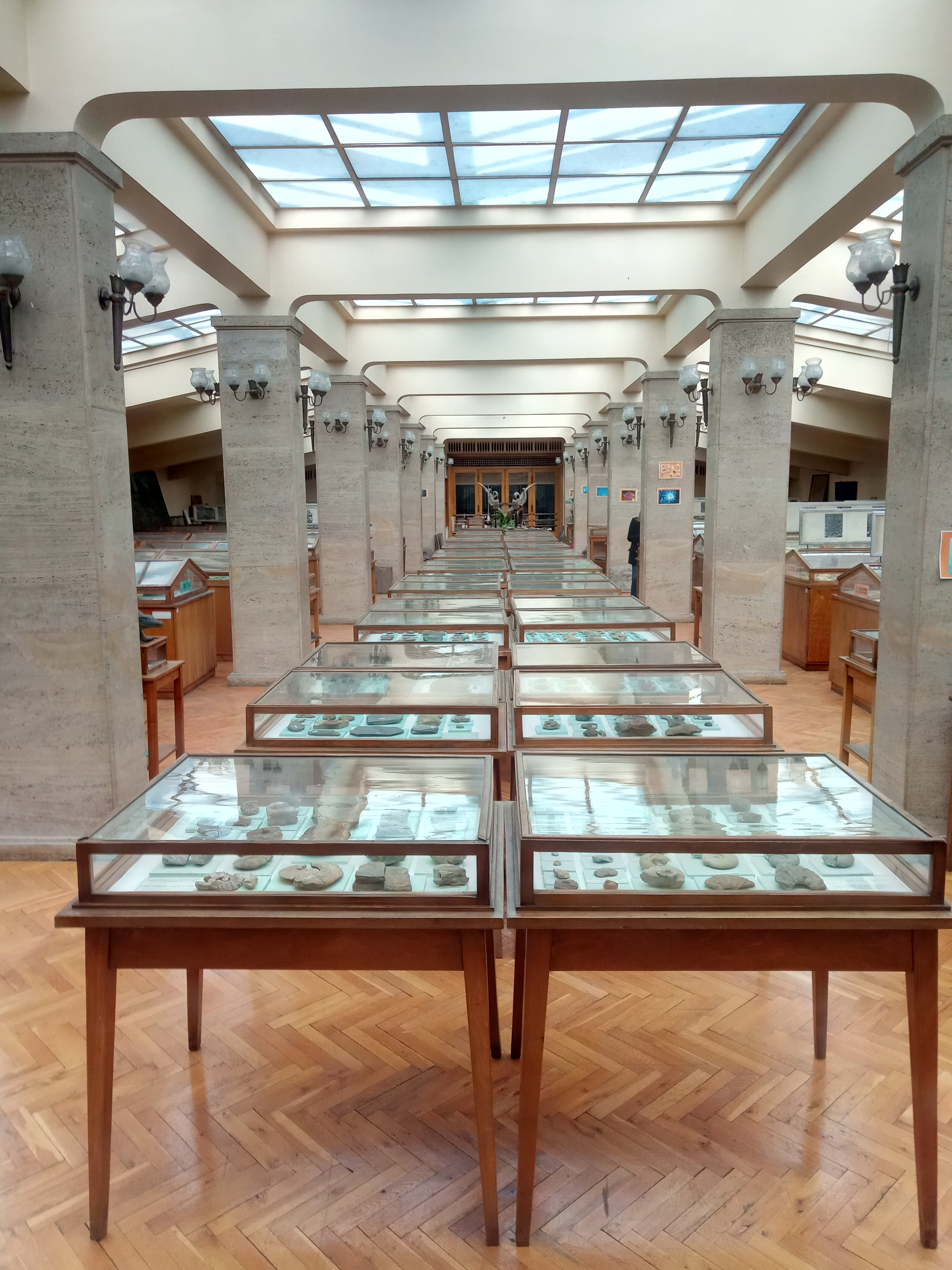
The Main Hall of the SUMPHG

The museum is within the main building of Sofia University, designed by Jean Bréasson, re-designed by Yordan Milanov, and later by Ljuben Konstantinov. Its collections are primarily intended for research and are, thus, not accessible to the public. A limited number of fossils from the collection is on display in the SUMPHG, and is one of the primary localities for storing fossils collected in Bulgaria. The original fossils, around which the current collection has grown, were those gathered by the first Bulgarian state geologist Georgi Zlatarski (1854 - 1909) and those purchased from Dr. A. Krantz. Later specimens collected by doctoral students and as part of the Bulgarian geological surveys were added.

== Faculty ==
Many notable Bulgarian paleontologists have worked at SUMPHG, including Peter Bakalov, Vassil Tzankov, Ivan Nikolov, Natalia Dimitrova, Milka Entcheva, Emilia Kojumdjieva, Nonka Motekova, Stoycho Breskovski, Angel Pamouktchiev et al.

== Public access ==
Admission is free to the museum for all visitors. The museum is open 10 am - 12 am, 1 pm - 4 pm Monday to Friday. It is closed on Saturdays and Sundays. SUMPHG is an important venue for widening interest in paleontology, evolutionary biology and Earth sciences.

The museum logo is based on the Deinotherium skeleton displayed by the entrance.

== Gallery ==
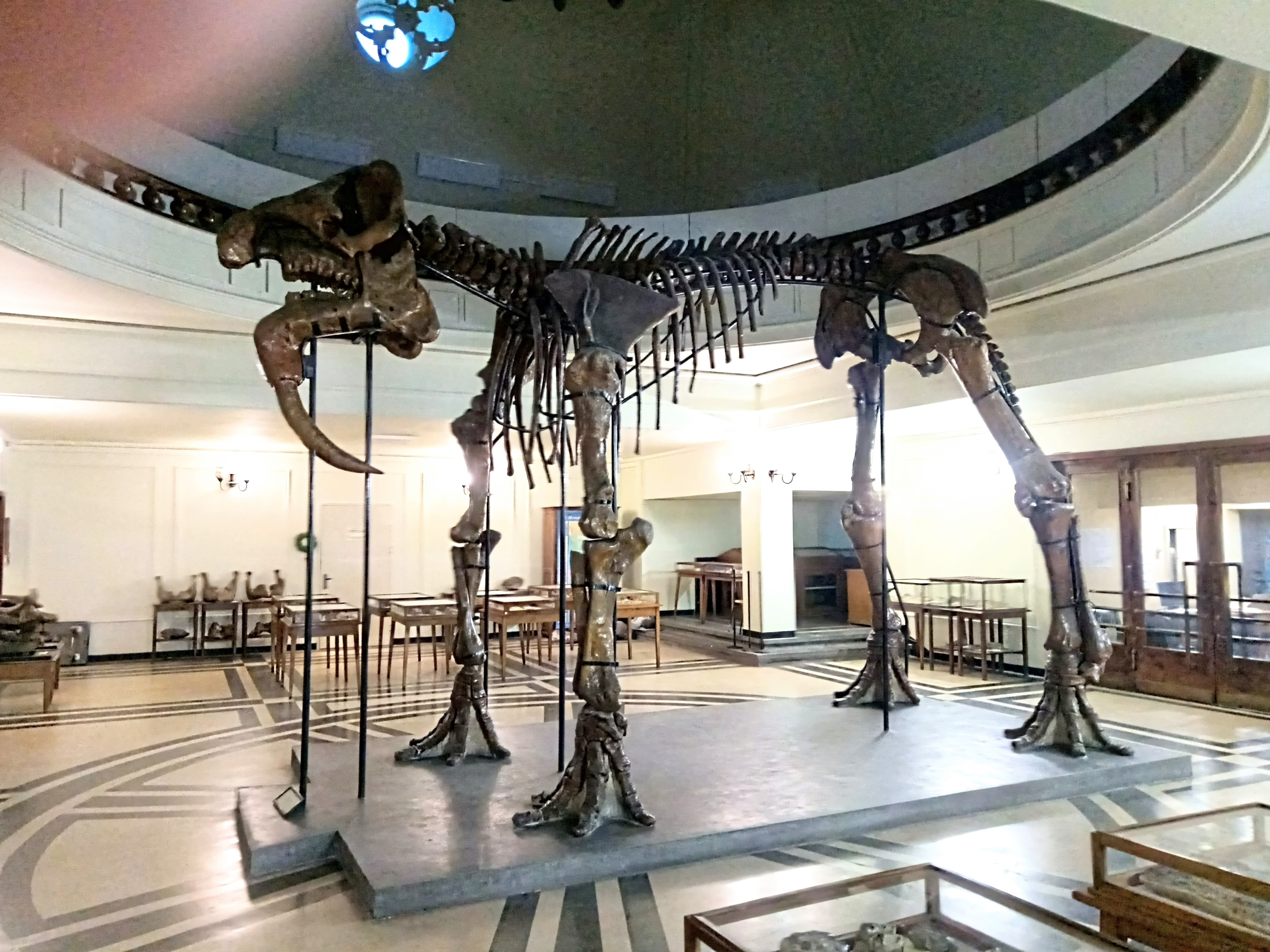
Deinotherium thraceiensis (Kovachev, 1964), Miocene, Ezerovo, Plovdiv District - The Entrance hall of the Sofia University "St. Kliment Ohridski" Museum of Paleontology and Historical Geology

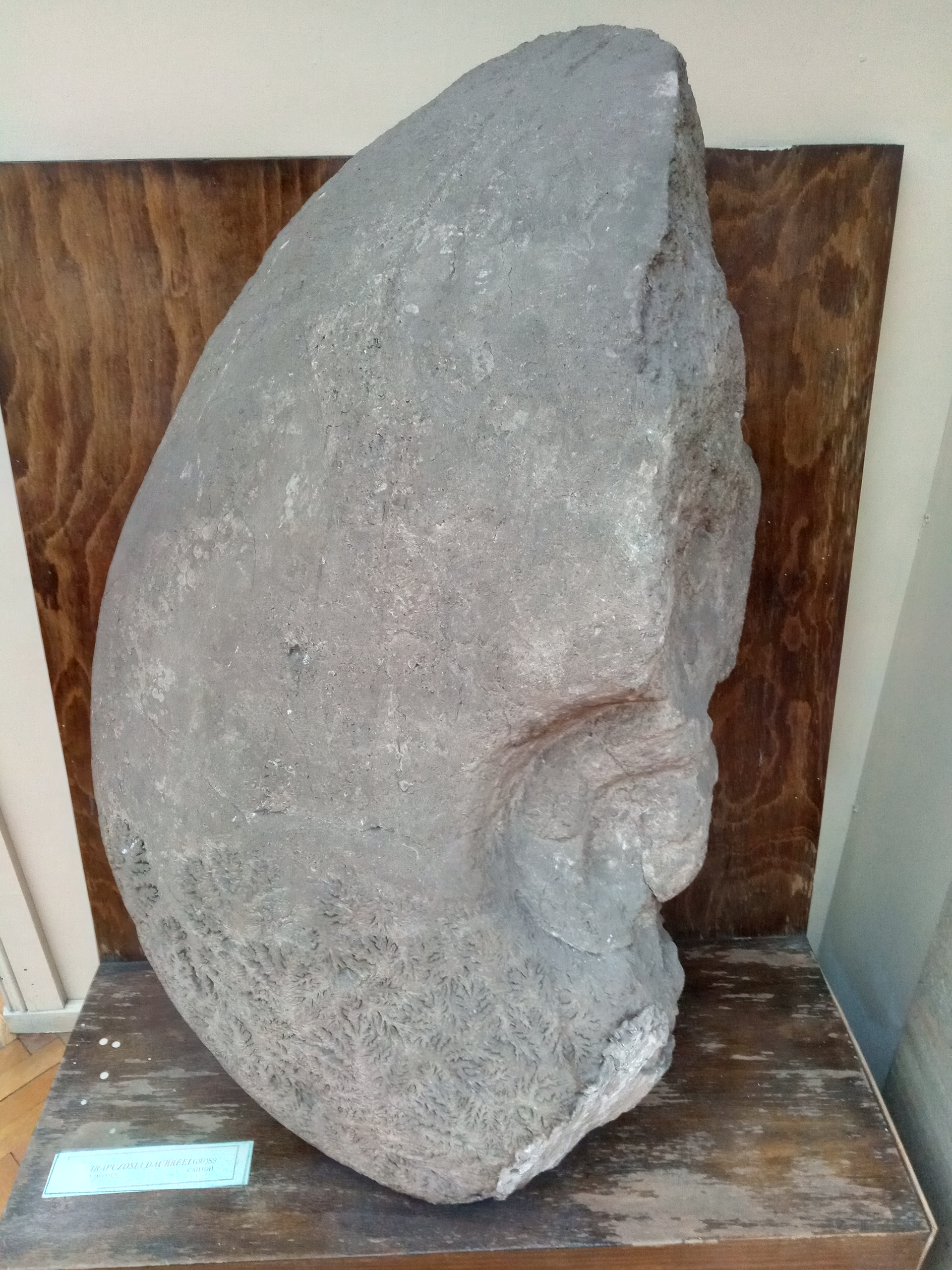
Parapuzosia daubreei (de Grossouvre, 1894), Santonian, Shumen in the Main Hall of the Sofia University "St. Kliment Ohridski" Museum of Paleontology and Historical Geology

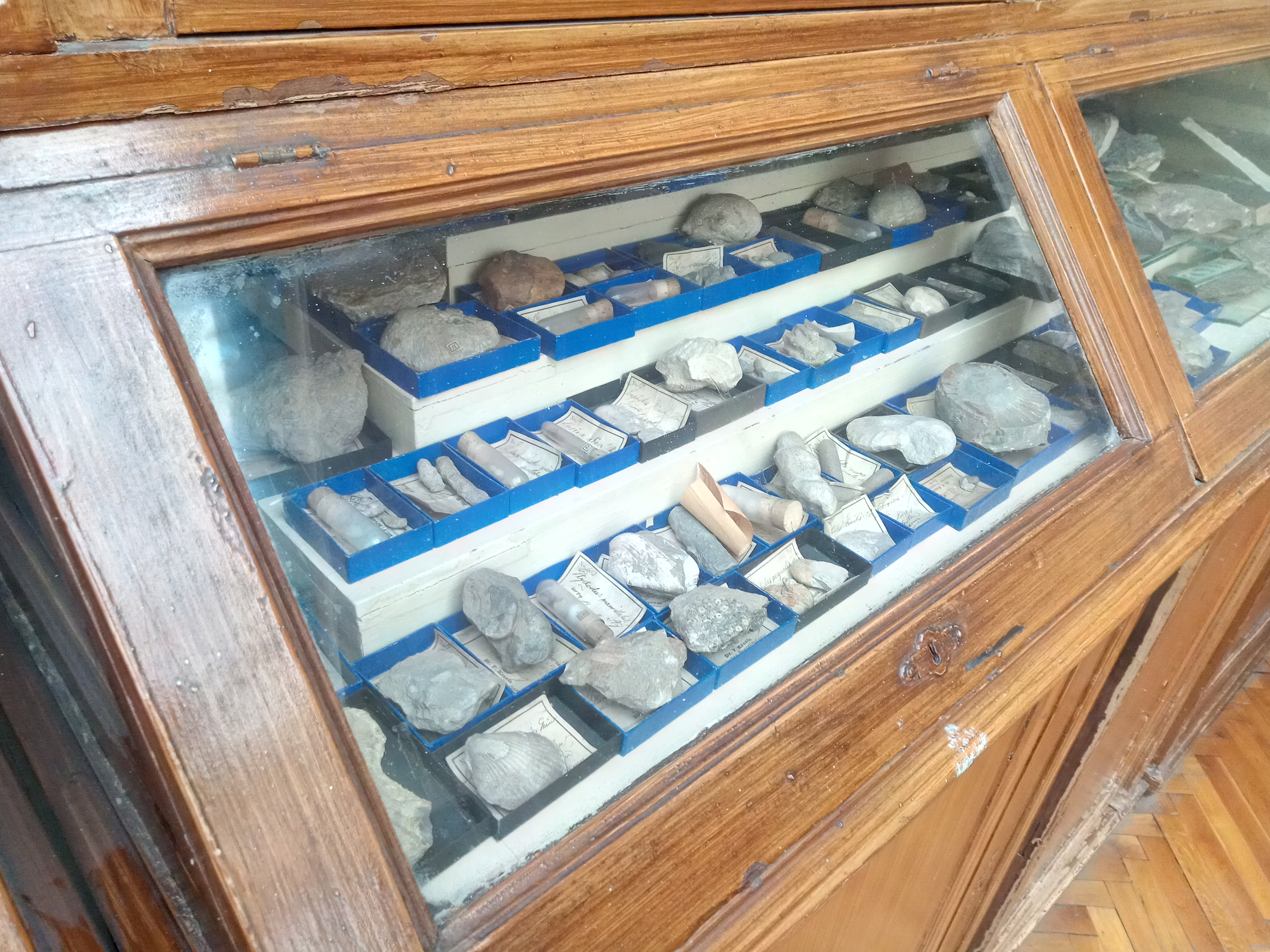
Samples of the Krantz paleontological collection of the Sofia University "St. Kliment Ohridski" Museum of Paleontology and Historical Geology

=== Exhibits of geologic eras and periods ===
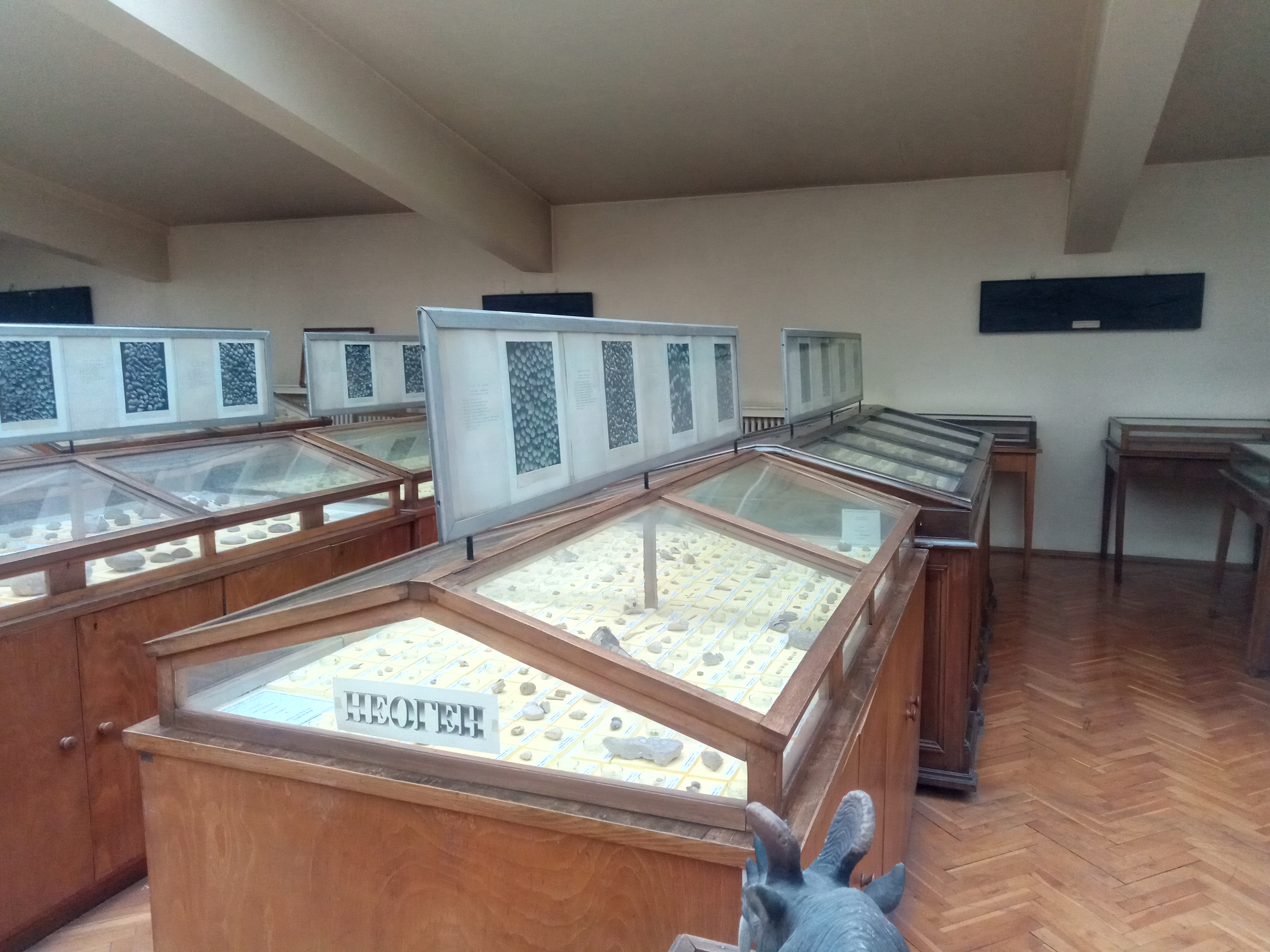
The Neogene period

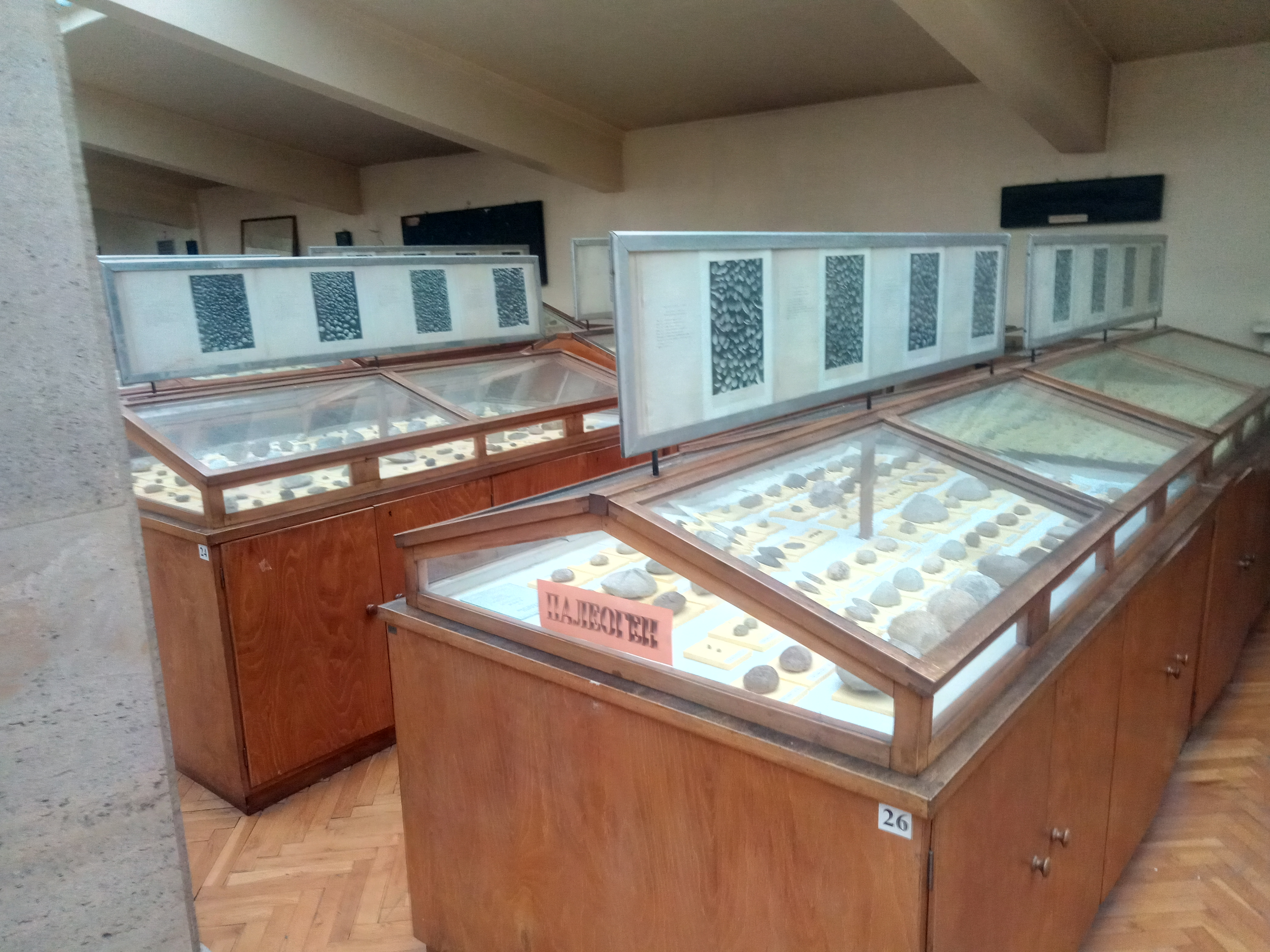
The Paleogene period

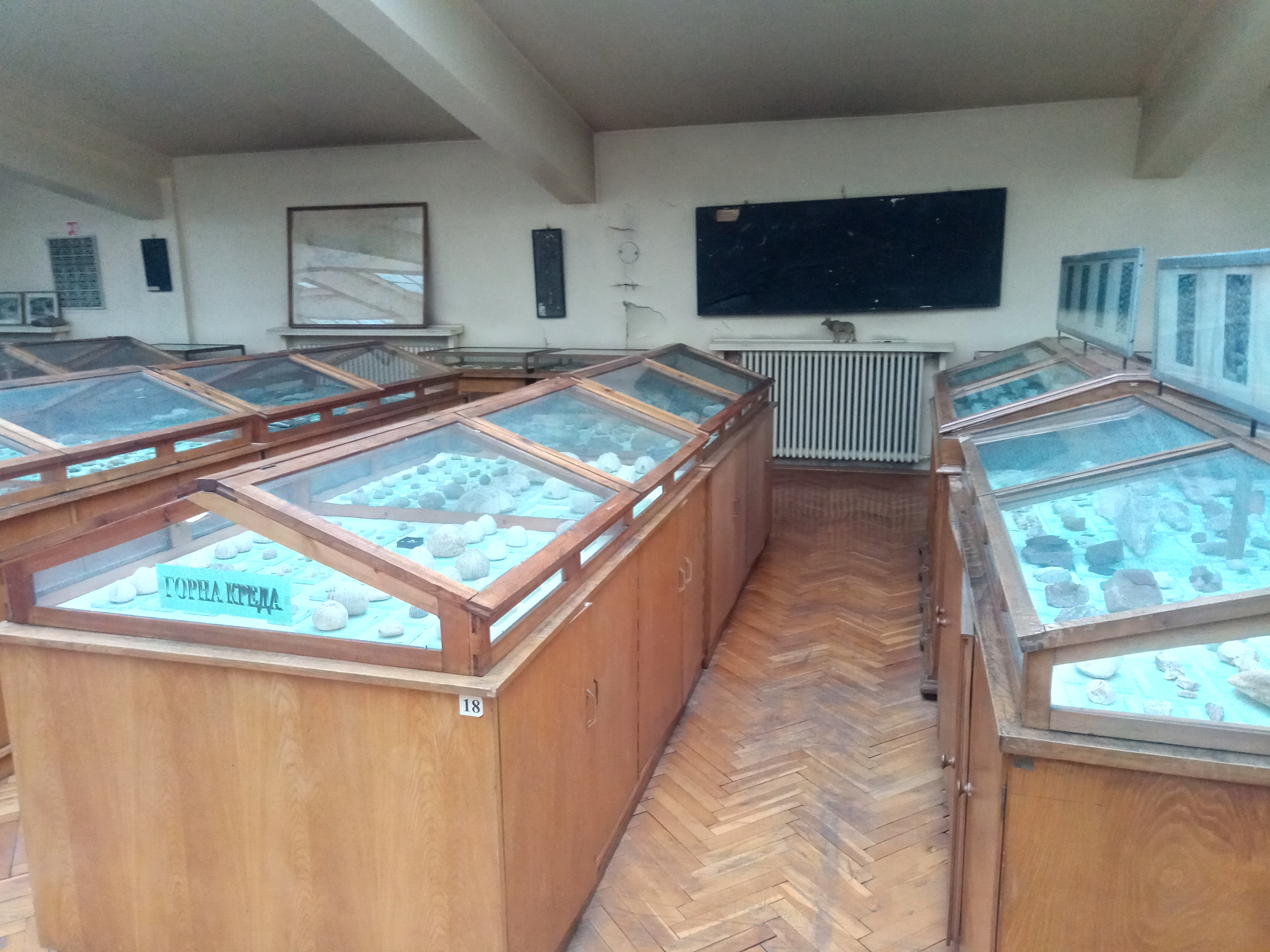
The Upper Cretaceous series/epoch - SUMPHG

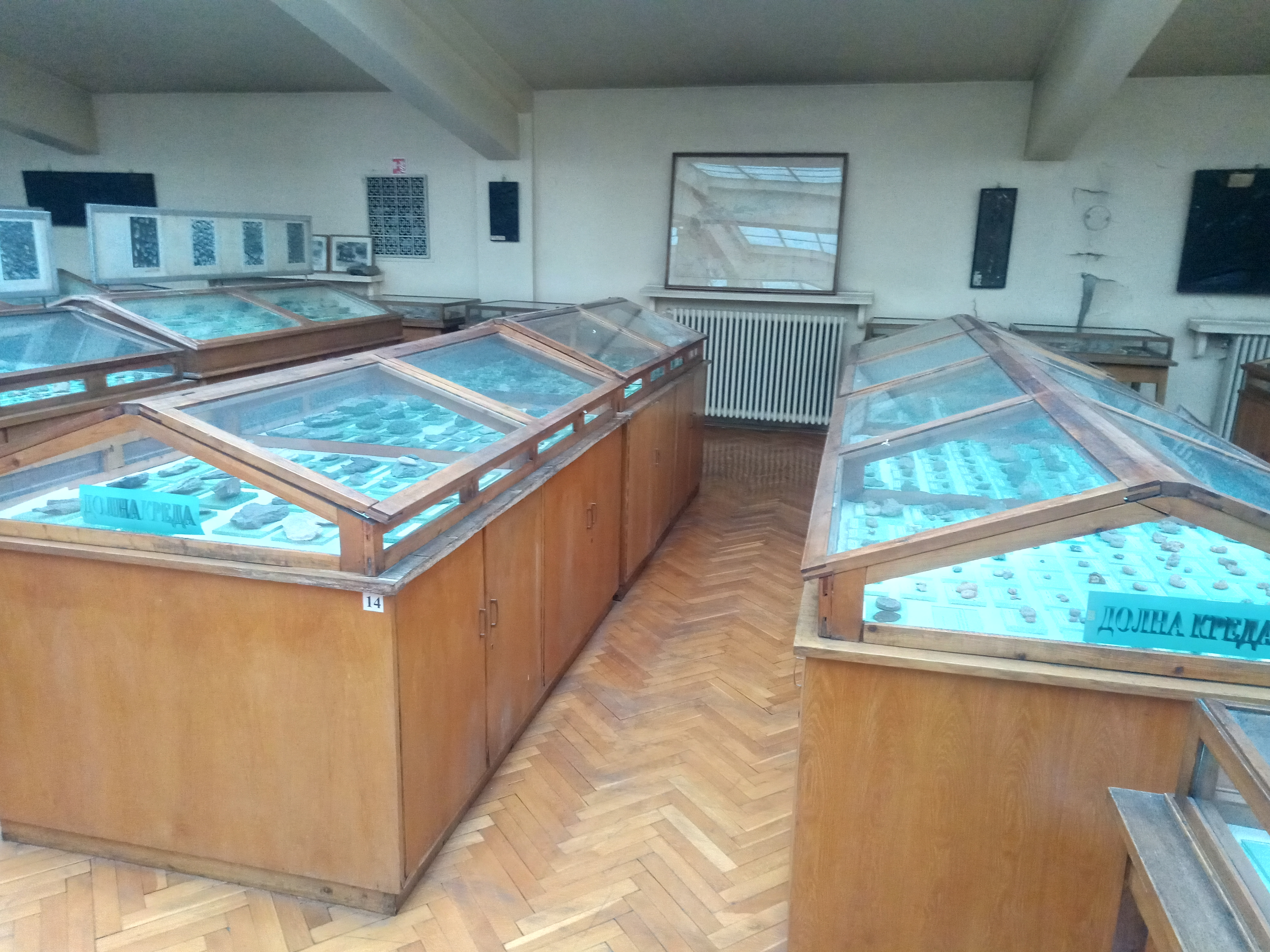
The Lower Cretaceous series/epoch - SUMPHG

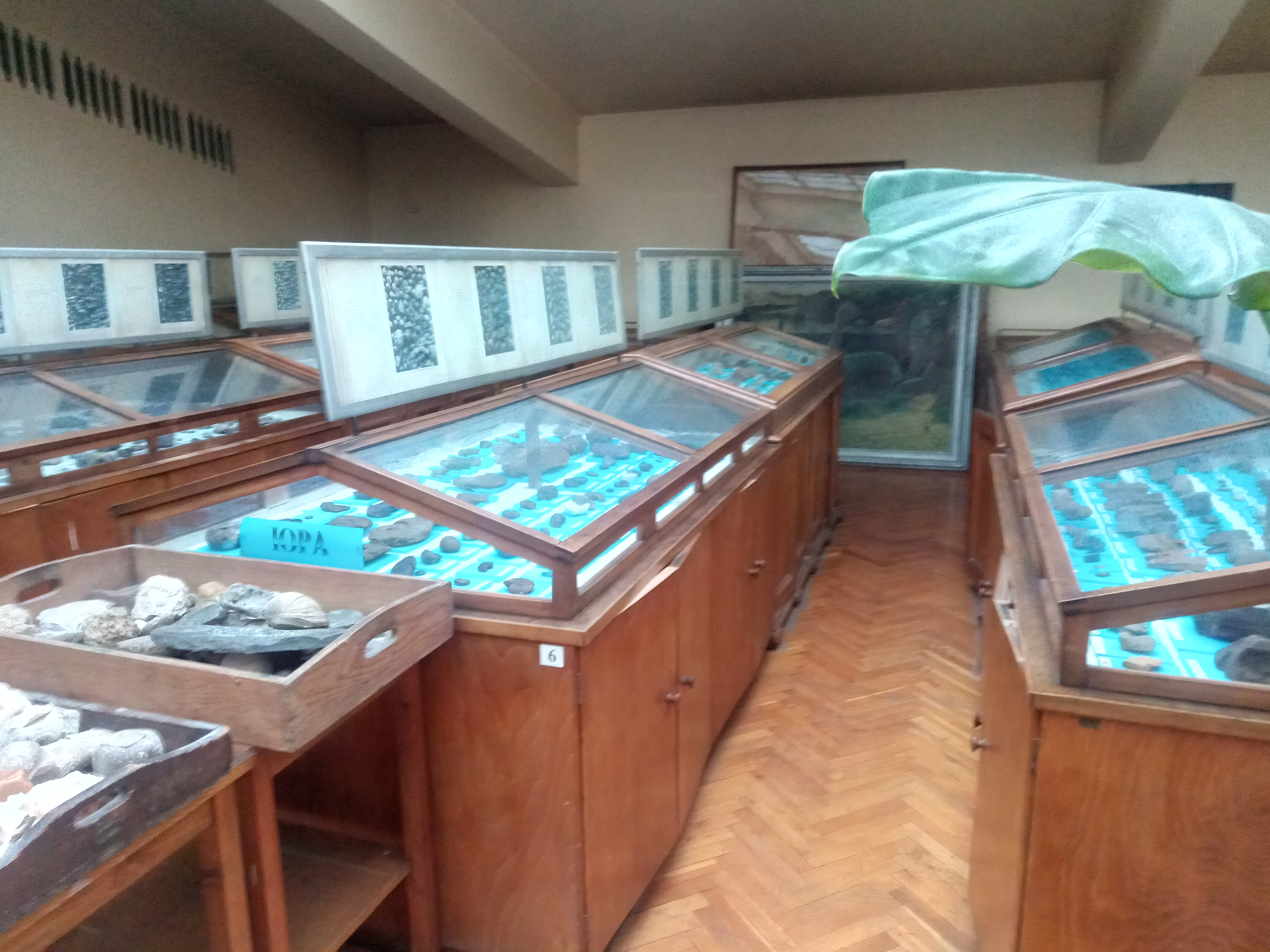
The Jurassic period - SUMPHG

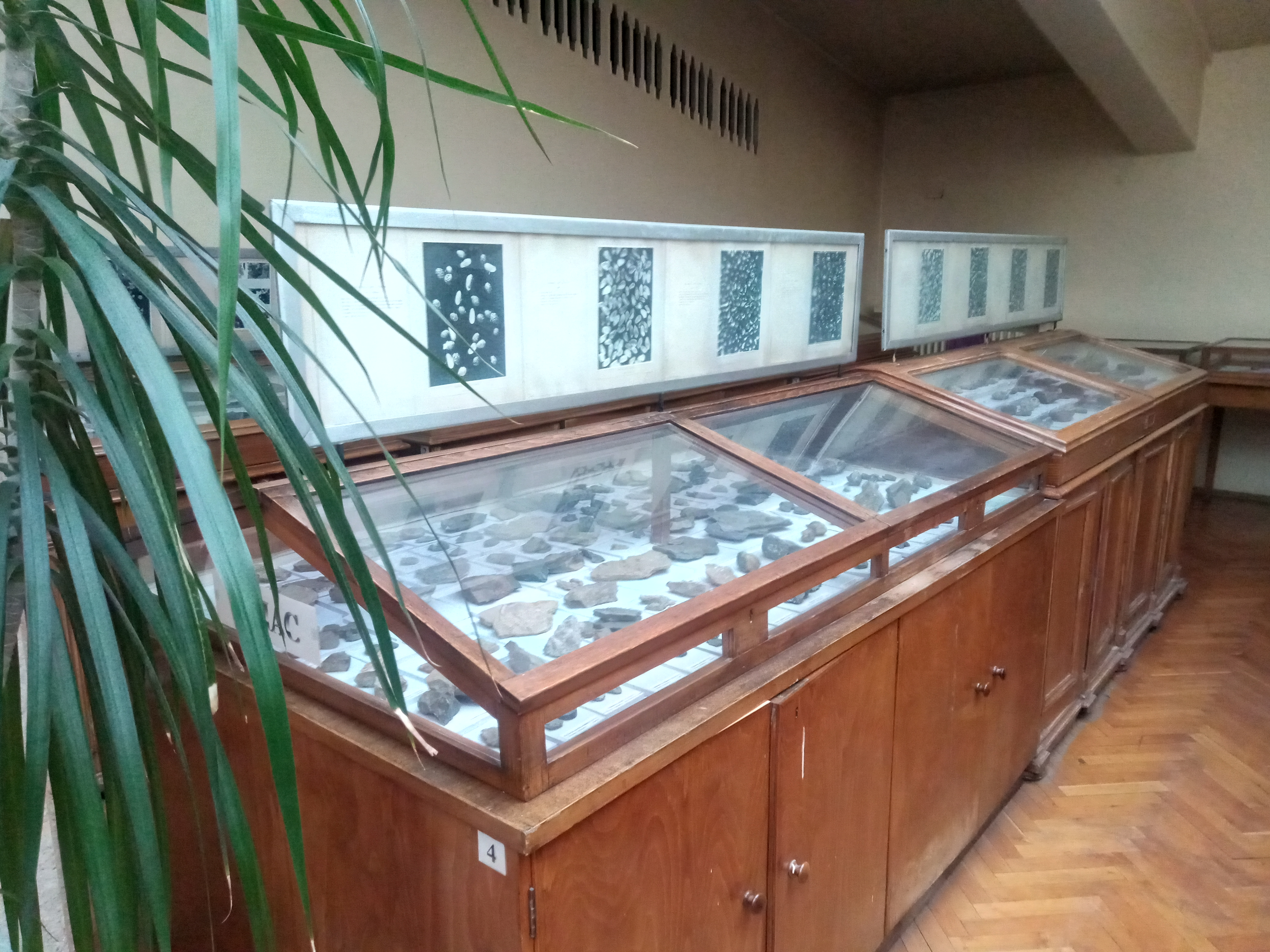
The Triassic period - SUMPHG

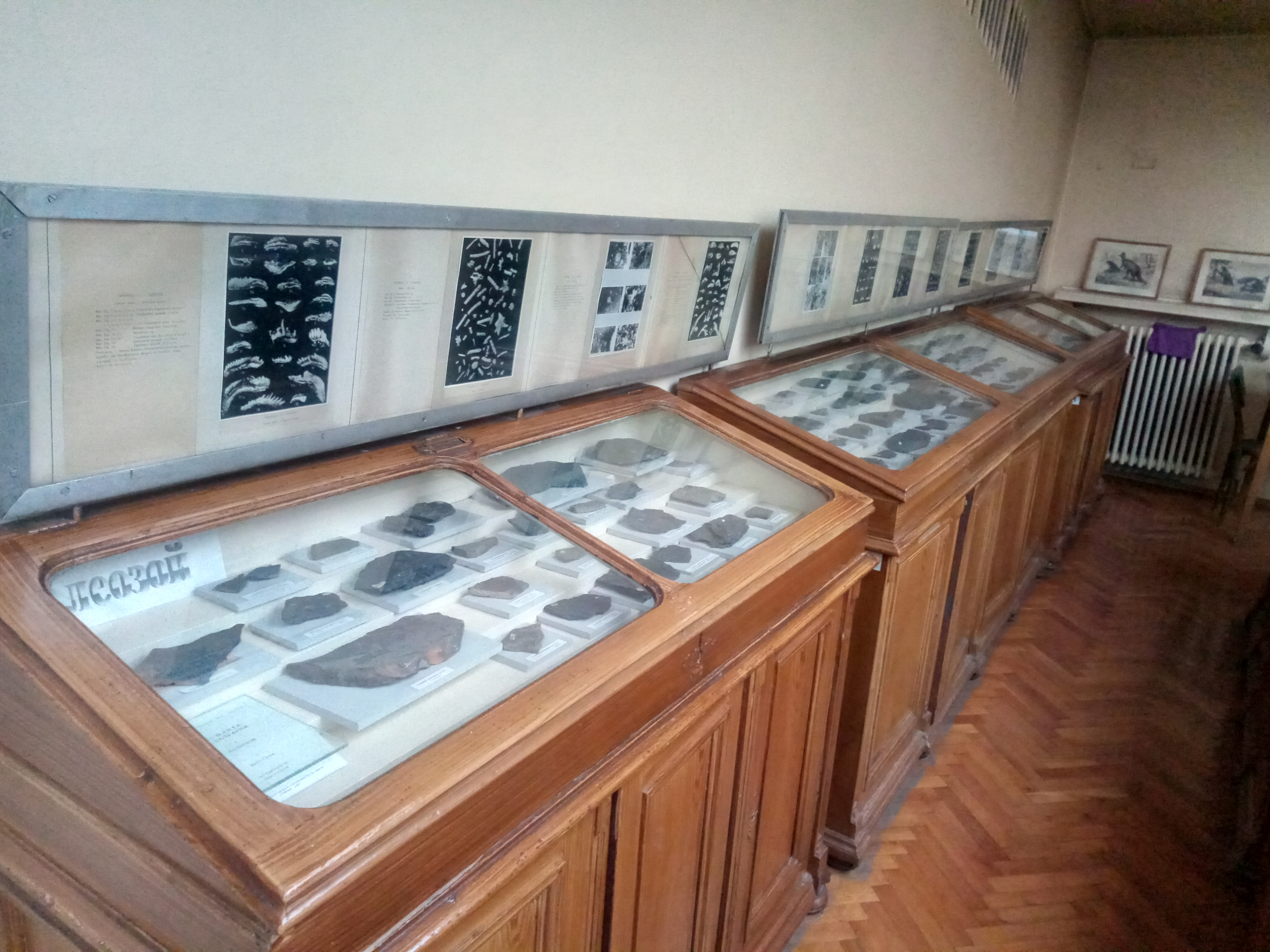
The Paleozoic era - SUMPHG

== See also ==
- Fossil museums
- National Museum of Natural History, Bulgaria
