= Wilfrid Kilian =

French geologist

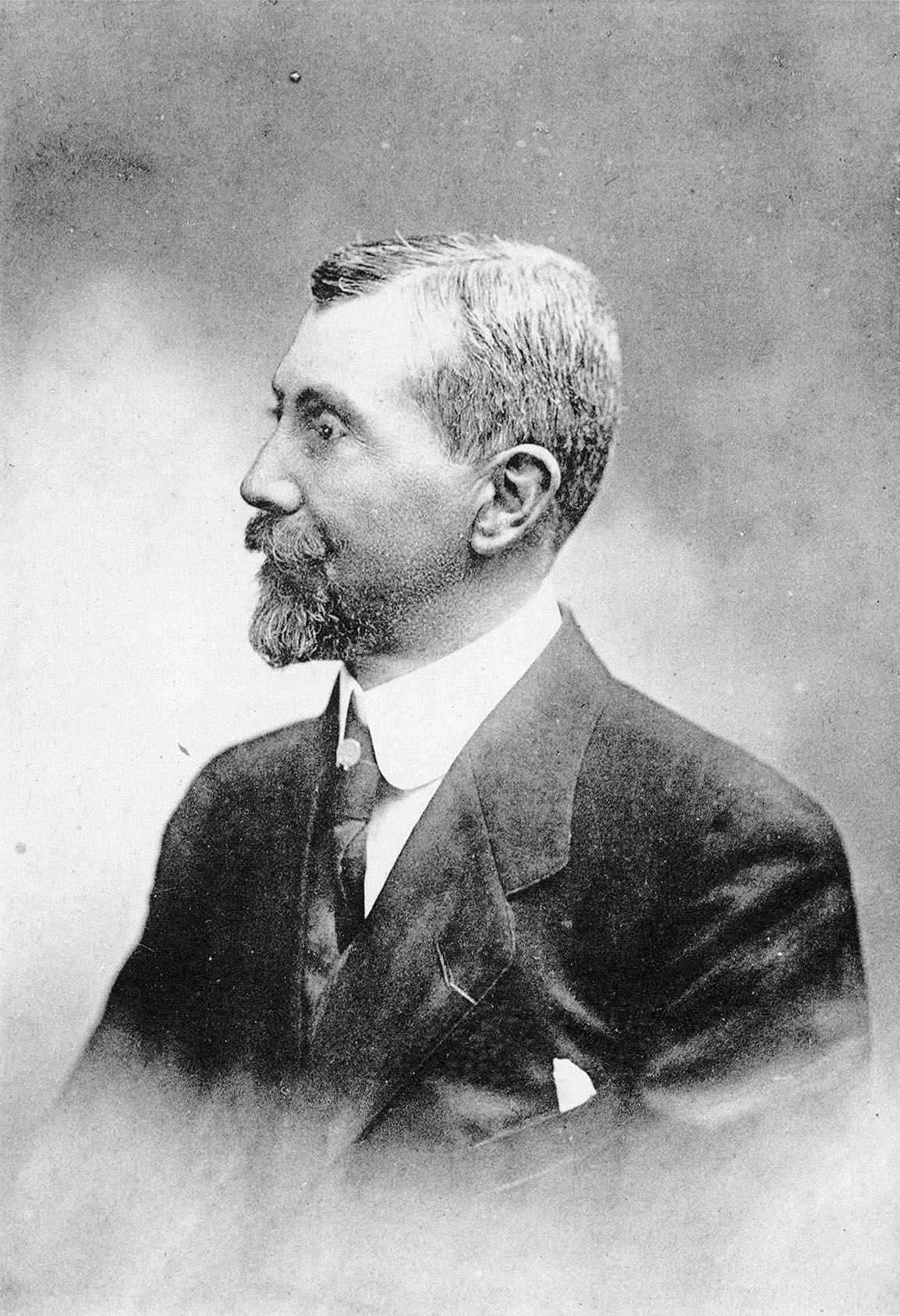
Kilian, c. 1926

Charles Constant Wilfrid Kilian (15 June 1862 - 30 September 1925) was a French geologist, paleontologist, and professor at the University of Grenoble where he was a specialist in Alpine geology. He studied stratigraphy and the oscillations in glaciation.

== Life and work ==
Kilian was born in Schiltigheim in the Alsace region. His father Conrad was a pastor with part Irish ancestry (with an interest in educating deaf-mutes, working for the Boers) and his mother Clémentine was the daughter of Charles Cuvier, a pastor and historian at Strasbourg from the Montbéliard family which included George Cuvier. He was educated at the Protestant Gymnasium, Strasbourg and then the Alsatian School at Paris. He studied geology at the University of Sorbonne, becoming a contemporary and lifelong collaborator of Emile Haug and travelled around Europe, sometimes with Marcel Bertrand, studying the Lure mountains for his 1888 thesis under Edmond Hébert. He collaborated with Marcel Bertrand on the production of a geological map of France. He worked as a lecturer at the University of Clermont-Ferrand but was persuaded by Bertrand to apply for the position of professor of geology at the University of Grenoble in 1892, a position made vacant upon the death of Charles Lory. Kilian had one of the first seismographs installed at Grenoble which recorded from 1892 to 1909. He received the Gaudry gold medal of the French geological society in 1921.

Kilian married Antoinette Boissy d'Anglas in 1894 and they had two daughters, Mathide and Magali; and two sons, Robert, who became a navy officer, and Conrad Kilian who became a geologist and Saharan explorer. Kilian died from an undiagnosed infection. A street in Grenoble and an amphitheater in the University are named in his memory.
