= Stoycho Vassilev Breskovski =

Bulgarian paleontologist

- Стойчо Василев Бресковски
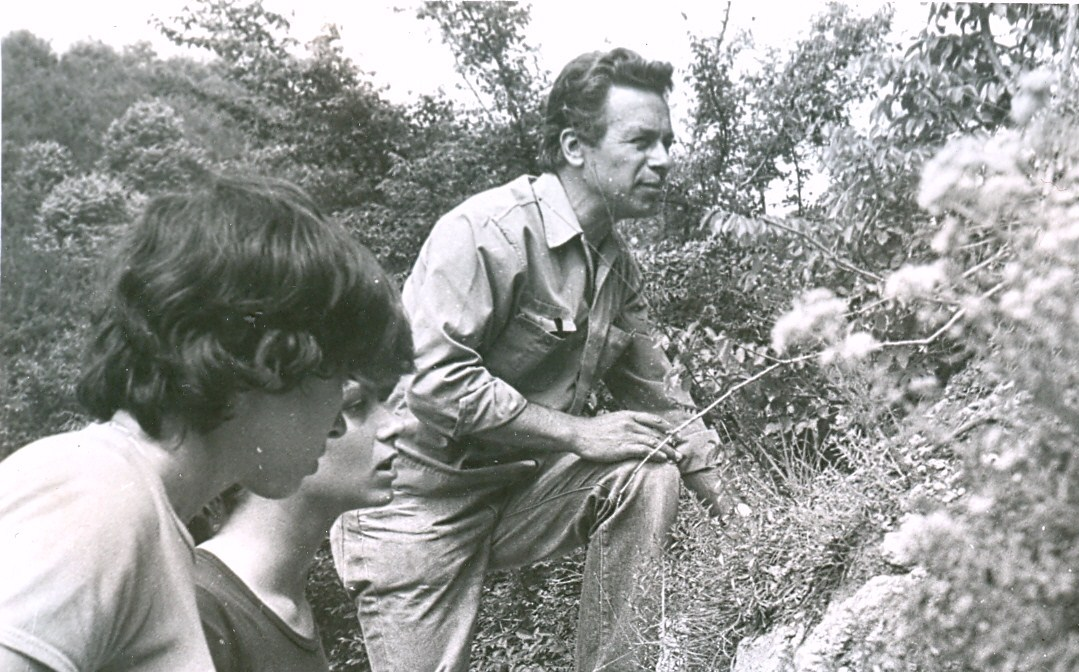
- Dr. Breskovski with students during a fossilling day in 1981. He never considered himself a rock star or a hunter.
- Born: 25 December 1934; Granit, Stara Zagora Province, Bulgaria
- Died: 15 January 2004 (aged 69); Sofia, Republic of Bulgaria
- Resting place: Central Sofia Cemetery; 42°43.074′N 23°19.904′E
- Citizenship: Bulgaria
- Education: Sofia University "St. Kliment Ohridski"
- Spouse: Nonka Lukova Motekova (m. 1962–2004)
- Children: a son and a daughter
- Parent(s): Vassil Stoychev Breskovski (father); Paraskeva (née Nedelcheva Slavova) Breskovska (mother)
- Relatives: Vesselina Breskovska (sister)
- Scientific career
- Fields: Barremian Palaeontology; Stratigraphy
- Workplaces: National Museum of Natural History (Bulgaria); Sofia University "St. Kliment Ohridski"
- Thesis: Биостратиграфия на баремския етаж в част от Североизточна България (An Essay on Biostratigraphy of the Barremian Stage in a Part of Northeastern Bulgaria) (1974)
- Doctoral advisor: Vassil Tzankov
- Author abbrev. (zoology): Breskovski

Stoycho Vassilev Breskovski (Bulgarian: Стойчо Василев Бресковски; December 25, 1934, in Granit, Stara Zagora Province, Bulgaria – January 15, 2004, in Sofia, Bulgaria) was a Bulgarian paleontologist.

== Biography ==
Stoycho Breskovski was the only son of educators Vassil Stoychev Breskovski (1902 - 1978) and Paraskeva (née Nedelcheva Slavova) Breskovska (1906 - 1988). After receiving his primary and secondary education in Plovdiv, he studied geology at Sofia University and graduated in 1958. Then, he took active part in Bulgarian geological survey and in the preparation of the geological map of Bulgaria at scale of 1:200,000. Later Dr. Breskovski was noted for his research on Lower Cretaceous, Barremian fauna. He was also credited for discovering, identifying and discerning several families, subfamilies, genera and species of ammonites.

From 1974 to 1995 Breskovski had been research associate and curator of the paleontology collection at the National Museum of Natural History in Sofia. He contributed to the collections at the natural history museums in the Bulgarian cities of Elena, Rousse, Razgrad, and Shumen. In later age he tried to reconcile his various hobbies of collecting stamps, pocket calendars, phillumeny and philately with science. His older sister, Vesselina Breskovska, was professor of mineralogy, dean and vice rector at Sofia University. He was survived by his wife of 42 years and fellow paleontologist, Nona Motekova, a son and a daughter, a granddaughter and a grandson, and a siamese cat.

== Honors ==
A genus and two species of Lower Cretaceous ammonites bear his name.

== Selected bibliography ==
- Tzankov, V.; S. Breskovski (1985), Ammonites des familles Holcodiscidae Spath, 1924 et Astieridiscidae Tzankov & Breskovski, 1982. II. Description paléontologique, Geologica Balcanica, 15.5, 3-53.
- Tzankov, V.; S. Breskovski (1985), Ammonites des familles Holcodiscidae Spath, 1924 et Astieridiscidae Tzankov & Breskovski, 1982. I. Stratigraphie et notes phylogénétiques, Geologica Balcanica, 15.3, 45-62.
- Tzankov, V.; S. Breskovski (1982), Volume et contenu de la famille Holcodiscidae Spath, 1924, C. R. Acad. Bulg. Sci., 35, 4, 491-93.
- Breskovski, St. (1980), Des genres nouveaux du Crétacé inférieur de la famille Desmoceratidae Zittel, 1895 (Ammonoidea). C. R. Acad. Bulg. Sci., 33, 2; 245-48.
- Breskovski, S. V. (1977). "Sur la classification de la famille Desmoceratidae Zittel, 1895 (Ammonoidea, Crétacé)". C. R. Acad. Bulg. Sci. (in French). 6 (30): 891–4.
- Breskovski, S. V. (1977). "Genres nouveaux du Crétacé inférieur de la famille Desmoceratidae Zittel, 1895 (Ammonoidea)". C. R. Acad. Bulg. Sci. (in French). 30 (10): 1463–65.
- Breskovski, S. (1975). "Les zones et sous-zones ammonitiques dans l'étage Barrémien en Bulgarie du Nord-Est". Geologica Balcanica (in French) (5): 46–66.
- Breskovski, St. (1967). "Eleniceras - genre nouveau d'ammonites hautériviens". Bulgarian Academy of Sciences; Bulletin of the Geological Institute, Series Paleontology (in French). 16: 47–52..
- Nikolov, T.; Breskovski, St. (1969). "Abrytusites – nouveau genre d'ammonites barrémiennes". Bull. Geol. Inst., Ser. Paleontology. 18: 91–96.
- Бресковски, Стойчо (1966). "Биостратиграфия на барема южно от Брестак, Варненско". Трудове по Геологията на България, серия Палеонтология (in Bulgarian). 8: 71–121.
