= List of universities in the United Kingdom by endowment =

The following is a list of British universities ordered by their financial endowments, expressed in pounds sterling at fair value.

British charity funds are made up of restricted reserves, which can only be used for specific purposes, and unrestricted reserves, which could be used for any activity within the charity's scope. The statement of recommended practice (SORP) defines endowments as specific funds with both restrictions over the endowments' income and intention from the donors to establish such endowments. In addition, these reserves must either be held indefinitely and cannot be converted into income without permission (known as permanent endowment funds) or could be converted into income at trustees' discretion (known as expendable endowment). Updated SORP guidance published in 2007 prohibits donations with no specific purpose by the donor (unrestricted) and "with no requirement for maintenance of the original capital" from being treated as endowment. While restrictive funds are not considered endowments under the SORP's accounting guidance, institutions sometimes use the term "endowments" broadly to refer to the sum of all funds that generate income for the institution's operation and activities. Figures listed below account for funds defined by the SORP as endowment.

All sources are official audited financial statements published in the respective fiscal years. Note that changes to the Financial Reporting Standards (FRS 102) and the SORP in 2015 mean endowments as of 2016 are not directly comparable in all cases with those for previous years.

== Endowments over £1 billion ==
Rank	Institution	Endowment (GBP billions, End of Financial Year)										Change		
Rank	Institution	2025	2024	2023	2022	2021	2020	2019	2018	2017	2016	1‑year	5‑year	10‑year
1	University of Oxford (Note: Including the 36 independent and financially autonomous Colleges of the University of Oxford.)	9.278 (Note: Colleges (group) £7,170.0M, University (consolidated) £2,108.3)	8.708 (Note: Colleges (group) £6,795.6M, University (consolidated) £1,912.4M)	8.066 (Note: Colleges (group) £6,387.7M, University (consolidated) £1,678.0M)	8.120 (Note: Colleges (group) £6,418.4M, University (consolidated) £1,701.7M)	7.746 (Note: Colleges (group) £6,126.4M, University (consolidated) £1,619.1M)	6.327 (Note: Colleges (group) £5,036.2M, University (consolidated) £1,291.0M)	6.349 (Note: Colleges (group) £5,132.4M, University (consolidated) £1,217.0M)	6.057 (Note: Colleges (group) £4,896.3M, University (consolidated) £1,160.6M)	5.592 (Note: Colleges (group) £4,602.8M, University (consolidated) £989.4M)	5.069 (Note: Colleges (group) £4,159.1M, University (consolidated) £909.8M)	+6.5%	+46.6%	+83.0%
1	—Excluding Colleges	1.912	1.833	1.602	1.622	1.537	1.221	1.143	1.090	0.921	0.844	+4.3%	+56.6%	+126.5%
2	University of Cambridge (Note: Including the 31 independent and financially autonomous Colleges of the University of Cambridge.)			7.134 (Note: Colleges £4,665M, University (Group) £2,469.1M)	7.802 (Note: Colleges £5,325M, University (Group) £2,476.9M)			6.073 (Note: Colleges £4,101.2M, University (Group) £1,971.3M)	5.044 (Note: Colleges £3,188.2M, University (Group) £1,855.7M)			NA	NA	NA
2	—Excluding Colleges	2.387	2.259	2.119	2.123	2.031	1.648	1.674	1.562	1.449	1.269	+5.7%	+44.8%	+88.1%

== Endowments from £100 million to £1 billion ==
Rank	Institution	Endowment (GBP millions, End of Financial Year)										Change		
Rank	Institution	2025	2024	2023	2022	2021	2020	2019	2018	2017	2016	1‑year	5‑year	10‑year
3	University of Edinburgh	604.8	580.4	559.8	541.0	565.2	487.7	459.9	424.1	392.1	342.8	+4.2%	+7.0%	+76.4%
4	King's College London	340.8	324.8	301.0	291.1	300.6	252.2	258.1	233.5	213.5	194.1	+4.9%	+35.1%	+75.6%
5	University of Glasgow	283.1	262.4	234.3	225.8	225.2	177.2	201.9	200.6	188.4	170.9	+7.9%	+25.7%	+50.3%
6	London School of Economics	276.1	255.5	229.3	229.4	240.8	198.4	155.0	141.6	132.7	119.2	+8.1%	+39.2%	+131.6%
7	Imperial College London	272.4	235.2	220.1	219.6	202.1	176.0	178.1	157.1	141.7	126.2	+15.8%	+54.8%	+115.8%
8	University of Manchester	248.7	240.2	221.6	223.5	242.2	220.5	238.4	235.1	222.2	196.8	+3.5%	+12.8%	+26.4%
9	University of Liverpool	202.9	193.8	182.7	184.4	190.2	168.3	171.7	167.1	166.5	155.8	+4.7%	+20.6%	+30.2%
10	University College London	175.0	174.8	156.8	158.8	163.3	143.2	138.7	118.0	111.4	101.0	+0.1%	+22.2%	+73.3%
11	University of Birmingham	153.7	155.8	142.5	138.0	134.5	116.7	121.6	120.3	112.6	103.8	−1.3%	+31.7%	+48.1%
12	University of Reading (Note: During the 2020–21 year, Reading applied for and was granted permission from the Charity Commission to close the Research Endowment Trust. As a result, all of the trust’s assets and liabilities were distributed to the University, the sole Trustee.)	141.3	142.6	133.6	102.8	107.4	250.7	17.5	14.7	14.0	14.8	−0.9%	−43.6%	+854.7%
13	University of St Andrews	139.9	125.9	114.9	113.1	117.7	95.6	89.9	77.8	69.4	58.6	+11.1%	+46.3%	+138.7%
14	Durham University (Note: Excluding the two independent colleges of Durham: St Chad's and St John's.)	116.3	106.6	101.7	99.4	98.2	86.4	81.9	74.0	72.0	67.6	+9.1%	+34.6%	+72.0%

== Endowments from £10 million to £100 million ==
Rank	Institution	Endowment (GBP millions, End of Financial Year)										Change		
Rank	Institution	2025	2024	2023	2022	2021	2020	2019	2018	2017	2016	1‑year	5‑year	10‑year
15	Newcastle University	98.3	94.8	87.1	87.6	101.8	87.2	85.1	80.6	75.2	63.4	+3.7%	+12.7%	+55.0%
16	University of Leeds	95.9	94.8	83.2	87.4	90.5	82.1	82.3	77.2	72.7	67.7	+1.2%	+16.8%	+41.7%
17	University of Bristol	94.6	98.7	86.1	91.6	91.3	78.7	77.2	72.2	70.2	62.6	−4.2%	+20.2%	+51.1%
18	University of Nottingham	82.5	78.1	72.5	72.2	72.3	62.3	63.0	58.5	55.1	49.9	+5.6%	+32.4%	+65.3%
19	Queen's University Belfast	75.0	70.9	65.6	69.0	69.7	63.8	67.1	67.1	65.4	56.6	+5.8%	+17.6%	+32.5%
20	Royal Holloway, University of London	74.8	75.5	81.6	86.1	87.7	78.8	81.2	80.4	79.6	75.3	−0.9%	−5.1%	−0.7%
21	University of Aberdeen	70.5	65.3	58.6	58.1	58.4	51.9	52.0	49.7	46.9	41.3	+8.0%	+35.8%	+70.7%
22	SOAS University of London	60.1	57.1	53.9	54.8	56.2	49.3	51.2	47.0	42.2	39.0	+5.3%	+21.9%	+54.1%
23	University of Sheffield	59.0	55.2	47.1	46.5	46.7	45.5	46.0	43.8	42.2	39.7	+6.9%	+29.7%	+48.6%
24	University of Exeter	53.8	51.6	48.6	48.7	49.5	41.5	40.7	38.2	37.2	32.5	+4.3%	+29.6%	+65.5%
25	Cardiff University	53.5	53.1	46.2	45.6	45.5	38.9	38.2	34.5	33.1	30.3	+0.8%	+37.5%	+76.6%
26	University of Strathclyde	49.9	46.6	42.2	41.7	42.1	36.3	37.8	35.1	33.1	30.9	+7.1%	+18.5%	+61.5%
27	Queen Mary University of London	49.7	48.0	43.7	43.4	41.3	37.3	33.4	34.1	34.3	34.7	+3.5%	+33.2%	+43.2%
28	University of Dundee		37.2	34.4	33.9	35.0	30.2	31.3	29.6	28.3	25.8	NA	NA	NA
29	Aberystwyth University	33.1	36.4	33.5	30.3	30.9	35.6	36.6	43.3	57.7	48.4	−9.1%	−7.0%	−31.6%
30	University of Leicester	24.3	25.9	23.6	24.3	24.5	20.0	21.0	20.6	17.7	14.0	−6.2%	+21.5%	+73.6%
31	University of Sussex	21.9	21.1	16.4	15.3	17.9	14.4	13.6	11.6	11.0	10.1	+3.8%	+52.1%	+116.8%
32	Lancaster University	19.5	18.9	18.4	15.0	14.8	14.3	13.9	6.0	5.9	5.6	+3.2%	+36.4%	+248.2%
33	Goldsmiths, University of London	18.2	15.7	15.0	15.1	15.3	14.9	15.0	3.3	3.3	3.1	+15.9%	+22.1%	+487.1%
34	Nottingham Trent University	17.3	16.8	15.6	4.7	4.8	5.0	5.2	5.6	6.3	6.9	+3.0%	+246.0%	+150.7%
35	Ulster University	17.2	16.0	15.0	15.4	16.1	13.9	15.1	14.4	9.0	7.4	+7.5%	+23.7%	+132.4%
36	University of East Anglia	16.2	15.6	13.7	13.2	12.9	10.5	9.0	8.2	7.7	7.3	+3.8%	+54.3%	+121.9%
37	University of Hull	15.6	15.8	14.9	15.2	15.8	14.6	15.2	14.6	14.4	18.8	−1.3%	+6.8%	−17.0%
38	Birmingham City University	14.8	14.2	12.2	11.9	11.8	10.2	8.1	6.6	6.2	5.7	+4.2%	+45.1%	+159.6%
39	Heriot-Watt University	13.2	13.2	12.2	12.4	12.0	10.5	10.5	9.6	8.9	8.3	0.0%	+25.7%	+59.0%
40	University of Southampton	12.8	12.4	11.9	12.8	14.9	12.9	13.0	13.1	12.9	12.5	+3.2%	−0.8%	+2.4%
41	City St George's, University of London (Note: Created from the merger of City and St George's in 2024.)	11.4	7.7									+48.1%	NA	NA

== Specialist Higher Education Institutions ==
Rank	Institution	Endowment (GBP millions, End of Financial Year)										Change		
Rank	Institution	2025	2024	2023	2022	2021	2020	2019	2018	2017	2016	1‑year	5‑year	10‑year
1	London Business School	78.5	69.6	62.4	60.3	57.9	59.5	56.5	53.3	51.9	47.7	+12.8%	+31.9%	+64.6%
2	Royal Academy of Music	64.3	68.5	58.3	53.0	48.8	36.4	38.1	39.5	36.5	33.8	−6.1%	+76.6%	+90.2%
4	Royal College of Music	52.9	47.9	44.3	44.6	49.3	42.4	45.6	42.8	37.8	36.5	+10.4%	+24.8%	+44.9%
4	Courtauld Institute of Art	47.8	41.7	38.7	36.0	35.7	44.4	44.9	39.7	37.6	34.4	+14.6%	+7.7%	+39.0%
5	Liverpool School of Tropical Medicine	47.7	48.3	25.6	19.1	27.6	24.9	17.5	17.0	16.3	14.9	−1.2%	+91.6%	+220.1%
6	Royal College of Art	39.6	38.5	34.0	28.5	26.7	22.3	21.3	20.3	20.1	19.5	+2.9%	+77.6%	+103.1%
7	Royal Northern College of Music	23.3	22.5	20.3	21.1	21.7	18.6	18.9	17.5	21.2	19.3	+3.6%	+25.3%	+20.7%
8	London School of Hygiene & Tropical Medicine	20.0	19.7	18.1	18.5	20.6	17.5	16.1	14.3	13.3	11.4	+1.5%	+14.3%	+75.4%
9	Royal Veterinary College	11.5	11.7	10.7	10.7	10.5	8.7	9.1	9.2	9.8	9.8	−1.7%	+32.2%	+17.3%

== Endowments per student greater than £10,000 ==
Rank	Institution	Enrolment (FTE - 2024/25)	Endowment per student (2025, student population over 1000)	Change (1‑year)
1	University of Cambridge^{†}	21,040	£113,450	+6.2%
2	University of Oxford^{†}	21,840	£87,546	+5.8%
3	London Business School	1,705	£46,041	+11.5%
4	London School of Economics	12,590	£21,930	+6.7%
5	University of Edinburgh	36,185	£16,714	+4.4%
6	Royal College of Art	2,460	£16,098	+14.6%
7	University of St Andrews	10,800	£12,954	+11.7%
8	Imperial College London	21,310	£12,783	+15.6%
9	SOAS University of London	5,990	£10,033	+2.3%

Notes:
^{†} Excluding the endowments of the autonomous colleges

== See also ==
- Armorial of UK universities
- List of universities in the United Kingdom
- List of UK universities by date of foundation
- List of universities in the United Kingdom by enrolment
- Lists of institutions of higher education by endowment size
