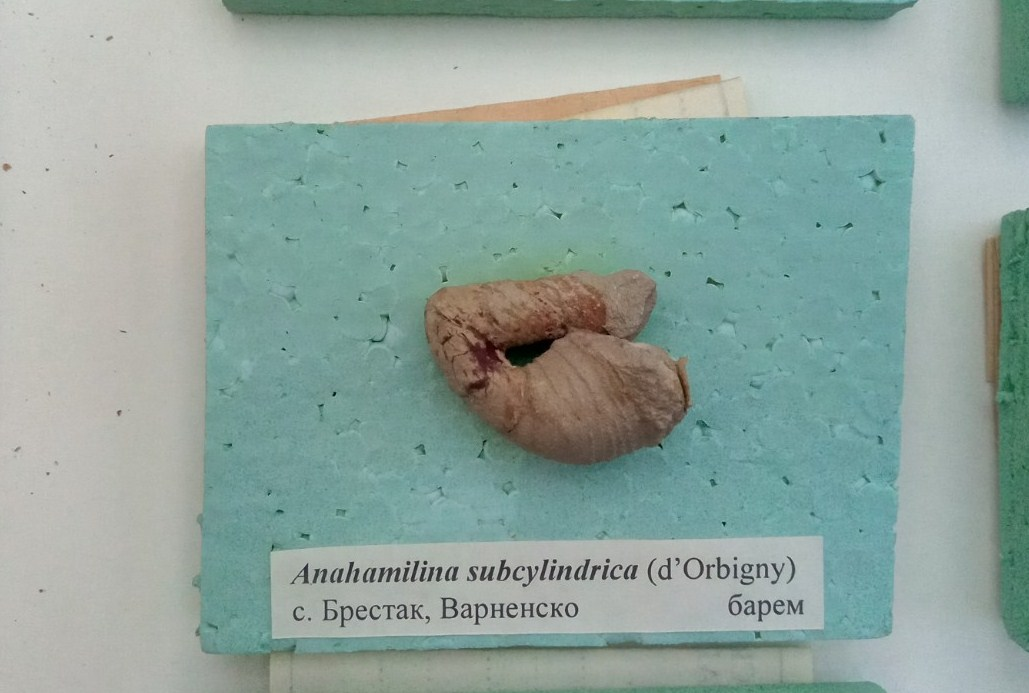
- Anahamulina subcylindrica, Lower Barremian, Brestak, (Coll. St. Breskovski) at the Sofia University Museum of Paleontology and Historical Geology

Scientific classification
- Kingdom: Animalia
- Phylum: Mollusca
- Class: Cephalopoda
- Subclass: †Ammonoidea
- Order: †Ammonitida
- Suborder: †Ancyloceratina
- Family: †Hamulinidae
- Genus: †Anahamulina; Hyatt, 1900

Species
- See text

= Anahamulina =

Anahamulina Temporal range: Hauterivian–Barremian

Genus of molluscs (fossil)

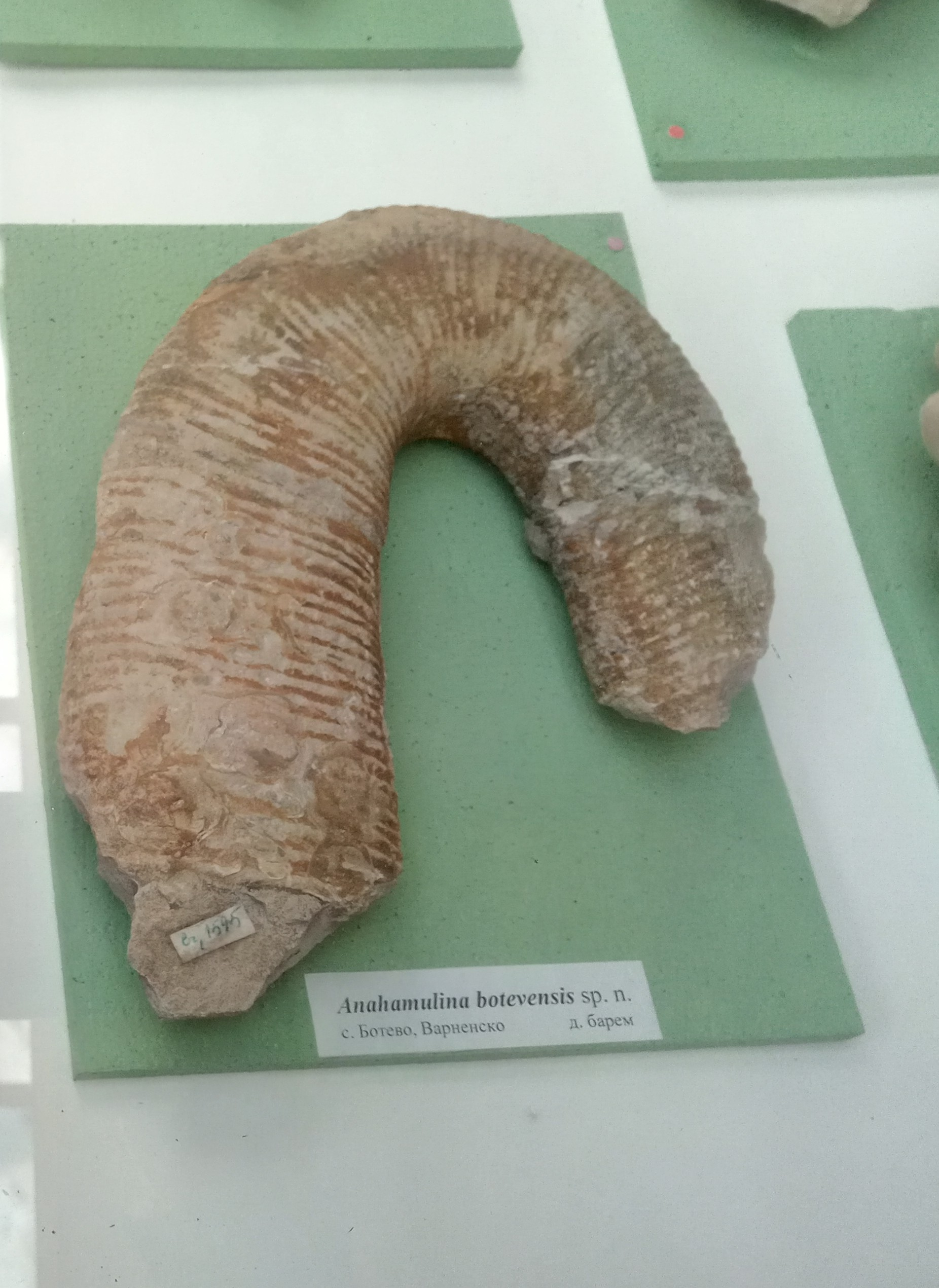
Anahamulina botevensis sp. n., Lower Barremian, Botevo, Varna Province, Cr1 1595X1 at the SUMPHG

Anahamulina is an extinct ammonoid cephalopod genus from the Lower Cretaceous. Named by Hyatt, 1900.

== Description ==
Anahamulina is characterized by an increasingly wide shaft that bends sharply to the opposite direction, at some point ending in a shorter terminal section. The two sections are not in lateral contact. The first, and earlier, shaft has fine, dense, oblique ribs, which in the second, and later, shaft are stronger and more radial.

Two species are recognized. The type Anahamulina subcylindrica, named by Hyatt, 1900, is based on Hamulina subcylindrica d'Orbigny 1850.

== Distribution ==
It is found in Europe and Japan. Anahamulina wilcoxensis named by Imlay, 1960, is known from California and Oregon.
