= Zay Initiative =

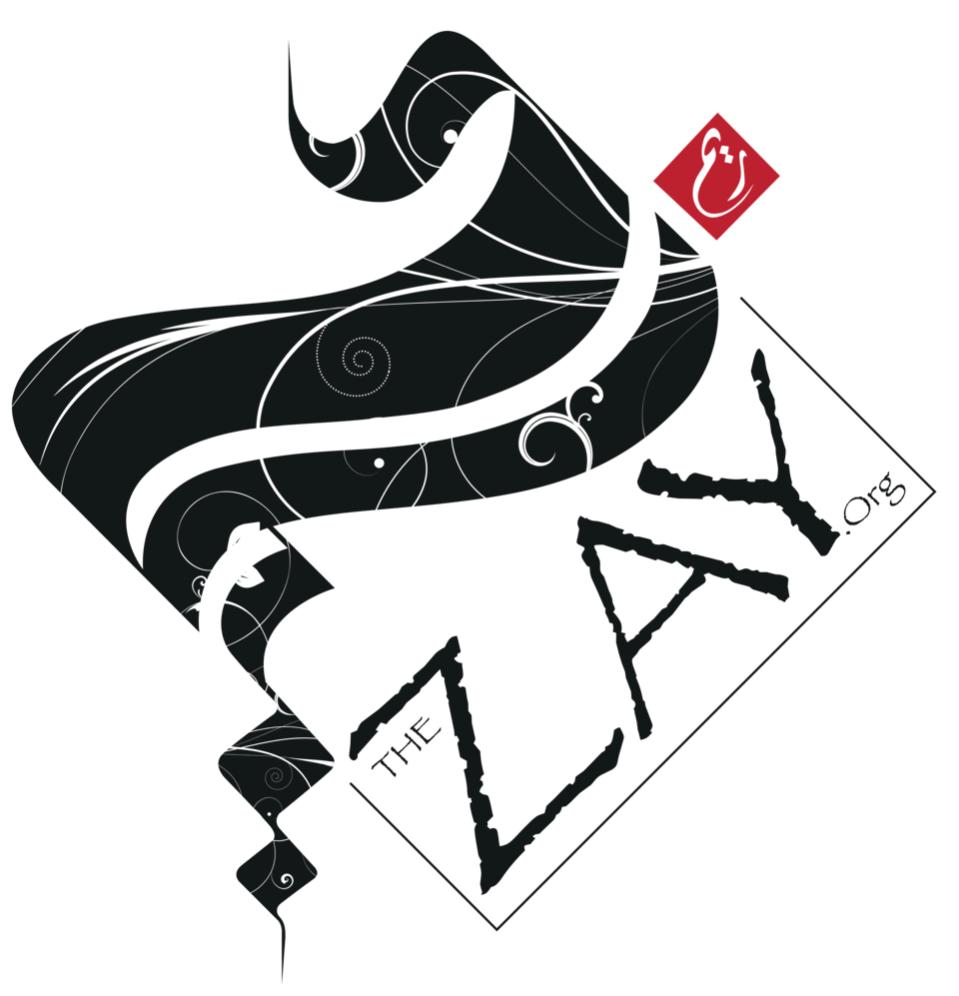
- Formation: 2019
- Type: nonprofit
- Headquarters: London, UK
- Key people: Reem El Mutwall (Founder)
- Website: thezay.org

The Zay Initiative (Arabic: مبادرة زِيّ) is a non-profit UK registered fashion Digital library and collection archive. The Zay Initiative, founded in 2019, owns and manages the world-first Arab dress-history archive.

The word ‘Zay’ means ‘Dress’ in Arabic.

== Background ==
The Zay Initiative is a non-profit, UK registered initiative, advancing the preservation of both the tangible and intangible cultural heritage through the collection, documentation, and digital archiving of Arab historical attire and their stories. Through their work, events, and collection, they help sustain global cross-cultural dialogue. It was founded in 2018 by Reem El Mutwall.

=== The Collection ===
The constantly growing collection is a contextualization of over 1500 costumes and objects of adornment from the Arab world extending through the Silk Road and dating back to 1800s. A growing collection of Arab dress and adornment celebrating human narrative. The core of the collection is based on UAE traditional dress, with additional key examples from Yemen, Morocco, Kuwait, Iraq, Syria, Tunisia, Egypt, Bahrain, Qatar, Oman, Saudi Arabia, and other Arab cultures. The Zay Initiative is focused on growing a traditional dress collection with examples from across the Arab world alongside relevant pieces from Iran, India, China, Ottoman Turkey and elsewhere that highlight the exchange of historical influence along the Silk Road.

=== Mission ===
The Zay Initiative aims to collect, document and conserve Arab dress and adornment and promote an understanding of the evolution of regional culture. In summary, the Five Pillars of the Zay Initiative are:

- Collect, document and conserve Arab dress and adornment.
- Present and contextualise through a digital archive and blog.
- Encourage intercultural dialogue to highlight shared humanity.
- Inspire and educate designers to create for a sustainable future.
- Empower women regionally and globally by bringing their untold stories to life.

=== Sustainable Development Goals (SDGs) ===
The Zay Initiative is committed to The UN's 17 Global Goals for Sustainable Development - agreed by 193 government entities worldwide - that aim to bring about an improved standard of living to all people by 2030. The Zay Initiative closely align with:

- 4) Quality Education
- 5) Gender Equality
- 11) Sustainable Cities and Communities
- 16) Peace, Justice, and Strong Institutions
