= Lists of institutions of higher education by endowment size =

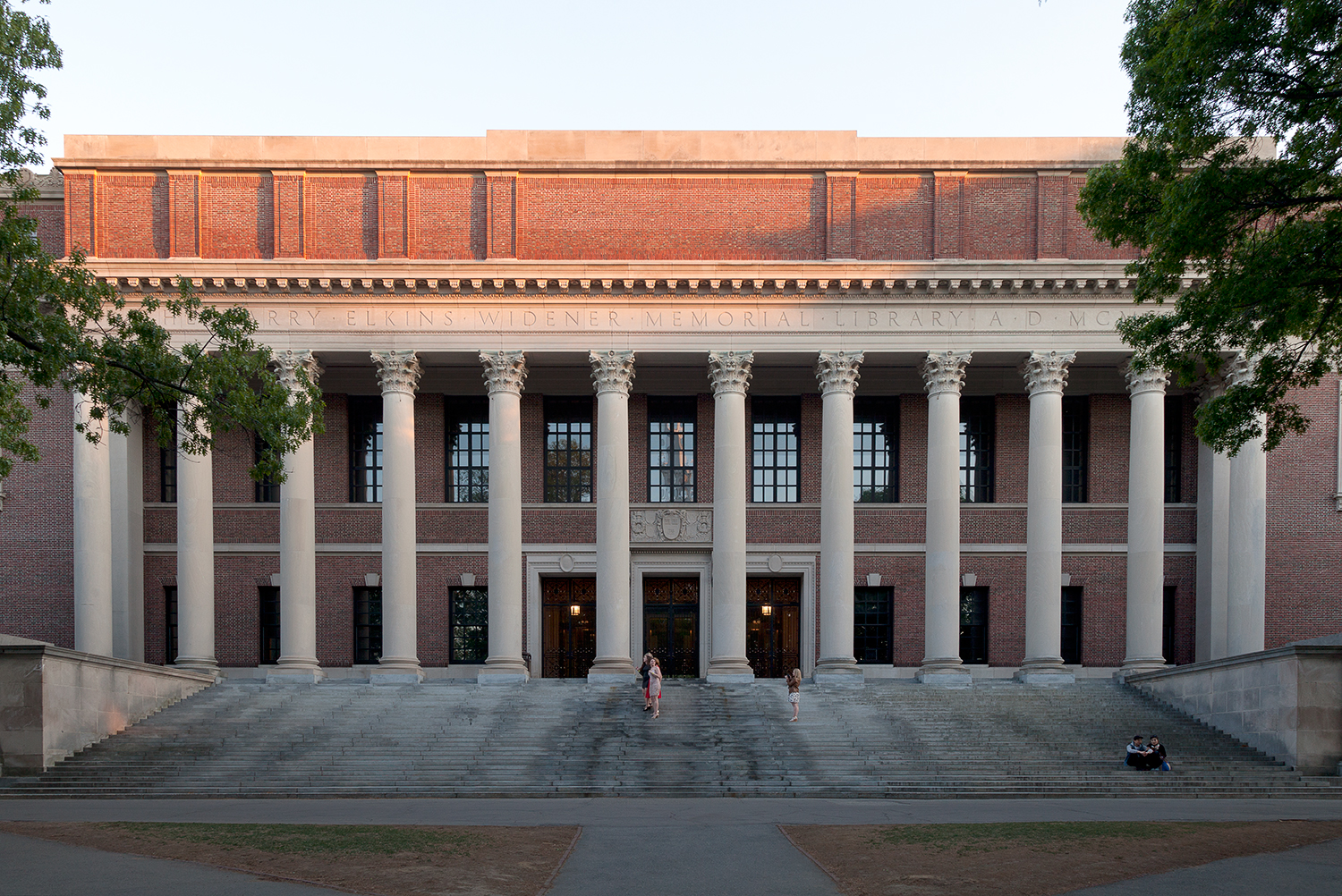
Harvard University, with a $55 billion endowment as of 2025, is the wealthiest university in the world.

The following are lists of institutions of higher education by endowment size.

== Africa ==
- List of South African universities by endowment

== Americas ==
- List of Canadian universities by endowment
- List of colleges and universities in the United States by endowment

== Europe ==
- List of universities in the United Kingdom by endowment
