= List of Canadian universities by endowment =

This list of Canadian universities by endowment groups the universities in Canada according to their endowments. As of the end of the 2024/2025 fiscal year, the total value of endowments at Canadian universities was almost $26 billion.

Some universities do not have endowments while the largest endowment for a single university - the University of Toronto - is over $4 billion.

Mount Allison University has the largest endowment per student of non-federated Canadian universities and the second largest endowment per student of all Canadian universities after Victoria University, federated with the University of Toronto, reaching over $107k per student as of December 31, 2021. Mount Allison has significantly larger endowments than the average Canadian and Atlantic Canadian primarily undergraduate university.

The following are the Canadian universities with financial endowments over $1 billion, expressed in Canadian dollars at fair value. All sources are official audited financial statements published in the respective fiscal years. As a collegiate university, the University of Toronto reports its financial and endowment information exclusive of its colleges, which hold additional endowments of their own.

== Endowments over C$1 billion ==
Canadian universities by endowment (billions of Canadian dollars)
| Institution | 2025/26 | 2024/25 | 2023/24 | 2022/23 | 2021/22 |
|---|---|---|---|---|---|
| University of Toronto (Note: Endowments for the University of Toronto's federated universities not included in figures.) | $4.480 | $3.933 | $3.616 | $3.267 | $3.167 |
| University of British Columbia | $2.907 | $2.641 | $2.336 | $2.123 | $2.104 |
| McGill University | $2.487 | $2.136 | $1.977 | $1.822 | $1.739 |
| University of Alberta | $2.091 | $1.912 | $1.815 | $1.728 | $1.639 |
| Queen's University at Kingston | $2.170 | $1.717 | $1.597 | $1.448 | $1.407 |
| University of Calgary | $1.719 | $1.540 | $1.316 | $1.176 | $1.162 |
| University of Western Ontario | $1.632 | $1.426 | $1.296 | $1.141 | $1.046 |

== Endowments C$250 million to C$1 billion ==
Canadian universities by endowment (millions of Canadian dollars)
| Institution | 2025/26 | 2024/25 | 2023/24 | 2022/23 | 2021/22 |
|---|---|---|---|---|---|
| University of Manitoba | $806.271 | $739.335 | $675.969 | $619.983 | $600.213 |
| McMaster University | $798.995 | $882.314 | $815.1 | $750.5 | $704.994 |
| Dalhousie University | $783.313 | $753.271 | $707.191 | $681.497 | $597.593 |
| York University | $699.663 | $661.612 | $607.792 | $566.712 | $533.567 |
| University of Guelph | $665.3 | $536.816 | $486.113 | $445.165 | $411.6 |
| University of Saskatchewan | $649.432 | $536.905 | $509.173 | $475.371 | $462.817 |
| Université de Montréal | $615.573 | $530.672 | $469.157 | $428.951 | $403.054 |
| Simon Fraser University | $578.413 | $557.498 | $520.4 | $485.471 | $470.610 |
| University of Waterloo | $631.801 | $565.462 | $524.827 | $492.010 | $464.677 |
| University of Victoria | $489.871 | $470.829 | $455.457 | $436.144 | $418.237 |
| Carleton University | $479.032 | $401.181 | $370.157 | $361.423 | $343.266 |
| University of Ottawa | $382.196 | $361.952 | $350.738 | $333.880 | $321.301 |
| Mount Allison University | $303.672 | $244.737 | $235.698 | $220.585 | $215.1 |
| University of New Brunswick | $289.823 | $276.505 | $259.864 | $238.328 | $215.945 |
| Saint Francis Xavier University | $272.863 | $227.766 | $207.184 | $182.539 | $185.261 |

== Endowments less than C$250 million ==
Canadian universities by endowment (millions of Canadian dollars)
| Institution | 2025/26 | 2024/25 | 2023/24 | 2022/23 | 2021/22 |
|---|---|---|---|---|---|
| Laval University | $248.214 | $237.424 | $224.497 | $199.944 | $34.679 |
| Memorial University of Newfoundland | $216.007 | $197.468 | $177.960 | $158.794 | $156.119 |
| Toronto Metropolitan University | $174.224 | $169.473 | $162.661 | $155.492 | $148.873 |
| Concordia University | | $172.167 | $158.623 | $142.530 | $139.068 |
| University of Windsor | | $165.228 | $151.903 | $139.776 | $140.486 |
| Acadia University | $164.612 | $146.296 | $133.599 | $120.130 | $117.538 |
| Wilfrid Laurier University | $136.707 | $129.213 | $120.539 | $113.943 | $107.752 |
| Brock University | | $132.011 | $130.145 | $122.332 | $119.025 |
| University of Lethbridge | $112.816 | $109.910 | $104.301 | $94.892 | $94.499 |
| Trent University | | $108.712 | $102.312 | $95.119 | $86.909 |
| Mount Royal University | $101.488 | $91.700 | $76.339 | $78.043 | $76.966 |
| University of Regina | $80.855 | $71.299 | $64.115 | $60.490 | $59.316 |
| University of Northern British Columbia | | $75.591 | $73.119 | $71.871 | $69.464 |
| University of Prince Edward Island | $72.316 | $69.066 | $66.049 | $60.134 | $54.133 |
| Saint Mary's University | $65.365 | $61.110 | $54.511 | $53.266 | $58.300 |
| Lakehead University | | $62.393 | $58.650 | $68.626 | $64.417 |
| Trinity Western University | $56.434 | $47.712 | $41.641 | $36.953 | $33.578 |
| Laurentian University | | $52.527 | $49.614 | $47.510 | $60.961 |
| Mount Saint Vincent University | $45.569 | $44.674 | $39.410 | $36.537 | $36.221 |
| Ontario College of Art and Design University | $27.202 | $23.618 | $21.872 | $19.572 | $19.896 |
| Nipissing University | $16.513 | $14.968 | $12.859 | $12.702 | $12.326 |
| Redeemer University College | $10.229 | $7.206 | $6.608 | $6.201 | $6.220 |
| Algoma University | $4.435 | $4.091 | $3.909 | $3.878 | $3.660 |

== See also ==
- Lists of institutions of higher education by endowment size
- U15 Group of Canadian Research Universities
- List of universities in Canada
