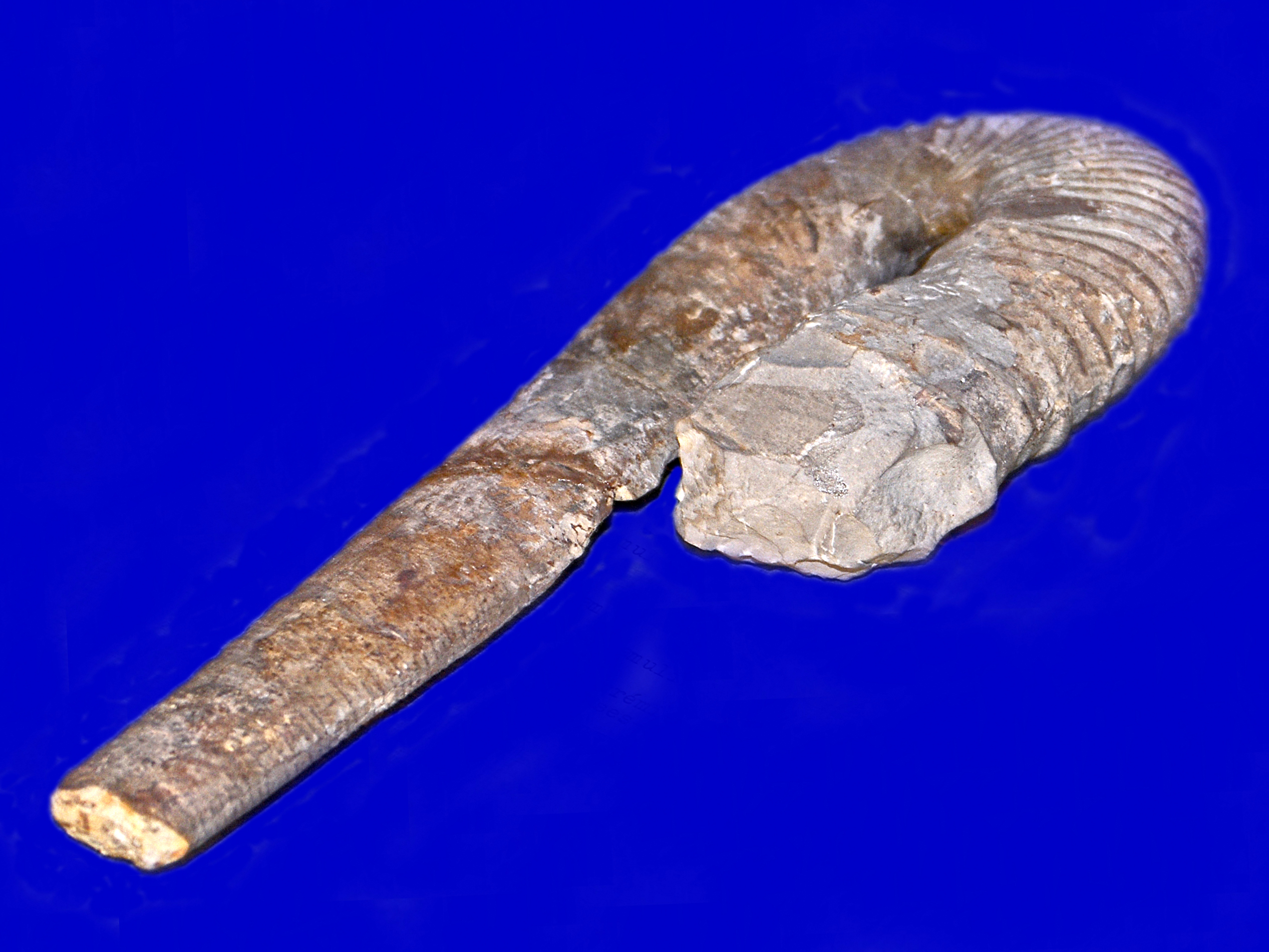
- Hamulina astieri from southern Alps, on display at Galerie de paléontologie et d'anatomie comparée, Paris

Scientific classification
- Kingdom: Animalia
- Phylum: Mollusca
- Class: Cephalopoda
- Subclass: †Ammonoidea
- Order: †Ammonitida
- Suborder: †Ancyloceratina
- Superfamily: †Ancyloceratoidea
- Family: †Hamulinidae; Gill, 1871

= Hamulinidae =

Hamulinidae Temporal range: Cretaceous, 140.2–99.7 Ma

Extinct family of molluscs

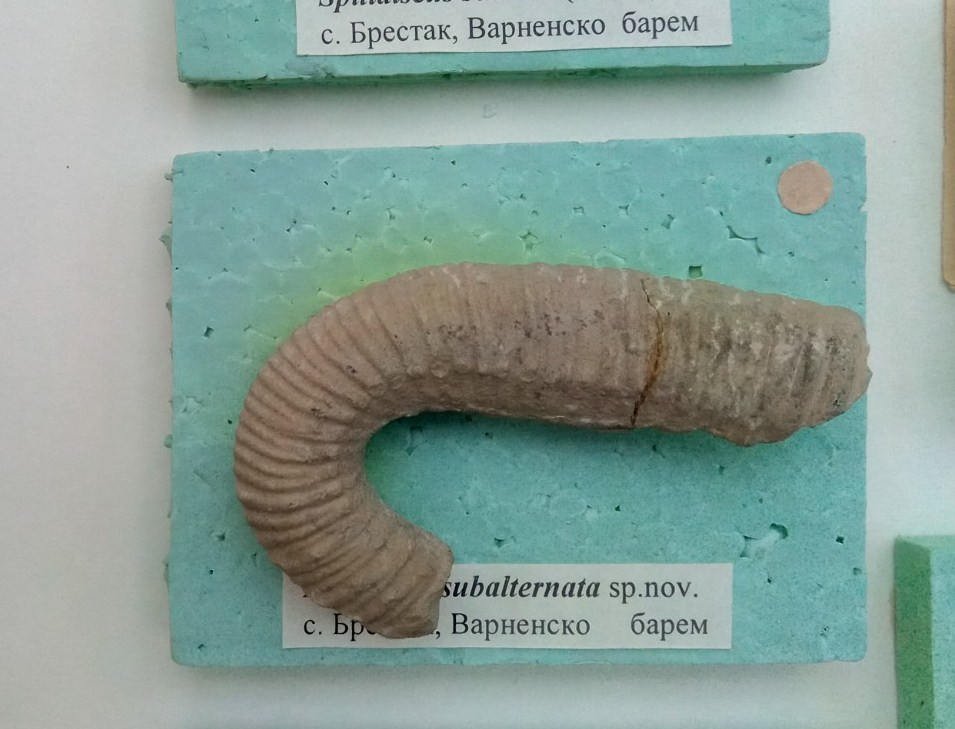
Hamulina subalternata sp. nov. Lower Barremian, Brestak, (Coll. St. Breskovski) at the Sofia University Museum of Paleontology and Historical Geology

Hamulinidae is an extinct ammonoid cephalopod family belonging to the order Ammonitida. These cephalopod were fast-moving nektonic carnivores. They lived during the Lower Cretaceous period (Lower Barremian - Upper Barremian).

== Description ==
The long main shaft is followed by a hook and a shorter, close, parallel or slightly divergent final shaft. The ammonitic suture is with a subtrifid L. The U is usually reduced or indifferentiated in adults.

== Genera ==
- Amorina
- Anahamulina
- Hamulina
