= List of colleges and universities in the United States by endowment =

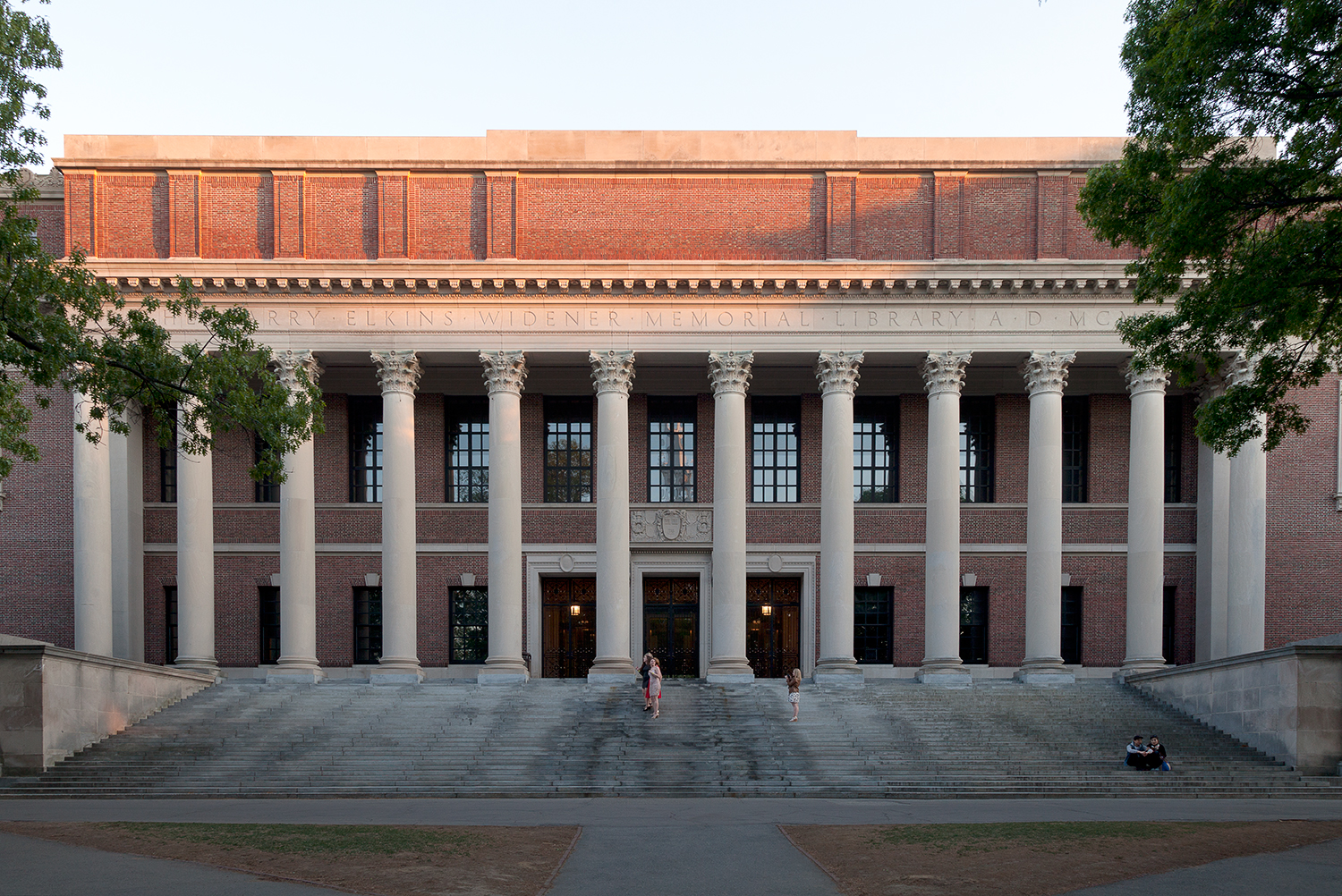
Harvard University, with a $55.67 billion endowment as of FY2025, is the wealthiest university in the world.

Many colleges and universities in the United States maintain a financial endowment consisting of assets that are invested in financial securities, real estate, and other instruments. The investment yields a return that funds a portion of an institution's operational expenses while the principal exists in perpetuity. U.S. colleges and universities maintain some of the largest endowments in the world and make up the vast majority of higher education institutions with endowments greater than $1 billion.

The National Association of College and University Business Officers (NACUBO) maintains information on endowments at U.S. higher education institutions by fiscal year (FY). As of FY2024, the total endowment market value of U.S. institutions stood at $837.720 billion, with an average across all institutions of $1.322 billion and a median of $244.426 million.

There exists significant disparity in endowment income among US universities. One fifth of institutions own four fifths of the endowment wealth, while the bottom 20% of institutions own about 1%.

== Enhancements and levies ==
The tabulated data below are from NACUBO. Some universities benefit from endowments that are not under their direct control but which are nonetheless dedicated to the welfare of one or several institutions. Examples of these foundations include The Duke Endowment, the Robert A. Welch Foundation, and the Roy J. Carver Charitable Trust.

=== Taxes ===
In 2017, a federal endowment tax was enacted in the Tax Cuts and Jobs Act of 2017 in the form of an excise tax of 1.4% on institutions that have at least 500 tuition-paying students and net assets of at least $500,000 per student. The $500,000 is not adjusted for inflation, so the threshold is effectively lowered over time. $244M in taxes was raised from 58 institutions in 2022.

The endowment tax provision of the Tax Cuts and Jobs Act has been criticized as funding tax breaks for corporations and the wealthy at the expense of education. Critics note that the tax could threaten financial aid for low-income students, stifle social mobility, and obstruct life-saving research. Lobbyists representing wealthy private universities continue to advocate for its repeal. The Don't Tax Higher Education Act, which would repeal the endowment tax, was introduced in the 115th United States Congress, 116th United States Congress, and 117th United States Congress but failed in the Ways and Means Committee each time.

The endowment tax was revised in the 2025 Big Beautiful Bill, resulting in higher taxes on the institutions with the greatest wealth per student:

- 8% endowment tax: Princeton University, Yale University, MIT, Stanford University, Harvard University
- 4% endowment tax: University of Notre Dame, Dartmouth College, Rice University, Vanderbilt University, University of Richmond
- 1.4% endowment tax: Emory University, Duke University, Washington University in St. Louis, Penn, Brown University

This endowment tax applies to endowment income, not the endowment.

== Endowments greater than $1 billion ==
=== Private schools ===
Data are from NACUBO as reported in spring of 2026 but some institutions do not report.

Endowment market values of US private institutions, FY2024–FY2025
Rank	Institution	State	FY2025 endowment (billions USD)	FY2024 endowment (billions USD)	Change (%)
1	Harvard University	MA	$55.67	$51.98	+7.11%
2	Yale University	CT	$44.15	$41.44	+6.53%
3	Stanford University	CA	$40.79	$37.63	+8.38%
4	The Trustees of Princeton University	NJ	$36.42	$34.05	+6.94%
5	Massachusetts Institute of Technology	MA	$27.37	$24.57	+11.37%
6	The University of Pennsylvania	PA	$24.81	$22.35	+11.01%
7	University of Notre Dame	IN	$20.09	$17.90	+12.26%
8	Columbia University in the City of New York	NY	$15.92	$14.78	+7.68%
9	Northwestern University	IL	$15.17	$14.21	+6.74%
10	Johns Hopkins University	MD	$13.73	$13.06	+5.14%
11	Washington University in St. Louis	MO	$13.30	$11.98	+11.00%
12	Duke University	NC	$12.32	$11.89	+3.60%
13	Emory University	GA	$12.00	$11.04	+8.66%
14	Cornell University	NY	$11.75	$10.66	+10.23%
15	Vanderbilt University	TN	$10.86	$10.25	+5.95%
16	University of Chicago	IL	$10.62	$10.10	+5.11%
17	University of Southern California	CA	$9.03	$8.15	+10.84%
18	Dartmouth College	NH	$8.96	$8.27	+8.30%
19	Rice University	TX	$8.50	$8.06	+5.37%
20	Brown University	RI	$7.28	$6.72	+8.33%
21	New York University	NY	$7.28	$6.55	+11.15%
22	California Institute of Technology	CA	$4.32	$4.14	+4.16%
23	Carnegie Mellon University	PA	$4.29	$4.00	+7.26%
24	Boston College	MA	$4.24	$3.78	+12.13%
25	Boston University	MA	$4.02	$3.54	+13.56%
26	Georgetown University	DC	$3.95	$3.64	+8.60%
27	Williams College	MA	$3.93	$3.66	+7.54%
28	Amherst College	MA	$3.90	$3.55	+9.83%
29	University of Richmond	VA	$3.49	$3.25	+7.67%
30	University of Rochester	NY	$3.24	$2.99	+8.52%
31	Pomona College	CA	$3.22	$2.99	+7.65%
32	Wellesley College	MA	$3.19	$3.01	+6.00%
33	Bowdoin College	ME	$2.92	$2.58	+12.90%
34	Texas Christian University	TX	$2.85	$2.68	+6.65%
35	Grinnell College	IA	$2.85	$2.67	+6.61%
36	Swarthmore College	PA	$2.84	$2.73	+4.19%
37	The George Washington University	DC	$2.81	$2.64	+6.55%
38	Smith College	MA	$2.71	$2.56	+5.67%
39	Tufts University	MA	$2.71	$2.53	+6.84%
40	The Rockefeller University	NY	$2.61	$2.42	+7.76%
41	Case Western Reserve University	OH	$2.52	$2.40	+5.15%
42	Tulane University	LA	$2.47	$2.27	+8.52%
43	Southern Methodist University	TX	$2.34	$2.12	+10.25%
44	Syracuse University	NY	$2.27	$2.10	+8.25%
45	Washington and Lee University	VA	$2.19	$2.04	+7.29%
46	Baylor University	TX	$2.18	$2.09	+4.10%
47	Wake Forest University	NC	$2.15	$2.00	+7.63%
48	Saint Louis University	MO	$2.02	$1.88	+7.40%
49	Lehigh University	PA	$2.00	$1.87	+6.93%
50	Trinity University	TX	$1.94	$1.83	+5.73%
51	Medical College of Wisconsin	WI	$1.94	$1.80	+7.73%
52	Berea College	KY	$1.83	$1.65	+11.05%
53	Middlebury College	VT	$1.73	$1.60	+8.25%
54	University of Miami	FL	$1.71	$1.59	+7.73%
55	Santa Clara University	CA	$1.67	$1.56	+7.29%
56	Wesleyan University	CT	$1.64	$1.58	+3.66%
57	School of the Art Institute of Chicago	IL	$1.60	$1.50	+6.42%
58	Princeton Theological Seminary	NJ	$1.56	$1.45	+7.54%
59	Hamilton College	NY	$1.50	$1.36	+9.89%
60	Oberlin College	OH	$1.48	$1.27	+16.56%
61	Villanova University	PA	$1.47	$1.34	+10.24%
62	Berry College	GA	$1.47	$1.37	+7.17%
63	Rochester Institute of Technology	NY	$1.46	$1.37	+6.57%
64	Davidson College	NC	$1.46	$1.37	+6.23%
65	Loma Linda University	CA	$1.44	$1.35	+7.12%
66	Baylor College of Medicine	TX	$1.43	$1.48	-3.68%
67	Vassar College	NY	$1.39	$1.30	+7.13%
68	Loyola University of Chicago	IL	$1.37	$1.06	+11.03%
69	Brandeis University	MA	$1.36	$1.26	+7.30%
70	Claremont McKenna College	CA	$1.35	$1.24	+9.16%
71	Colgate University	NY	$1.34	$1.25	+7.18%
72	Bryn Mawr College	PA	$1.34	$1.21	+10.99%
73	University of Tulsa	OK	$1.34	$1.28	+3.95%
74	Carleton College	MN	$1.33	$1.24	+7.85%
75	Pepperdine University	CA	$1.29	$1.30	-0.20%
76	Bucknell University	PA	$1.26	$1.17	+8.23%
77	Colby College	ME	$1.25	$1.16	+7.94%
78	College of the Holy Cross	MA	$1.21	$1.11	+8.87%
79	Lafayette College	PA	$1.20	$1.12	+6.75%
80	Mount Holyoke College	MA	$1.18	$1.10	+7.15%
81	DePaul University	IL	$1.15	$1.02	+13.12%
82	University of Denver	CO	$1.15	$1.09	+5.86%
83	Drexel University	PA	$1.13	$1.07	+5.86%
84	Marquette University	WI	$1.13	$1.00	+13.48%
85	American University	DC	$1.12	$1.05	+6.90%
86	Howard University	DC	$1.12	$1.03	+8.47%
87	Denison University	OH	$1.10	$1.04	+6.26%
88	Colorado College	CO	$1.06	$0.99	+7.21%
89	Fordham University	NY	$1.05	$1.02	+2.85%

=== Public schools ===
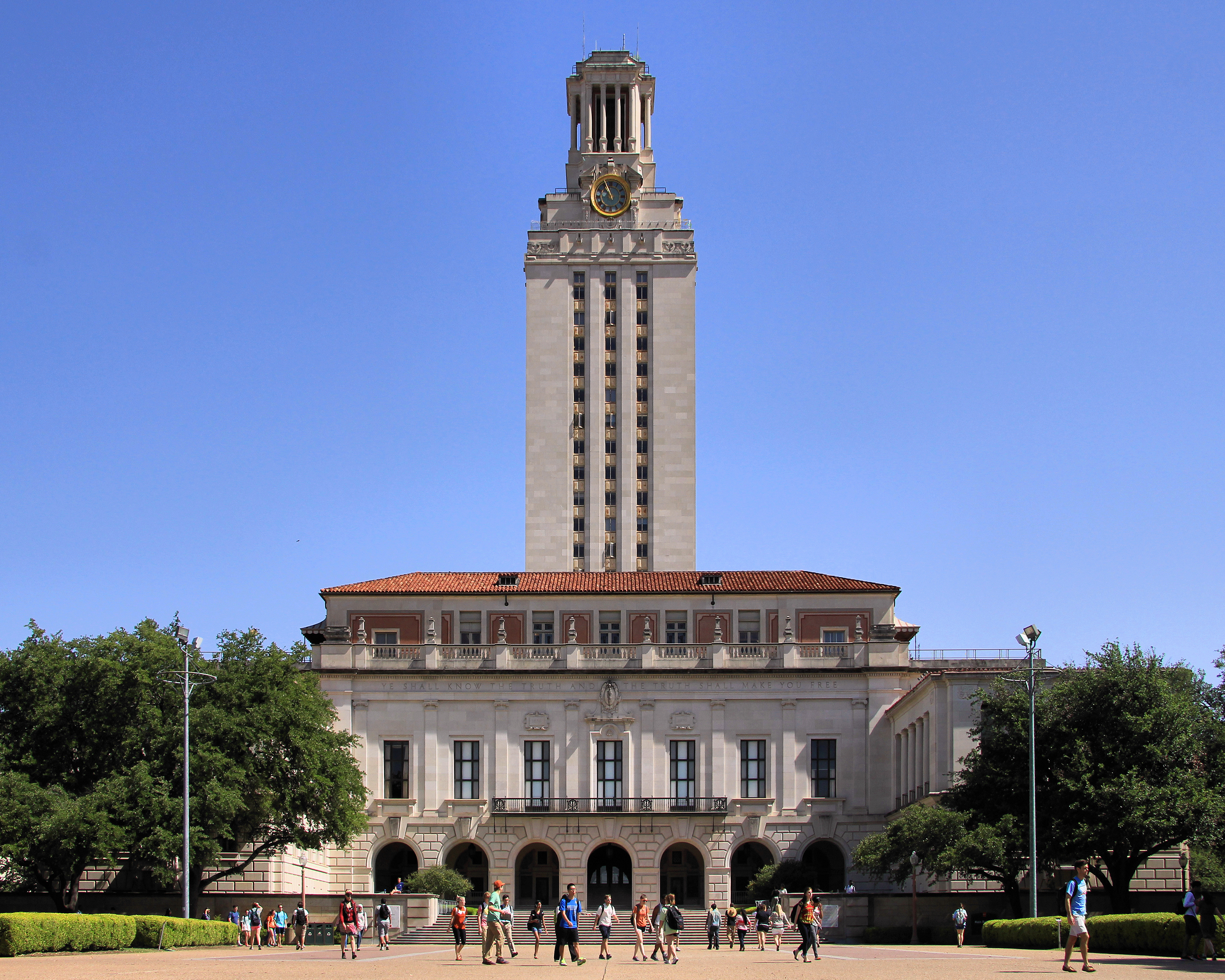
The University of Texas System has the largest system-wide endowment of any American public higher education institution.

For public universities, larger endowments are often associated with flagship state universities, especially those with medical schools. Fourteen states do not have institutions included in this list: Alaska, Connecticut, Hawaii, Idaho, Maine, Montana, Nevada, New Mexico, North Dakota, Rhode Island, South Dakota, Vermont, West Virginia, and Wyoming. Many of these states have small populations. The New England states, however, are known for well-endowed private institutions.

Data are from NACUBO as reported in spring of 2026, but some institutions do not report.

Endowment market values of US public institutions and systems, FY2024–FY2025
Rank	Institution	State	FY2025 endowment (billions USD)	FY2024 endowment (billions USD)	Change (%)
1	The University of Texas System	TX	$27.17	$24.74	+9.81%
2	The Texas A&M University System & Related Foundations	TX	$22.23	$20.38	+9.07%
3	University of Michigan	MI	$21.20	$19.17	+10.61%
4	The Regents of the University of California	CA	$20.15	$19.10	+5.46%
5	University of Virginia	VA	$11.23	$10.22	+9.91%
6	The Ohio State University	OH	$8.62	$7.93	+8.68%
7	The University of Texas at Austin	TX	$6.49	$6.08	+6.76%
8	University of Minnesota & Foundations	MN	$6.45	$5.94	+8.65%
9	University of North Carolina at Chapel Hill	NC	$6.22	$5.73	+8.62%
10	University of Pittsburgh	PA	$6.15	$5.80	+6.02%
11	The Pennsylvania State University	PA	$5.06	$4.77	+6.14%
12	University of Wisconsin Foundation	WI	$4.92	$4.30	+14.31%
13	UCLA Foundation	CA	$4.77	$4.30	+10.89%
14	Michigan State University	MI	$4.61	$4.42	+4.23%
15	Purdue University	IN	$4.44	$4.11	+8.07%
16	Indiana University Foundation	IN	$4.05	$3.82	+6.08%
17	University of Illinois & Foundations	IL	$3.80	$3.69	+2.96%
18	University of Iowa and Foundations	IA	$3.77	$3.50	+7.76%
19	Georgia Institute of Technology and Related Foundations	GA	$3.51	$3.17	+10.75%
20	University of California Berkeley Foundation	CA	$3.39	$3.11	+9.06%
21	University of California San Francisco	CA	$3.29	$2.95	+11.63%
22	Virginia Commonwealth University and Affiliated Entities	VA	$3.23	$2.89	+11.88%
23	Texas Tech University	TX	$3.07	$2.90	+5.72%
24	University of Nebraska	NE	$2.72	$2.53	+7.48%
25	University of Florida Foundation Inc.	FL	$2.69	$2.45	+9.56%
26	The Kansas University Endowment Association	KS	$2.69	$2.53	+6.41%
27	The Board of Trustees of The University of Alabama	AL	$2.59	$2.38	+8.79%
28	University of Missouri System	MO	$2.55	$2.41	+5.81%
29	North Carolina State University	NC	$2.54	$2.22	+14.49%
30	The University of Texas Southwestern Medical Center	TX	$2.47	$2.32	+6.52%
31	University of Colorado Foundation	CO	$2.47	$2.25	+10.08%
32	The University System of Maryland Foundation	MD	$2.46	$2.29	+7.37%
33	Rutgers The State University of New Jersey	NJ	$2.35	$2.18	+7.83%
34	The University of Georgia and Related Foundations	GA	$2.18	$2.06	+6.19%
35	University of Kentucky	KY	$2.17	$1.98	+9.80%
36	Texas State University System	TX	$2.11	$1.41	+50.25%
37	Virginia Tech Foundation	VA	$2.09	$1.95	+7.12%
38	The University of Utah	UT	$2.07	$1.86	+11.35%
39	University of Delaware	DE	$2.06	$1.93	+6.56%
40	The University of Texas M.D. Anderson Cancer Center	TX	$1.96	$1.85	+6.17%
41	The University of Tennessee System	TN	$1.92	$1.77	+8.44%
42	Iowa State University	IA	$1.91	$1.72	+11.48%
43	University of Oregon Foundation	OR	$1.84	$1.65	+11.67%
44	University of Arkansas at Fayetteville and Foundation	AR	$1.81	$1.67	+8.95%
45	University of Massachusetts Foundation	MA	$1.80	$1.55	+16.44%
46	University of California San Diego	CA	$1.79	$1.59	+12.81%
47	University of Cincinnati	OH	$1.77	$1.45	+22.30%
48	Arizona State University	AZ	$1.76	$1.59	+10.41%
49	William & Mary and Foundations	VA	$1.59	$1.45	+9.65%
50	Oklahoma State University Foundation	OK	$1.56	$1.48	+5.60%
51	The University of Arizona and the University of Arizona Foundation	AZ	$1.50	$1.39	+8.17%
52	Oklahoma State Regents for Higher Education	OK	$1.31	$1.21	+7.71%
53	Auburn University and Foundation	AL	$1.31	$1.19	+10.01%
54	Oregon Health and Science University Foundation	OR	$1.30	$1.25	+3.92%
55	Clemson University Foundation	SC	$1.24	$1.12	+10.33%
56	Louisiana State University System	LA	$1.24	$1.14	+8.76%
57	The University of Texas at San Antonio	TX	$1.21	$1.13	+6.87%
58	University at Buffalo Foundation Inc.	NY	$1.17	$1.06	+10.66%
59	University of South Carolina and Affiliated Foundations	SC	$1.15	$1.04	+9.65%
60	Florida State University Foundation Inc.	FL	$1.11	$1.03	+7.82%
61	The University of Texas Health Science Center at Houston	TX	$1.10	$1.01	+8.84%
62	Miami University	OH	$1.09	$0.81	+33.96%
63	University of Louisville Foundation	KY	$1.07	$1.01	+6.52%
64	University System of New Hampshire & University of New Hampshire Foundation	NH	$1.06	$0.98	+8.30%
65	Temple University	PA	$1.05	$0.93	+13.03%
66	University of California Irvine Foundation	CA	$1.03	$0.90	+14.30%
67	Oregon State University Foundation	OR	$1.01	$0.90	+12.88%
68	University of Mississippi Foundation	MS	$1.00	$0.92	+8.20%
69	Mississippi State University & Foundation	MS	$1.00	$0.89	+11.77%

== Endowments per student greater than $1 million ==
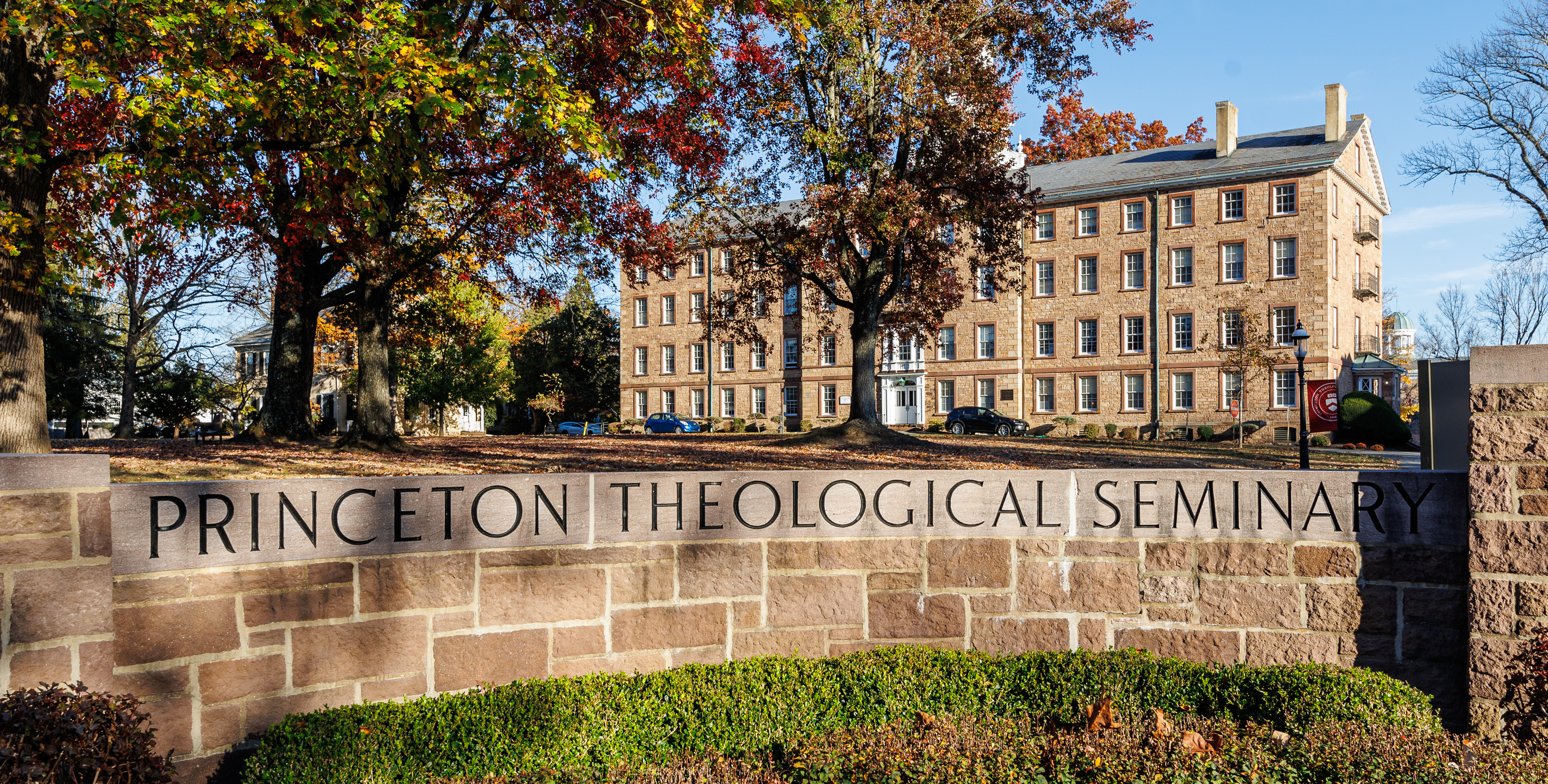
Princeton Theological Seminary has the largest endowment per student in the United States.

Counterbalancing the effect of the large endowments per student for private institutions, average tuition and fees at private four-year institutions were approximately two to four times the average tuition and fees of four-year public institutions in academic year 2021–2022. In 2026 a 4–8% tax will be levied on these high dollar per student endowments. In fact, many private institutions will be subject to some taxation.

Rank	Institution	Enrollment (FTE – fall 2023)	Endowment per student (USD – FY2024)	Change (1‑year)
1	Princeton Theological Seminary	282	$5,154,575	+12.2%
2	Princeton University	9,079	$3,750,669	−2.1%
3	Yale University	15,269	$2,714,107	−2.4%
4	Stanford University	17,623	$2,135,335	+1.5%
5	Harvard University	24,357	$2,133,974	+5.0%
6	Massachusetts Institute of Technology	11,777	$2,086,500	+4.1%
7	RAND School of Public Policy	158	$1,981,314	−11.4%
8	Amherst College	1,910	$1,858,417	+5.6%
9	Pomona College	1,652	$1,810,914	+11.4%
10	Williams College	2,140	$1,708,205	+4.3%
11	California Institute of Technology	2,463	$1,682,826	+10.2%
12	Columbia Theological Seminary	167	$1,676,212	+11.1%
13	Swarthmore College	1,712	$1,593,734	−0.5%
14	Grinnell College	1,750	$1,526,198	+5.0%
15	Austin Presbyterian Theological Seminary	110	$1,445,756	+7.4%
16	University of Notre Dame	12,785	$1,399,873	+8.7%
17	Bowdoin College	1,847	$1,397,968	+10.2%
18	Wellesley College	2,362	$1,272,249	+16.3%
19	Dartmouth College	6,700	$1,234,823	+5.0%
20	Principia College	838	$1,141,078	+10.3%
21	Berea College	1,487	$1,108,849	+4.2%
22	Medical College of Wisconsin	1,656	$1,085,649	+9.7%
23	Smith College	2,495	$1,027,705	+18.5%

== See also ==
- Lists of institutions of higher education by endowment size
