= List of South African universities by endowment =

Location of South Africa

The following table is a list of South African universities by endowment size.

== Public universities ==
The following are the South African universities with the largest financial endowments, expressed in South African Rands at fair value. A financial endowment is a transfer of money and/or property donated to an institution and the total value of an institution's investments is often referred to as the institution's endowment. All sources are official audited financial statements published in the respective fiscal years. For this list, short scale billions (thousand of millions) are used.

Institution	2011 million ZAR	2010 million ZAR	2009 million ZAR	2008 million ZAR
University of South Africa	R4,925	R4,526	R3,884	R3,481
University of Pretoria		R2,470	R2,166	R1,641
University of Cape Town	R2,548	R2,365	R2,173	R1,896
University of the Witwatersrand	R1,612	R1,588		
University of Stellenbosch		R1,483		
University of KwaZulu-Natal		R0,844	R0,769	R0,659
North-West University		R0,534	R0,390	
Rhodes University	R0,310	R0,296		R0,429
Cape Peninsula University of Technology				
Central University of Technology				
Durban University of Technology				
University of Fort Hare				
University of the Free State				
University of Johannesburg				
University of Limpopo				
Nelson Mandela Metropolitan University				
Tshwane University of Technology				
Vaal University of Technology				
University of Venda				
Walter Sisulu University for Technology and Science				
University of the Western Cape				
University of Zululand				

== See also ==
- List of universities in South Africa
- Lists of institutions of higher education by endowment size
