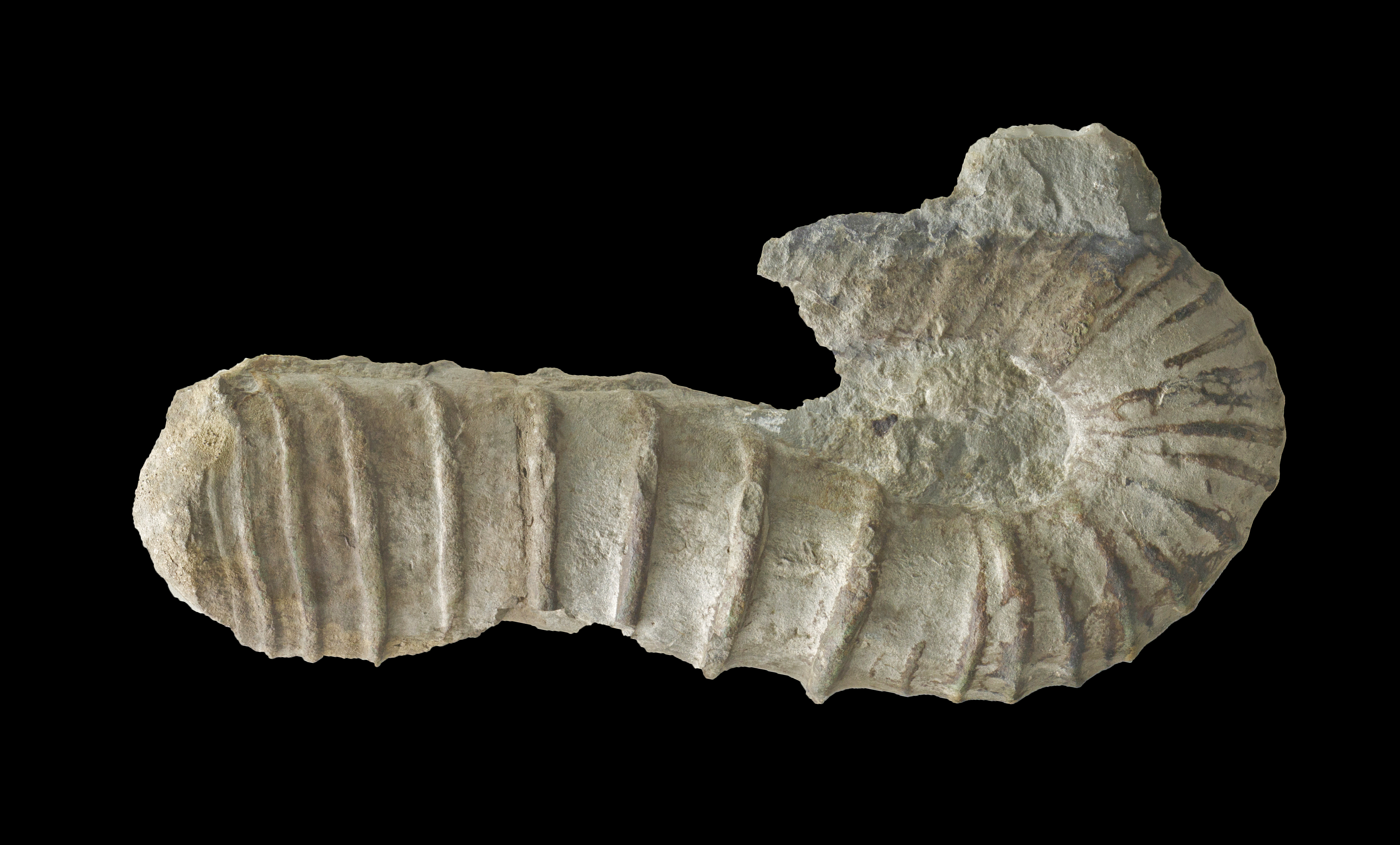
- Hamulina astieri

Scientific classification
- Kingdom: Animalia
- Phylum: Mollusca
- Class: Cephalopoda
- Subclass: †Ammonoidea
- Order: †Ammonitida
- Suborder: †Ancyloceratina
- Family: †Hamulinidae
- Genus: †Hamulina d'Orbigny, 1850

= Hamulina =

Hamulina Temporal range: Cretaceous (Barremian), 145.5–99.7 Ma

Genus of molluscs (fossil)

Hamulina is an extinct ammonoid cephalopod genus belonging to the family Hamulinidae. These cephalopod were fast-moving nektonic carnivores. They lived during the Cretaceous period, Barremian age. The type species is Hamulina astieriana.

== Description ==
It may be large. The whorl section generally is increasing rapidly. The short final shaft is generally straight or curved. The main shaft is with dense, fine, prorsiradiate minor ribs and distant, periodic, weakly trituberculate major ribs. The minor ribs are weakened or disappearing on hook and final shaft. The major ribs are strengthened and approximating. The ammonitic suture is finely divided.

== Distribution ==
Fossils of these cephalopods have been found in rocks of Cretaceous of Bulgaria, Colombia (Santa Rosa de Viterbo, Boyacá), Hungary, Italy, Mexico, Spain, Trinidad and Tobago.

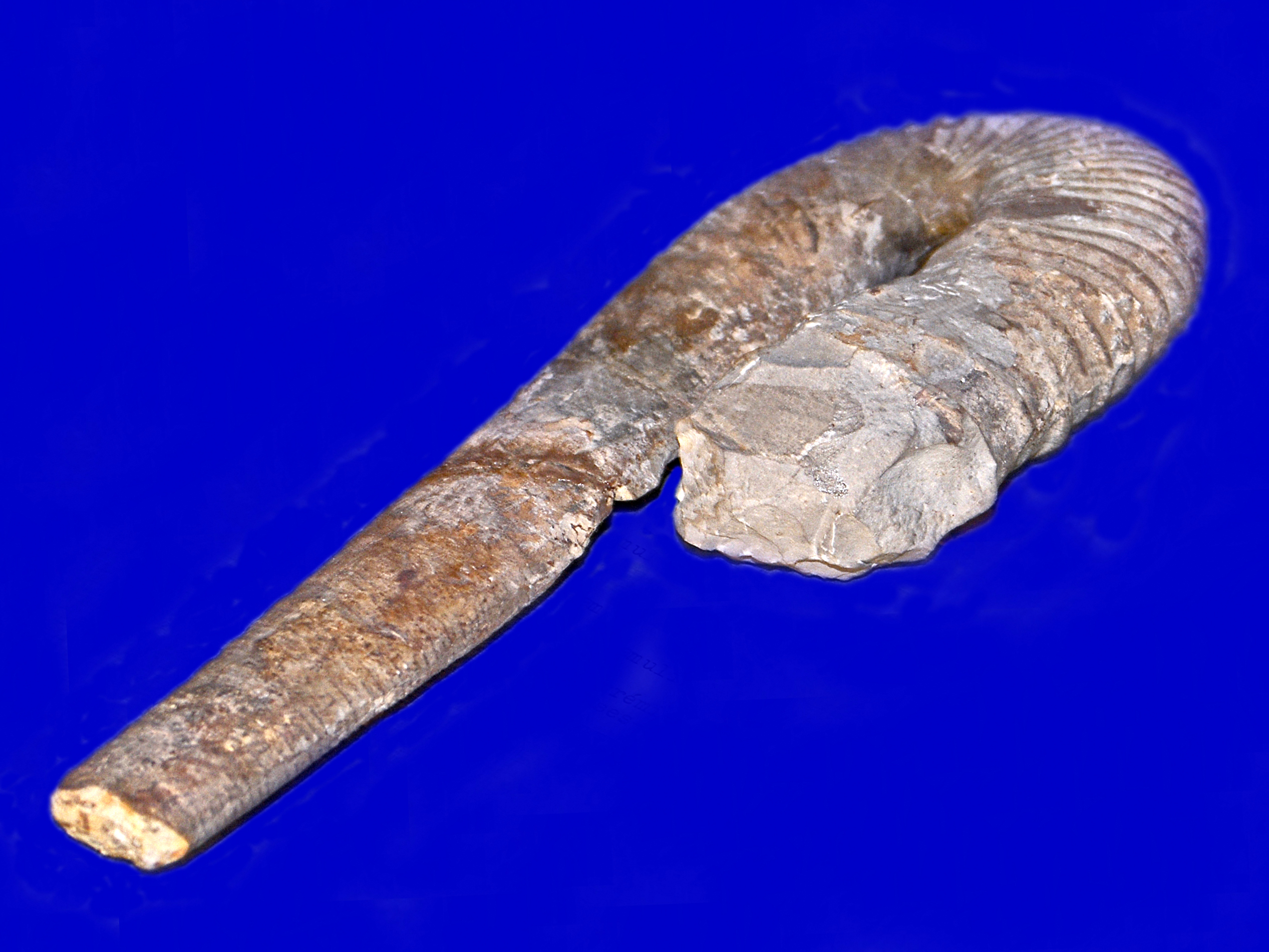
Hamulina astieri from southern Alps, on display at Galerie de paléontologie et d'anatomie comparée, Paris

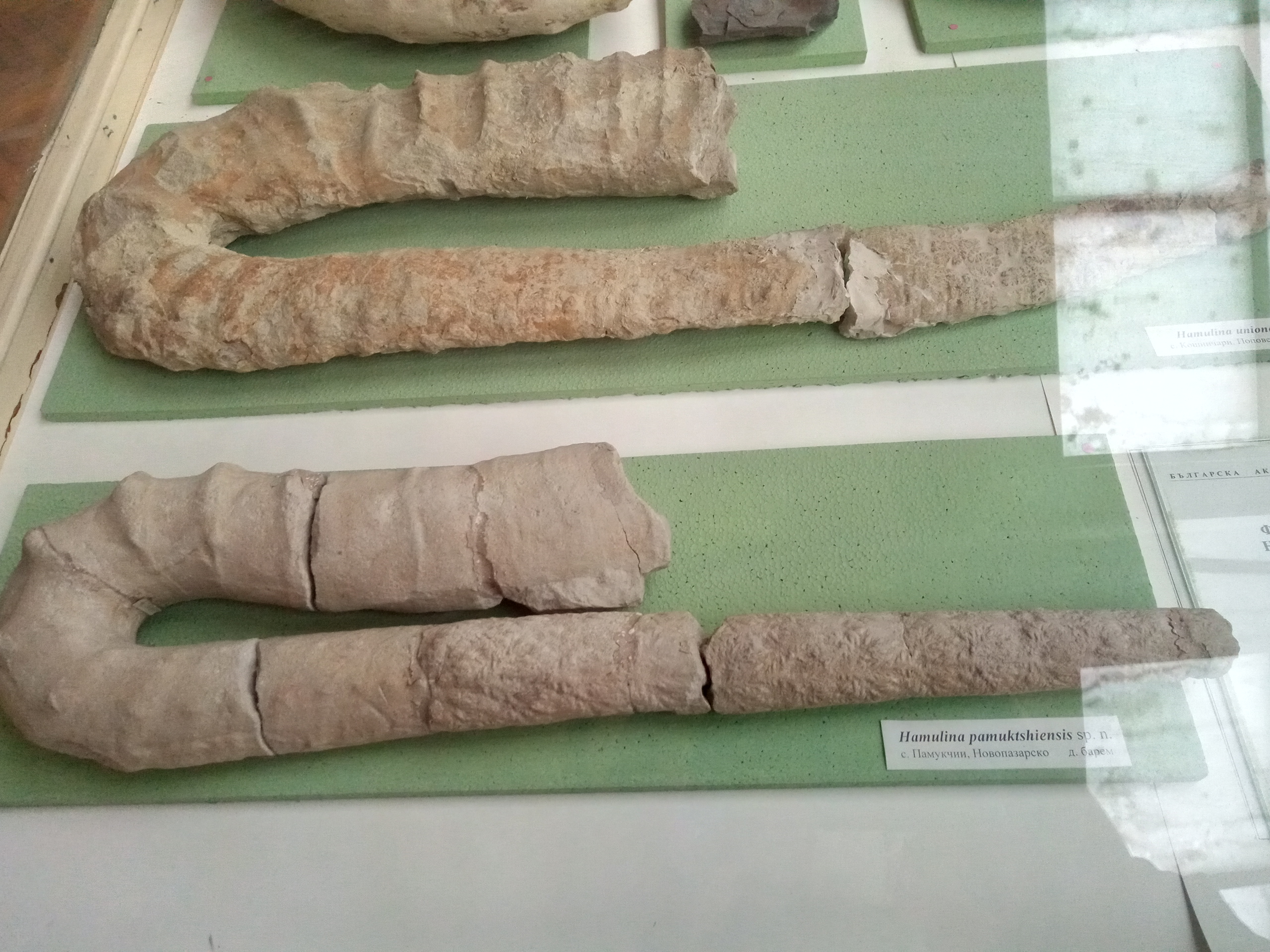
Hamulina pamuktschiensis sp.n., Lower Barremian, Pamuktschii at the Sofia University Museum of Paleontology and Historical Geology
