= Statement of recommended practice =

A statement of recommended practice (SORP), issued in the UK and Ireland, provides recommendations on financial reporting that supplement official accounting standards. SORPs are developed and issued by industry and sector bodies that must meet criteria set by the Financial Reporting Council. SORPs are developed in accordance with current financial reporting practice and must not conflict with accounting standards or financial reporting objectives.

Statements of recommended practice in issue.
Sector	SORP-making body	SORP
Charities	Charity Commission, Office of the Scottish Charity Regulator and Charity Commission for Northern Ireland	Charities SORP (FRS 102) – Accounting and Reporting by Charities : Statement of Recommended Practice applicable to charities preparing their accounts in accordance with the Financial Reporting Standard applicable in the UK and Republic of Ireland (effective 1 January 2015)
Further and Higher Education	Universities UK and British Universities Finance Directors Group (BUFDG)	Statement of recommended practice – Accounting for further and higher education (March 2014)
Registered providers of social housing	National Housing Federation, Community Housing Cymru, Scottish Federation of Housing Associations and Northern Ireland Federation of Housing Associations	Housing SORP 2014 – Statement of Recommended Practice for registered social housing providers
Authorised funds	Investment Association	Statement of Recommended Practice – Financial Statements of UK Authorised Funds (May 2014) – updated in 2017
Investment trust companies and venture capital trusts	Association of Investment Companies	Statement of Recommended Practice: Financial Statements of Investment Trust Companies and Venture Capital Trusts (Issued in November 2014 and updated in January 2017 with consequential amendments)
Limited liability partnerships	CCAB	Statement of Recommended Practice –Accounting for Limited Liability Partnerships (Effective for periods commencing on or after 1 January 2016)
Pension schemes	Pensions Research Accountants Group	Financial Reports of Pension Schemes – A Statement of Recommended Practice (2018)
