= Collection (museum) =

Group of objects owned by a museum

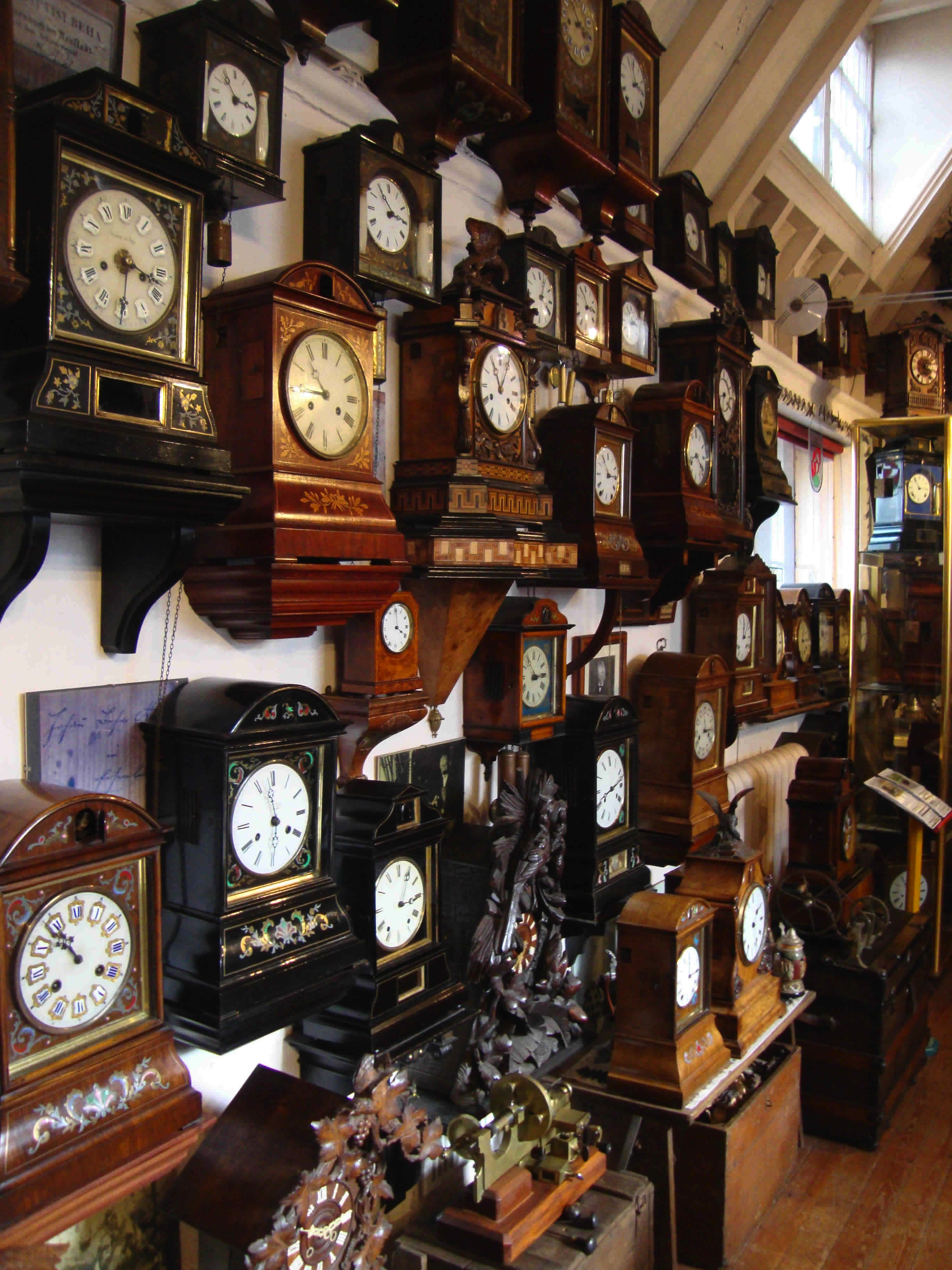
Antique cuckoo clocks in the defunct Cuckooland Museum, which was a specialized museum in Tabley, England

A museum is distinguished by a collection of often unique objects that forms the core of its activities for exhibitions, education, research, etc. This differentiates it from an archive or library, where the contents may be more paper-based, replaceable and less exhibition oriented, or a private collection of art formed by an individual, family or institution that may grant no public access. A museum normally has a collecting policy for new acquisitions, so only objects in certain categories and of a certain quality are accepted into the collection. The process by which an object is formally included in the collection is called accessioning and each object is given a unique accession number.

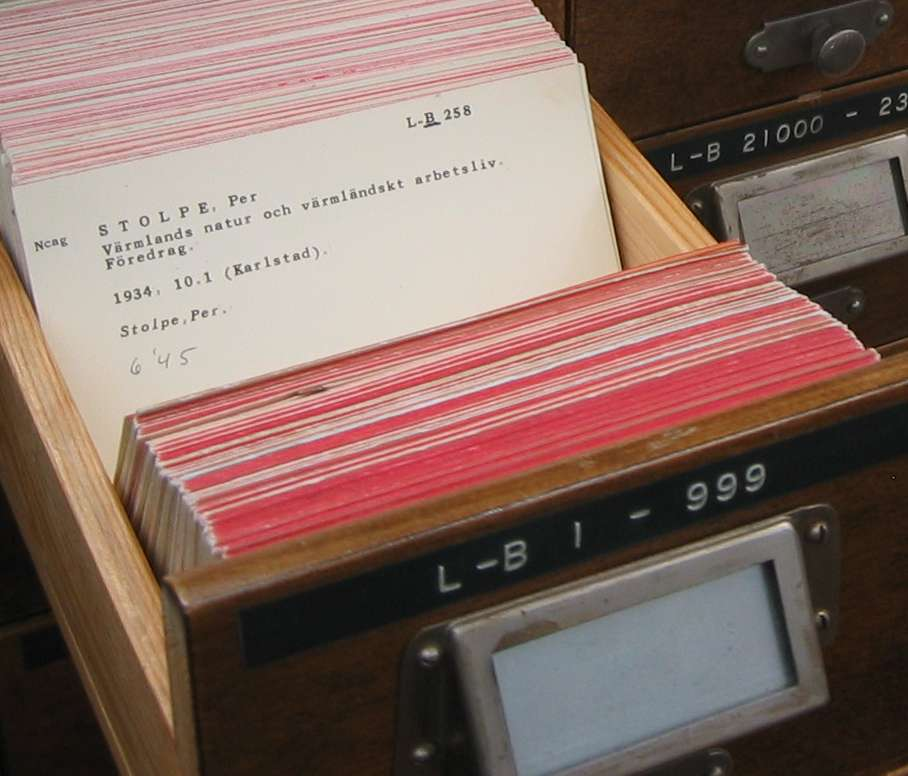
A catalogue of the items in a collection using index cards

Museum collections, and archives in general, are normally catalogued in a collection catalogue, traditionally in a card index, but nowadays in a computerized database. Transferring collection catalogues onto computer-based media is a major undertaking for most museums. All new acquisitions are normally catalogued on a computer in modern museums, but there is typically a backlog of old catalogue entries to be computerized as time and funding allows.

A museum's permanent collection are assets that the museum owns and may display, although space and conservation requirements often mean that most of a collection is not on display. Museums often also host temporary exhibitions of works that may come all or partly from their permanent collection, or may be all or partly loaned (a "loan exhibition"). A travelling exhibition is shown in more than one venue; these tend to be either large loan exhibitions which may be exhibited at two or three venues in different countries, or selections from the collection of a large museum which tour to a number of regional museums.

== Types ==
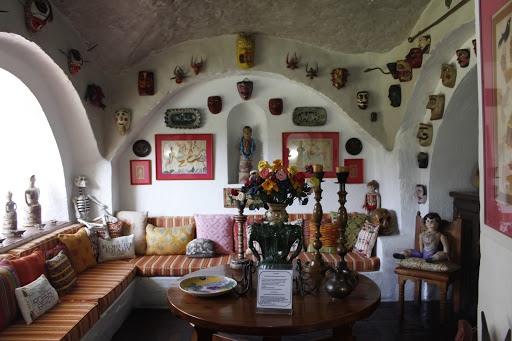
A collection of masks and textiles from different parts of the world displayed in the living room of the Robert Brady Museum, Cuernavaca, Mexico

Museum collections are widely varied. There are collections of art, of scientific specimens, of historic objects, of living zoological specimens and much more. Because there are so many things to collect, most museums have a specific area of specialization. For example, a history museum may only collect objects relevant to a particular county or even a single person, or focus on a type of object such as automobiles or stamps. Art museums may focus on a period, such as modern art, or a region. Very large museums will often have many sub-collections, each with its own criteria for collecting. A natural history museum, for example, will have mammals in a separate collection from insects.

Because museums cannot collect everything, each potential new addition must be carefully considered as to its appropriateness for a given museum's defined area of interest.

== Accessioning ==
Accessioning is the formal, legal process of accepting an object into a museum collection. Because accessioning an object carries an obligation to care for that object in perpetuity, it is a serious decision. While in the past many museums accepted objects with little deliberation, today most museums have accepted the need for formal accessioning procedures and practices. These are typically set out as part of a museum's collection management policy (CMP).

While each museum has its own procedures for accessioning, in most cases it begins with either an offer from a donor to give an object to a museum, or a recommendation from a curator to acquire an object through purchase or trade. Art objects may also come into a collection as a commission. An accession may also be bequeathed to a museum and are included in an estate or trust.

Several issues must be considered in the decision to accept an object. Common issues include:

- Is the object relevant to the museum's mission and its scope of collecting, as defined by its governing body?
- Was the object lawfully acquired and if foreign in origin, imported in compliance with international law?
- Does the owner of an object have legal title to the object and therefore the right to transfer it?
- Are there any other parties with an interest in the object (e.g. heirs of a donor, descendant groups for cultural objects, etc.)?
- Is the object encumbered by any legal obligations or constraints (e.g., natural history objects that require special permits)?
- Would the object pose any threats or dangers to other objects or staff?
- Does the museum have the resources to properly care for the object (e.g., appropriate storage space, adequate funding)
- Is the object encumbered by any donor restrictions?

Answering these questions often required investigating an object's provenance, the history of an object from the time it was made.

Many museums will not accession objects that have been acquired illegally or where other parties have an interest in the object. In art museums, special care is given to objects that changed hands in European countries during World War II and archaeological objects unearthed after the 1970 UNESCO Convention covering the transport of cultural property. Other disciplines have different concerns. For example, anthropology museums will pay special attention to Native American objects that may be subject to repatriation, and paleontology museums may look carefully at whether proper permitting procedures were followed when they are offered fossil collections.

While in the past, museums often accepted objects with donor-based restrictions, many museums today ask that gifts be given unrestricted. Common donor restrictions include requiring that an object always be exhibited, or that a collection stays together. However, such restrictions can prevent museums from changing their exhibits as scholarship evolves and may introduce conservation issues for delicate objects not suited to continued display.

Final decision to accept an object generally lies with the museum's board of trustees. In large museums, a special committee may meet regularly to review potential acquisitions. Once the decision has been made to accept an object, it is formally accessioned through a Deed of Gift and entered into the museum's catalog records. Each object is given a unique catalog number to identify it. Objects are then packed for appropriate archival storage, or prepared for exhibition or other educational use.

== Care ==
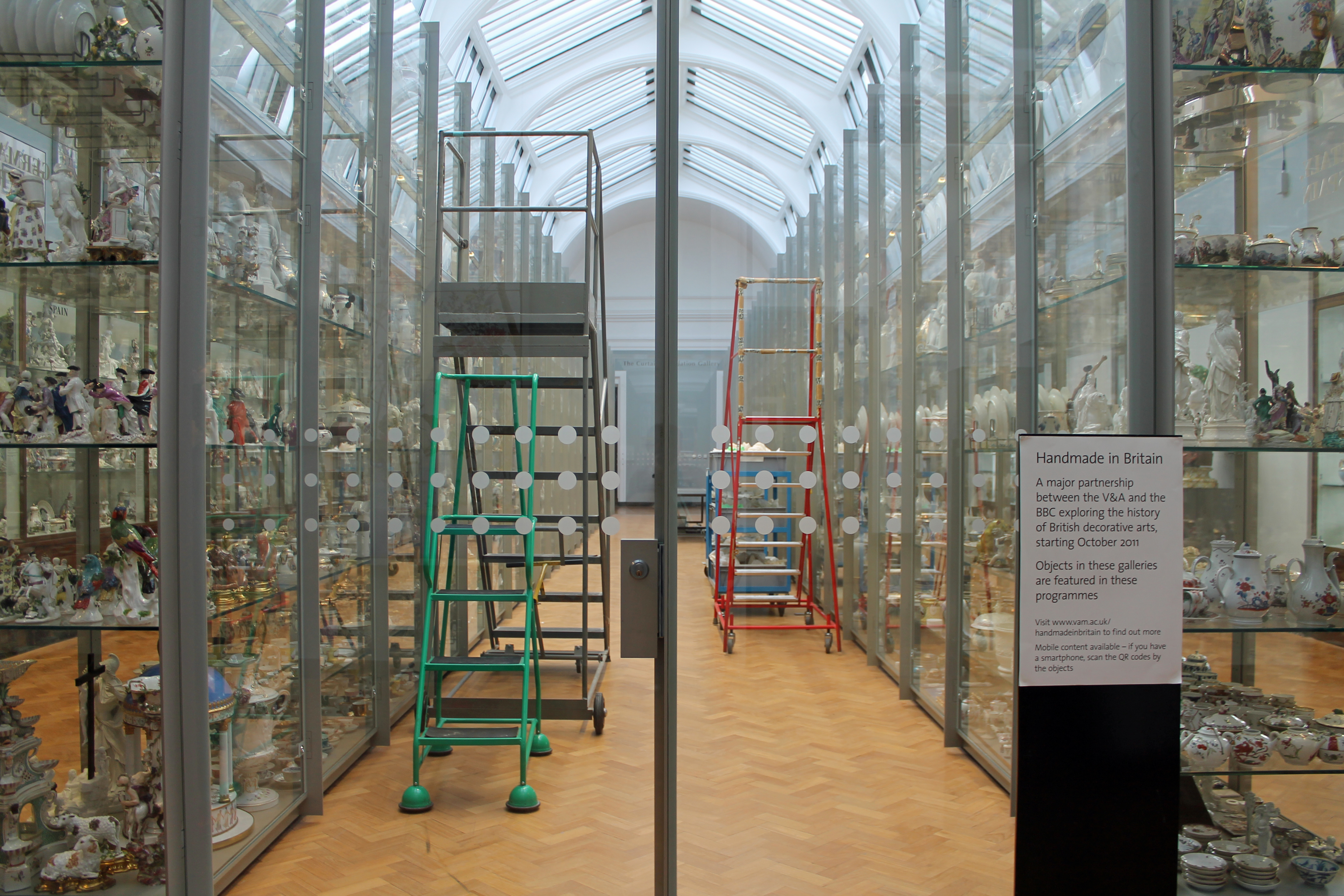
Visual storage at the Victoria & Albert Museum, London, England

Once accessioned into the collection, museum objects must be appropriately cared for. New objects may be examined by a conservator and treated for any pre-existing damage. The object is then cataloged by a curator or other specialist with knowledge of the object's importance and history. The object will then be given an appropriate storage location.

Museum storage conditions are meant to protect the object and to minimize any deterioration. This often means keeping objects in a stable climate, preventing exposure to pests, minimizing any handling, and using only archival materials that will not deteriorate or harm the objects. Object safety also include providing appropriate security, and planning for disasters and other threats, and making sure that museum staff are trained in proper handling procedures.

Different types of objects have different requirements, and many museums have specialized storage areas. For example, framed paintings may be stored in racks in one room while unframed paintings are kept in large drawers in another. Some objects have extremely specialized needs. For example, material from underwater archaeological sites may need to be kept wet, and some very rare and badly deteriorated objects require oxygen-free environments.

At any given time, museums display only a portion of their collections. This is often because exhibition requires much more space than storage, and is impractical for the entire collection to be out. Museums may also contain many duplicate or similar objects and find that a few specimens are better suited to display than others. In addition, certain objects, particularly works on paper and textiles, are damaged by light and must only be displayed for short periods of time.

Museum collections are often made up of a variety of materials in a single collection including, but not limited to: canvas, oil and/or acrylic paints, wood, ivory, paper, bone, leather, and textiles. The biggest conservation issue for museum collections is the fluctuations in relative humidity and temperature. Relative Humidity (RH) is a measure of the percentage of saturation of the air.

Temperature is not as important to the life of a work of art, but it is true that chemical reactions occur faster at higher temperatures. However, a museum must take into account the comfort of its staff and visitors and it has been widely accepted that 68–75 °F (20–24 °C) does not cause a lot of problems for most artifacts and is comfortable for most humans.

It has also been internationally agreed upon that the RH should be set at 50–55%. This has become widely accepted because the lower limit was set at 45% since damage to organic materials begin to occur below this point. The upper limit is placed at 65% because mold flourishes at 70% RH. It is also cheaper for most institutions to maintain 50% RH rather than 45% or 60%. There is some exception when it comes to tropical climates since the indigenous artifacts are acclimated to RH levels higher than the "museum norm". Changes can be made to a museum's RH to accommodate the changing seasons, but they must be made gradually. Humidity should change in 2% per month increments (an increase in 1 °F will affect a decrease of about 2% RH).

== Deaccessioning ==
Deaccessioning, the process of disposing, selling or trading objects from a museum collection, is not undertaken lightly in most museums. There are ethical issues to consider since many donors of objects typically expect the museum to care for them in perpetuity. Deaccessioning of an object in a collection may be appropriate if a museum has more than one example of that object and if the object is being transferred to another museum. It may also be appropriate if an object is badly deteriorated or threatening other objects.

The decision to deaccession includes two parts. These are making the decision to deaccession and deciding the method of disposal. Generally, first choice is to transfer an object to another use or division in a museum, such as deaccessioning a duplicate object from a permanent collection into a teaching collection. Second choice is to transfer the object to another institution, generally with local institutions having priority. The American Alliance of Museums and other regional associations often operate lists or boards to help facilitate such transfers. Last choice is sale on the open market. Open market sales are generally expected to take place at auction rather than through private sale, and are typically most common in art museums due to the high monetary value of art collections.

A controversial example occurred when the last remaining complete dodo mount in a museum collection at Oxford University was deaccessioned due to its deterioration in 1775. Another case was the sale of a J. M. W. Turner painting in the collection of Royal Holloway, University of London to the Getty Museum to fund the maintenance of the building, despite the fact that the original benefactor had expressly requested that the collection be kept intact.

Many ethical guidelines for deaccessioning require that the funds generated by disposing of collection items be used only to increase or maintain the remaining collection. For example, the International Council of Museums (ICOM) Code of Ethics states that:

"Money or compensation received from the deaccessioning and disposal of objects and specimens from a museum collection should be used solely for the benefit of the collection and usually for acquisitions to that same collection".

In the United Kingdom, guidelines governing deaccessioning and other ethically difficult issues can be found in the Museums Association's Code of Ethics. In the United States, the guidelines on these matters are issued by the American Alliance of Museums.

The American Alliance of Museums Code of Ethics takes the position that "in no event shall they [deaccessioning proceeds] be used for anything other than acquisition or direct care of collections".

Other museums may have additional restrictions on the use of funds from deaccessioning. For example, at some museums funds from deaccessioning a work of art can only be used to purchase a work of similar style or period (for example, funds from selling a 20th-century American print could not be used to buy a 17th-century Italian painting) and the name of the donor of the sold work remains associated with the purchased artwork.

Selling artwork to fund budget deficits and pay salaries has been compared to "burning down your house to heat the kitchen."

== See also ==
- Archiving
- Conservation and restoration of cultural property
- Content curation
- Curator
- Curatorial platform
- Digital curation
- Weeding (library)
- Endowment invasion
- Museology
- Museum anthropology
- Museum education
- Natural history museum
- Art collection in ancient Rome
