= Endowment invasion =

Endowment invasion is when an institution draws on its financial endowment to pay off debts and cover the yearly operating expenses. In New York the practice requires approval from the state attorney general's office and the New York State Supreme Court. By 2009 most states had adopted Uniform Prudent Management of Institutional Funds Act, a law which allows "invading principal". It is considered a last resort for any institution to stave off closure.

== Examples ==
- From 2003 to 2009 New York City Opera drew down their endowment from $57 million to $16 million to pay off debts and cover annual operating expenses.
- In the 1980s the New-York Historical Society began using money from their endowment to pay their annual operating costs and cover their salaries to the point where by 1988 they had only enough money in their endowment to pay for another 18 months of operating expenses.

== See also ==
- Deaccessioning, the practice of selling museum objects to cover expenses
- List of wealthiest charitable foundations
