= List of the Mesozoic life of Oregon =

This list of the Mesozoic life of Oregon contains the various prehistoric life-forms whose fossilized remains have been reported from within the US state of Oregon and are between 252.17 and 66 million years of age.

== A ==
- †Acanthocircus
  - †Acanthocircus carinatus – or unidentified related form
  - †Acanthocircus rotundus – or unidentified related form
- †Acanthodiscus
  - †Acanthodiscus subradiatus – or unidentified related form
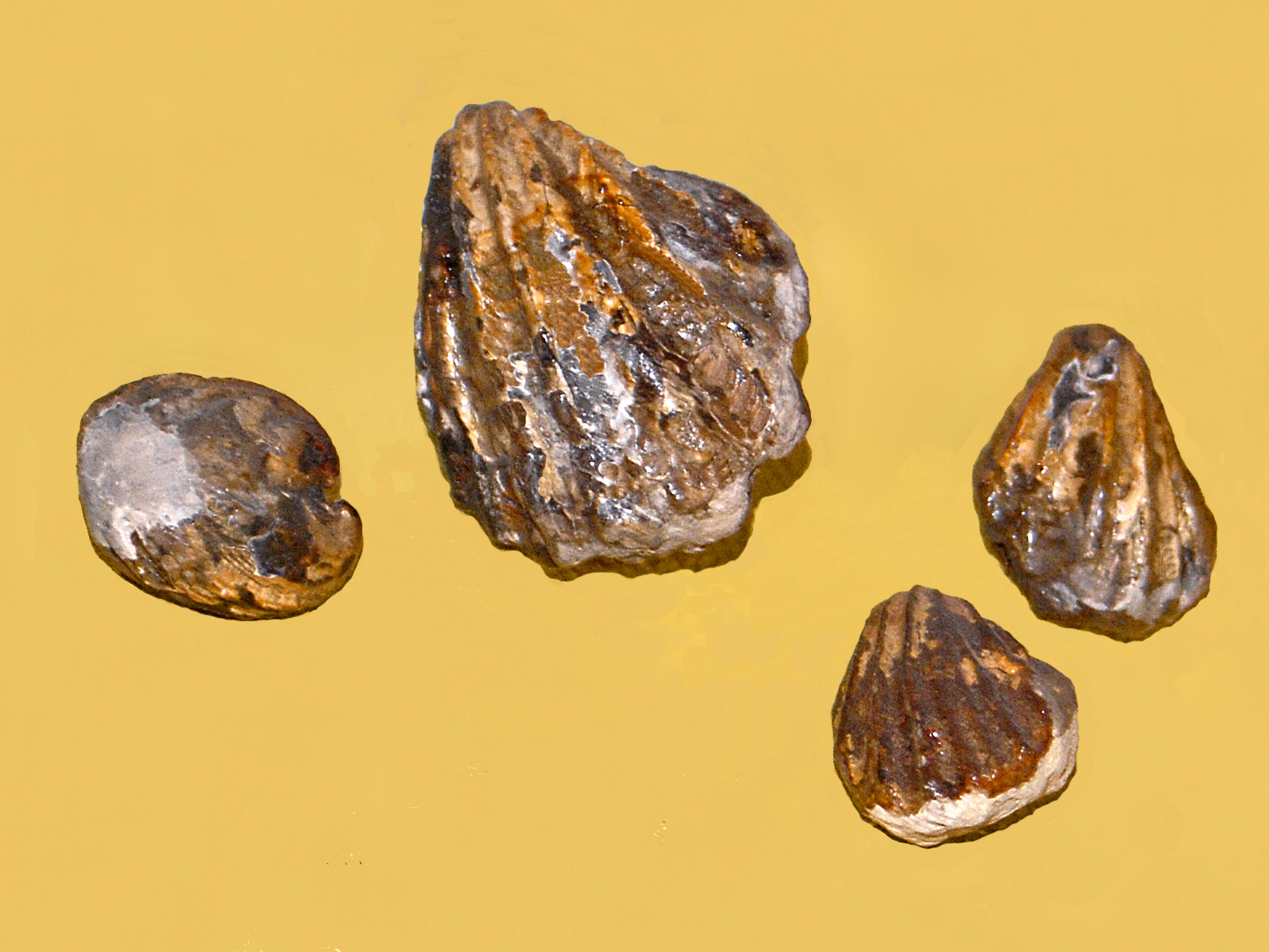
- Fossilized shells of the Early-Late Cretaceous marine bivalve Actinoceramus
  †Actinoceramus
  - †Actinoceramus salomoni
  - †Actinoceramus subsulcatus
  - †Actinoceramus sulcatus
- †Agerchlamys
  - †Agerchlamys boellingi
- †Alpinophragmium – tentative report
- †Amblysiphonella
  - †Amblysiphonella steinmanni – or unidentified comparable form
  - †Amblysiphonella timorica
- †Ampakabastraea
  - †Ampakabastraea cowichanensis
- †Anahamulina
  - †Anahamulina wilcoxensis
- †Anatropites
- †Andrazella
- †Angulobracchia
  - †Angulobracchia bulbosa
- †Anoptychia
  - †Anoptychia oregonensis – type locality for species
- †Antexitus – type locality for genus
  - †Antexitus inusitatus – type locality for species
  - †Antexitus pessagnoi – type locality for species
  - †Antexitus southforkensis – type locality for species
  - †Antexitus yangi – type locality for species
- †Anthostylis
  - †Anthostylis acanthophora – or unidentified comparable form
- †Antiquilima
- †Apiotrigonia
  - †Apiotrigonia condoni
- †Arcavicula – tentative report
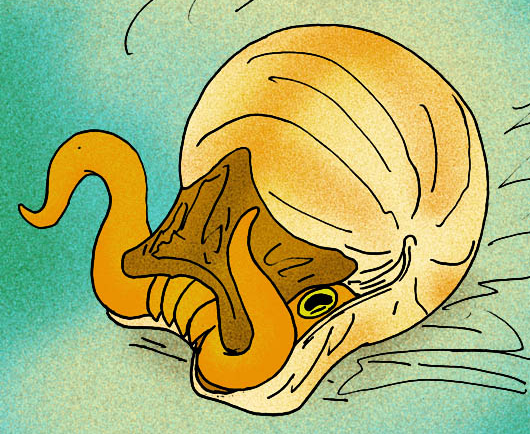
- Life restoration of two species of the Late Triassic ammonoid cephalopod Arcestes
  †Arcestes
  - †Arcestes gigantogaleatus – or unidentified comparable form
- †Archaeocenosphaera
  - †Archaeocenosphaera laseekensis
- †Archaeodictyomitra
  - †Archaeodictyomitra exigua
  - †Archaeodictyomitra primigena
- †Archaeohagiastrum
  - †Archaeohagiastrum munitum – or unidentified related form
  - †Archaeohagiastrum oregonense – type locality for species
- †Archaeospongoprunum
  - †Archaeospongoprunum helense
  - †Archaeospongoprunum praeimlayi
- †Arietoceltites
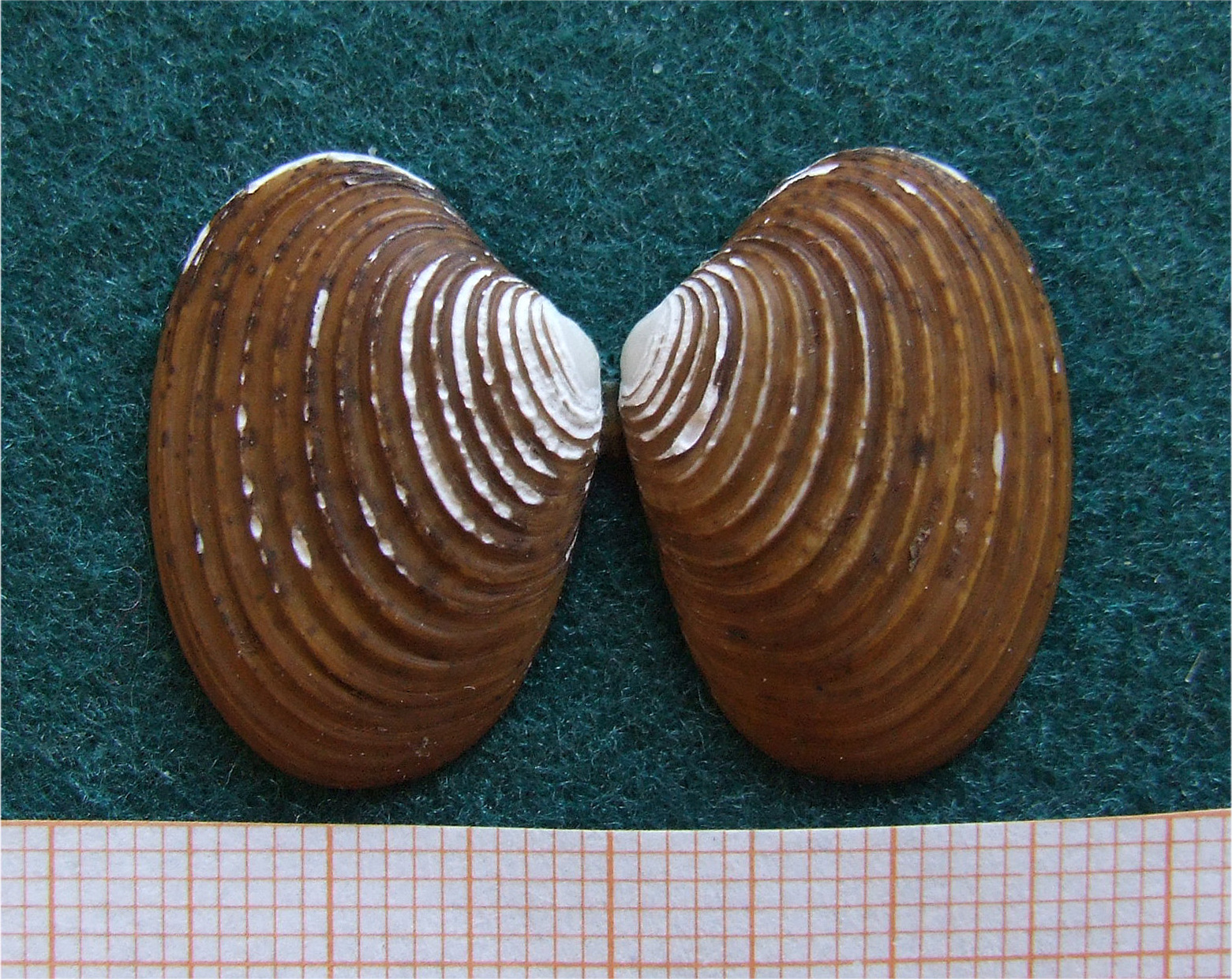
- Shell of a modern Astarte bivalve
  Astarte
- †Astraeomorpha
  - †Astraeomorpha confusa
  - †Astraeomorpha crassisepta
- †Austrisaturnalis
  - †Austrisaturnalis quadriradiatus – or unidentified related form

== B ==
- †Baccanella
- †Badouxia
  - †Badouxia canadensis – type locality for species
  - †Badouxia columbiae
- †Barbuta
  - †Barbuta senecaensis – type locality for species
- †Bennettazhia
  - †Bennettazhia oregonensis – type locality for species
- †Bistarkum
  - †Bistarkum bifurcum – type locality for species
  - †Bistarkum rigidium – type locality for species
  - †Bistarkum saginatum – type locality for species
- †Broctus
  - †Broctus ruesti – type locality for species
- †Buchia
  - †Buchia pacifica
  - †Buchia piochii
  - †Buchia uncitoides – or unidentified comparable form
- †Bulbocyrtium
  - †Bulbocyrtium tubum – type locality for species

== C ==
- Cadulus
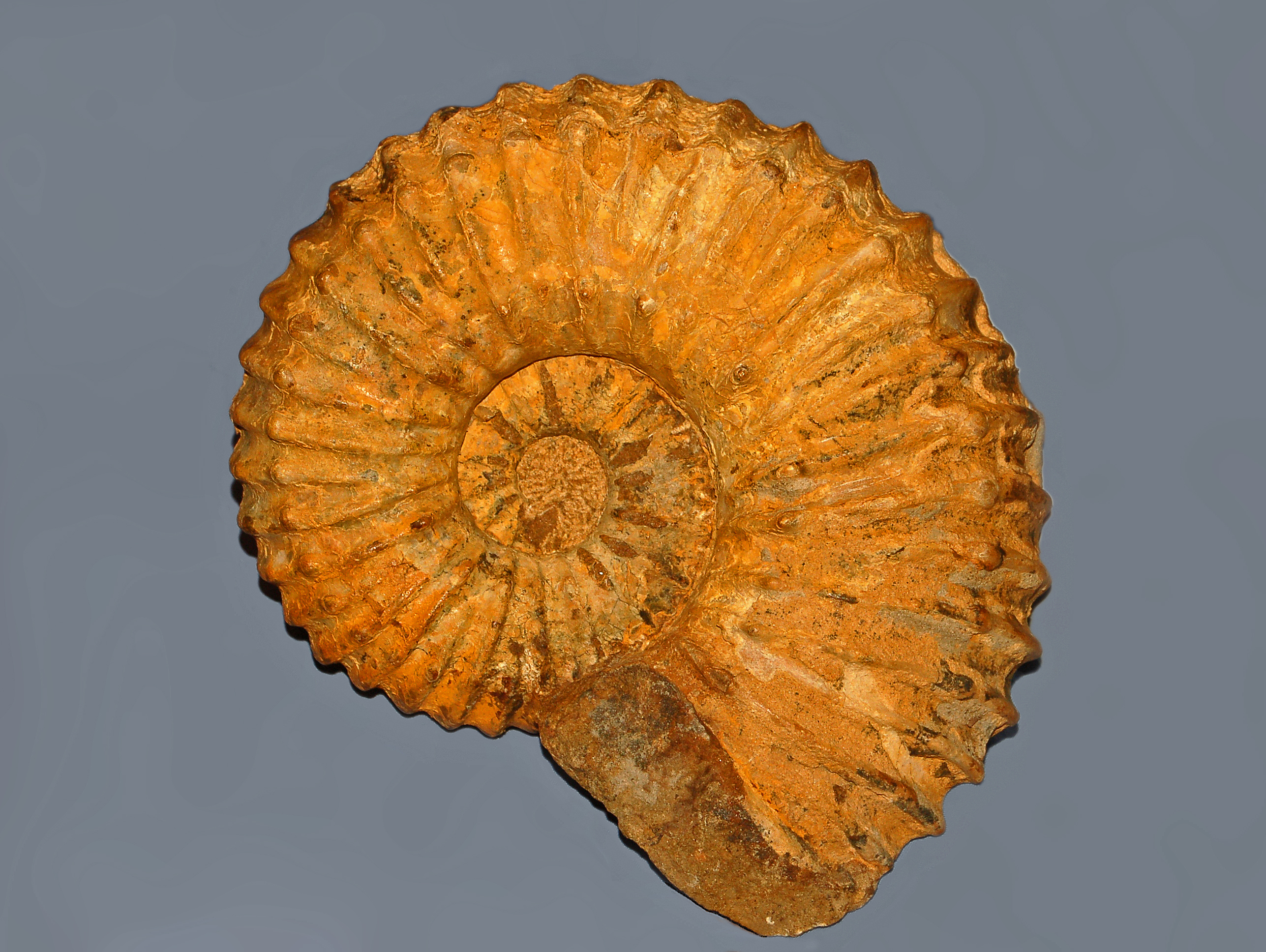
- Fossilized shell of the Late Cretaceous ammonoid cephalopod Calycoceras
  †Calycoceras
  - †Calycoceras naviculare – type locality for species
- †Camptonectes
- †Canelonus
  - †Canelonus conus – or unidentified comparable form
- †Canoptum
  - †Canoptum anulatum
  - †Canoptum artum – type locality for species
  - †Canoptum macoyense – or unidentified comparable form
  - †Canoptum merum
  - †Canoptum poissoni
  - †Canoptum praeanulatum
  - †Canoptum spinosum – type locality for species
- †Cantalum
- †Canutus
  - †Canutus fusus – type locality for species
  - †Canutus giganteus
  - †Canutus indomitus
  - †Canutus nitidus – type locality for species
  - †Canutus rockfishensis
- †Capnodoce
  - †Capnodoce anapetes – or unidentified related form
  - †Capnodoce angusta – type locality for species
  - †Capnodoce antiqua – type locality for species
  - †Capnodoce baldiensis – type locality for species
  - †Capnodoce beaulieui – type locality for species
  - †Capnodoce copiosa – type locality for species
  - †Capnodoce extenta – type locality for species
  - †Capnodoce fragilis – type locality for species
  - †Capnodoce gracilis – type locality for species
  - †Capnodoce insueta – type locality for species
  - †Capnodoce kochi – type locality for species
  - †Capnodoce malaca – type locality for species
  - †Capnodoce media – type locality for species
  - †Capnodoce minuscula – type locality for species
  - †Capnodoce minuta – type locality for species
  - †Capnodoce sinuosa – type locality for species
  - †Capnodoce traversi
- †Capnuchosphaera
  - †Capnuchosphaera colemani – type locality for species
  - †Capnuchosphaera deweveri
  - †Capnuchosphaera schenki – type locality for species
  - †Capnuchosphaera silviesensis – type locality for species
  - †Capnuchosphaera smithorum – type locality for species
  - †Capnuchosphaera sockensis – type locality for species
  - †Capnuchosphaera soldierensis – type locality for species
  - †Capnuchosphaera texensis – type locality for species
- Cardinia
- †Cardinioides
  - †Cardinioides josephus
- †Cassianella
  - †Cassianella angusta
- †Catoma – type locality for genus
  - †Catoma concinna – type locality for species
  - †Catoma geometrica – type locality for species
  - †Catoma inedita – type locality for species
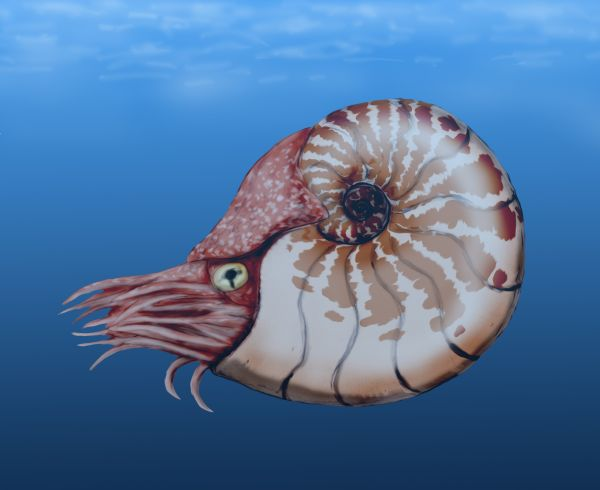
- Life restoration of the Late Triassic-Middle Jurassic nautiloid cephalopod Cenoceras
  †Cenoceras
  - †Cenoceras lupheri – type locality for species
- †Ceriostella
- †Charlottea
  - †Charlottea carterae – type locality for species
  - †Charlottea weedensis – or unidentified comparable form
- Chlamys
  - †Chlamys mojsisovicsi
- †Chondrocoenia
  - †Chondrocoenia paradoxa
- †Cleoniceras – tentative report
  - †Cleoniceras dilleri – type locality for species
- †Coccophyllum – tentative report
- †Coelastarte
- †Coenastraea
  - †Coenastraea hyatti
- †Colospongia
  - †Colospongia utriculus
- †Corum
  - †Corum candidum – type locality for species
  - †Corum parvum – type locality for species
- †Crassistella
  - †Crassistella juvavica
  - †Crassistella vesiculosa – or unidentified comparable form
- †Crenamussium
  - †Crenamussium concentricum
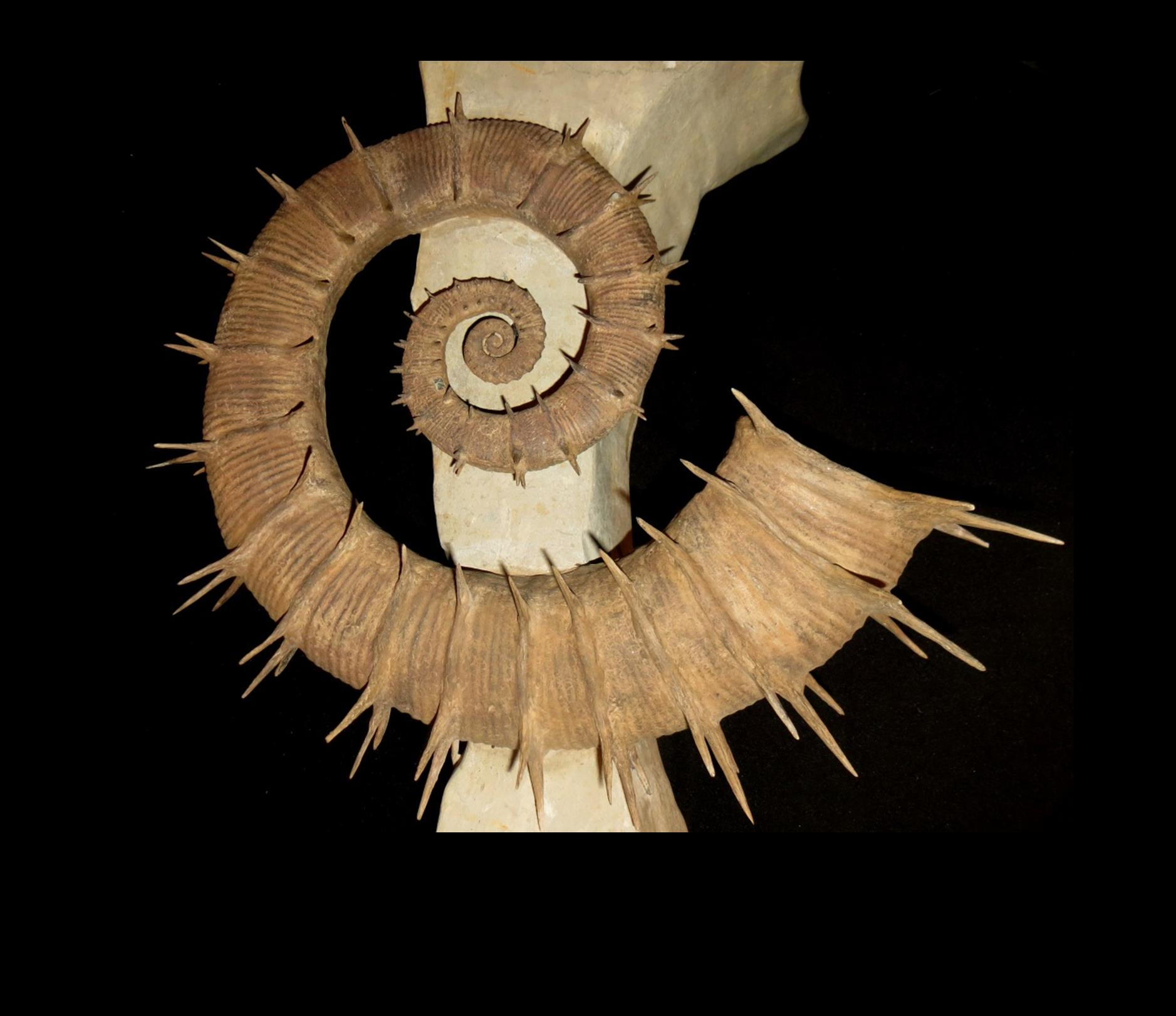
- Fossilized shell of the Early Cretaceous ammonoid cephalopod Crioceratites
  †Crioceratites
- †Crubus
  - †Crubus chengi – type locality for species
  - †Crubus firmus – type locality for species
- †Crucella
  - †Crucella angulosa – or unidentified comparable form
  - †Crucella beata – type locality for species
  - †Crucella concinna – type locality for species
  - †Crucella jadeae – type locality for species
  - †Crucella theokaftensis – or unidentified comparable form
- †Cryptocoelia
- †Cuifastraea
  - †Cuifastraea granulata
- †Cyathocoenia
  - †Cyathocoenia gerthi – or unidentified comparable form

== D ==
- Dentalium
  - †Dentalium stentor
- †Diceratigalea
  - †Diceratigalea mirus
  - †Diceratigalea venustus
- †Dichotomites
- †Diplotremina
- †Discamphiceras
  - †Discamphiceras ornatum – type locality for species
- †Discosiphonella
- †Discotropites
- †Distichophyllia
  - †Distichophyllia norica
- †Droltus
  - †Droltus probosus
  - †Droltus sanignacioensis
- †Drulanta
  - †Drulanta bella – type locality for species
  - †Drulanta pulchra – type locality for species

== E ==
- †Elodium – tentative report
  - †Elodium mackenziei
- †Elysastraea
  - †Elysastraea profunda
- †Emiluvia
  - †Emiluvia bacata – type locality for species
  - †Emiluvia brevispina – type locality for species
  - †Emiluvia goricanae – type locality for species
  - †Emiluvia kozuri – type locality for species
  - †Emiluvia oregonensis – type locality for species
  - †Emiluvia parvinodosa – type locality for species
  - †Emiluvia pessagnoi
- †Empirea
- †Endostoma
- †Entolium
  - †Entolium ceruleus – type locality for species
- †Eocomoseris
  - †Eocomoseris ramosa
- †Erugonia
  - †Erugonia canyonensis

== F ==
- †Fantus
  - †Fantus exiguus – type locality for species
  - †Fantus schoolhousensis – type locality for species
- †Farcus
  - †Farcus graylockensis
  - †Farcus kozuri – type locality for species
  - †Farcus lepidus – type locality for species
  - †Farcus lipidus – or unidentified comparable form
  - †Farcus multidorsus – type locality for species
- †Fenestrula
  - †Fenestrula jurassica – type locality for species
  - †Fenestrula oregonensis – type locality for species
- †Franziceras
  - †Franziceras graylockense – type locality for species
- †Frenguelliella – tentative report

== G ==
- †Gablonzeria
  - †Gablonzeria profunda
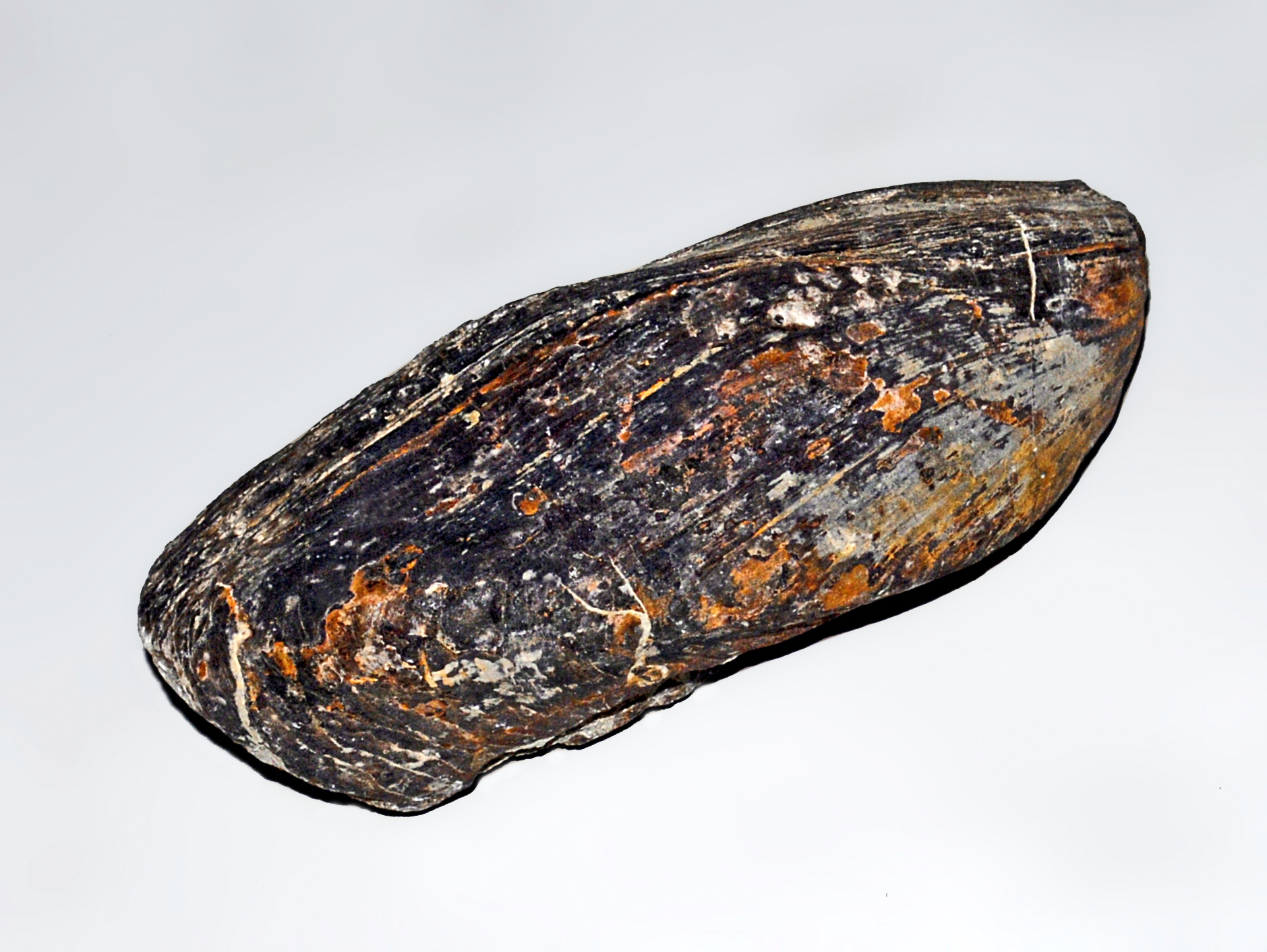
- Fossilized shell of the Carboniferous-Eocene bivalve Gervillia
  †Gervillia
  - †Gervillia angusta
- †Gorgansium
  - †Gorgansium beaverense – type locality for species
  - †Gorgansium browni – type locality for species
  - †Gorgansium morganense
  - †Gorgansium silviesense
  - †Gorgansium thayeri – type locality for species
  - †Gorgansium vallieri
  - †Gorgansium yangi – type locality for species
- †Grammatodon
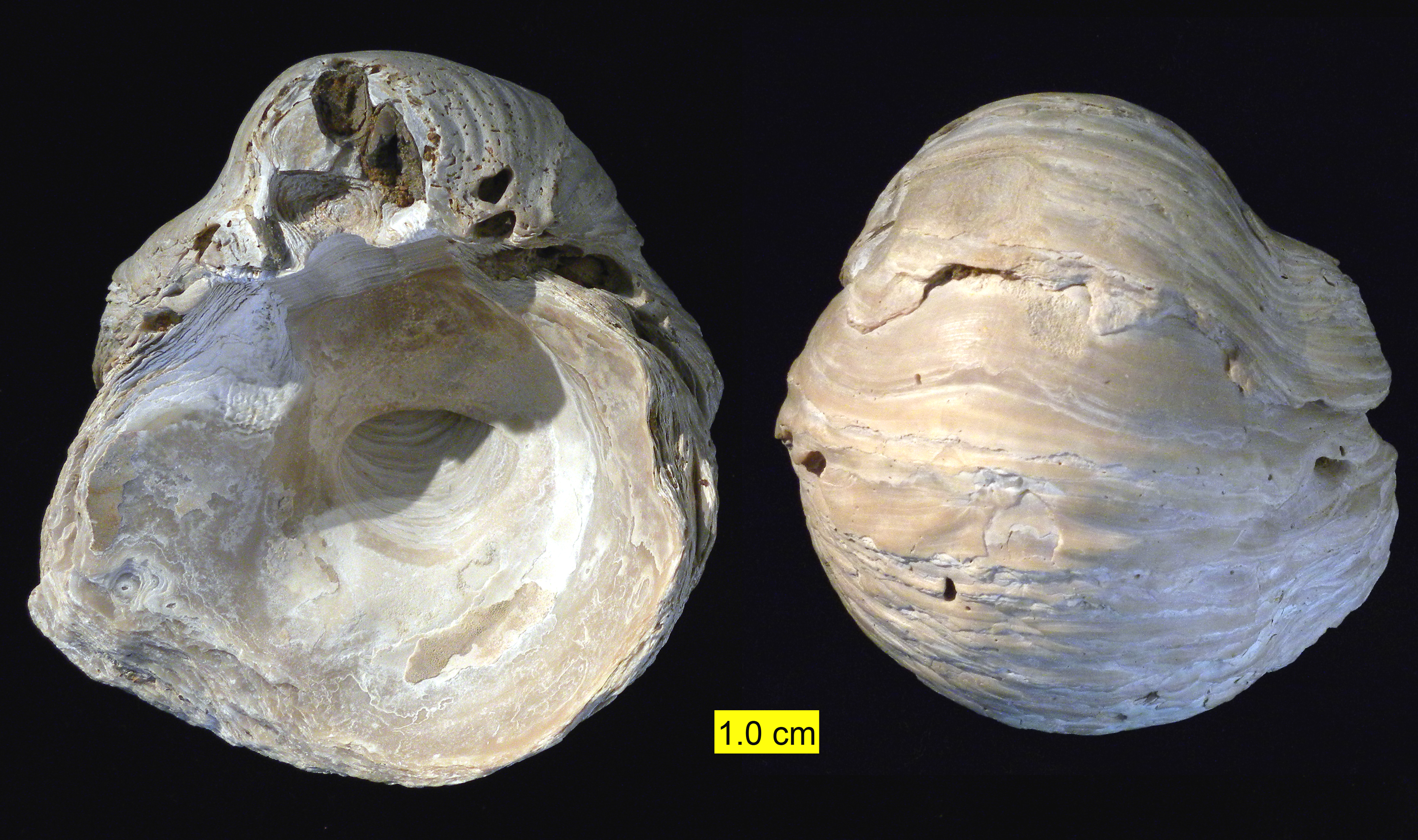
- Interior and exterior of a fossilized shell of the Late Triassic-Eocene marine bivalve Gryphaea
  †Gryphaea
  - †Gryphaea arcuataeformis

== H ==
- †Hagiastrum
  - †Hagiastrum macrum – type locality for species
  - †Hagiastrum majusculum
- †Hajarispongia
  - †Hajarispongia whaleni – type locality for species
- †Halobia
  - †Halobia beyrichi
  - †Halobia dilatata
  - †Halobia halorica
  - †Halobia oregonensis – type locality for species
  - †Halobia radiata
  - †Halobia salinarum
  - †Halobia superba
- †Halorella
- †Hannaites
  - †Hannaites riddlensis
  - †Hannaites truncatus
- †Hannaoceras
- †Hemicryptocapsa
- †Heptastylis
  - †Heptastylis aquilae
  - †Heptastylis oregonensis
- †Hetalum – type locality for genus
  - †Hetalum brevilabrum – type locality for species
- †Higumastra
  - †Higumastra angustabraccia – type locality for species
  - †Higumastra exigua – type locality for species
  - †Higumastra hui – type locality for species
  - †Higumastra inflata – or unidentified comparable form
  - †Higumastra laxa – type locality for species
  - †Higumastra lupheri – type locality for species
  - †Higumastra obesabraccia – type locality for species
  - †Higumastra transversa
- †Hilarisirex
  - †Hilarisirex oregonensis
- †Hiscocapsa
  - †Hiscocapsa funatoensis
  - †Hiscocapsa matsuokai – type locality for species
  - †Hiscocapsa minuta – type locality for species
- †Hollisites
  - †Hollisites dichotomus – type locality for species
- †Homoeoparonaella
  - †Homoeoparonaella elegans
  - †Homoeoparonaella hydensis – type locality for species
- †Homolsomites
  - †Homolsomites stantoni
- †Hoplocrioceras
  - †Hoplocrioceras remondi – or unidentified comparable form
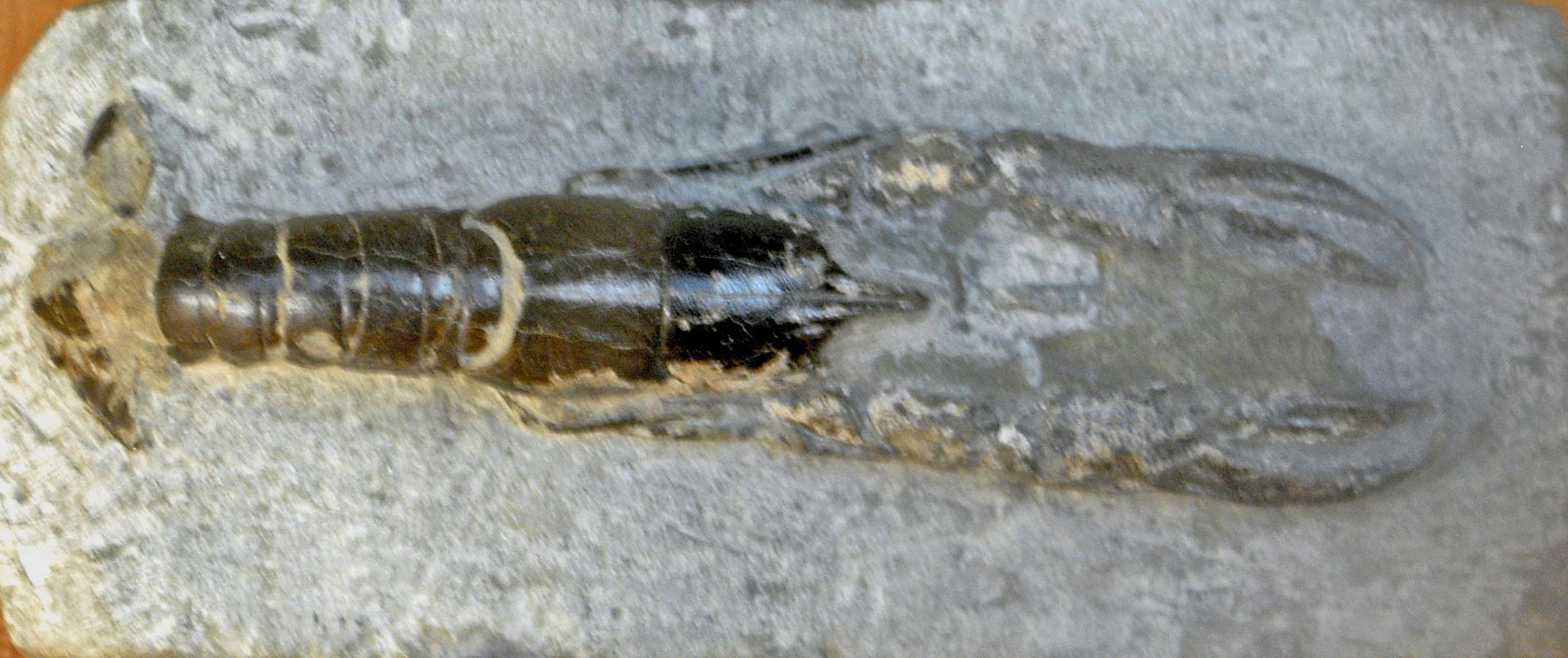
- Fossil of the Jurassic-Paleogene lobster Hoploparia
  †Hoploparia
  - †Hoploparia riddlensis – type locality for species
- †Hsuum
  - †Hsuum acutum – type locality for species
  - †Hsuum belliatulum
  - †Hsuum brevicostatum
  - †Hsuum gratum – type locality for species
  - †Hsuum lucidum – type locality for species
  - †Hsuum lupheri
  - †Hsuum mirabundum
  - †Hsuum modicum – type locality for species
  - †Hsuum parasolense
  - †Hsuum parvulum – type locality for species
  - †Hsuum robustum
  - †Hsuum rosebudense
- †Hyphantoceras
  - †Hyphantoceras ceratopse – tentative report
  - †Hyphantoceras irregulare – tentative report
- †Hypophylloceras
  - †Hypophylloceras onoense – or unidentified related form
  - †Hypophylloceras onoensis – or unidentified related form

== I ==
- †Icrioma
  - †Icrioma praecipua – type locality for species
  - †Icrioma transversa – type locality for species
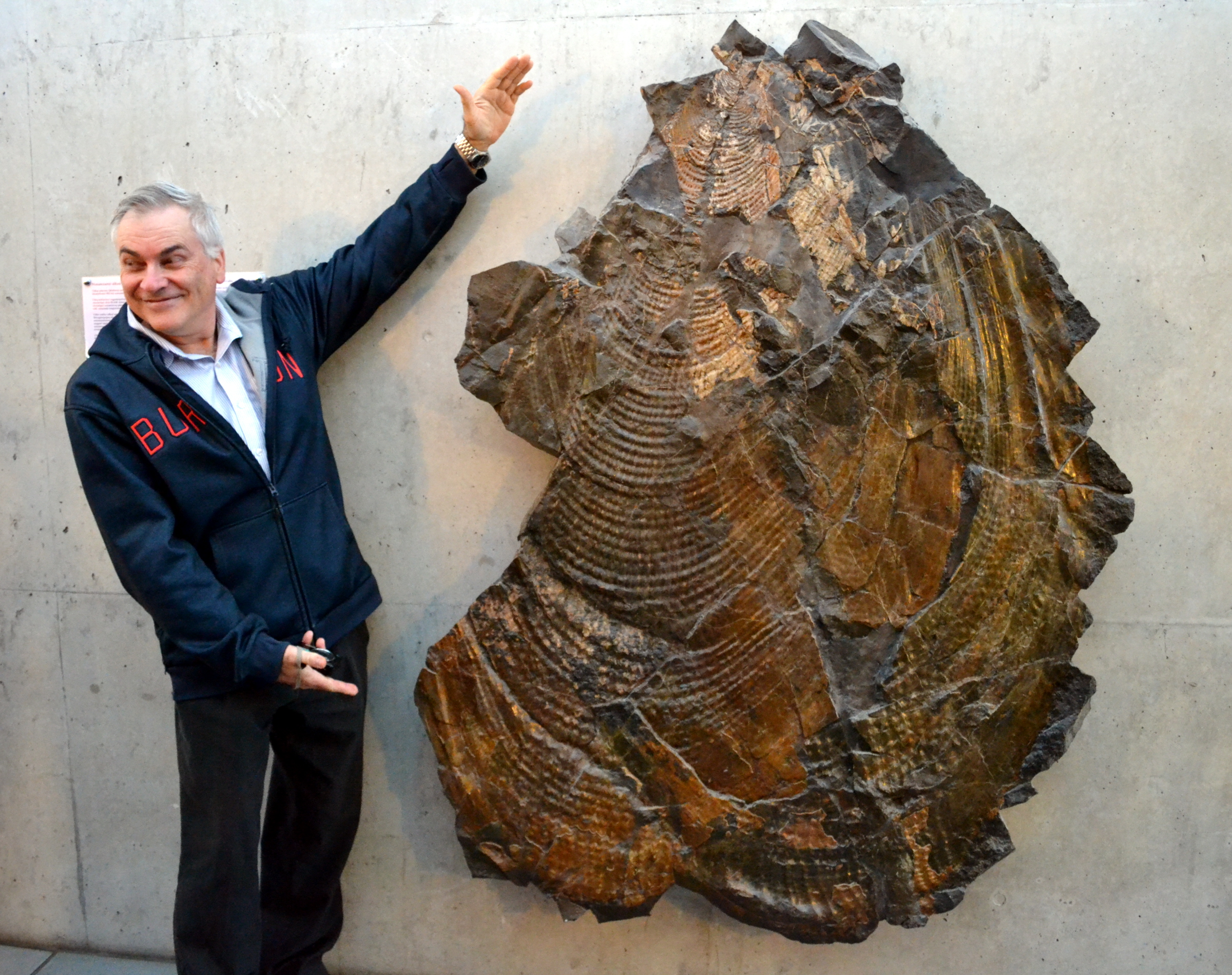
- Fossilized shell of the Early Jurassic-Late Cretaceous marine bivalve Inoceramus with a human indicating its size
  †Inoceramus
- †Isocyprina

== J ==
- †Jaworskiella
  - †Jaworskiella supleiensis – type locality for species
- †Justium – type locality for genus
  - †Justium medium – type locality for species
  - †Justium novum – type locality for species
  - †Justium robustum – type locality for species

== K ==
- †Kahlerosphaera
- †Katroma
  - †Katroma angusta – type locality for species
  - †Katroma bicornus – type locality for species
  - †Katroma clara – type locality for species
  - †Katroma inflata – type locality for species
  - †Katroma ninstintsi
  - †Katroma pinquitudo – or unidentified comparable form
- †Kilianella
  - †Kilianella besairiei – or unidentified comparable form
- †Krumbeckiella – tentative report
  - †Krumbeckiella timorensis – tentative report
- †Kuhnastraea
  - †Kuhnastraea decussata
  - †Kuhnastraea incrassata

== L ==
- †Lantus
  - †Lantus obesus – type locality for species
  - †Lantus sixi – type locality for species
- †Lanubus
  - †Lanubus alatus – type locality for species
  - †Lanubus dickinsoni
  - †Lanubus hattorii – type locality for species
  - †Lanubus holdsworthi
  - †Lanubus purus
- †Laxuscingula – type locality for genus
  - †Laxuscingula obesa
- †Leugeo
  - †Leugeo hullae – type locality for species
  - †Leugeo ordinarius
  - †Leugeo parvispinata
- Lima
  - †Lima spinigera
- †Liostrea
  - †Liostrea newelli
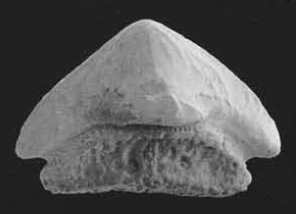
- Electron micrograph of fossilized teeth from the Early Jurassic-Early Cretaceous freshwater shark Lissodus
  †Lissodus
  - †Lissodus weltoni – type locality for species
- †Lithiotis
  - †Lithiotis problematica
- †Loffa
  - †Loffa lepida – type locality for species
  - †Loffa vesterensis – type locality for species
- Lopha
- †Lucina
- †Lupherium
  - †Lupherium nitidum
  - †Lupherium snowshoense
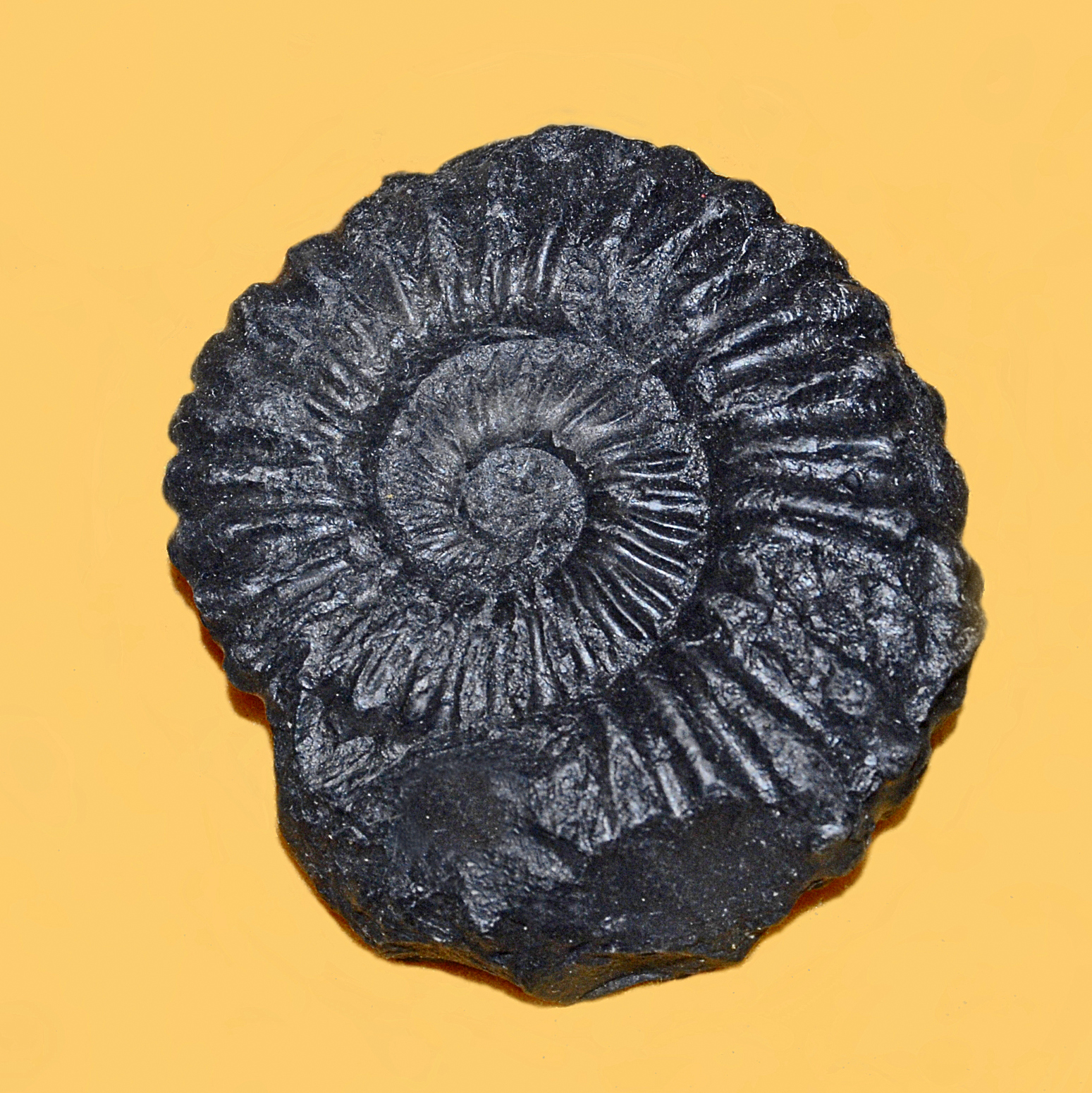
- Fossilized shell of the Early Cretaceous ammonoid cephalopod Lyelliceras
  †Lyelliceras
- †Lytoceras
  - †Lytoceras aulaeum

== M ==
- †Maeandrostylis
  - †Maeandrostylis grandiseptus – type locality for species
  - †Maeandrostylis vancouverensis
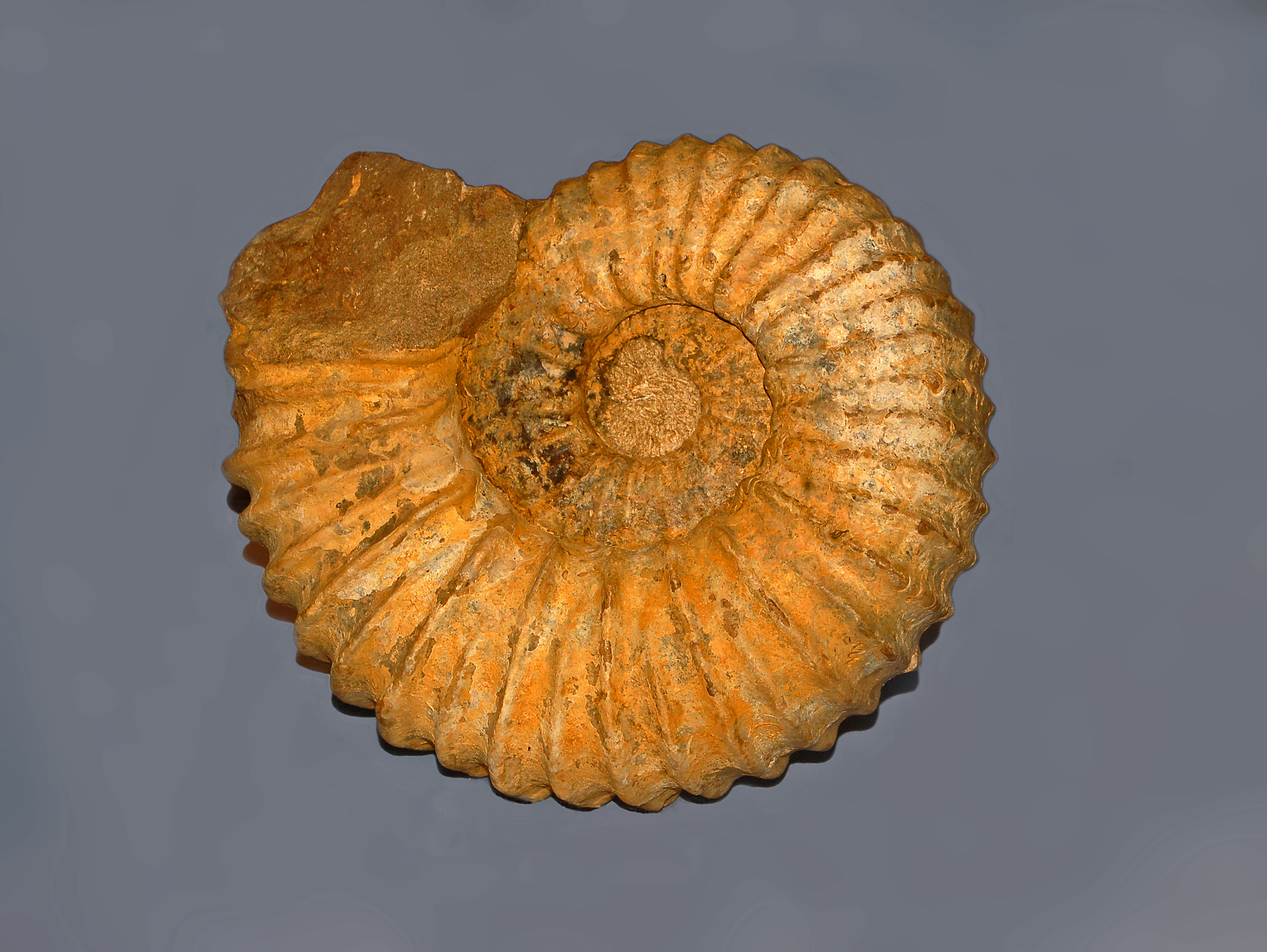
- Fossilized shell of the Late Cretaceous ammonoid cephalopod Mantelliceras
  †Mantelliceras
  - †Mantelliceras phoenixense – type locality for species
- †Margarastraea
  - †Margarastraea pulchra – type locality for species
- †Margarosmilia – report made of unidentified related form or using admittedly obsolete nomenclature
  - †Margarosmilia confluens
- †Meleagrinella
- †Metapolygnathus
  - †Metapolygnathus nodosus
- Milax
  - †Milax alienus
  - †Milax flexuosus
- Miliolipora
- †Minetrigonia
- †Minutusolla – type locality for genus
  - †Minutusolla yaoi – type locality for species

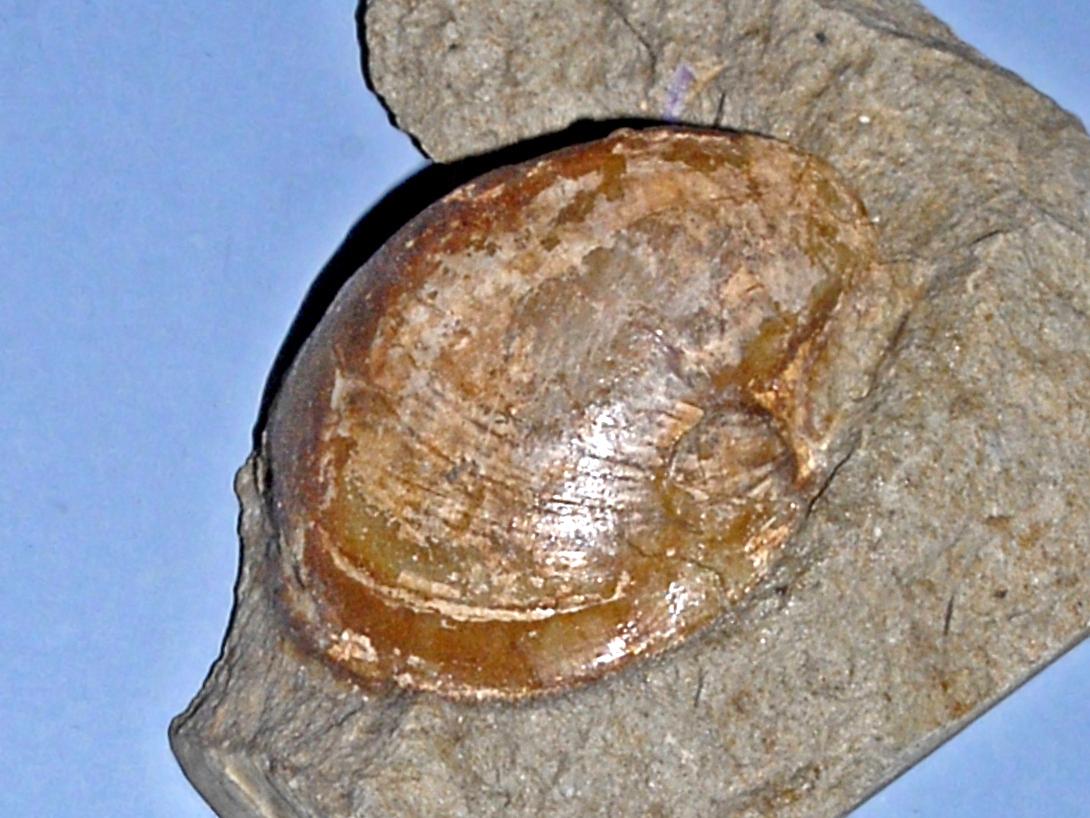
Fossilized shell of the Devonian-modern marine bivalve Modiolus, or horsemussel

†Modiolus

- †Monotis
  - †Monotis subcircularis
- †Montlivaltia – report made of unidentified related form or using admittedly obsolete nomenclature
- †Multimonilis – type locality for genus
  - †Multimonilis pulcher – type locality for species
  - †Multimonilis splendidus – or unidentified comparable form
- †Myophorella
  - †Myophorella argo – or unidentified comparable form
  - †Myophorella freboldi – type locality for species
- †Myophorigonia
  - †Myophorigonia kobayashii
- †Mysidiella
  - †Mysidiella americana – or unidentified comparable form
  - †Mysidiella cordillerana
- †Mysidioptera
  - †Mysidioptera spinigera
  - †Mysidioptera williamsi

== N ==
- Napora
  - †Napora antelopensis
  - †Napora aperta – type locality for species
  - †Napora baumgartneri
  - †Napora bearensis
  - †Napora cerromesaensis
  - †Napora cosmica – or unidentified related form
  - †Napora insolita
  - †Napora milleri
  - †Napora morganensis
  - †Napora opaca
  - †Napora proba – type locality for species
  - †Napora propria – type locality for species
  - †Napora relica – type locality for species
- †Neoconocaryomma – type locality for genus
  - †Neoconocaryomma acusspina – type locality for species
  - †Neoconocaryomma mixtura – type locality for species
  - †Neoconocaryomma tantulimamma – type locality for species
  - †Neoconocaryomma tripalmaspina – type locality for species
- †Neogondolella
- †Neowrangellium
  - †Neowrangellium pessagnoi – type locality for species
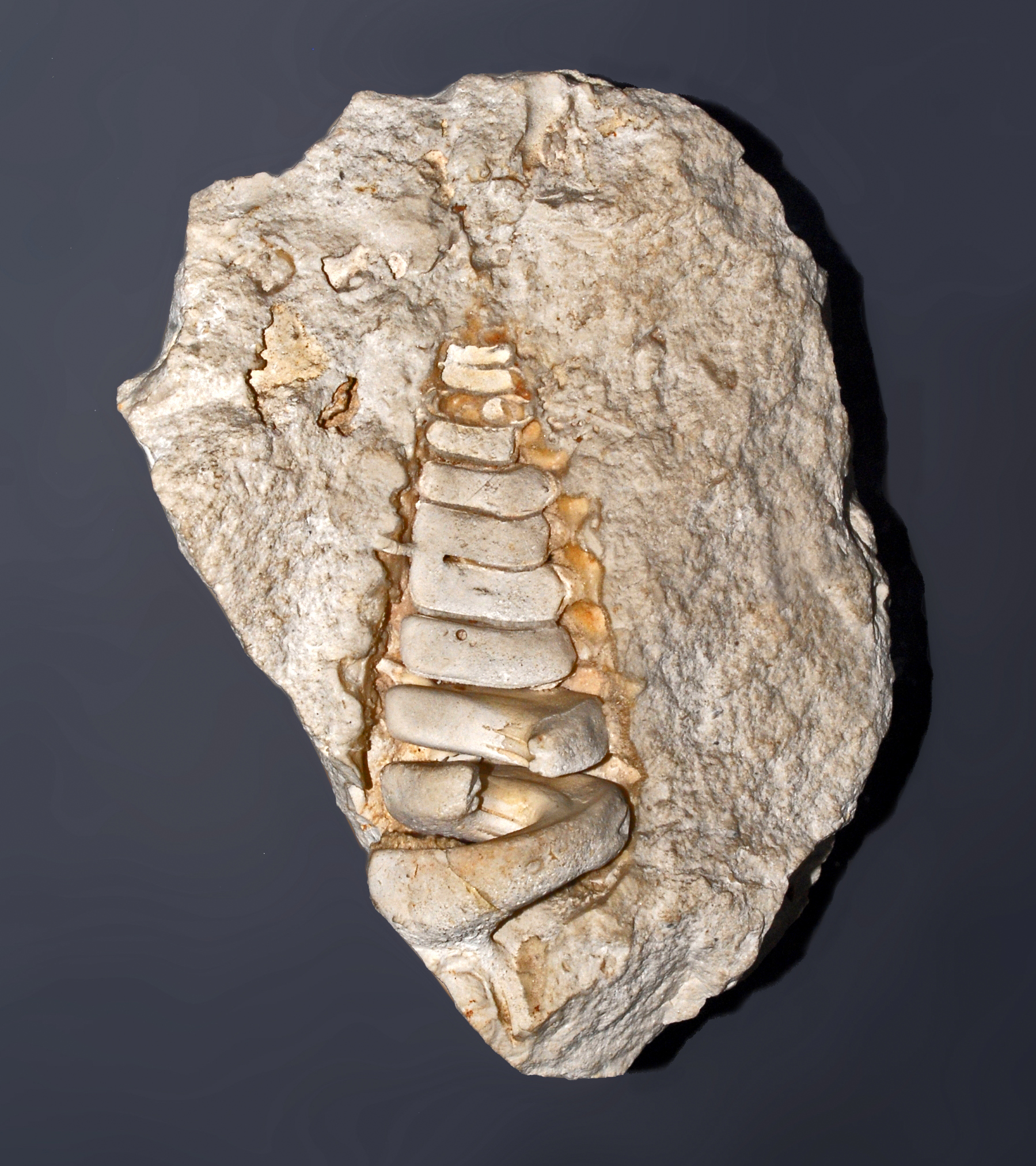
- Fossilized shell of the Jurassic-Cretaceous sea snail Nerinea
  †Nerinea
- †Nevadaphyllites
  - †Nevadaphyllites compressus
- Nodosaria – or unidentified comparable form
- †Noritus
  - †Noritus lillihornensis – or unidentified comparable form
  - †Noritus pauxillus
  - †Noritus tenuis – type locality for species
- Nucinella – or unidentified comparable form

== O ==
- †Occidentocerithium – type locality for genus
  - †Occidentocerithium panthalassicum – type locality for species
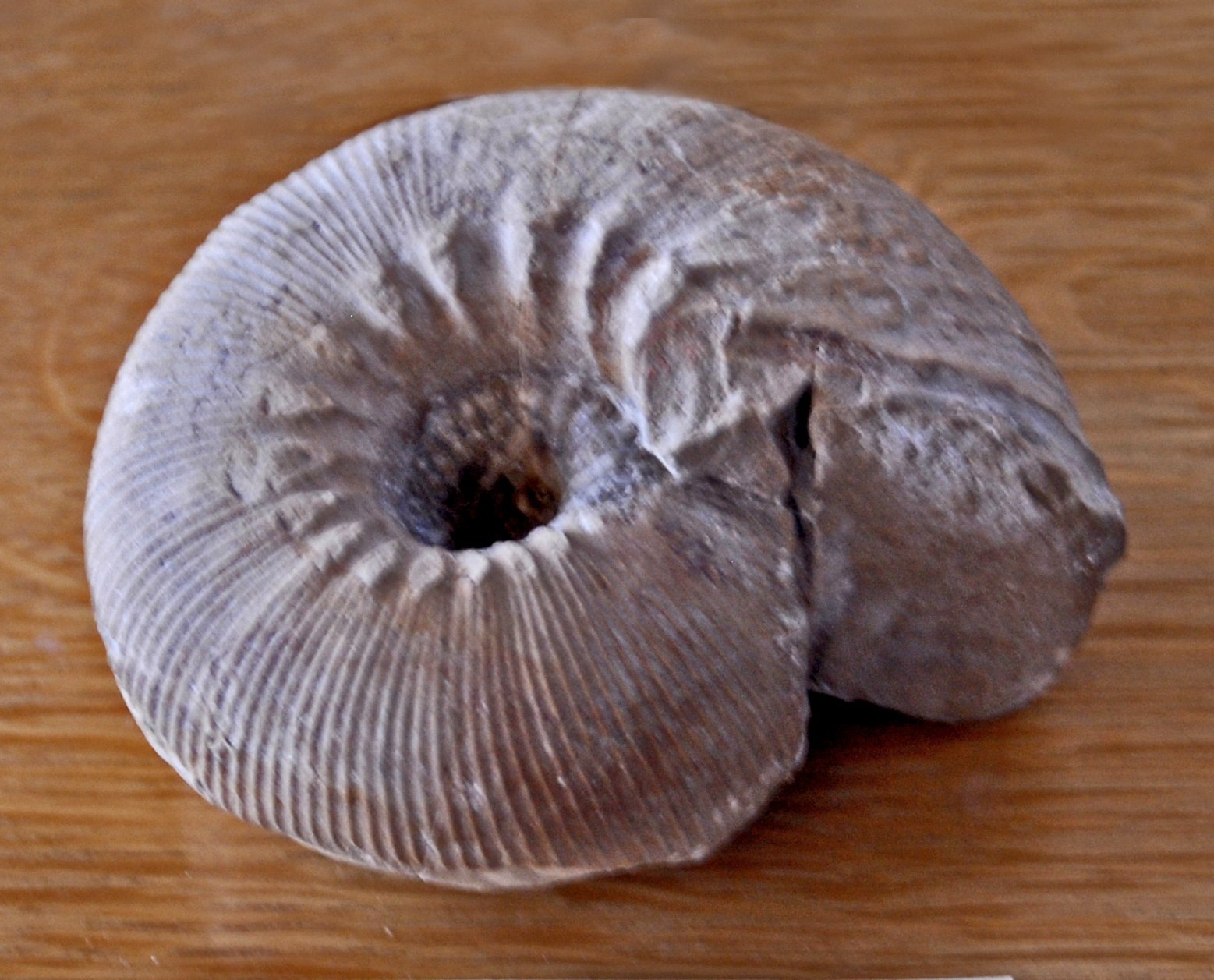
- Fossilized shell of the Early Cretaceous ammonoid cephalopod Olcostephanus
  †Olcostephanus
  - †Olcostephanus pecki
  - †Olcostephanus popenoei
- †Ophthalmidium
- †Oppelismilia
- †Orbiculiforma
  - †Orbiculiforma densaora – type locality for species
  - †Orbiculiforma hexagonaora – type locality for species
  - †Orbiculiforma iniqua
  - †Orbiculiforma librataspira – type locality for species
  - †Orbiculiforma multifora – or unidentified related form
  - †Orbiculiforma sentarota – type locality for species
- †Orbiculiformella
  - †Orbiculiformella callosa
  - †Orbiculiformella trispina – type locality for species
- †Oregoniceras
  - †Oregoniceras jacksonense – type locality for species
  - †Oregoniceras jillsoni – type locality for species
  - †Oregoniceras multicostum
  - †Oregoniceras phoenixense – type locality for species
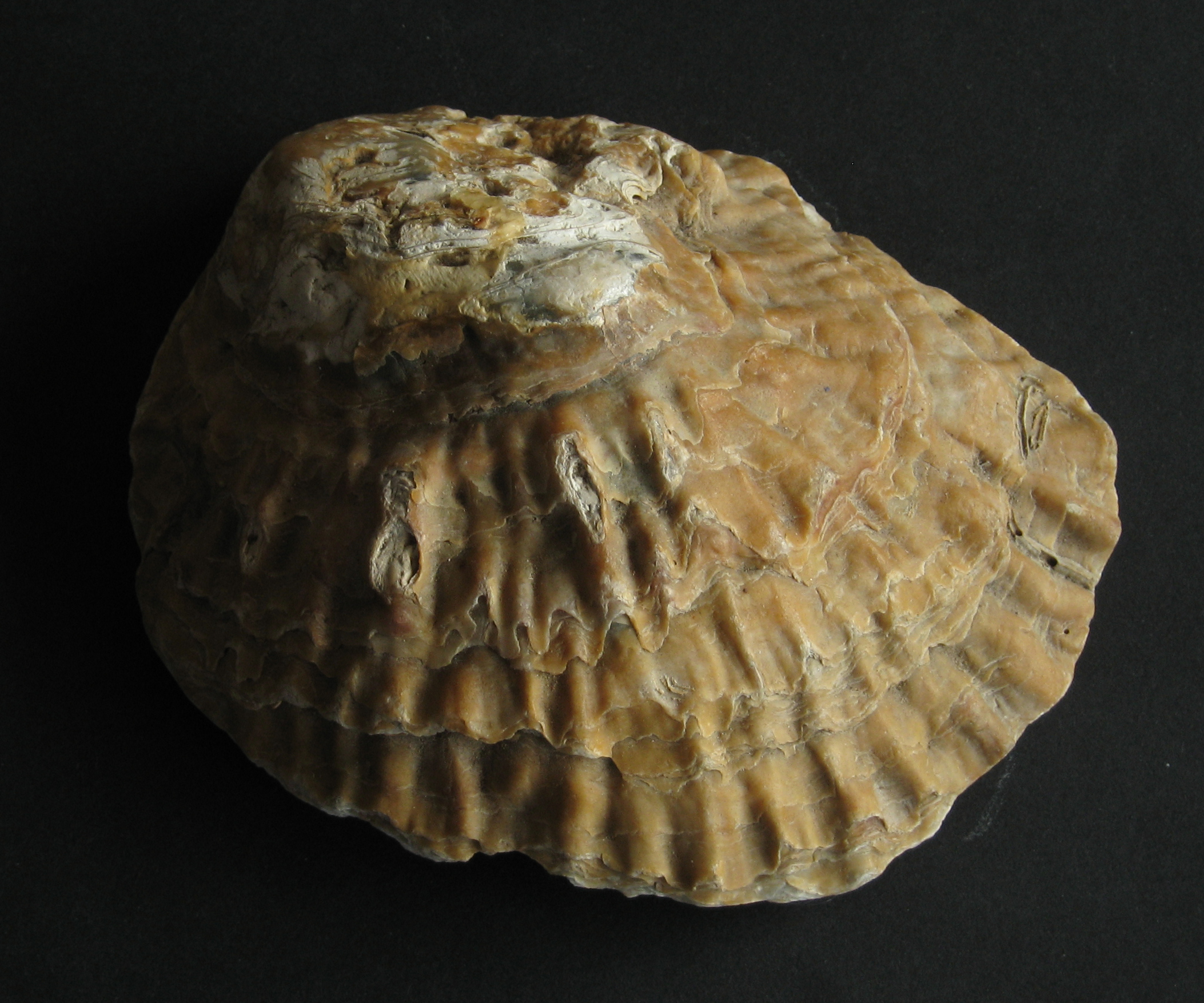
- Shell of an Ostrea, or oyster
  Ostrea
- †Otoscaphites
  - †Otoscaphites perrini
- †Oxytropidoceras

== P ==
- †Pachus – tentative report
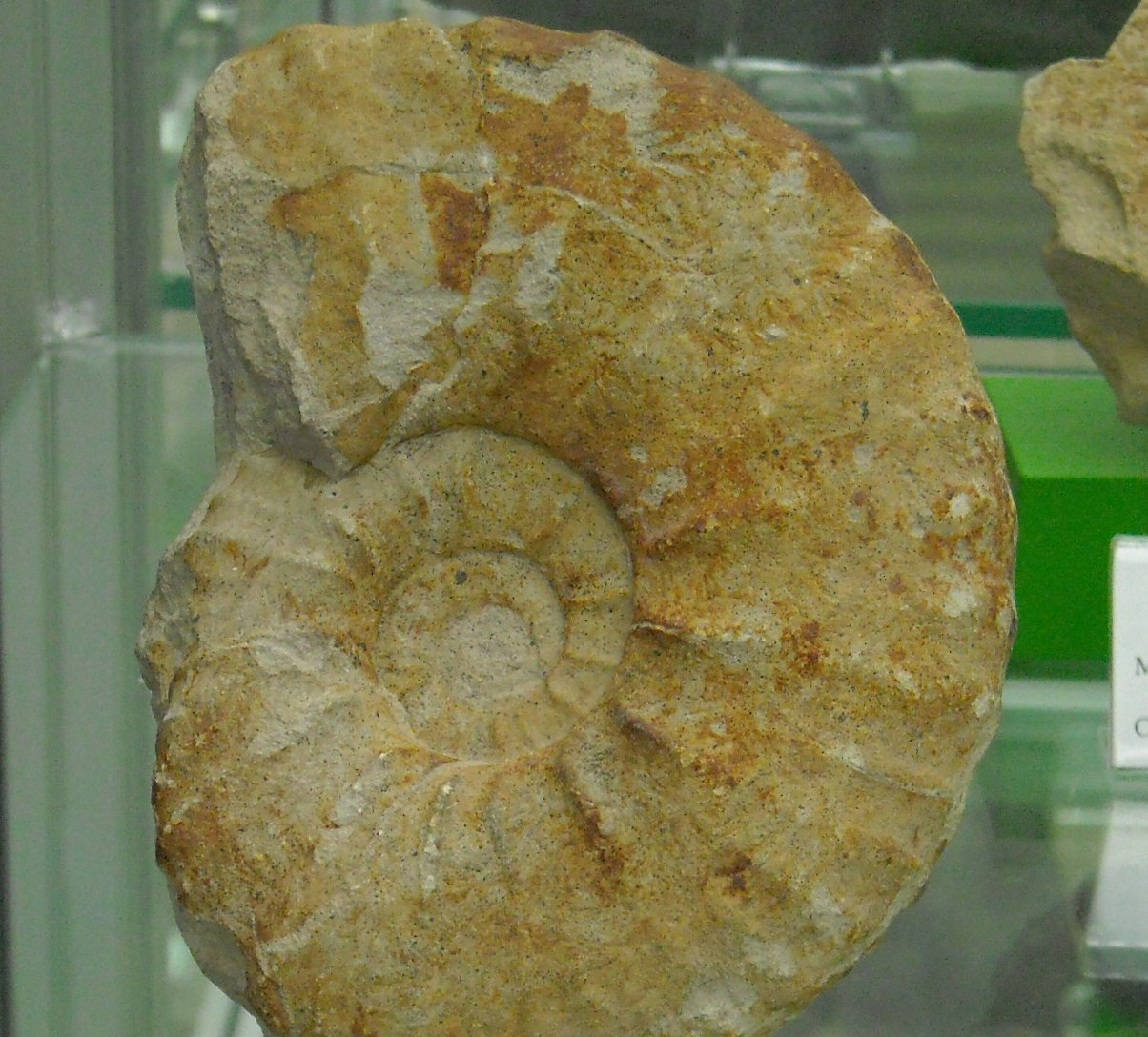
- Fossilized shell of the Late Cretaceous ammonoid cephalopod Pachydiscus
  †Pachydiscus
  - †Pachydiscus ashlandicus – type locality for species
  - †Pachydiscus oregonensis – type locality for species
- †Pachyoncus
  - †Pachyoncus crassus – type locality for species
  - †Pachyoncus floreus – type locality for species
  - †Pachyoncus tumidus
  - †Pachyoncus varius
- †Palaeodasycladus – tentative report
- †Palaeosaturnalis
  - †Palaeosaturnalis subovalis
- †Palaxius
- †Palinandromeda
  - †Palinandromeda fimbria
- †Pamiroseris
  - †Pamiroseris meriani
  - †Pamiroseris smithi
- †Pantanellium
  - †Pantanellium baileyi – type locality for species
  - †Pantanellium butonense – type locality for species
  - †Pantanellium cumshewaense
  - †Pantanellium fosteri
  - †Pantanellium foveatum
  - †Pantanellium inornatum
  - †Pantanellium latum – type locality for species
  - †Pantanellium malheurense – type locality for species
  - †Pantanellium pinguisfloreus – type locality for species
  - †Pantanellium sincerum – type locality for species
  - †Pantanellium ultrasincerum
  - †Pantanellium vigrassi – type locality for species
  - †Pantanellium wui – type locality for species
- †Paradelphinulopsis – type locality for genus
  - †Paradelphinulopsis vallieri – type locality for species
- †Paradeningeria – tentative report
- †Paradiscamphiceras
  - †Paradiscamphiceras athabascanense
  - †Paradiscamphiceras dickinsoni
  - †Paradiscamphiceras elkhornense – type locality for species
- †Parahsuum
  - †Parahsuum formosum – type locality for species
  - †Parahsuum hiconocosta
  - †Parahsuum izeense
  - †Parahsuum mostleri – type locality for species
  - †Parahsuum officerense
  - †Parahsuum publicum
  - †Parahsuum sporta – type locality for species
  - †Parahsuum vizcainoense
- †Parallelodon
  - †Parallelodon monobensis – or unidentified comparable form
- †Parasaturnalis
  - †Parasaturnalis diplocyclis – type locality for species
  - †Parasaturnalis yehae – type locality for species
- †Parasepsagon
  - †Parasepsagon variabilis
- †Parentactinia
  - †Parentactinia nakatsugawaensis
- †Parentactinosphaera – tentative report
  - †Parentactinosphaera longispinosa
- †Paronaella
  - †Paronaella araneae
  - †Paronaella bona – type locality for species
  - †Paronaella curticrassa
  - †Paronaella fera – type locality for species
  - †Paronaella grahamensis
  - †Paronaella kotura
  - †Paronaella obesa
  - †Paronaella pessagnoi
  - †Paronaella pygmaea
  - †Paronaella skowkonaensis
  - †Paronaella snowshoensis – type locality for species
  - †Paronaella venadoensis – or unidentified related form
- †Parvicingula
  - †Parvicingula blackhornensis
  - †Parvicingula blackhorsensis
  - †Parvicingula elegans
  - †Parvicingula matura
  - †Parvicingula media
  - †Parvicingula praeacutum
- †Parvifavus
  - †Parvifavus irregularis
- †Parvivacca
  - †Parvivacca blomei – or unidentified comparable form
- †Perispyridium
  - †Perispyridium apertum – type locality for species
  - †Perispyridium darwini
  - †Perispyridium dettermani – or unidentified comparable form
  - †Perispyridium dumitricai
  - †Perispyridium facetum
  - †Perispyridium gujohachimanense
  - †Perispyridium oregonense – type locality for species
  - †Perispyridium schopfi
  - †Perispyridium tamarackense
  - †Perispyridium whalenae – type locality for species
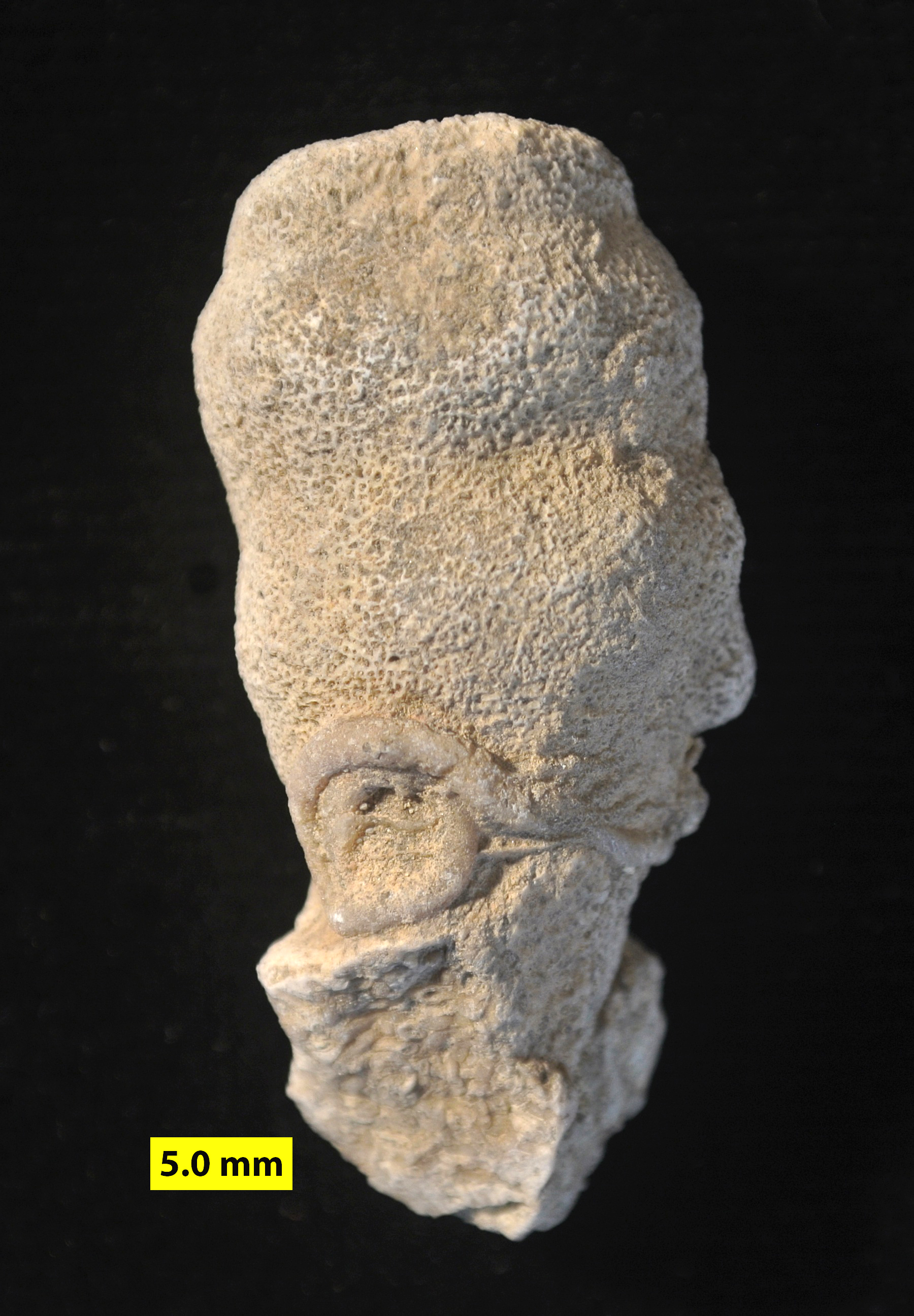
- Fossil of the Devonian-Cretaceous sponge Peronidella
  †Peronidella
- †Phacelostylophyllum
  - †Phacelostylophyllum zitteli
- Pholadomya
- †Phylloceras
  - †Phylloceras umpquanum
- †Phyllopachyceras
  - †Phyllopachyceras trinitense
  - †Phyllopachyceras umpquanum
- †Plafkerium
  - †Plafkerium robustum – type locality for species
- †Plagiostoma – tentative report
- †Planiinvoluta
- †Platymya
  - †Platymya rockymontana
- †Pleesus
  - †Pleesus aptus – type locality for species
- †Pleuromya
- †Pleuronectites
- Plicatula
  - †Plicatula hekiensis
- †Poulpus
  - †Poulpus haeckeli – type locality for species
  - †Poulpus karnicus – type locality for species
  - †Poulpus lupheri – type locality for species
- †Praeconocaryomma
  - †Praeconocaryomma decora – type locality for species
  - †Praeconocaryomma parvimamma
  - †Praeconocaryomma splendida – type locality for species
  - †Praeconocaryomma whiteavesi
  - †Praeconocaryomma yakounensis
- †Praeparvicingula
  - †Praeparvicingula burnsensis
  - †Praeparvicingula communis
  - †Praeparvicingula decora
  - †Praeparvicingula grantensis
  - †Praeparvicingula inornata
  - †Praeparvicingula prisca
  - †Praeparvicingula profunda
  - †Praeparvicingula schoolhousensis
  - †Praeparvicingula sodaensis
  - †Praeparvicingula tlellensis
  - †Praeparvicingula vera
- †Procyclolites
- †Promathildia
- †Pronoella
  - †Pronoella uintahensis
- †Protorcula
  - †Protorcula frydai
- †Protunuma
  - †Protunuma japonicus
- †Pseudocrucella
  - †Pseudocrucella hilara – type locality for species
  - †Pseudocrucella ornata – type locality for species
  - †Pseudocrucella pecta – type locality for species
  - †Pseudocrucella prava
  - †Pseudocrucella tangae – type locality for species
- †Pseudoheliodiscus
- †Pseudolimea
  - †Pseudolimea naumanni
- †Pseudopantanellium
  - †Pseudopantanellium floridum – type locality for species
- †Pseudopoulpus
  - †Pseudopoulpus acutipodium – type locality for species
  - †Pseudopoulpus deweveri – type locality for species
- †Pseudoristola
  - †Pseudoristola faceta – type locality for species
  - †Pseudoristola megaglobosa – type locality for species
- †Pseudosaturniforma
  - †Pseudosaturniforma minuta
- †Pseudospondylospira
  - †Pseudospondylospira perplexa
- †Pseudostylosphaera
  - †Pseudostylosphaera japonica
  - †Pseudostylosphaera magnispinosa – type locality for species
- †Purpuroidea – report made of unidentified related form or using admittedly obsolete nomenclature
- †Pylostephanidium

== Q ==
- †Quadrisaturnalis – type locality for genus
  - †Quadrisaturnalis dickinsoni – type locality for species
  - †Quadrisaturnalis grandis – type locality for species
  - †Quadrisaturnalis quadratus – type locality for species
- †Quarticella
  - †Quarticella ovalis – or unidentified comparable form

== R ==
- †Radium – type locality for genus
  - †Radium pessagnoi – type locality for species
- †Recticostastraea – type locality for genus
  - †Recticostastraea wallowaensis – type locality for species
- †Renzium – type locality for genus
  - †Renzium adversum – type locality for species
  - †Renzium webergorum – type locality for species
- †Retiophyllia
  - †Retiophyllia dawsoni
  - †Retiophyllia norica
  - †Retiophyllia oppeli – or unidentified related form
  - †Retiophyllia parviseptum
- †Ristola
  - †Ristola prisca
  - †Ristola reliqua – type locality for species
  - †Ristola turpicula
- †Rolumbus
  - †Rolumbus beatus – type locality for species
  - †Rolumbus hilarus – type locality for species
  - †Rolumbus lautus – type locality for species

== S ==
- †Saitoum
  - †Saitoum coronarium – or unidentified comparable form
  - †Saitoum dickinsoni – type locality for species
  - †Saitoum smithi – type locality for species
  - †Saitoum thayeri – type locality for species
- †Salzburgia – tentative report
- †Sarasinella
  - †Sarasinella densicostata – or unidentified comparable form
  - †Sarasinella hyatti
  - †Sarasinella subspinosa – or unidentified comparable form
- †Sarla
  - †Sarla delicata – type locality for species
  - †Sarla externa – type locality for species
  - †Sarla formosa – type locality for species
  - †Sarla plena – type locality for species
  - †Sarla triangulata – type locality for species
  - †Sarla vetusta – or unidentified related form
- †Scalarites
  - †Scalarites mihoensis
- †Scaphites
  - †Scaphites condoni
- †Schistophylloceras
  - †Schistophylloceras aulonotum – or unidentified related form
- †Sepsagon
  - †Sepsagon longispinosus
- †Septocardia
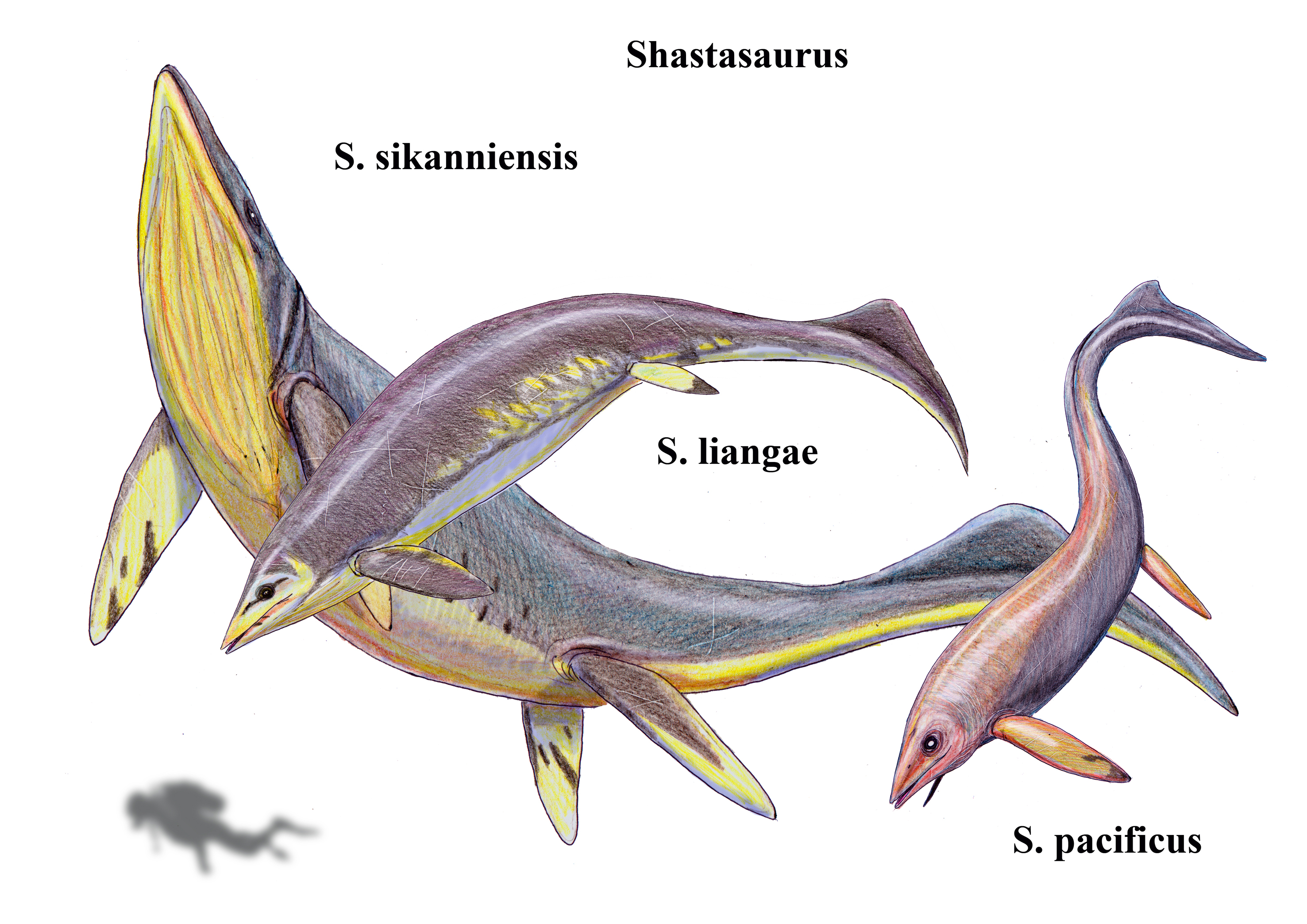
- Life restoration of three species of the Middle-Late Triassic ichthyosaur genus Shastasaurus
  †Shastasaurus
  - †Shastasaurus pacificus – or unidentified comparable form
- †Silicarmiger
- †Simbirskites
  - †Simbirskites elatus – or unidentified related form
  - †Simbirskites progrediens – or unidentified related form
- †Sontonaella
  - †Sontonaella concinna – type locality for species
  - †Sontonaella spongiosa – type locality for species
- †Spinidelphinulopsis – type locality for genus
  - †Spinidelphinulopsis whaleni – type locality for species
- †Spitidiscus
  - †Spitidiscus oregonensis – type locality for species
- †Spondylospira
  - †Spondylospira lewesensis
  - †Spondylospira tricosta
- †Spongiomorpha
  - †Spongiomorpha acyclica
  - †Spongiomorpha gibbosa – or unidentified comparable form
  - †Spongiomorpha tenuis
- †Spongocapsula
  - †Spongocapsula palmerae
- †Spongostylus
  - †Spongostylus carnicus
- †Stauracontium – tentative report
  - †Stauracontium trispinosum
- †Stromatomorpha
- †Stuoresia
  - †Stuoresia libratosepta – or unidentified comparable form
- †Stylophyllopsis
  - †Stylophyllopsis lindstroemi – or unidentified comparable form
  - †Stylophyllopsis rudis – or unidentified comparable form
- †Stylophyllum
- †Subprionocyclus
  - †Subprionocyclus branneri
  - †Subprionocyclus neptuni
  - †Subprionocyclus normalis – type locality for species
- †Sympolycyclus
- †Syringocapsa
  - †Syringocapsa turgida

== T ==
- †Tardentactinia
  - †Tardentactinia oregonensis – type locality for species
- †Teichertus
  - †Teichertus pessagnoi – type locality for species
  - †Teichertus splendidus
- †Telacapsula – type locality for genus
  - †Telacapsula johndayensis – type locality for species
  - †Telacapsula littlescottyensis – type locality for species
  - †Telacapsula odoghertyi – type locality for species
  - †Telacapsula wangi – type locality for species
- †Tetraditryma
  - †Tetraditryma coldspringensis
  - †Tetraditryma corralitosensis
  - †Tetraditryma pseudoplena
- †Tetragonites
  - †Tetragonites glabrus
  - †Tetragonites jacksonense – type locality for species
- †Tetrarchiplagia
  - †Tetrarchiplagia yehae
- †Tetratrabs
  - †Tetratrabs acutusspina – type locality for species
  - †Tetratrabs izeensis – type locality for species
  - †Tetratrabs robustusspina – type locality for species
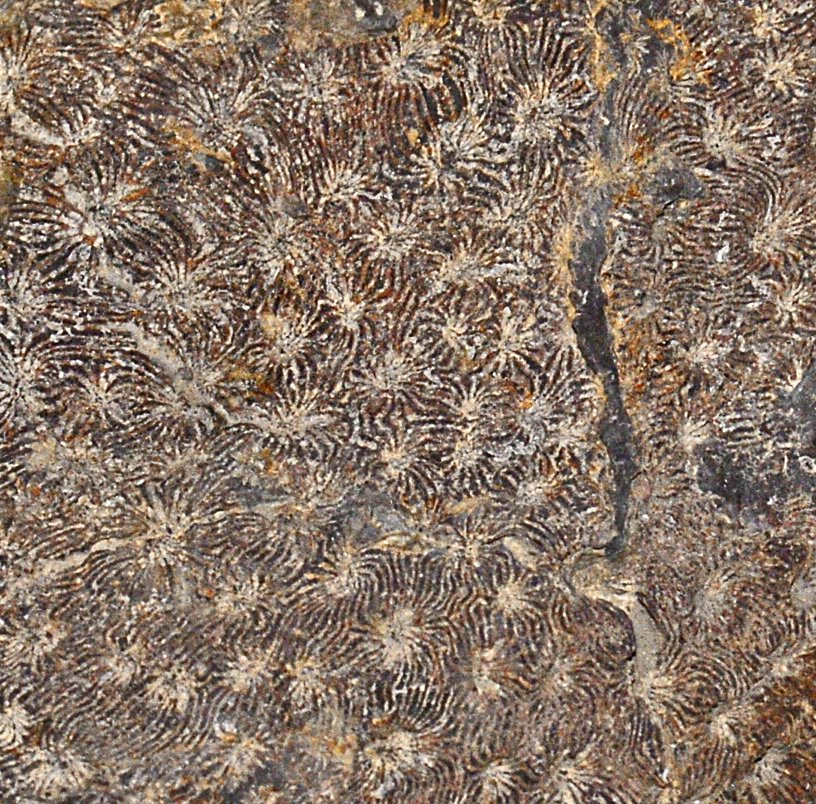
- Fossil of the Triassic-Eocene stony coral Thamnasteria
  †Thamnasteria
  - †Thamnasteria borealis
- †Thamnasteriamorpha
  - †Thamnasteriamorpha frechi
- †Thecomeandra
  - †Thecomeandra vallieri
- †Thecosmilia – report made of unidentified related form or using admittedly obsolete nomenclature
- †Thurmanniceras
  - †Thurmanniceras jenkinsi
  - †Thurmanniceras stippi – or unidentified comparable form
  - †Thurmanniceras wilcoxi
- †Thurstonia
  - †Thurstonia gibsoni – or unidentified comparable form
- †Tolypammina
- †Tosapecten
  - †Tosapecten subhiemalis
- †Tozerium
- †Tragodesmoceras
  - †Tragodesmoceras ashlandicum
- †Triactoma
  - †Triactoma rosespitensis
- †Triassocampe
  - †Triassocampe exilis – type locality for species
  - †Triassocampe illyrica
  - †Triassocampe immaturum
  - †Triassocampe pulchra – or unidentified comparable form
  - †Triassocampe sulovensis
- †Triassocingula
- †Triassocyrtium – tentative report
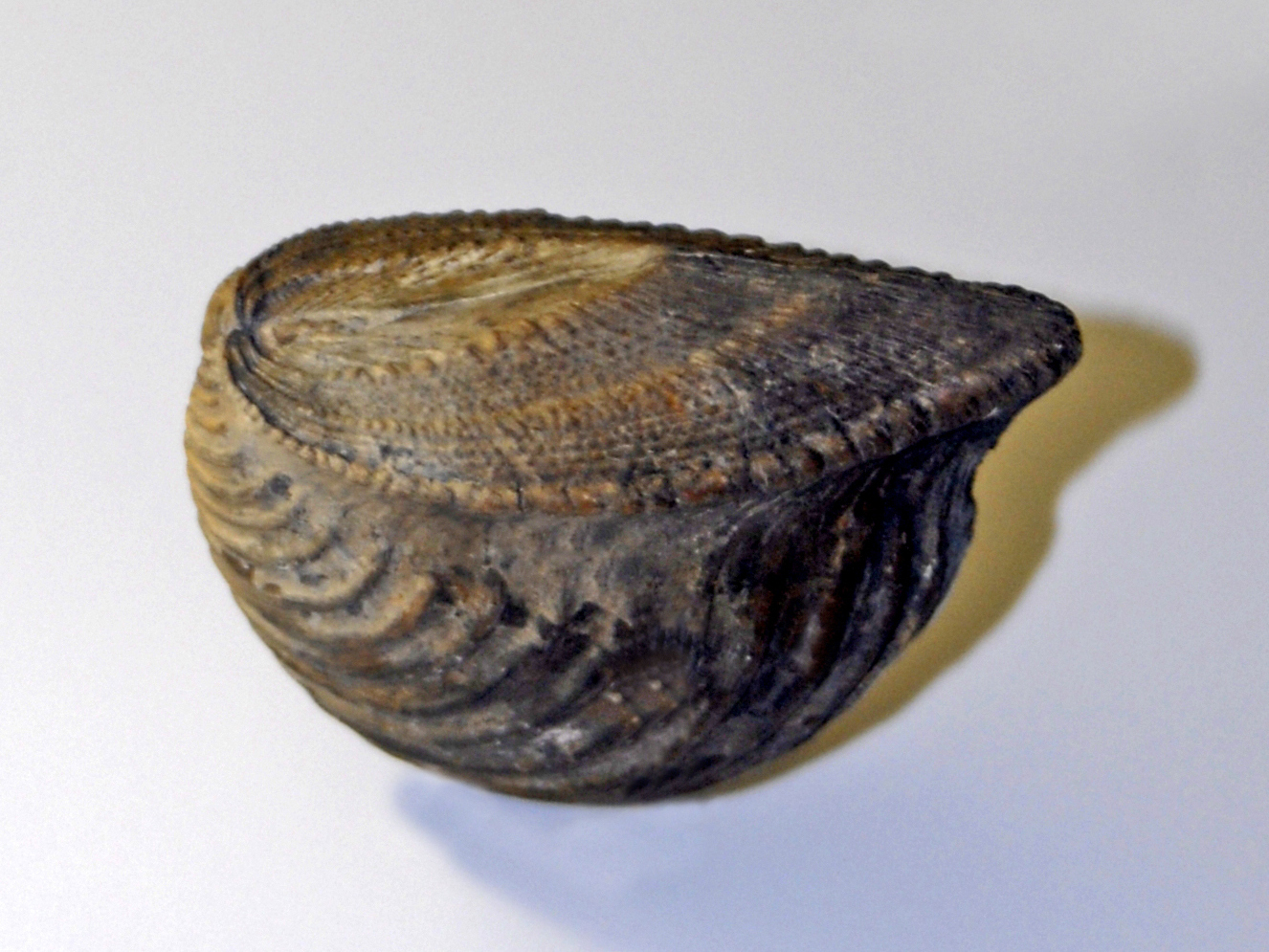
- Fossilized shell of the Permian-Paleocene marine bivalve Trigonia
  †Trigonia
  - †Trigonia montanaensis
- †Trillus
  - †Trillus elkhornensis
  - †Trillus seidersi – type locality for species
- †Tripocyclia
  - †Tripocyclia brooksi
  - †Tripocyclia smithi
  - †Tripocyclia southforkensis
  - †Tripocyclia wickiupensis
- †Tritrabs
  - †Tritrabs simplex
  - †Tritrabs suavis
  - †Tritrabs worzeli – or unidentified comparable form
- †Triversus
  - †Triversus fastigatus
- Trochocyathus
  - †Trochocyathus oregonensis – type locality for species
- †Tropites
- †Turanta
  - †Turanta fida – type locality for species
  - †Turanta morinae
  - †Turanta nodosa
- †Turristylus
  - †Turristylus triadicus – or unidentified related form
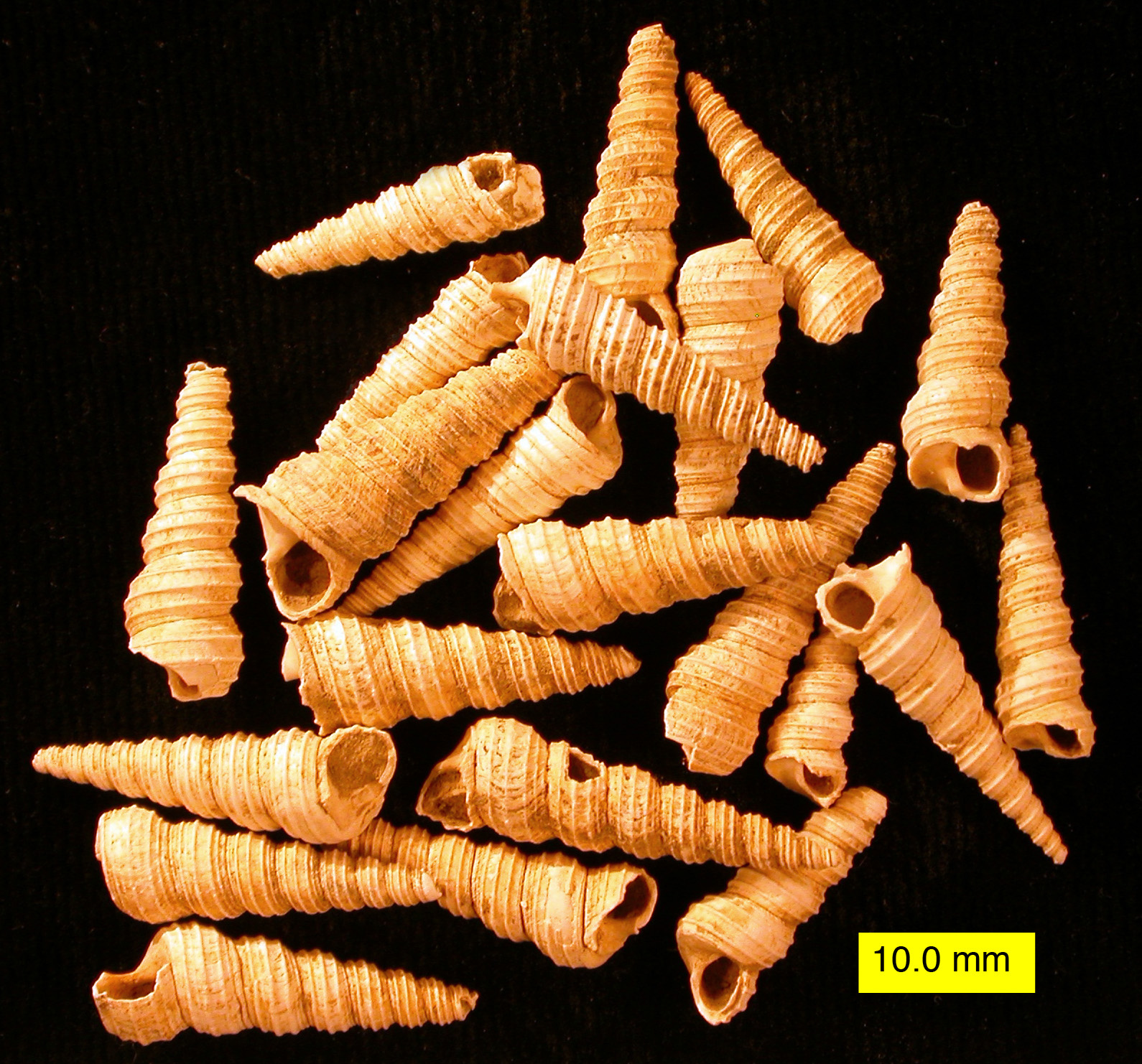
- Fossilized shells of the Late Jurassic-modern tower snail Turritella
  Turritella
  - †Turritella buwaldana
- †Tutcheria
  - †Tutcheria densestriata
  - †Tutcheria densestriatum

== U ==
- †Undularia
- †Unuma – tentative report
  - †Unuma unicus – type locality for species
- †Uvanella
  - †Uvanella norica

== V ==
- †Vaugonia
  - †Vaugonia oregonensis – type locality for species
  - †Vaugonia yukonensis – tentative report
- Venericardia
- †Vermiceras
  - †Vermiceras mineralense
  - †Vermiceras morganense – type locality for species
  - †Vermiceras rursicostatum – or unidentified related form
- †Verticiplagia
  - †Verticiplagia oregonensis – type locality for species
  - †Verticiplagia verticillata
  - †Verticiplagia yehae

== W ==
- †Wallowaconcha
  - †Wallowaconcha raylenea
- †Wallowanerita – type locality for genus
  - †Wallowanerita newtonae – type locality for species
- †Wellsia
  - †Wellsia oregonensis
  - †Wellsia packardi
  - †Wellsia vigorosa
- †Weyla
- †Williriedellum
  - †Williriedellum frequens
- †Wilvemia
- †Wrangellium
  - †Wrangellium izeense – type locality for species
  - †Wrangellium oregonense – type locality for species
  - †Wrangellium thurstonense – or unidentified comparable form

== X ==
- †Xiphostylus
  - †Xiphostylus communis – type locality for species
  - †Xiphostylus fragilis
  - †Xiphostylus halli
  - †Xiphostylus logdellensis
  - †Xiphostylus simplus – type locality for species
  - †Xiphostylus sinuosus
  - †Xiphostylus superbus
  - †Xiphostylus vallieri
  - †Xiphostylus whalenae
- †Xiphotheca
- †Xiphothecaella
  - †Xiphothecaella longa

== Y ==
- †Yamatoum
- †Yeharaia
  - †Yeharaia elegans

== Z ==
- †Zardinia – tentative report
- †Zartus
  - †Zartus dickinsoni – type locality for species
  - †Zartus imlayi – type locality for species
  - †Zartus jonesi – type locality for species
  - †Zartus jurassicus – type locality for species
  - †Zartus praejonesi – type locality for species
  - †Zartus thayeri – type locality for species
- †Zoneait – type locality for genus
  - †Zoneait nargorum – type locality for species
- †Zugmayerella
  - †Zugmayerella americana – type locality for species
  - †Zugmayerella uncinata
