= Homerites =

Homerites Temporal range: U Triassic (Carnian)

Scientific classification
- Domain: Eukaryota
- Kingdom: Animalia
- Phylum: Mollusca
- Class: Cephalopoda
- Subclass: †Ammonoidea
- Order: †Ceratitida
- Family: †Tropitidae
- Genus: †Homerites; Mojsisovics 1893

Genus of molluscs (fossil)

Homerites is a genus of small, involute, globase fossil ceratitids with an eccentric outer whorl and subammonitic sutures belonging to the family Halortidae The body chamber has a slight central keel and radial dichotomous ribs that commonly terminate at spines on the ventral shoulder. Homerites, described and named by Mojsisovics in 1893 has been found in the Upper Triassic (Carnian) of California and the Alps. The Halortidae in which it is placed is part of the superfamily Tropitaceae.
