= Tropitidae =

Tropitidae Temporal range: U Triassic

Scientific classification
- Domain: Eukaryota
- Kingdom: Animalia
- Phylum: Mollusca
- Class: Cephalopoda
- Subclass: †Ammonoidea
- Order: †Ceratitida
- Superfamily: †Tropitoidea
- Family: †Tropitidae; Mojsisovics, 1875

The Tropitidae is a family of Upper Triassic Ammonoidea belonging to the Tropitoidea, a superfamily of the Ceratitida

Tropitidae have subspherical to discoidal, involute to evolute shells with long body chambers and a ventral keel bordered by furrows. The surface may have ribs, nodes, or spines, or may be smooth. The suture is generally ammonitic, but may be ceratitic to goniatitic.

The derivation of the Tropitidae is uncertain but they seem to form a group along with the Tropiceltitidae and Haloritidae within the superfamily.

== Genera ==
Tropididae genera included:

- Acanthotropites
- Anatropites
- Arctotropites
- Arietoceltites
- Discotropites
- Euisculites
- Gymnotropites
- Homerites
- Homeroceras
- Hoplotropites
- Indonesites
- Jovites
- Margaritropites
- Microtropites
- Paratropites
- Paulotropites
- Platotropites
- Pleurotropites
- Sibyllites
- Tritropidoceras
- Tropites
