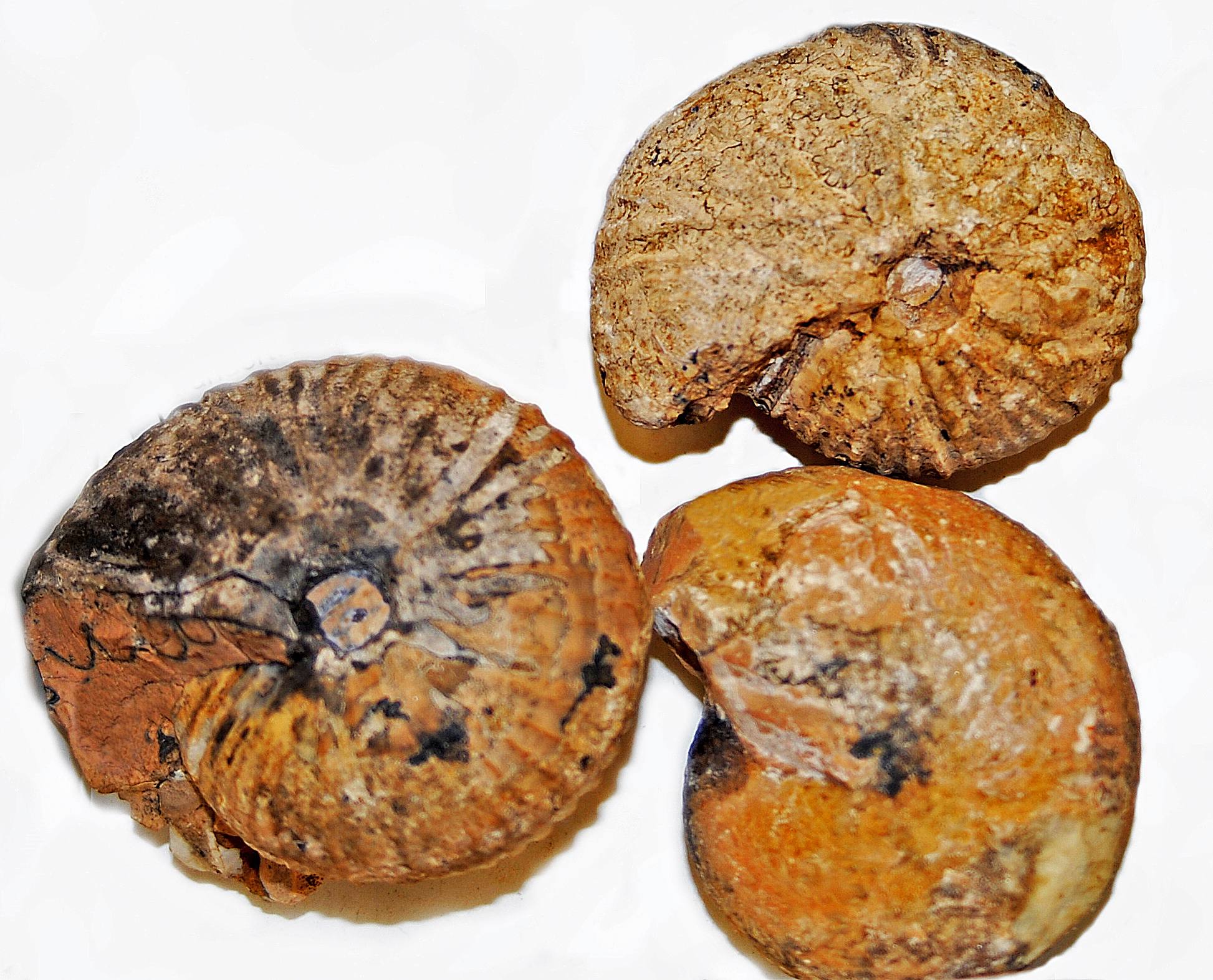
- Fossil shells of Catenohalorites malayicus from Triassic of Timor

Scientific classification
- Kingdom: Animalia
- Phylum: Mollusca
- Class: Cephalopoda
- Subclass: †Ammonoidea
- Order: †Ceratitida
- Family: †Haloritidae
- Genus: †Catenohalorites; Tatzreiter 1980

= Catenohalorites =

Catenohalorites Temporal range: Triassic 212–205.6 Ma

Genus of molluscs (fossil)

Catenohalorites is an extinct genus of Triassic ammonoids belonging to the family Haloritidae.

== Species ==
- Catenohalorites alexandri Mojsisovics 1893 †
- Catenohalorites catenatus von Buch 1833 †
- Catenohalorites malayicus Welter 1914 †

== Fossil record ==
This genus is known in the fossil record of the Triassic (from about 212 to 205.6 million years ago). Fossils of species within this genus have been found in Indonesia, Oman and Tajikistan.

== Bibliography ==
- Treatise on Invertebrate Paleontology, Part L, Ammonoidea. R. C. Moore (ed). Geological Society of America and Univ of Kansas press, 1957

== See also ==
- List of ammonite genera
