= Arnioceltites =

Arnioceltites Temporal range: Late Triassic

Scientific classification
- Kingdom: Animalia
- Phylum: Mollusca
- Class: Cephalopoda
- Subclass: †Ammonoidea
- Order: †Ceratitida
- Family: †Tropiceltitidae
- Genus: †Arnioceltites; Mojsisovics, 1893

Genus of molluscs (fossil)

Arnioceltites is a genus of Late Triassic ammonites that has been found in the Alps, Sicily, and possibly in California. The shell is evolute and ribbed, with the outer whorls becoming smooth. Arnioceltities is included in the Tropiceltitidae family of the ceeratitid superfamily Tropitoidea.
