= Amarassites =

Scientific classification
- Kingdom: Animalia
- Phylum: Mollusca
- Class: Cephalopoda
- Subclass: †Ammonoidea
- Order: †Ceratitida
- Family: †Haloritidae
- Genus: †Amarassites; Welter in Wanner, 1914

Genus of molluscs (fossil)

Amarassites is an extinct genus of cephalopods belonging to the ammonite subclass.
