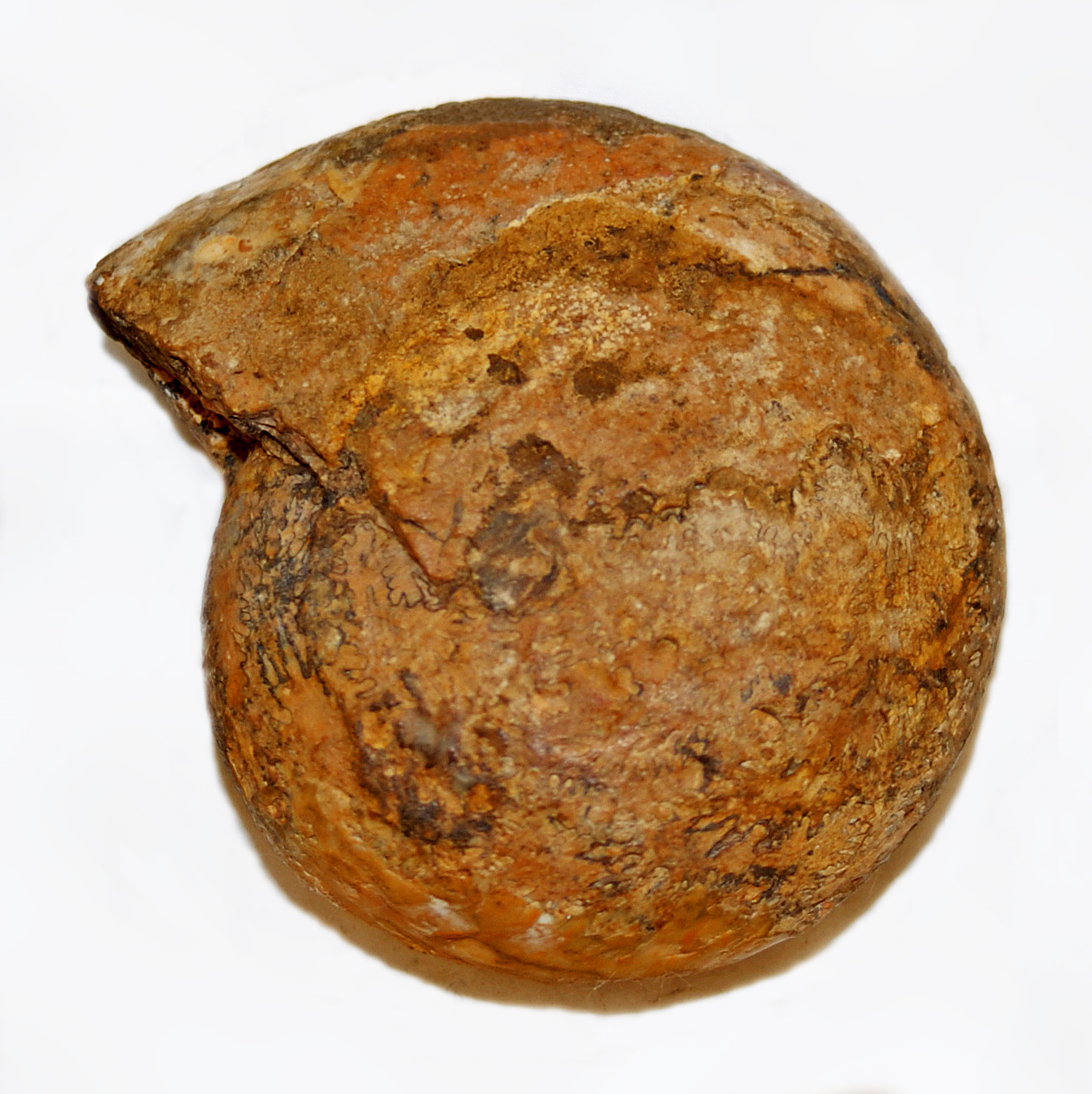
- Fossil shell of Halorites phaonis from Upper Triassic (Norian) of Indonesia (Noe Bihati, Timor)

Scientific classification
- Domain: Eukaryota
- Kingdom: Animalia
- Phylum: Mollusca
- Class: Cephalopoda
- Subclass: †Ammonoidea
- Order: †Ceratitida
- Family: †Haloritidae
- Genus: †Halorites; Mojsisovics, 1879

= Halorites =

Halorites Temporal range: Upper Triassic 212–205.6 Ma

Genus of molluscs (fossil)

Halorites is an extinct genus of Triassic ammonoids belonging to the family Haloritidae.

== Fossil record ==
This genus is known in the fossil record of the Triassic (from about 212 to 205.6 million years ago). Fossils of species within this genus have been found in Indonesia, Canada, India, Oman, Tajikistan and United States.

== Bibliography ==
- Treatise on Invertebrate Paleontology, Part L, Ammonoidea. R. C. Moore (ed). Geological Society of America and Univ of Kansas press, 1957
- Arkell et al., 1957. Mesozoic Ammonoidea, Systematic Descriptions. Treatise on Invertebrate Paleontology Part L, Ammonoidea. Geol Soc of Amer. and Univ Kans. Press. L199

== See also ==
- List of ammonite genera
