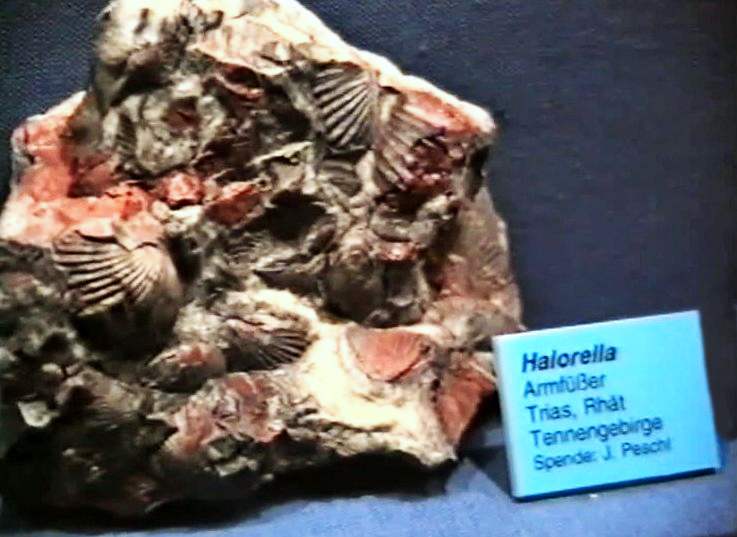
- Fossils of Halorella

Scientific classification
- Kingdom: Animalia
- Phylum: Brachiopoda
- Class: Rhynchonellata
- Order: Rhynchonellida
- Superfamily: Dimerelloidea
- Family: †Halorellidae; Ager, 1965

= Halorellidae =

Halorellidae Temporal range: Triassic

Extinct family of marine lamp shells

Halorellidae is an extinct family of brachiopods belonging to the order Rhynchonellida.

== Fossil record ==
These lamp shells lived in the Triassic (age range: 221.5 to 201.6 Ma). Fossils of this family can be found in Austria, Canada, China, Hungary, Indonesia, New Zealand, Russia, Slovakia, Tajikistan, Turkey and United States.
