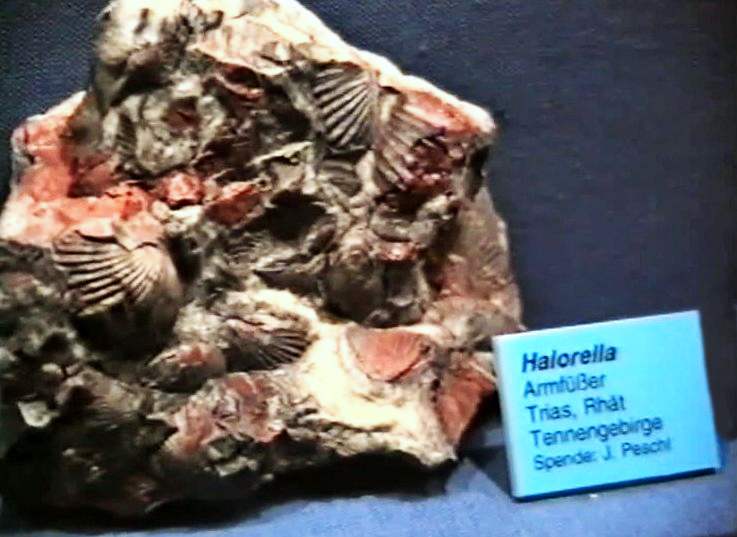
- Fossils of Halorella from Germanic Trias, Rhaetian, Tennen Mountains

Scientific classification
- Kingdom: Animalia
- Phylum: Brachiopoda
- Class: Rhynchonellata
- Order: Rhynchonellida
- Family: †Halorellidae
- Genus: †Halorella; Bittner, 1884

Synonyms
- Barzellinia Gregorio; Barzellinia Sepkoski, Jr.; Barzellinia Williams et al.

= Halorella =

Halorella Temporal range: Carnian - Rhaetian

Extinct genus of marine lamp shells

Halorella is an extinct genus of brachiopods belonging to the family Halorellidae.

== Fossil record ==
These lamp shells lived in the Triassic (from Carnian to Rhaetian age). Fossils of species within this genus can be found in Austria, Canada, China, Hungary, Indonesia, New Zealand, Russia, Slovakia, Tajikistan, Turkey and United States.

== Species ==
Species within this genus include:

- Halorella amphitoma Bronn 1832
- Halorella flabella Xu 1978
- Halorella geniculata Xu 1978
- Halorella jianchuanensis Jin and Fang 1977
