= Arietoceltites =

Scientific classification
- Domain: Eukaryota
- Kingdom: Animalia
- Phylum: Mollusca
- Class: Cephalopoda
- Subclass: †Ammonoidea
- Order: †Ceratitida
- Family: †Tropitidae
- Genus: †Arietoceltites; Diener, 1916

Genus of molluscs (fossil)

Arietoceltites is an extinct genus of cephalopod belonging to the ammonite subclass.
