= Ristola =

Surname list

Ristola is a surname. Notable people with the surname include:

- Aleksi Ristola (born 1989), Finnish footballer
- Pekka Ristola (born 1929), Finnish Nordic combined skier

== See also ==
- Ristolas, former French commune
