= Anatropites =

Anatropites Temporal range: U Triassic

Scientific classification
- Domain: Eukaryota
- Kingdom: Animalia
- Phylum: Mollusca
- Class: Cephalopoda
- Subclass: †Ammonoidea
- Order: †Ceratitida
- Family: †Tropitidae
- Genus: †Anatropites; Mojsisovics, 1893.

Genus of molluscs (fossil)

Anatropites is a genus of ammonite in the ceratitid family Tropitidae with spines instead of nodes on the umbilical shoulder, at least in early whorls. Ceratitids are mostly Triassic ammonoid cephalopods.

Anatropites comes from British Columbia in Canada, Oregon and California in the United States, and Indonesia. The shell is in general evolute, but deeply impressed along the inner, or dorsal, margin. The whorl section is broad with flanks converging on a gently arched venter that bears a median keel.
