= Tropitoidea =

Scientific classification
- Kingdom: Animalia
- Phylum: Mollusca
- Class: Cephalopoda
- Subclass: †Ammonoidea
- Order: †Ceratitida
- Superfamily: †Tropitoidea; Mojsisovics, 1875

Synonyms
- Tropitaceae

Extinct superfamily of ammonite cephalopods

Tropitoidea, formerly Tropitaceae, is an extinct superfamily of ammonite cephalopods in the order Ceratitida, containing the following families:

- Didymitidae
- Episculitidae
- Haloritidae
- Juvavitidae
- Parathisbitidae
- Thisbitidae
- Tropiceltidae
- Tropiceltitidae
- Tropitidae
