= Haloritidae =

Haloritidae Temporal range: Upper Triassic

Scientific classification
- Kingdom: Animalia
- Phylum: Mollusca
- Class: Cephalopoda
- Subclass: †Ammonoidea
- Order: †Ceratitida
- Superfamily: †Tropitoidea
- Family: †Haloritidae; Mojsisovics, 1893

Subfamilies
- Haloritinae; Juvavitinae

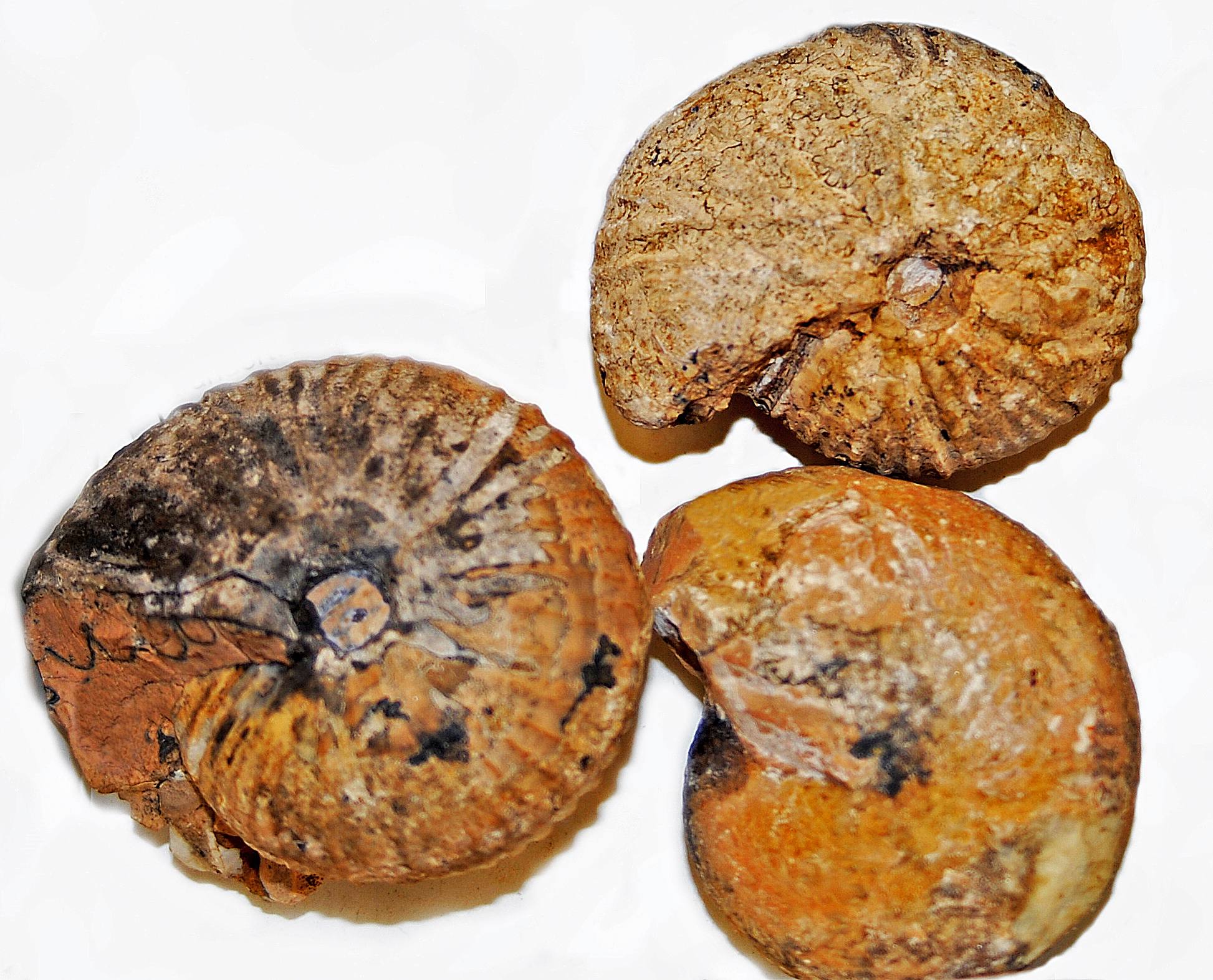
Fossil shells of Catenohalorites malayicus from Triassic of Timor.

The Haloritidae is a family of subglobular, involute, Triassic ammonoids belonging to the ceratitid superfamily Tropitoidea. Their shells may be smooth or may have ribs that cross or are interrupted on the venter, and may have nodes. Keels and ventral furrows are not typical. The last volution is commonly eccentric. The Suture may be ammonitic, ceratitic, or goniatitic.

In the present classification of the Haloritidae, the family is divided into two subfamilies, the Haloritinae and the Juvavitinae. In the older classification of the Treatise (1957) the Haloriitidae was divided into three subfamilies, the Haloritinae, with spiral ornamentation weak or absent, the Sagenitinae with prominent spiral ornamentation and a more subdivided suture reassigned to the Pinacocerataceae as the Sagenitidae, and the Episculitinae with a simplified suture and uncoiling of the body chamber

The present Haloritinae includes Halorites, the type, Amarassites, Gnomohalorites, Paraguembelites, and Parajuvavites. The Juvatinae includes Juvavites, type, Dimorphites, and Gonionotites, included in the original Haloritinae. The Episcultinae of the original Haloritidae has become the Episculitidae, still in the Tropitoidea.
