= Geology of the Iberian Peninsula =

Geology of peninsula in southwestern Europe

Major components of the geology of the Iberian Peninsula

Geological map of the Iberian Peninsula

The geology of the Iberian Peninsula consists of the study of the rock formations on the Iberian Peninsula, connected to the rest of the European landmass by the Pyrenees. The peninsula contains rocks from every geological period from the Ediacaran to the Quaternary, and many types of rock are represented. World-class mineral deposits are also found there.

The core of the Iberian Peninsula consists of a Hercynian cratonic block known as the Iberian Massif. On the northeast, this is bounded by the Pyrenean fold belt, and on the southeast, it is bounded by the Betic fold mountain chain. These two mountain chains are part of the Alpine belt. To the west, the peninsula is delimited by the continental boundary formed by the opening of the Atlantic Ocean. The Hercynian fold belt is mostly buried by Mesozoic and Cenozoic cover rocks to the east but nevertheless outcrops through the Iberian Chain and the Catalan Coastal Ranges.

== Iberian Massif ==
The Iberian Massif consists of rocks from the Paleozoic Era. It was assembled about 310 Ma. Several zones occur in the Iberian Massif. These were the pieces that were assembled to form the block. On the north coast of Spain occurs the Cantabrian zone. Then to the west and also in the Iberian Chain and Catalan Coastal Ranges is the West Asturian-Leonese zone. Then the Central Iberian zone appears near A Coruña, through the north of Portugal, and through the middle of Spain, including the Montes de Toledo. The Ossa-Morena zone outcrops out to the east of Lisbon. This includes some Precambrian rocks. The furthest south part is the South-Portuguese zone.

The Variscan Orogeny occurred as the European Hunic Terrane (split off from Gondwana) and Laurentia-Baltica continents collided. In Iberia this occurred in the pre-Stephanian Carboniferous (354–305 Ma). The external part of the orogeny was the Cantabrian zone. This was deformed in the upper crustal layers. The West Asturian Leonese zone and Central Iberian zone are the external parts of the orogeny and are more deeply deformed and metamorphosed, and intruded. These three zones are part of one terrane. The Ossa-Morena zone and South Portuguese zone are two different terranes that have become attached. In the Mesozoic this was mostly covered with other sediments, which have since eroded.

=== Cantabrian zone ===
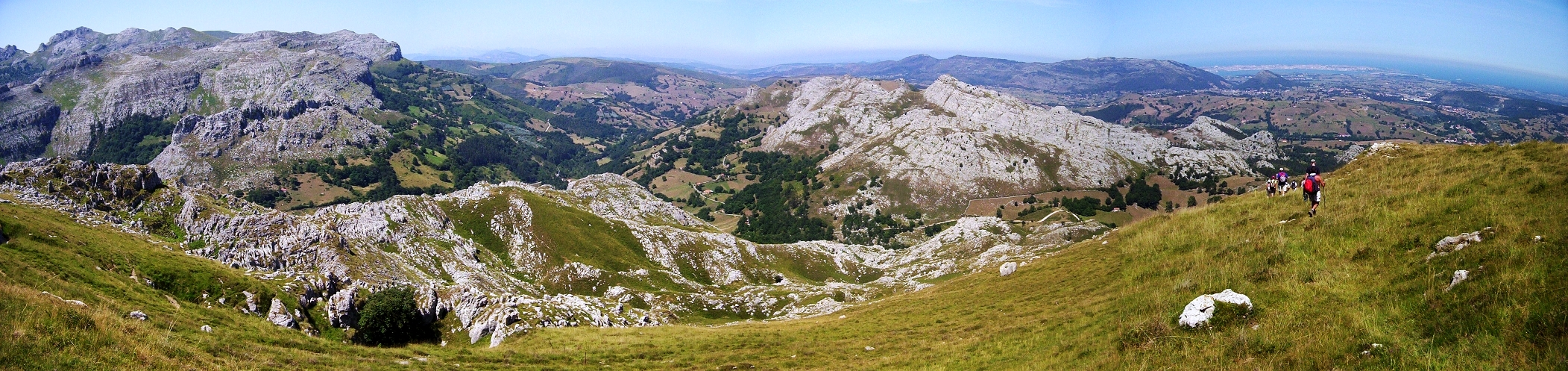
The Cantabrian Mountains. The peak Alto de Brenas in Riotuerto has a height of 579 metres (1,900 ft).

The Cantabrian zone consists of Carboniferous and older Paleozoic unmetamorphosed rocks.

It is bounded on the west and south-west sides by a concave arc of Precambrian rocks called the Narcea window, and the Villabandin window in the Narcea antiform.

The Herreria Formation from the Lower Cambrian consists of shale and feldspathic sandstone alternating, with some conglomerate. These have a thickness of 1 to 1.5 km.

The Lancara Formation consists of a couple of hundred metres of limestone and dolostone. The lower part was formed in peritidal zones in the Lower Cambrian, and the upper member from the Middle Cambrian contains fossils and is red or green glauconictic and nodular limestone.

The Oville Formation from Middle to Upper Cambrian contains alternating shale and sandstone. Trilobite fossils are common in the shale.

The Barrios Formation is Arenigian and up to 500 metres (1,600 ft) thick. It consists of a white massive quartzite.

The Penas and Vidrias area, close to the western boundary of the Cantabrian zone has a complete succession of Ordovician deposits. Black shales from Llanvirnian times are found in the Central Coal Basin eastern side. But mostly in the Ordovician Period, this zone was above water and eroding.

The Formigoso Formation dates from Middle Llandovery time in the Silurian. It consists of Monograptus black shales and is up to 150 m thick.

The San Pedro and Furada Formations are up to 300 metres thick and consists of shale and iron bearing sandstone interbedded, These are from Wenlock Ludlow and Lower Gedinian times.

In the Devonian Period deposition occurred on the western side, with dolomite, argillaceous limestone, marl and shale from the Raneces Complex or La Vid Formation. It is 600 metres (2,000 ft) thick and Gedinian to Emsian in age.

The Santa Lucia Formation is of limestone. It contains coral near the Narcea Antiform in the west and has peritidal facies in the east near the Central Coal Basin. The Huergas Formation alternates between red sandstone and shale and is of Couvinian to Givetian age. The Portilla formation is of coralline limestone of Givetian to Frasnian age. This is topped off by sandstone layers up to 500 m thick from the Frasnian to Fammenian age. Devonian sediments are not found to the east of the central coal basin, and are thickest in the west.

A pelagic facies comes from the Pisuerga-Carrion province.

In Carboniferous times deposition started with black shales and cherts from the Tournaisian age, and then red limestone, red shale and radiolarites were formed in the Visean age. Mountain Limestone is a thick black lifeless limestone of Serpukhovian age. Turbidites with olistoliths also appear in the Serpukhovian, indicating the first sign of the Hercynian (Variscan) tectonic events. These first events happened in the Pisuerga-Carrion province.

Variscan compression lifted the west side, turning a sedimentary basin into a mountain range. Over time the compressed zone moved towards the east. In the Namurian A stage, the Olleros formation was built from turbidites in a trough in front of the orgen, and the Barcallente formation was a carbonate platform further off shore. In the Namurian B stage the trough was forming San Emillano Formation, and the Valdeteja Formation was offshore, but in deeper marine conditions. During Westphalian A time the trough was filled and deposits of terrestrial material formed the San Emiliano Formation and Sama Group and the Lena group being thickest in the Central Coal Basin Unit. Further east in the Picos de Europa it remained covered in shallow water with continuous formation of a carbonate platform.

The Westphalian age is represented by 5000 m of the Central Coal Basin, which as the name suggests contains coal. To the east this grades into the marine carbonates of the Picos de Europa. In the Pisuerga-Carrion province, there are conglomerates composed of quartzite, turbidites with slump deposits from deeper sea water. There are also some limestone layers with fossils.

The source of the Westphalian sediments was from the west and south. These were the mountains of the Hercynian chain, formed at the same time as these deposits. During the Westphalian the rocks in the Cantabrian zone were folded and overthrust. The Paleozoic rocks broke off at the level of the Lancara Formation and were thrust over the top the upper layers forming nappes and thrust sheets. The Ponga Nappe Province is to the east of the Central Coal Basin,

Stephanian age molasse deposits overlie the other Carboniferous rocks and are unrelated to the Hercynian (Variscan) orogeny. Some final folding occurred at right angles to the Westphalian structures.

Further uplift occurred, and in the Stephanian period there were some land locked basins in the mountains over the west and south nappes. But the Picos de Europa Unit was still a marine area.

In the Permian and into the Mesozoic there was extension tectonics. The Permian Autunian succession – Viñon Formation formed when basins were created by downwards normal faulting. It is mostly limestone with layers of conglomerate, shale, gypsum and alkaline volcanics. The Villaviciosa Formation from the Saxonian formed on an arid continent with sandstone and conglomerate. Conditions in the Triassic were very arid, and lagoons evaporated depositing gypsum and marl. During the Jurassic and Cretaceous Periods the zone was underwater, but most deposits from these time have been eroded away.

Another way to look at the zone is by its structure: It consists of several thrust units: Somiedo-Correcilla, Sobia-Bodón, Aramo, (the first to move in Early Westphalian) Central Coal Basin, Ponga (second to move) and Picos de Europa (last to move in Early Stephanian) and Pisuerga-Carrión Unit (or Palantine) (which went nowhere).

In the Late Stephanian the zone was bent around a vertical axis to make the current crescent shape. This kind of bending is called an orocline.

Two theories explain the Permian basin formation due to crustal extension, lithosphere delamination as solid mantle sinks from the bottom of the lithosphere, being replaced by hot asthenosphere; or a continental rift.

=== West Asturian Leonese zone ===
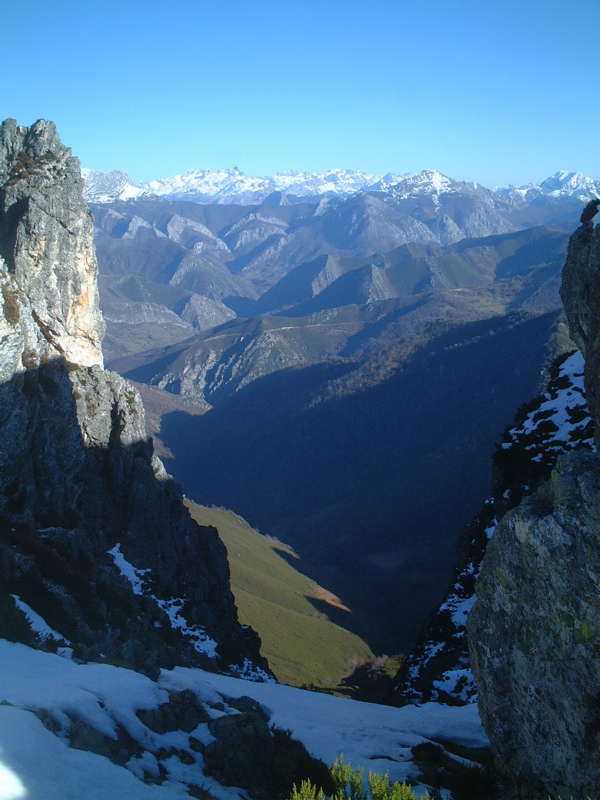
Picos de Europa mountain range.

The West Asturian Leonese zone lies to the west and south-west of the Precambrian rocks of the Narcea antiform, and extend east to the Precambrian rocks of the Ollo de Sapo antiform. Rocks in this zone are mostly from Cambrian and Ordovician, with few from Silurian to Carboniferous. The Cambrian and Ordovician rocks were formed in shallow water in a subsiding trough. Later deposits were formed in deeper water. They have been metamorphosed to greenschist or low grade amphibolite. Also they mostly have a slaty cleavage. Folds face the centre of the arc. In the west the folds are recumbent and large: Mondoñedo and Courel folds. In the east the folds are asymmetrical. The base of the Mondoñedo fold is an overthrust with the same name. Another overthrust forms the edge of this zone where it meets the Narcean Antiform. Crenulation cleavage occurs near these overthrusts. All these structures formed between Lower Devonian and Stephanian B-C.

From the Cambrian Period, the Candana Quartzite is equivalent to the Herreria Formation and is 1 to 2 km thick. The Vegadeo Limestone is equivalent to the Lancara Formation and is 0.1 to 0.2 km thick. The Cabos Series is equivalent to the Oville and Barrios Formations and is 4 km thick.

Black shales, called the Luarca Slates are Llanvirnian to Llandeilian age (middle to upper Ordovician) and are 0.5 to 1 km thick. The Agüeira Formation consists of turbidites of Caradocian age and is 3 km thick. Following a disconformity the Silurian black slates are laid down 0.4 km thick.

There are few outcrops of lower Devonian rocks in the San Clodio area. And in the Carboniferous Period, this was an erosional zone forming the source of material for the Cantabrian Carboniferous deposits.

=== Central Iberian zone ===
The Central Iberian zone covers the middle part of the west side of the peninsula, including north and central Portugal. The top north west corner has been replaced with the Galicia-Tras-Os-Montes zone. The constituent rocks are metamorphosed sediments.

The oldest rocks are Proterozoic, metamorphosed sediments. They have been deformed by the Cadomian Orogeny. There are volcanics and further sediments from the end of the Ediacaran and Cambrian periods.

Before the Carboniferous this was deformed in a north east direction with thrusts and folds.

The oldest rocks are from the Cambrian, possibly the Precambrian, and are orthogneiss and paragneiss. These are found near Foz do Douro, and Miranda do Douro. Above this are schists or shales with beds of turbidites or limestone interleaved. The stratigraphic sequence can be observed south west of Salamanca in the Tamames Syncline, and in the Montes de Toledo. These are followed by an unconformity. Above the unconformity can be found reddish sandstone, shale and conglomerate of Tremadocian age up to 1 km thick. An Arenigian age quartzite formation is equivalent to the Amorican Quartzite. Then there is black shale or slate matching the Luarca Slate of Llanvirn to Llandeilo Age. On top of this is the Botella or Cantera Quartzite, 0.1 km thick of Llandeilian to Caradocian Age.

Above this is a lenticular limestone called Urbana Limestone and shale and sandstone of Caradocian to Asghilian Age. Then comes the Criadero Quartzite in the Almaden area at the base of the Silurian Period. Black graptolytic shale and basic volcanic rocks overlay this.

Granite appeared with the Variscan Orogeny.

Devonian age terrigenous deposits up to 2 km thick occur in the south of the zone. There is a large amount of volcanic rock in the Almaden Syncline.

The lower Carboniferous has a flysch facies along the southern boundary of the zone, and also in the San Vitero area and around the Morais and Bragança Massifs.

=== Galicia-Trás-os-Montes zone ===
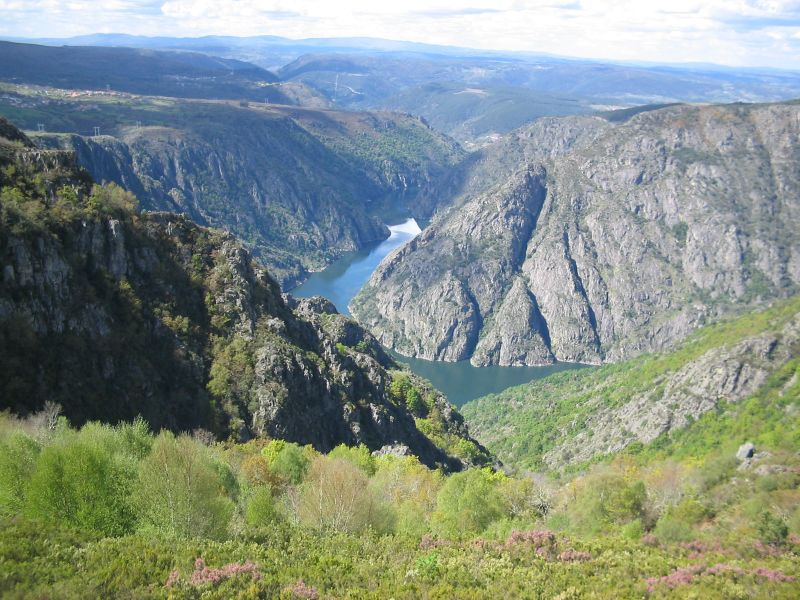
The Galician Massif mountains surrounding the Sil River in Lugo, Galicia.

The Galicia-Trás-os-Montes zone is a bean-shaped tectonic unit in the northwest corner of Spain and northeast Portugal (Trás-os-Montes). It has also been called the allochthonous complexes. The zone consists of a nappe stack which is highly metamorphosed. It was formed by the collision of the Iberian plate with a thinned piece of crust from another continent called the Meguma terrane. There are five units in the stack. At the lowest level are high pressure, low temperature metamorphosed rocks. Second is an ophiolite. Third is the lower part of a continental crust which has been metamorphosed to high temperature with high pressure. Fourth is a layer of sediments derived from weathering land with low-grade metamorphism. There is also an underlying Ediacaran and early Paleozoic layer called the autochthenous sequence. Metamorphism of the allochthenous nappe occurred 390–380 Ma in the Middle Devonian. This is possibly from the Rheic Ocean. Finally, above this are other schists called the schistose domain of Galicia-Trás-os-Montes or Para-autochthenon. There are five oval shaped masses of mafic to ultramafic rocks making up the ophiolite. These are the Cabo Ortegal, Ordes, Lalín, Bragança and Morais Massifs. Each of these are in a syncline and are surrounded by Silurian metamorphic rocks with an inward-dipping thrust zone forming the boundary. The kinds of rock in the mafic massifs are schists, gneiss, amphibolite, metagabbro, granulite, eclogite, and serpentine. The Ordes Massif dates from 380 to 390 Ma, and represents part of the Rheno-Hercynian Ocean as part of an accretionary wedge. It became joined to the European Hunic Terrane between the Channel Block and the allochthenous nappe. It has a corresponding block, the Lizard complex in southwest England. The Cabo Ortegal complex is dated around 345–340 Ma and is the remains of a Paleo-Tethys Ocean mid-oceanic ridge

The Malpica-Lamego line is a shear zone forming a line running north–south on the west side of the Galicia-Trás-os-Montes zone. It is 275 km long and associated with intrusions of granodiorite. There is over 10 km of vertical offset along the shear zone.

=== Ossa Morena zone ===
The Ossa Morena zone (OMZ) forms a band in the southern part of Portugal and the south west corner of Spain. The oldest rocks are Precambrian forming bands in two elongated anticlines between Córdoba and Abrantes. The Cambrian rocks start with conglomerate, and then have shallow water deposits and limestone. The Ordovician Period is represented by pelitic facies. In the Late Ordovician syenite and alkaline granite intrusions rose along the Córdoba Abrantes belt The Silurian Period has volcanic rocks both acid and basic, and also pelitic deposits. The Lower Devonian was formed in shallow water. The Upper Devonian follows a break and is of flysch.

In the Carboniferous it starts with a turbidite sequence containing basic volcanics. This is about 200 metres thick. Above this are coal bearing layers. Mountain building occurred at this point. In the Westphalian age this was deposited in lakes lying between mountain ranges. In the Stephanian age molasse occurs, also in basins between mountains.

The Ossa-Morena zone was transform faulted with the Central Iberian zone. As it slid past (200 km horizontally to the south-east and 10 km vertically), it formed the Peñarroya Basin during the late Langsettian and early Duckmantian part of Carboniferous. The basin is about 50 km long and 1 wide.

The Tomar-Badajoz-Córdoba Shear zone (TBCZ) consists of rock that has been sheared in a ductile fashion in the left lateral direction. It is 350 km long and from 2 to 15 km wide. Granite from the Cambrian and Ordovician has turned into orthogneiss. Migmatites and metamorphosed sediments constitute the bulk of the zone. But there are also lens shaped bodies consisting of eclogite and garnet amphibolite. The shearing occurred from the end of the Devonian to Carboniferous. The zone is a suture between different terranes (CIZ and OMZ) making up the Iberian Massif.

The boundary or suture between the Ossa Morena zone and the South Portuguese zone is formed by an ophiolite: the Beja-Acebuches Ophiolite Complex (BAOC). This is made up of high-pressure metamorphic rocks, eclogite and blueschist. These have been thrust in the southwest direction over the top of the rock from the South Portuguese zone.

=== South Portuguese zone ===
The South Portuguese zone (SPZ) is an exotic terrane coming from a different continent to the more northern parts of the Iberian plate. Prior to 380 Ma the SPZ was part of the Laurasia and attached next to what later became the Grand Banks. This continent was actually to the north of Iberia, which in turn was part of the European Hunic Terrane (EHT). At 380 Ma SPZ impacted the EHT between allochthonous units of the Galicia-Tras-Os-Montes zone and Meseta. At about 320 Ma, the SPZ again headed south sliding past the west side of the Ossa Morena zone.

The South Portuguese zone now forms a thin triangle on the south end of Portugal. Only rocks from the Upper Devonian to Carboniferous are found in the south Portuguese zone. The Late Devonian is represented by phyllite and quartzite beds with graded bedding. Volcanic rocks from Tournaisian and Lower Visean contain manganese, zinc and pyrite ores. This is known as the Iberian Pyrite Belt. This is the remains of seafloor hydrothermal vents. The majority of the zone is covered by Late Visean turbidite sequences several kilometres thick.

Mines in the pyrite belt area include Neves-Corvo mine in Portugal, Rio Tinto which has been mined for 2000 years, Aguas Teñidas, Las Cruces mine, Los Frailes.

The Via Basin existed on the northeast edge in Permian times.

=== Intrusions ===
During the Hercynian cycle, some plutons were formed in the peninsula. Gabbro appeared in northwest Galicia as Monte Castelo Gabbro, and also at Beja in Portugal. Two different kinds of granite occur. One comes from the middle crust and is high in felspar and low in Calcium, and the other kind comes from the lower crust mixed with mantle magmas, and is a calcalkaline granite.

The first kind of granite is subdivided into granodiorite and muscovite-biotite leucogranite (two mica granites). The granodiorite can be found at Finisterre, western Salamanca, Zamora, Gredos, Aracena. The two mica leucogranites can be found at Friol, Porto-Viseu, Moncorvo-Vila Real, Vigo, Finisterre, Gil Ibarguchi, La Guardia and also near Salamanca. Most of the granites are 318 Ma to 319 Ma. But some are from 340 Ma.

The calcalkaline granites were intruded at two times. The older one consists of granodiorite and adamellite with inclusions of tonalite, diorite, and gabbro. In western Galicia they are 316 Ma.

The younger calcalkaline granites mostly have coarse crystals, they are biotite and hornblende granodiorites. These have intruded later than the two mica granites and are frequent in northern and central Portugal. The radiometric age is around 300 Ma. Some of the batholiths of this mixed type of granite are in Cabeza de Araya, Forgoselo, Ponferrada and Boal, and La Runa.

== Mesozoic ==
The Iberian Peninsula was joined to Armorica (Northern France) before the Late Mesozoic. In the early Cretaceous, the Bay of Biscay started opening around 126 Ma and completed by 85 Ma. This created the Biscay Abyssal Plain, and parted the peninsula from the Trevelyan Escarpment. During this time Iberia rotated anticlockwise relative to Eurasia. This caused the subduction of the Ligurian Basin onto the eastern side. This formed the Betic nappe stack. After 85 Ma the Atlantic Ocean opening started between Ireland and Greenland. This left the Bay of Biscay as a failed rift. The new Atlantic spreading caused Eurasia to rotate clockwise back towards Iberia causing underthrusting and subduction on the east side of the northern edge of Iberia, forming the Pyrenees.

In Late Triassic and Early Jurassic there were two stages of rifting involving extension and subsistence on the western margin of Iberia. It also extended the western margin. The Iberian Abyssal Plain, off the west coast of Portugal and Spain, formed 126 Ma. This separated Newfoundland's Grand Banks, with Galica Bank and Flemish Cap being split at 118 Ma. By Early Cretaceous, 110 Ma rifting occurs on west and north west edges.

In the Mesozoic, Late Jurassic Africa started moving east, and the Alpine Tethys opened. Subsistence related to this caused deep deposits of sediments on the east and some sediment remnants in pop downs in central parts of Spain. Two stages of rifting occurred in the east, one from Later Permian to Triassic, and the second from Late Jurassic to early Cretaceous.

On the south side deposits of carbonates and clastic sediments formed a shelf in shallow water during late Triassic and Liassic times. This was rifted in Toarcian times (Early Jurassic 190 Ma). Active rifting was complete by 160 Ma. After this thermal subsidence occurred till the end of Cretaceous. During this time rifting separated North America from Africa forming a transform zone.

=== Iberian Basin ===
Current sediment outcrops from the Iberian peninsula Mesozoic basins. It has also been featured the Messejana-Plasencia dyke, whose activity was mainly Jurassic.

The Iberian Basin is in the east of Spain. A rift system formed in the Variscan basement from Permian to Late Cretaceous. At the end of the Cretaceous the basin was stretched by 35 km. In Early Neogene times the basin was inverted as a result of the Pyrenean Orogeny, part of the Alpine Chain formation. This inversion resulted in the formation of mountains called the Iberian Range. Rifting occurred at several different times in the Mesozoic repeating the same pattern of sedimentation.

Minas de Henarejos basin filled from in the Early Permian. It was a small continental basin with internal drainage.

Firstly from Late Permian to Late Triassic the Aragonese Branch sediments were deposited. These started with early layers of quartz rich sandstone derived from sedimentary and metasedimentary rocks. This first layer was 0.1 km thick. Later the deposits were derived from plutonic rocks and were feldspar rich and cemented by clay. These early deposits were alluvial and lacustrine. Finally the basin was below sea level and shallow marine carbonates were deposited followed by coastal evaporites. The thickness of these were determined by tectonic depression of the basin floor, and varies from 1 to 6 km. The names of the formations are Saxonian (Araviana Unit from the Permian), Buntsandstein (Tierga Unit, Calcena Unit, Trasobares Unit), Muschelkalk (shallow coastal marine calcareous conditions) and Keuper (evaporites). The Saxonian facies consists of sandstone over quartz conglomerate, and paleosoils. The sandstone almost entirely consists of rounded quartz grains. Rock fragments in this are shales and cherts. The grains are very compacted and cemented by quartz. The Buntsandstein contains sandstone with large crystals from plutonic rocks as well as shale and chert fragments. They are cemented by quartz, feldspar and some carbonate matrix. The presence of Potassium felspar indicates arid conditions were prevalent at the time. During the Olenekian the average temperature was in the low 30s, and the rainfall was less than 180 mm per year.

Also part of the Iberian Basin is the Castilian Branch. Formation in this are from the Permian: Boniches, Alcotas, an unconformity followed by Hoz de Gallo Conglomerate, this is capped by sandstone and silcrete at another unconformity marking the end of the Permian. Then in the Triassic was deposited the Chequilla Conglomerate, Rillo de Gallo Formation, Cañizar Sandstone Fm, Prados Fm, Eslida Fm, Marines Fm, Landete Fm, El Mas Fm, Canete Fm,

Secondly the Cameros Basin was formed and filled from Late Jurassic, Tithonian to Berriasian and Valanginian to early Albian. These are in cycles with alluvial fragments at the bottom and lake limestones and marl towards the top of each cycle. The source of the clastics was the Iberian Massif to the south west of the basin. Formations from this basin include Tera, Oncala, Urbion, Enciso, Olivan and Escucha. The sandstone in the Tithonian is mostly rounded quartz grains, but also 14% of carbonate rock fragments. Next the Berrieasian time deposits are sandstone with mostly quartz, but some albite. The quartz has 35% of polycrystalline grains. It is cemented by clay minerals. This was mainly derived from low grade metamorphic rocks of the Variscan basement. The sandstone from Valanginian is formed from windblown quartz grains. The source of the material was probably Jurassic sedimentary rocks (carbonates and shales). From Hauterivian to Albion ages the sandstones are more mixed with more feldspar. Kaolinite is frequently found filling the space between grains.

The Mesozoic basins were folded and thrust, to form the Iberian Ranges. 30 km of shortening occurred. The ranges trend north west – south east. In the northwest the ranges are buried under the Douro Basin. Sierra de Altomira is a north–south-oriented range separated from the Iberian Ranges by Tagus Basin. This was formed from a thrust sheet that split through evaporite beds from the Triassic.

=== Atlantic opening ===
The Atlantic continental margin off Portugal and Spain is unique. In the zone between continental crust and oceanic crust there is a 100 km wide zone of exhumed continental mantle. During the rift splitting Newfoundland from Iberia there was very little vulcanism and the rift was starved of magma. This resulted in faults uplifting mantle from under the continent to the sea floor. Hyperextended rifting is the name for this phenomenon. The mantle rock is peridotite. The peridotite had been formed from a melt, that was depleted in crustal materials, but then was re-enriched in plagioclase felspar. The mantle exhumation occurred in two phases. First from Valanginian to Hauterivian (142–130 Ma) expansion happened at around 7 mm per year. Secondly from Hauterivian to Albian (130–113 Ma) the mantle was exhumed at around 13 mm per year. After this, the asthenosphere penetrated to the surface, a mid-oceanic ridge formed and normal oceanic crust was formed. The shallower 2–3 km of peridotite has been converted to green serpentine by alteration by seawater at depth. The very surface skin (40 m thick) of the serpentine was then altered to yellow serpentine by low temperature seawater treatment.

==== Gorringe Bank ====
The Gorringe Bank is part of the ridge along the Azores-Gibraltar fault zone. It is about 60 km wide and 180 km long in the northeast direction. Two high seamounts exist: the Gettysburg Seamount has a depth of 25 m, and the Ormonde Seamount is 65 m below the surface. The plate boundaries here are converging at 4 mm/y, as well as sliding past each other. Upper mantle and oceanic crust are exposed along this bank. Ferrogabbro dated at 77 Ma has been intruded. Also at 66 Ma the Canary hotspot mantle plume passed by and caused alkaline magma to intrude. Where there is crust, it is very thin, so that the Moho comes up to the sea floor. Sediment overlies the mantle, so this could be considered as crust. Since the Miocene there has been shortening of the ocean crust absorbed by folding, and thrusting.

==== Tagus Abyssal Plain ====
North of the Gorringe Bank is the Tagus Abyssal Plain. To the east is the continental shelf of Portugal, and to the west is the Madeira-Tore Rise. On the south an olistostrome, the remains of a landslip from the Gorringe Bank, resulting in chaotic sediments. In most of the Tagus Plain the crust is 8 km thick, however in the north it is only 2 km thick. Northwest is the Estremadura Spur.

==== Horseshoe Abyssal Plain ====
South of the Gorringe Bank is the Horseshoe Abyssal Plain. This plain extends south to the Ampere and Coral Patch Seamounts, the Madeira-Tore Rise in the west and the continental slope in the east. The crust below this plain is 15 km thick. Crustal shortening has been accommodated in the plain by reverse faults every few kilometers.

==== Gulf of Cadiz ====
Where the Guadalquivir basin extends to the west off the shore, it forms the Gulf of Cadiz. In the mid Miocene there was mountain building, then from Miocene to Pliocene there was stretching, and finally in Pleistocene the sea floor was compressed again. The gulf has mud volcanoes on the sea floor: Darwin Mud Volcano, Mercator mud volcano and Challenger Mud Volcano.

==== Lusitanian Basin ====
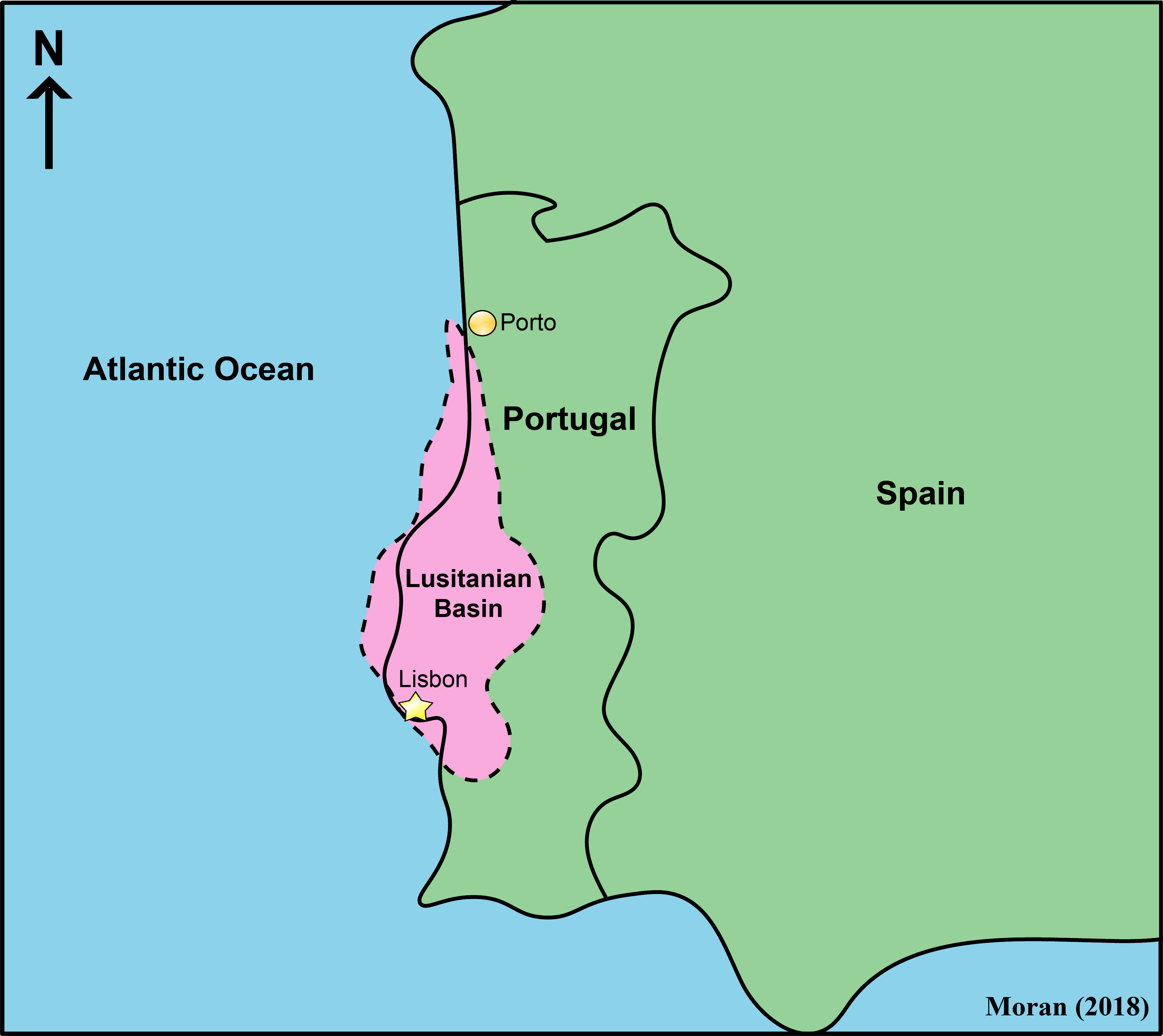
Map of the Lusitanian Basin

The Lusitanian Basin stretches along the mid Portuguese coast with part on land and part off shore. In Sinemurian–Callovian thick layers of carbonates were deposited 196 to 162 million years ago. Off the northern coast of Portugal is the Porto Basin, also elongated in the north–south direction. Further offshore from this, and also off shore from the west coast of Spain is the Galicia Interior Basin. These basins were formed by rifting in the Late Triassic (220 to 195 million years ago). Further out to sea off the west coast of Spain is the Galicia Bank, which consists of continental crust, and was formerly attached to the Flemish Cap. The Galicia Bank has limestone and marl deposited in shallow water from the Tithonian age. This is capped by dolomite from the Berriasian age (143 million years ago).

From Tithonian–Berriasian (150 to 140 million years ago) the rift had shallow platforms with carbonates deposited, and sand in the depths. From Valanginian–Hauterivian (140 to 130 million years ago) carbonate cemented sediments were formed. From Valanginian–Hauterivian (130 to 94 million years ago) oxygen was poor, and there were six periods with no oxygen (anoxic events). From Turonian–Paleocene (94 to 66 million years ago) oxygen was again available and sediments were reddish or multicoloured. Some areas had strong currents. In the Paleocene (66 to 59 million years ago) dark black shales mark the lack of oxygen in stagnant water. From Thanetian to Oligocene (59 to 34 million years ago) and through to the present day, calcareous and siliceous sediments are laid down. A strong deep water circulation started about 34 million years ago and continues till now.

The oceanic anoxic events have been called Bonarelli event (OAE2 at 93.5 million years ago) (caused by volcanic eruptions in the Caribbean), the Mid-Cenomanian Event at 96 million years ago and OAE 1b, OAE 1c, and OAE 1d in the Albian (around 100 to 112 million years ago). The carbon in the black shales appears to come from land as well as the oceans, and nitrogen fixation was also high during these periods.

The Lusitanian Basin is very rich in fossils, mostly marine invertebrates and vertebrates, including dinosaur bones and tracks.

=== Movement ===
From 170 to 120 Ma more than 200 km of left lateral slip occurred between Europe and Iberia as it was rifted from the Grand Banks. From 120 to 83 Ma 115 km of convergence in Sardinia and Corsica region. At 83 Ma convergence with Europe happened till 67.7 Ma when it stopped moving with respect to Europe. In the Eocene 55–46 Ma there was right lateral slip. Then convergence again till the Eocene till early Oligocene.

=== Spanish Central System ===
Central System geological section.

The Spanish Central System is a mountain range separating the Tagus and Douro basins. Sierra de Gredos and Sierra de Guadarrama comprise the named ranges. The land was compressed and elevated as a result of the Alpine Orogeny.

== Pyrenees ==
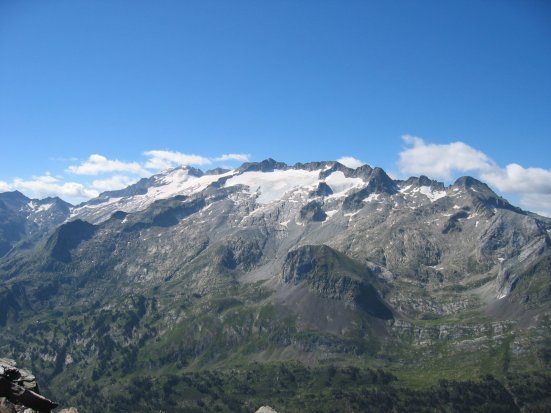
Pico del Aneto, the highest mountain of the Pyrenees

The Pyrenees were formed as the Iberian plate impacted the European plate, it was partly subducted. Initial compression started in Santonian times with the thinned crust subducted. Crust to the west was subducted later. Thrusts were formed to the south resulted in inversion of the Mesozoic basins. The Central Pyrenees had the greatest shortening, with smaller amounts to the west. Shortening continued for 40 Ma. There are several Permian sedimentary basins, up to 1 km deep. These start with grey siltstone, coal and volcanics, and are topped with red siltstone, sandstone and conglomerate. At the end of Cretaceous there was about 150 km separation between Iberia and France.

Gavarine Thrust Sheet:

- Jaca Basin: (near Jaca) — Eocene
- Ainsa Basin: north of Ainsa — Eocene (Sobrarbe Formation corresponding to a delta facies, Escanilla formation a transition from deltaic to alluvial facies and Collegats Formation being composed of alluvial fan deposits.
- Tremp-Graus Basin: from Tremp to Graus — Eocene
- Ager Basin — Lower Cenozoic

== Betics ==
Tectonic map of major structures in the Iberian Peninsula

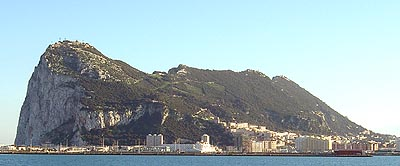
The Rock of Gibraltar is a monolithic limestone promontory created during the Jurassic period some 200 million years ago and uplifted during the Betic Orogeny.

The Betic Cordillera is a mountain range in southern and southeastern Spain, oriented in an ENE direction. It stretches from the Gulf of Cádiz to the Cabo de la Nao.

The Betic Cordillera was formed as a result of a complex interaction of the African plate with Iberia. It consists of four parts, the internal Betics along the coast, the external Betics inland, the flysch units in the far south of Spain (and Gibraltar), and the foreland basin: the Guadalquivir River Basin. Formation happened with 250 km of north–south convergence from mid-Oligocene to late Miocene. From 50 km West North West convergence.

The Betics are part of the Gibraltar Arc, which also includes the Rif in Morocco.

During Triassic and Jurassic times the Betic and Maghrebian margins were opposite each other.

The Internal Betics or Alboran Crustal Domain are found along the coast. They are metamorphosed basement rocks from prior to the Miocene. Three thrusts make up these mountains (first Nevado–Filábride was buried 50 to 70 km deep, then Alpujárride, and lastly Maláguide). The crust was substantially thickened and the lower thrust was high pressure metamorphosed. Within the Internal Betics there are many depressions that have created basins that have filled with sediments. They are called the Betic Neogene Basins, and some are forming even now.

The Maláguide thrust sheet contains rocks from Silurian to Oligocene. Although the Silurian rocks were deformed in the Variscan Orogeny, the rocks in this sheet have only low grade metamorphism. It can be found north and east of Málaga and in a strip along the border between the internal and external Betics. The rocks in the Maláguide thrust sheet include phyllite, metagreywacke, limestone, metaconglomerate. The Devonian and Early Carboniferous is represented by gray slates and conglomerate, with smaller amounts of limestone, chert, and radiolarite. There are some Permian to Triassic red beds, starting with conglomerate and thinning to sandstone and lutite.

The Alpujárride Thrust Sheet spreads from western Málaga province to Cartagena in the east. This layer has been more metamorphosed than the Maláguide thrust sheet. It was buried from 35 to 50 km deep. At its base is mica schist, with some gneiss and migmatite formed from sediments older than the Permian. Above this is a bluish grey schist from the Permian, and the next layer is carbonate from the Middle to Late Triassic. Above this is a black mica schist, and the top layers are a brown coloured metapelite and a quartzite.

The Triassic Mesozoic to Miocene deposits form the External Betics. Subbetic zone with deeper water deposits is in the southeast and the Prebetic zone to the northwest contains shallow water deposits. The Campo de Gibraltar Unit is a prism accreted from terrigenous deposits formed in the Oligocene.

The Fortuna Basin makes up the Eastern Betics. It is from Tortonian to Pliocene (younger than 11.6 Ma). The basin floor subsided rapidly at first. It started filling with marine sediments as it was connected with the Mediterranean Sea. Later it became isolated and evaporites started to appear. These were then covered with continental sediments by late Tortonian 7.2 Ma. The basin became isolated as the edges were tectonically raised. During the Messinian to lower Pliocene 7.2–3.6 Ma the basin floor was lowered another 1 km and continental sediments filled it. During the Pliocene the basin was compressed, sheared and uplifted.

Ronda Peridotites outcrop in the western Internal Betics in the Alpujárride thrust sheet. These have been partly serpentinized. The variety of peridotite is lherzolite. These were intruded at a pressure of 1 gigapascal (GPa). Beneath the Ronda Peridotites is an eclogite formed at a pressure of 1.5 GPa. Two massifs, Sierra Bermeja and Sierra Alpujata have been rotated by 40° to the west since their solidification, as has the western External Betics.

The Nevado–Filábride Thrust Sheet was buried 50 to 70 km deep. It contains rocks originally from the Paleozoic to the Cretaceous. It has undergone high pressure low temperature metamorphism. It consists of three units. The Ragua Unit consists of albite and graphite containing mica schist, and quartzite. The Calar Alto Unit has chloritoid and graphite containing mica schist, from the Paleozoic, light coloured Permo-Triassic schist, and marble from the Triassic, which have been metamorphosed to upper greenschist level at up to 450 °C. The Bédar-Macael Unit was metamorphosed to the amphibolite level, and contains marble, serpentinite, and tourmaline gneiss, as well as the more common schist. This unit was heated to 550 °C.

At the west end of the Betics lies the Guadalquivir Basin. It unconformably overlies the South Portugal zone, Ossa Morena zone and Central Iberian zone. It contains Neogene to Quaternary aged material.

The Betics were compressed about 300 km in the Cenozoic.

In Late Miocene a sill (land bridge) formed in the Gibraltar arc, disconnecting the Mediterranean from the Atlantic Ocean several times. This caused the evaporation of the Mediterranean Sea.

The Rock of Gibraltar is a monolithic limestone promontory. The rock was created during the Jurassic period some 200 million years ago and uplifted during the Betic Orogeny.

=== Alboran Sea ===
The Alboran Basin south of Spain and Gibraltar formed in the early Miocene by extending and thinning continental crust to only 12 or 15 km thick. It is still filling with sediment to this day beneath the Alboran Sea. So far 8 km of sediments have accumulated. The Alboran sea has numerous areas on its floor formed from volcanic flows. This includes the Alboran Island halfway across the sea. During the Pliocene and Pleistocene volcanism continued.

=== Trans Alboran Shear zone ===
The Trans Alboran Shear zone is a 35° (north east) trending fault zone extending from Alicante in Spain, along the coast of Murcia through the Betic range, across the Alboran Sea to the Tidiquin Mountains in Morocco. This zone shows itself with earthquakes. The south east side is moving north east, and the north west side is moving south west.

== Balearic Islands ==
The Balearic Islands are on a raised platform called the Balearic Promontory.

Majorca:

- Port d'es Canonge Formation — Permian period, Guadalupian epoch
- Asa Formation — Permian period, Lopingian epoch
- Son Serralta Formation— Triassic period, Anisian stage

Minorca:

- Saxonian Facies = Asa Formation — Permian period, Lopingian epoch: 260–251 Ma
- Conglomerate — Triassic period, Olenekian stage, Smithian substage: 249 Ma
- Buntsandstein — Triassic period, Olenekian and Anisian stages: 248–237 Ma
- Muschelkalk — Triassic period, Ladinian stage: 237–238 Ma

The southern margin consists of a narrow shelf where carbonates are deposited. Sediments spill over the ledge. South of Cabrera Island between Formentera and Cabrera islands is a small volcanic province with a few dozen outlets. The slope to the south of the shelf is the Emile-Baudot escarpment. It only has one canyon, the Menorca Canyon, with Menorca Fan at its base. The crust in the Balearic Promontory is 25 km thick. The lithosphere is only 30 km and there is a low seismic velocity asthenosphere below.

In Menorca there are extensive outcrops of the Variscan basement. In the Triassic deposits similar to those in Germany were formed. In the early Jurassic it was covered with shallow sea water and limestone formed. From Middle to Late in the Jurassic marl and limestone formed in deep water. In the Cretaceous marl and shallow water limestone was formed. From the Late Cretaceous to the Paleogene there were few deposits. From the Eocene there is some shallow water limestone in the southeast. During the Eocene to early Oligocene, the island of Sardinia was located northeast of the Balearic Promontory (Menorca). Sardinia and Corsica rotated away from 19 to 15 Ma. From the Oligocene there is some conglomerate.

Orogeny (mountain building) started again during the Neogene. As the ground was deformed conglomerate, calcareous sandstone, limestone, and calcareous turbidites appeared. During the orogeny from Late Oligocene to Middle Miocene the ground was shortened (compressed) by 50%. On the southeast of Majorca overturned folds were produced in the Late Oligocene to Langhian. In the Middle and Late Miocene (mostly Serravallian) the ground was stretched (extended) and faults formed and created basins. In the Late Miocene they filled with water and sediment. After the orogeny, limestone marl and calcareous sandstone were added. Later in the Pliocene till now contraction has taken place again.

From the Early Miocene there are two volcanoes of calc-alkaline volcanics.

South of the Balearics there is the Algerian Basin floored by oceanic style crust from 4 to 6 km and a moho less than 15 km deep. The floor of this basin is 0.5 km of Pliocene to Quaternary sediments overlying the Messinian evaporites 1.2 km thick, which from diapirs into the sediments.

== Cenozoic ==
Compression conditions were experienced spreading to the west along the northern margin of Iberia. This caused narrowing of the Bay of Biscay, with subduction of the bay floor happening forming the Cantabrian Mountains, starting at the very end of Cretaceous and into early Eocene. The subduction ceased at 54 Ma.

Stress from the northeast edge of Spain's collision with Eurasia affected the interior, raising the Iberian Basin to form the Iberian Chain mountain range, north east of the centre. The Azores–Gibraltar transform zone activated at about 30 Ma. This zone appears as a ridge on the Atlantic Ocean floor, and is apparent even today as an earthquake zone. Africa moved eastwards with respect to Iberia and Eurasia. This opened up the Valencia Trough and the Balearic Basin. Extension in this south east side of Iberia spread from southern France. The spreading reached and formed the Alborian Basin between 23 and 20 Ma.

Africa converged towards Eurasia, and the direction changed from north north west to north west in the Tortonian. This change in compression formed the Baetic Cordillera on the Mediterranean coast in the Middle Miocene. Basins were inverted and raised up in the Iberian Central System, and also the Alboran Basin. The crust still continues to fold in these areas since the Pliocene. Some coastal areas have been uplifted hundreds of meters in the Pliocene. Also new shear zones appeared in the Alboran Basin.

The Ninyerola Gypsum unit is fifteen kilometres south of Valencia. It consists of layers of gypsum and marl and limestone. Nodules of gypsum from this formation have been used as alabaster for carving sculptures. This was deposited from a freshwater lake, high in sulphates but low in chlorides.

Iberian Cenozoic sedimentary basins

The Douro Basin in northwest Spain is the largest Cenozoic basin in Iberia. Oligocene and Miocene continental deposits are up to 2.5 km thick. It is bounded by the central system to the south, the Iberian range to the east, and the Cantabrian Mountains to the northeast. The Cantabrian Mountains are the main source of the sediments in this basin. The Douro River started to drain the basin 9.6 Ma by connecting it the Atlantic Ocean. Gold was mined in Roman times in the basin. Las Medulas is the most famous mine. Greasy wool was used to trap gold flakes washing past from the alluvial deposits. North of Ribón is another 2000-year-old gold mine.

Two Eocene basins in Portugal are the Mondego and Lower Tagus basins which are elongated in the southwest direction. Simultaneous with the formation of these grabens the Algarve Basin was uplifted. In the Miocene the Lusitanian Basin was compressed, and the Portuguese Central Range and Western Mountains were formed. These too trend south west. The mountains also form piedmont or fore-deep basins. Faults developed aligned south-southwest. These faults developed some pull-apart basins.

In the Late Pliocene (2.6 Ma) there was increased uplifting and previously deposited sediments were incised by erosion. The coast of Portugal has been rising at about 0.1 mm per year since then.

=== Ebro Basin ===
The Ebro Basin formed as a downwarp at the same time as the Pyrenees. From 55 to 37 Ma the basin was below sea level and filled with marine sediments. In the mid to late Eocene evaporites were formed as the sea dried up forming the Cardona Evaporites. It became a continental basin, until the end of the Oligocene. From Oligocene to Miocene the area was covered in an endorheic lake trapping the eroded rocks of the surrounding mountain ranges: Pyrenees, Iberian Range, and Catalan Coastal Range. From late Miocene the Ebro River drained this basin flowing to the Mediterranean.

=== Tagus Basin ===
The Tagus Basin received continental deposits from the end of Oligocene to the end of Miocene This basin is drained by the Tagus River to the Atlantic past Lisbon.

The As Pontes Basin in the far northwest of Iberia filled with alluvium and lacustrine deposits from late Oligocene to early Miocene.

=== Catalan Coastal Ranges ===
The Catalan Coastal Ranges were formed in the Eocene with compression, contributing to the closure of the Ebro Basin. Later in the Oligocene and Miocene extension occurred as the Valencia trough was opened up. The whole crust in the area was bent into a monocline. The mountains have a north east – south west trend, at an oblique angle to the original basin.

=== Volcanoes ===
Volcanoes along the Mediterranean margin formed due to mantle lithospheric thinning. The Levante field is at the south west end of the Valencia trough. Volcanoes are from 8 to 1 Ma. The north east volcanic province at the east end of the Pyrenees, dates from 14 Ma to 11,000 years ago. Volcanoes first formed in the Empordà Basin, then in the La Selva Basin and finally in the Cerdanya Basin. Almeria and Murcia have alkaline volcanoes.

== Quaternary ==
=== Valencia Trough ===
The Valencia Trough lies between the Mediterranean north east coast of Spain, near Barcelona, and the Balearic Islands. This is a northeast to southwest oriented depression between the continental slope of the Iberian Peninsula and the slope off the shelf around the Balearic Islands. This originally opened between Late Oligocene and early Miocene, at the same time as the Provençal Basin. The continental shelf off the Catalan coast is from six to 30 km wide. Several V-shaped canyons cut deeply into the shelf, among them the Foix, Besós, Arenys, La Fonda, and Creus Canyons. The Ebro margin, a shallow coastal shelf, is fed by the Ebro River, The shelf here is 70 km wide. The shelves on the Balearic margin are under 20 km wide; they have a low influx of sediments, and instead are dominated by carbonates.

At the base of the Valencia Trough is the Valencia Channel, This is a gully that carries sediment to the north east to the Provençal Basin.

The Valencia Trough consists of extended continental crust. At the deepest point the Mohorovičić discontinuity ("Moho") is only 8 km deep, whereas under the mainland it is 32 km down. Beneath the Balearics the depth rises back to 23–25 km. Other points under the Valencia Trough axis have a Moho at 15 to 10 km down. The lithosphere is only 50 to 80 km thick, and the mantle has an abnormally low speed of transmitted sound.

The crust in the trough went through a history similar to that of the mainland. It was compressed in the Variscan Orogeny, extended in the Mesozoic so that resulting basins filled with sediment, compressed back and lifted up in the Cretaceous, then eroded. In the Eocene and late Oligocene there were a couple of basins filled with terrestrial deposits.

In the uppermost Oligocene and lower Miocene rifting started, and continental deposits were made. followed by marine deposits on a shallow shelf. During this period the trough grew by extension to its present dimensions. In the middle and Upper Miocene clastic sediments were deposited under sea water. Then the level of the Mediterranean drastically dropped due to evaporation. During this Messinian salinity crisis gullies were cut deeply into the sediments exposed to the atmosphere, and Messinian salt deposits were encrusted onto the deeper parts. In the Pliocene and Holocene deltas were formed over the shallow parts and deep sea fans in the deeper parts.

The slopes around the trough have been affected by many underwater landslides. Mostly these are small, under 100 km^{2} in area. The so-called "Big '95" debris flow, is a large landslide off the coast from Castellón de la Plana, beyond the Columbretes Islands. This slide covers 2200 km^{2}, containing 26 km^{3}, or 50 gigatonnes of sediment. It is 110 km long, has an average thickness of 13 m, ranging from 600 m, to 1800 m below sea level. A carbon 14 date indicates the slide occurred before 9500 BC. It is believed to have been triggered by a volcanic dome, the same one that raised the Columbretes Islands above sea level.

=== Balearic Abyssal Plain ===
The Balearic Abyssal Plain lies to the east of the Balearic Islands. A large undersea slip deposit of unknown origin called the Balearic megaturbidite covers 77,000 km^{2}, and contains 600 km^{3} of sediment, at 10 m thick. The slip happened at the last low stand.

== Pleistocene ==
There are raised sandy or pebbly beaches along the coasts which have been partially cemented. These have been dated to 53,700 to 75,800 years old. Torca del Carlista has the largest cavern (La Grand Sala del GEV) in Europe. It is found in the Basque Country. It has an area of 76,620 square meters, with dimensions of 245 by 520 meters.

== Paleontology ==
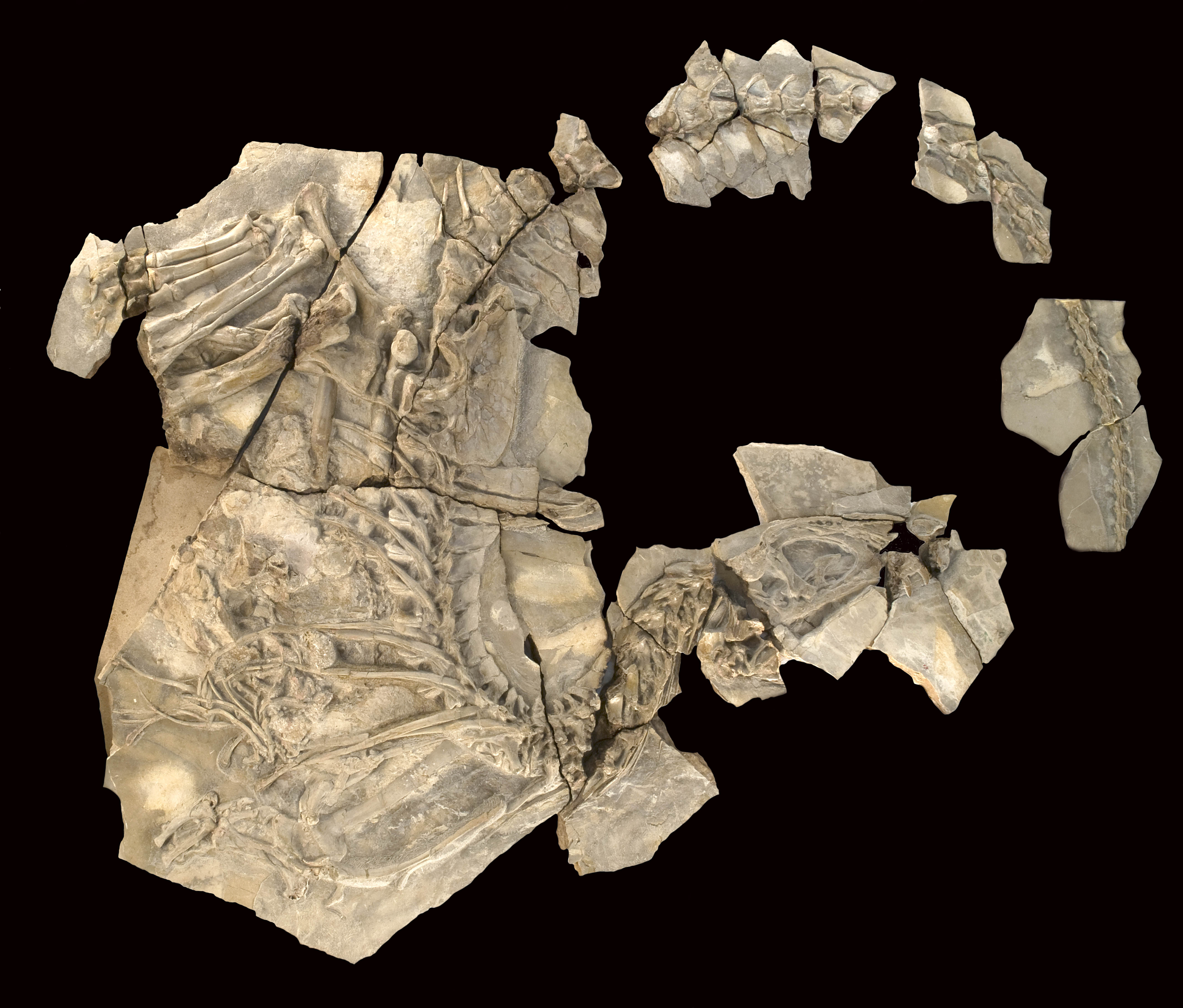
Concavenator corcovatus dinosaur fossil from Las Hoyas, Spain

Iberia is quite a rich region for paleontology, mainly Mesozoic and Miocene. Several important dinosaur localities are known in Portugal and Spain. In Portugal, the Lourinhã Formation is one of the richer Mesozoic units, mainly for dinosaurs and mammals. A bizarre dinosaur was discovered in Las Hoyas in Cuenca, Spain. The original animal was 6 meters long, had a hump and had feathers. The fossil dates from the Barremian stage of the Late Cretaceous and is called Concavenator corcovatus. Turiasaurus riodevensis, a truly giant dinosaur that lived between the Upper Jurassic and Lower Cretaceous, was also found in Riodeva in Teruel Spain. The animal was 37 meters long and weighed 40–48 tons.

The most recent remains of Neanderthals are known from Cueva Antón.

== Geophysical measurements ==
The crustal thickness is 30 to 35 km through most of Iberia, but thins to 28 km on the west coast. However mountainous areas are thicker. The crustal depth in the Iberian Massif is 30 to 35 km. The western Betics have crust 39 km thick and in three layers whereas the eastern Betics have a crust of 23 km thick in two layers. Along the coast near the Betics the crust is 23 to 25 km thick. Betic lithosphere (crust and solid mantle) is 100 to 110 km thick. Under the Alboran Sea the crust is 16 km thick. Alboran lithosphere is 40 km thick.

The Tagus and Douro basins are elevated and yet show a negative Bouguer anomaly. This is likely due to a less dense crust. In the Ossa Moena zone and South Portuguese zone there is a positive Bouguer anomaly, due to higher crustal density. Along the Mediterranean coast there is a positive Bouguer anomaly due to lithosphere thinned to less than 75 km.

The force exerted by the ridge push from the Atlantic sea floor is 3.0 TN/m (10^{12} newtons per meter); 54 Ma the force was lower at 2 TN/m.

GPS stations measure the slow movements due to continental drift and tectonic movements:

GAIA	Vila Nova de Gaia
CASC	Cascais
OALN	Observatório Astronómico de Lisboa Norte
OALS	Observatório Astronómico de Lisboa Sul
LAGO	Lagos
SFER	San Fernando
VILL	Villa Franca del Campo
MADR	Madrid

Heat flow is 60–70 mW/m^{2} on the Iberian Massif and in the Betics it is 100–120 mW/m^{2} in the Alboran Sea where the lithosphere is thinner. A low heat flow of 40 mW/m^{2} is measured in the far south of Portugal.

== Economic geology ==
=== Mining ===
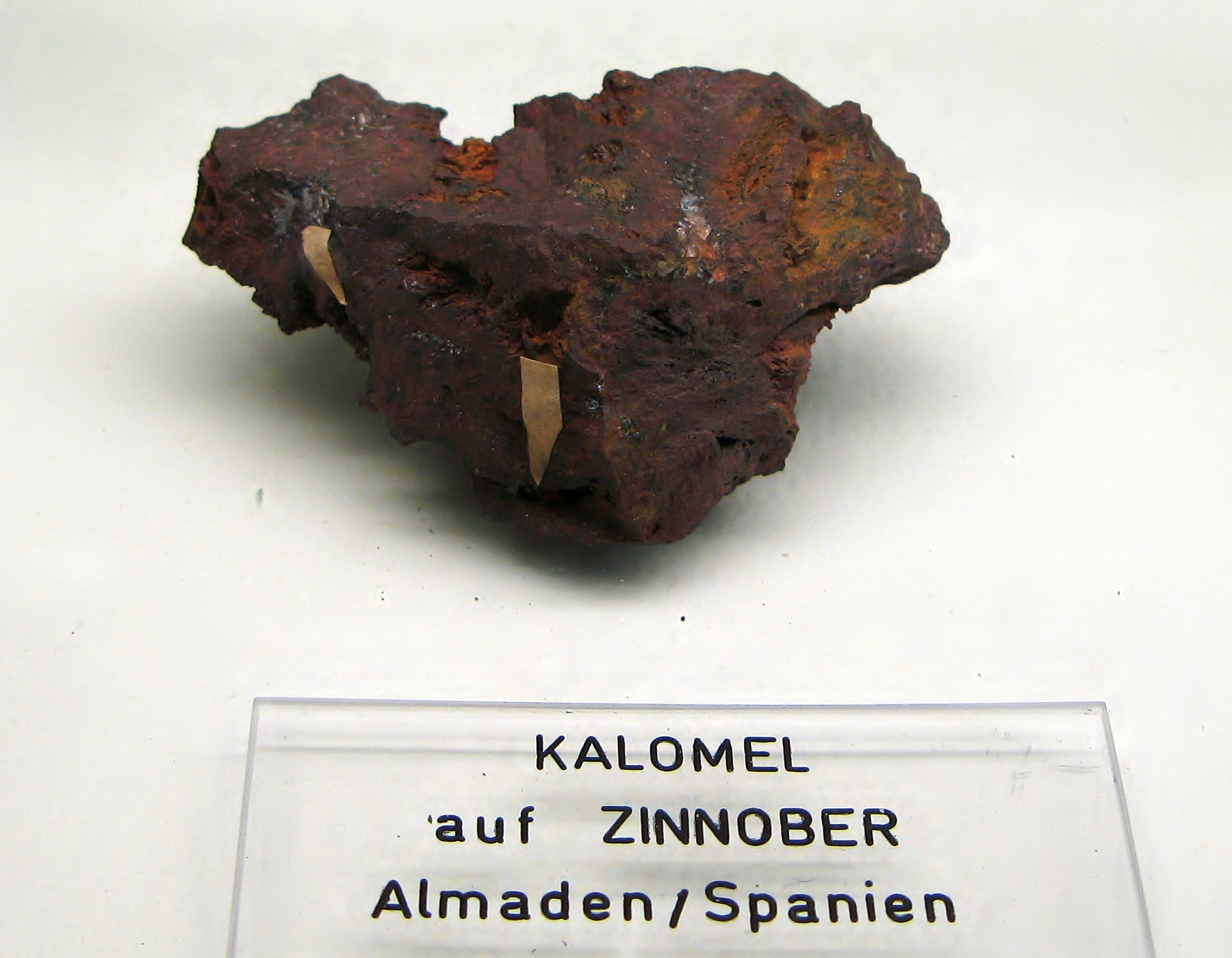
Cinnabar (mercury ore) from Almadén, Spain

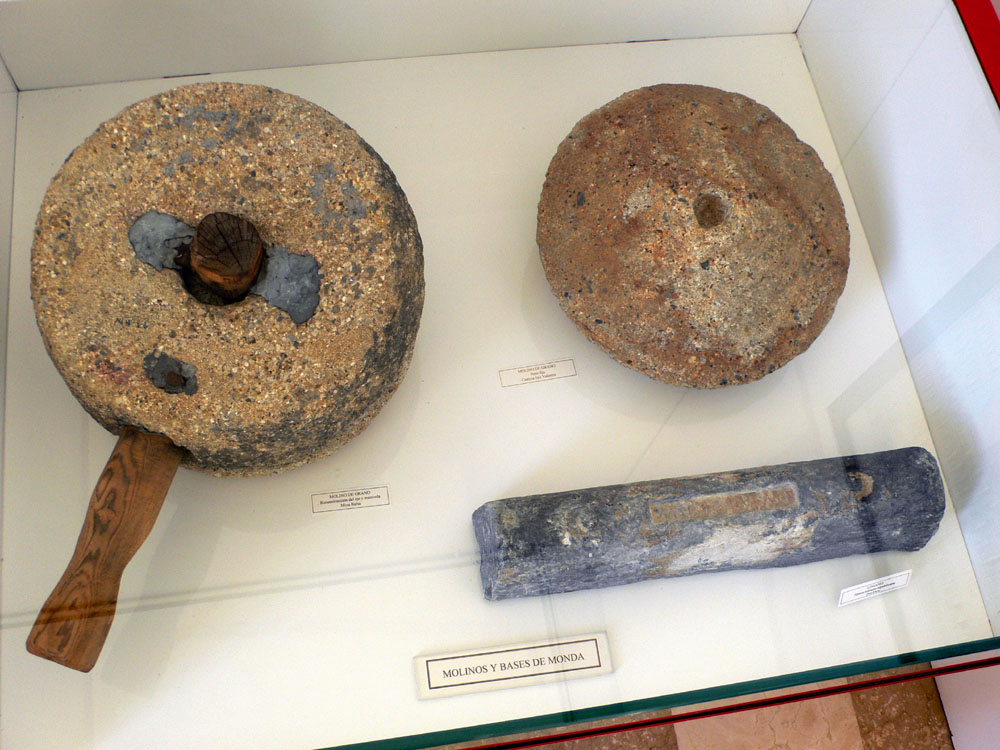
Roman mining tools from Portmán

Mining has a long history in Spain. Copper mining has taken place at Rio Tinto for 5,000 years. The world's largest deposit of mercury is located Almadén, Spain, which has produced 250,000 tons.

Mines at La Unión, Murcia produced lead, iron, silver, and zinc since Roman times but closed in 1991 due to depletion. Lead mines at Castulo near Linares, Jaén operated from ancient times until 1991. This is a part of the Linares–La Carolina mining district, where in the Bronze Age copper was mined. Roman mines operated at Arrayanes, La Cruz, and El Centenillo and Salas de Galiarda in Sierra Morena.

Black coal and anthracite was mined in the Palencia mining basin from Carboniferous deposits.

=== Geohazards ===
The Great Lisbon earthquake of 1 November 1755 was one of the most destructive earthquakes in history, killing around 100,000 people. The 1969 Portugal earthquake was much less severe; 13 people were killed in Morocco and Portugal.

== Global Boundary Stratotype Sections and Points ==
Several Global Boundary Stratotype Sections and Points are defined in the Iberian Peninsula.

Epoch	Stage	Age (mya)	Status	GSSP location	Defining markers	Geographic Coordinates	References
Eocene	Lutetian	48.07		Gorrondatxe sea-cliff section, Western Pyrenees, Basque Country, Spain	Biologic: First appearance of Hantkenina (Planktonic foraminifera).	43.3796°N 3.0143°W	
Paleocene	Thanetian	59.24		Zumaia Section, Basque Country, Spain	Magnetic: Base of magnetic polarity chronozone C26n.	43.2996°N 2.2609°W	
Paleocene	Selandian	61.66		Zumaia Section, Basque Country, Spain	Chemical: Onset of sea-level drop and carbon isotope shift.; Magnetic: 30 precession cycles after the top of magnetic polarity Chron 27n	43.2992°N 2.2610°W	
Cretaceous	Santonian	85.7		Candidate section: Olazagutia, Spain	Biologic: First appearance of Cladoceramus undulatoplicatus (Inoceramid bivalve).	–	
Cretaceous	Barremian	125.77		Candidate section: Río Argos, Caravaca de la Cruz, Murcia Province, Spain	Biologic: First appearance of Spitidiscus hugii or Spitidiscus vandeckii group (Ammonite).	–	–
Cretaceous	Valanginian	137.05		Candidates section: Cañada Luenga, Betic Cordillera, Spain	Biologic: First appearance of Calpionellites darderi (Calpionellid).; Biologic: First appearance of Thurmanniceras pertransiens (Ammonite).	–	–
Jurassic	Bajocian	170.9		Cabo Mondego, Portugal	Biologic: First appearance of Hyperlioceras mundum, Hyperlioceras furcatum, Braunsina aspera, and Braunsina elegantula(Ammonite); Biologic: First appearance of genus Hyperlioceras (Ammonite).	40.1992°N 8.9042°W	
Jurassic	Aalenian	174.7		Fuentelsaz, Spain	Biologic: First appearance of Leioceras opalinum and Leioceras lineatum; Biologic: First appearance of genus Leioceras (Ammonite).	41.1708°N 1.8333°W	
Jurassic	Toarcian	184.2		Peniche, Portugal	Biologic: Near first appearance of Eodactylites fauna (Ammonite).; Biologic: Coincides with Protogrammoceras paltus horizon of NW-Europe.	–	–

== History of geology ==
=== Spain ===
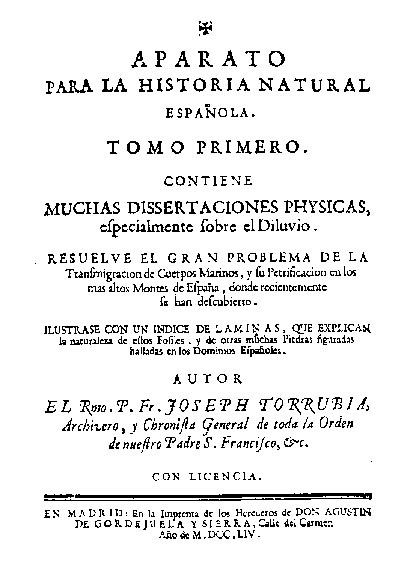
Title page of Aparato para la Historia Natural Española

In the 17th century physician Alfonso Limón Montero studied evaporation of water from rivers and springs in Spain and proposed a model of the Water Cycle. However it was only in the 18th century that treatises on geology were published. In the year 1754 José Torrubia published Aparato para la Historia Natural Española considered the first treatise written in Spanish defending the thesis of the universal flood and drawing fossils from the Iberian Peninsula and elsewhere. In 1771, King Carlos III founded the Real Gabinete de Historia Natural de Madrid (Royal Chamber of Natural History of Madrid) Guillermo Bowles, with the assistance of Nicolás de Azara, published Introducción a la Historia Natural y a la Geografía Física de España (Introduction to the Natural History and Physical Geography of Spain) a work which collected data on geological sites, rocks and minerals he collected in his travels around the peninsula. Between 1797 and 1798 the German Christian Herrgen translated the work of Johann Friedrich Wilhelm Widenmann, Orictognosia into Spanish. Because of the prestige acquired by the translation, King Carlos IV named him editor of Anales de Historia Natural (Annals of Natural History), a publication that commenced in 1799.

Agustín Yáñez y Girona first used the term geology in his 1819 work called Descripción origlognóstica y geológica de la montaña de Montjuich. Under the reign of Fernando VII the Mining Act of 1825 was enacted, which regulated private mining companies. In 1834 Guillermo Schulz produced the first geological map in Spain, a 1:400 000 scale map of the area of Galicia.

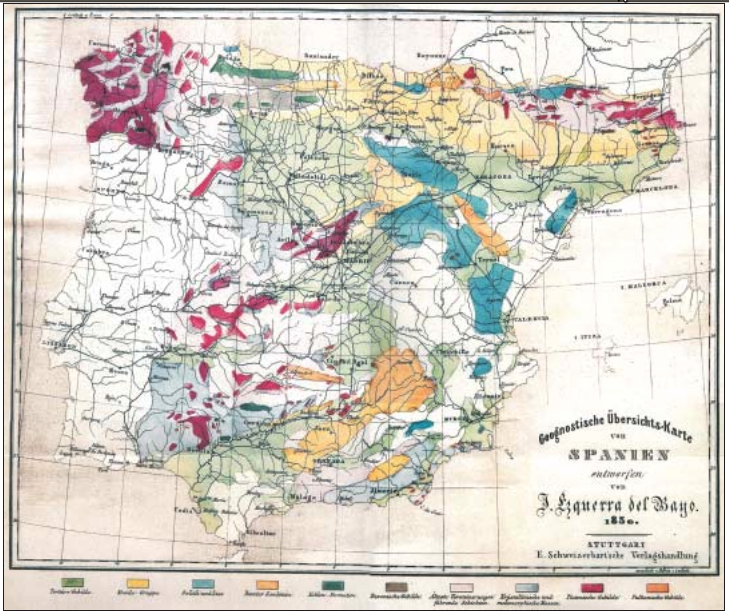
the first geological map of Spain drawn by Joaquín Ezquerra del Bayo

Charles Lyell visited Spain in the summer of 1830 and also in the winter of 1853. Lyell's visit to the Pyrenees led him to study the orogeny that produced the mountain chain. He discovered that they had formed over a long period of time, and not the result of a single large catastrophe, as was previously believed. This led to Lyell's concept of geological history being developed. His book Elements of Geology from 1830 to 1833, was translated into Spanish by Ezquerra del Bayo in 1847. This was used as a textbook, as it was the first modern geology text available for the general public in Spain. This spread Lyell's ideas and terminology.

Ezquerra del Bayo created the first geological map of Spain in 1850 Joaquin Ezquerra del Bayo founded the Comisión para la Carta Geológica de Madrid y General del Reino in 1849. In 1850 this renamed to Comisión del Mapa Geológico de España. The organisation is now called Instituto Geológico y Minero de España. Its purpose was to publish books and maps of Spain. Guillermo Schulz drew a high quality map of the geology of the Asturias. This was followed by del Bayo's map of Spain and then Moritz Willkomm's geology map of the entire Iberian Peninsula.

The University of Madrid first offered a subject called "Geology and Paleontology" in 1854 when Juan Vilanova y Piera took up the chair of Geology and Paleontology.

The Real Sociedad Española de Historia Natural (Royal Spanish Society of Natural History) was established in 1871. Miguel Colmeiro y Penido was the organisation's first president. Comisión del Mapa Geológico de España went into a decline until 1873 when Manuel Fernández de Castro issued a decree to refound the commission and to start studying geology again. Between 1875 and 1891 Lucas Mallada y Pueyo published in the Boletín Geológico y Minero the work Sinopsis de las especies fósiles que se han encontrado en España (Synopsis of the fossil species that have been found in Spain). In 1892 he published the General Catalogue of fossil species found in Spain, a work that includes 4,058 species. In 1882, the Museu de Geologia (aka the Museu Martorell) was opened in Barcelona.

The 14th International Geological Congress was held in Madrid in 1926. The Spanish Civil War and its aftermath marked a decline in the study of geology in Spain.

In 1972 the MAGNA plan was created to produce 1:50000 scale maps of Spain (this work began in Portugal in 1952).

Between 1986 and 1987 a Spanish-French collaboration called ECORS-Pirineos made a seismic vertical reflection profile 250 km long through the Pyrenees. By 2000 there were six seismic profiles through the Pyrenees which provided a wealth of information of the thickness of the crust and the internal structure of the orogen.

=== Portugal ===
Between 1852 and 1857, Carlos Ribeiro made a geological map at 1:480 000 scale of the Portuguese region between the Douro and Tagus rivers and did geological work in Alentejo. Portugal started the Comissão Geológica do Reino in 1857. It was directed by Carlos Ribeiro and Pereira da Costa. Ribeiro with Nery Delgado, published the first geological map of Portugal, at a scale of 1:500 000. This was reissued and updated in 1899 by the Swiss geologist Paul Choffat.

During World War II, the French government employed Georges Zbyszewski to document Portuguese mineral deposits, especially tungsten. In the following years Zbyszewski published about 300 papers on geology and produced five 1:50 000 scale geological maps. The Museu Geológico in Lisbon is part of the National Laboratory of Energy and Geology. It contains specimens dating back to 1859 collected by Carlos Ribeiro, Nery Delgado, Paul Choffat and others.

== See also ==
- Topographical relief of Spain
