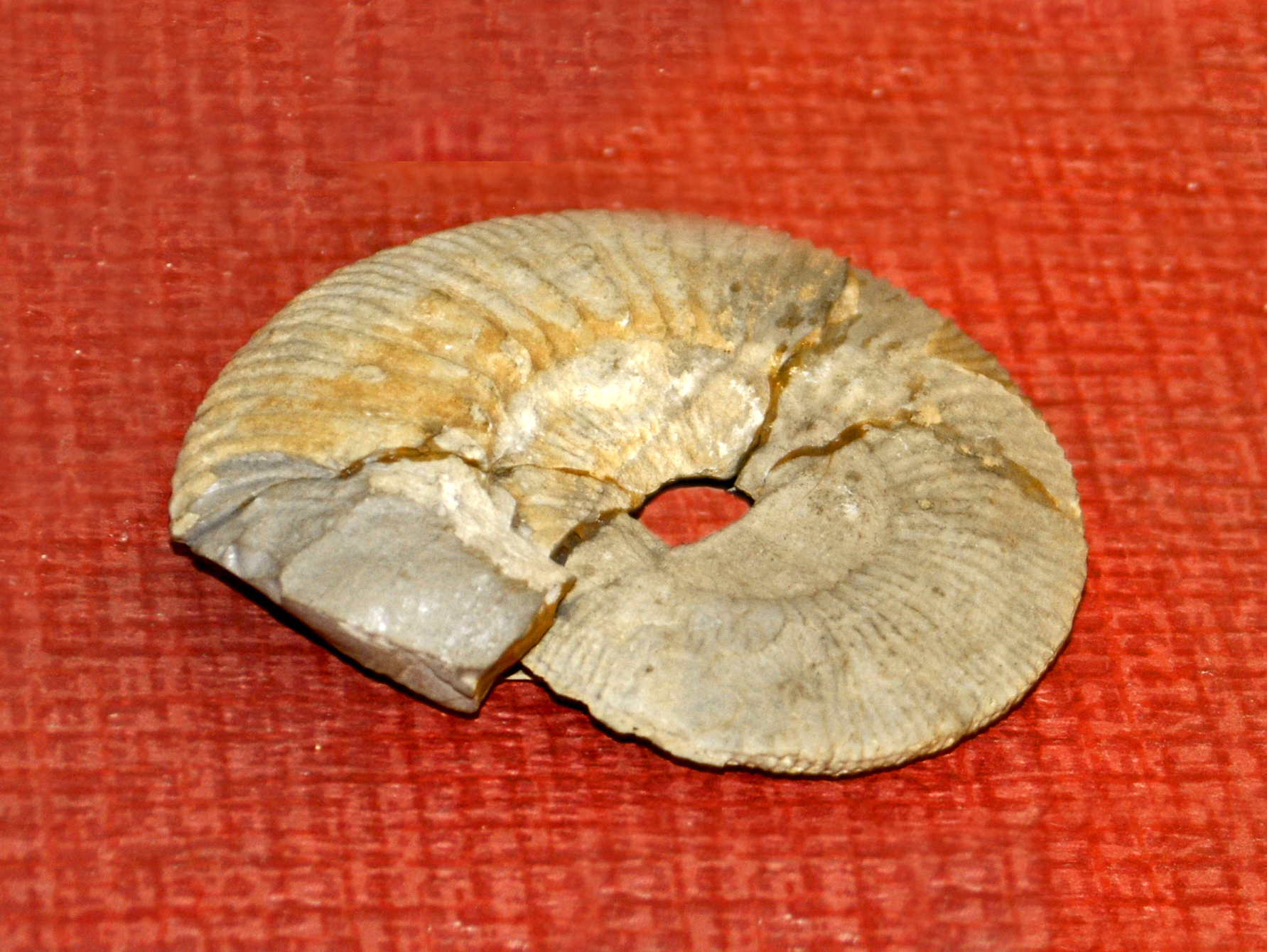
- Fossil shell of Berriasella jabronensis from Gard (France), on display at Galerie de paléontologie et d'anatomie comparée in Paris

Scientific classification
- Kingdom: Animalia
- Phylum: Mollusca
- Class: Cephalopoda
- Subclass: †Ammonoidea
- Order: †Ammonitida
- Family: †Neocomitidae
- Subfamily: †Berriasellinae
- Genus: †Berriasella; Uhlig, 1905

Species
- B. berthei Toucas 1890; B. calisto d'Orbigny 1850; B. callisto d'Orbigny 1847; B. carpathica Mazenot 1939; B. colombiana Haas 1960; B. jacobi Mazenot 1939; B. oppeli Kilian 1889; B. picteti Killian 1910; B. sabatasi Le Hegarat 1973; B. subprivasensis Krantz 1928; B. zacatecana Imlay 1939

= Berriasella =

Berriasella Temporal range: Tithonian-Berriasian ~150–145 Ma

Genus of molluscs (fossil)

Berriasella is a discoidal evolute perisphinctacean ammonite, and type genus for the neocomitid subfamily Berriasellinae. Its ribbing is distinct, consisting of both simple and bifurcated ribs that extend from the umbilical seam across the venter; its whorl section generally compressed, the venter more or less narrowly rounded. The species Berriasella jacobi traditionally has been regarded an index fossil defining the base of the Cretaceous, however since 2016 this had been replaced by the first occurrence of Calpionella alpina. Some authors regard B. jacobi as instead belonging to the genus Strambergella.

Berriasella, named by Uhlig, 1905, is known from the late Upper Jurassic, Tithonian, to the early Lower Cretaceous, Berriasian and has a fairly worldwide distribution.

== Distribution ==
Fossils of Berriasella have been found in:

Jurassic

- Latady and Himalia Ridge Formations, Antarctica
- Los Molles Formation, Argentina
- Guasasa Formation, Cuba
- Chia Gara Formation, Iraq
- Muktinath, Nepal
- Punta Moreno Formation, Peru
- Hajar Formation, Yemen

Cretaceous

- President Beaches Formation, Antarctica
- Guchuochun Formation, China
- Buenavista Breccia, Colombia
- Stramberk Formation, Czech Republic
- France
- Szentivánhegy Limestone, Hungary
- Giumal Sandstone, India
- Shal Formation, Iran
- Chia Gara Formation, Iraq
- Carbonera and Taraises Formations, Mexico
- Pieniny Limestone and Rogozno Formation, Poland
- Chigan Formation, Russia
- Tollo and Miravetes Formations, Spain
- Dvuyakornaya Formation, Ukraine
- Hajar Formation, Yemen
- Lo valdes Formation, Chile
