= Calpionellites =

Calpionellites Temporal range: Valanginian ~139.8–132.9 Ma

Scientific classification
- Domain: Eukaryota
- (unranked): SAR
- (unranked): Alveolata
- Family: Calpionellidae
- Genus: Calpionellites Colom, 1948

Species
- Calpionellites darderi

Genus of protists

Calpionellites is an extinct genus of single celled eukaryotes. Their fossils are found in rocks dating to the Valanginian stage of the Early Cretaceous.

== Biostratigraphic significance ==
The first occurrence of the species Calpionellites darderi marks the beginning of the Valanginian and thus end of the Berriasian.

== Distribution ==
Fossils of the genus have been found in:

- Puke, Albania
- Steinmühl Formation, Austria
- Guasasa Formation, Cuba
- Lake Rożnów, Poland
- Lapos Formation, Romania
- Miravetes and Tollo Formations, Spain

== See also ==
- Calpionella
