= Blanfordiceras =

Blanfordiceras Temporal range: 145.5–140.2 Ma

Scientific classification
- Domain: Eukaryota
- Kingdom: Animalia
- Phylum: Mollusca
- Class: Cephalopoda
- Subclass: †Ammonoidea
- Order: †Ammonitida
- Family: †Neocomitidae
- Subfamily: †Berriasellinae
- Genus: †Blanfordiceras; Crossman, 1907

Species
- Blanfordiceras acuticosta Uhlig 1910; Blanfordiceras applanatum Uhlig 1910; Blanfordiceras boehmi Uhlig 1910; Blanfordiceras cricki Uhlig 1910; Blanfordiceras latidomus Uhlig 1910; Blanfordiceras muktinathense Helmstaedt 1969; Blanfordiceras rotundidoma Uhlig 1910; Blanfordiceras subquadratum Uhlig 1910; Blanfordiceras tenuicostatum Collignon 1960; Blanfordiceras wallichi Gray 1832

Extinct genus of ammonites

Blanfordiceras is a strongly ribbed, evolute ammonite included in the perisphinctacean family, Neocomitidae that lived during the latest Jurassic. The shell of Blanfordiceras is discoidal, with evolute coiling and all whorls visible so as to have a broad umbilicus. Exposed whorls are ornamented with strong ribbing that arises from the umbilicus, bifurcating on the outer flanks and extending onto the venter. In general form Blanfordiceras is similar to Berriasella, although with a more rounded whorl section.
