= Raimondiceras =

Raimondiceras Temporal range: Tithonian

Scientific classification
- Kingdom: Animalia
- Phylum: Mollusca
- Class: Cephalopoda
- Subclass: †Ammonoidea
- Order: †Ammonitida
- Family: †Neocomitidae
- Subfamily: †Berriasellinae
- Genus: †Raimondiceras; Spath, 1924

Genus of molluscs (fossil)

Raimondiceras is Upper Jurassic ammonite belonging to the ammonitida family.

== Distribution ==
Jurassic deposits in Antarctica and Colombia
