= SFER =

SFER may refer to:

- The stock market symbol of Salvatore Ferragamo
- The GPS station San Fernando in the Iberian Peninsula
