= San Cayetano Formation =

San Cayetano Formation may refer to:

- San Cayetano Formation, Cuba, Jurassic geologic formation of Cuba
- San Cayetano Formation, Colombia, Paleocene geologic formation of Colombia
- San Cayetano Formation, Ecuador, Miocene geologic formation of Ecuador
