= Andiceras =

Andiceras Temporal range: Tithonian ~150–145 Ma

Scientific classification
- Domain: Eukaryota
- Kingdom: Animalia
- Phylum: Mollusca
- Class: Cephalopoda
- Subclass: †Ammonoidea
- Order: †Ammonitida
- Family: †Neocomitidae
- Subfamily: †Berriasellinae
- Genus: †Andiceras; Krantz, 1926

Species
- See text

Extinct genus of ammonites

Andiceras is an enigmatic perisphinctacean ammonite belonging to the neocomitid subfamily Berriasellinae. Andiceras was named by Krantz in 1926 and is known from Tithonian sediments in Argentina and the Chinameca and La Caja Formations, Mexico.
