= Berriasella jacobi =

Berriasella jacobi Temporal range:

Scientific classification
- Kingdom: Animalia
- Phylum: Mollusca
- Class: Cephalopoda
- Subclass: †Ammonoidea
- Order: †Ammonitida
- Family: †Neocomitidae
- Genus: †Berriasella
- Species: †B. jacobi

Binomial name
- †Berriasella jacobi Mazenot 1939

Extinct species of mollusc

Berriasella jacobi is an extinct species of ammonite from the late Jurassic and early Cretaceous. Because of its unique stratigraphic position, it is used as an index fossil to determine the boundary of the Cretaceous and Jurassic periods. The Berriasella jacobi zone defines the substage of the Lower Berriasian, the Berriasian being the lowest stage of the Cretaceous. However, due to the species limited geographic distribution, several other candidates have also been nominated, including Calpionella alpina.
