= Kurpaty =

Kurpaty Курпати
- Urban-type settlement
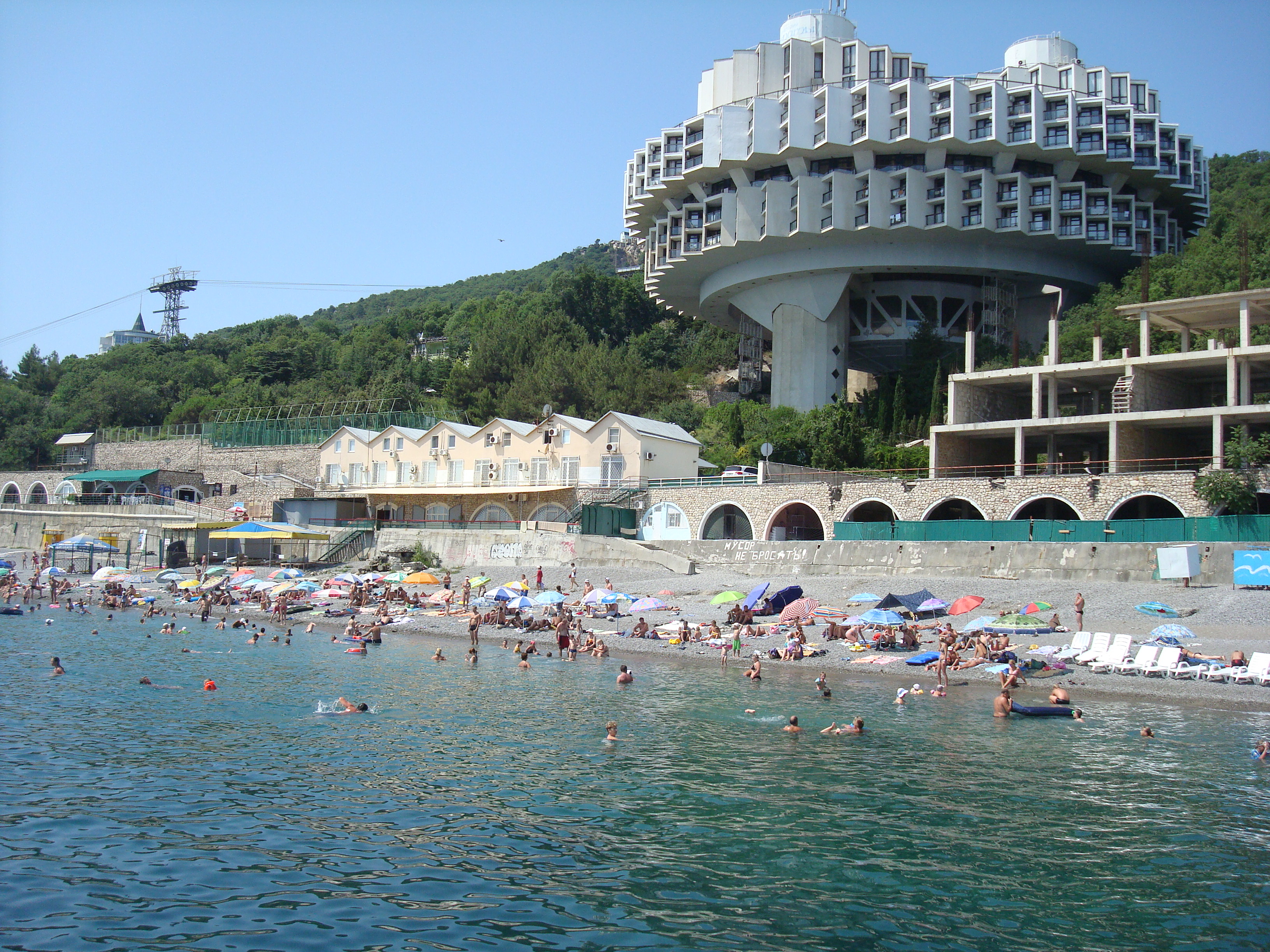
- Druzhba Sanatorium

- Location of Kurpaty in Crimea
- Coordinates: 44°26′41″N 34°07′36″E
- Republic: Crimea
- Municipality: Yalta Municipality
- Town status: 1971

Area
  - Total: 0.6965 km^{2} (0.2689 sq mi)
- Elevation: 269 m (883 ft)

Population (2014)
  - Total: 136
  - Density: 195/km^{2} (506/sq mi)
- Time zone: UTC+4 (MSK)
- Postal code: 98659
- Area code: +380 654
- Climate: Cfb
- Website: http://rada.gov.ua/

Kurpaty (Ukrainian: Курпати; Russian: Курпаты; Crimean Tatar: Kurpatı) is an urban-type settlement in the Yalta Municipality of the Autonomous Republic of Crimea, a territory recognized by a majority of countries as part of Ukraine and annexed by Russia as the Republic of Crimea.

Kurpaty is located on Crimea's southern shore at an elevation of 269 metres (883 ft). Nearby is the Dvuyakornaya Formation, containing several types of fossil. The settlement is located 8 km (5.0 mi) south west from Yalta. It is administratively subordinate to the Livadiya Settlement Council. Its population was 143 in the 2001 Ukrainian census. Current population: 136 (2014 Census).
