= Kilianella =

Kilianella Temporal range: Berriasian–Valanginian

Scientific classification
- Kingdom: Animalia
- Phylum: Mollusca
- Class: Cephalopoda
- Subclass: †Ammonoidea
- Order: †Ammonitida
- Family: †Neocomitidae
- Subfamily: †Neocomitinae
- Genus: †Kilianella; Uhlig, 1905

Genus of molluscs (fossil)

Kilianella is a genus of the ammonite family Neocomitidae. The shell of Kilianella is evolute with a slightly grooved venter and covered by strong, gently flexious, single or bifurcating ribs.

Kilianella has a widespread distribution on the Lower Cretaceous and has been found in the Upper Berriasian to Upper Valanginian of the Western U.S., Mexico, China, southern Asia, and Europe.
