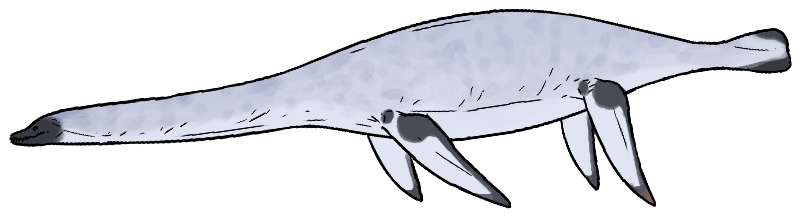
- Restoration

Scientific classification
- Domain: Eukaryota
- Kingdom: Animalia
- Phylum: Chordata
- Class: Reptilia
- Superorder: †Sauropterygia
- Order: †Plesiosauria
- Family: †Cryptoclididae
- Genus: †Vinialesaurus; Gasparini et al., 2002
- Species: †V. caroli

Binomial name
- †Vinialesaurus caroli Gasparini et al., 2002

Synonyms
- Cryptocleidus caroli De la Torre & Rojas, 1949

= Vinialesaurus =

Vinialesaurus Temporal range: Oxfordian ~161–156 Ma

Extinct genus of reptiles

Vinialesaurus is a genus of plesiosaur from the Late Jurassic (Oxfordian) Jagua Formation of Pinar del Río, Cuba. The combinatio nova of the type species is Vinialesaurus caroli, first described as the subspecies Cryptocleidus? cuervoi caroli by Ricardo De la Torre and Luis Rojas in 1949 under the holotype MNHNCu P 3008, and redescribed by Zulma Gasparini, Bardet and Iturralde in 2002. The authors of the 2002 paper considered Vinialesaurus distinct enough from Cryptocleidus to warrant its own genus, but it was a cryptoclidid.

The name Vinialesaurus honors Viñales, the town in western Cuba where the fossil of Vinialesaurus was discovered. The specific name honours the discoverer, Carlos de la Torre y Huerta. The holotype consists of the front skull, front lower jaws, and the anterior two vertebrae (atlas and axis). It was prepared in the American Museum of Natural History in 1991/1992.

== See also ==
- List of plesiosaur genera
- Timeline of plesiosaur research
