= Jagua Formation =

Geologic formation in Cuba

- Stratigraphic range: Mid-Late Oxfordian; ~158–156 Ma
- Type: Geological formation
- Sub-units: Pan de Azúcar, Zacarías, Pimienta & Jagua Vieja Members
- Underlies: Guasasa Formation
- Overlies: San Cayetano Formation
- Thickness: 160 m (520 ft)

Lithology
- Primary: Shale, limestone

Location
- Coordinates: 22.7°N 83.6°W
- Region: Pinar del Río Province
- Country: Cuba
- Extent: Sierra de los Órganos, Sierra del Rosario

Type section
- Named for: Jagua
- Jagua Formation (Cuba)

The Jagua Formation is a Late Jurassic (middle to late Oxfordian) geologic formation in the Sierra de los Órganos and Sierra del Rosario mountain ranges in Pinar del Río Province, western Cuba. Plesiosaur, pliosaur, pterosaur, metriorhynchid, turtle and dinosaur remains are among the fossils that have been recovered from its strata.

== Description ==
The formation comprises marine shales and limestones. The 60 metres (200 ft) thick Jagua Vieja Member consists of black shales and horizontally laminated marly micritic to biomicritic limestones. The latter contains calcareous concretions which the fossils are found in. The formation overlies the San Cayetano Formation and is overlain by the Guasasa Formation. The bedding direction is steeply dipping towards the northwest.

== Fossil content ==
=== Vertebrate paleofauna ===
Based on Iturralde-Vinent & Izquierdo (2015):

Color key: Taxon / Reclassified taxon / Taxon falsely reported as present / Dubious taxon or junior synonym / Ichnotaxon / Ootaxon / Morphotaxon

Notes
Uncertain or tentative taxa are in small text
~~crossed out~~ taxa are discredited.

==== Bony fishes ====
Bony fish of the Jagua Formation
| Genus | Species | Location | Stratigraphic position | Description | Notes | Image |
|---|---|---|---|---|---|---|
| Aspidorhynchus | A. arawaki | | Jagua Vieja Mb. | A aspidorhynchid fish | | |
| Caturus | C. deani | Valle los Jazmines, Jagua Vieja | Jagua Vieja Mb. | A caturid halecomorph. In need of taxonomic revision. | | |
| Eugnathides | E. browni | Mogote La Mina | Jagua Vieja Mb. | A pachycormiform fish. In need of taxonomic revision. | | |
| Gyrodus | G. macropthalmus cubensis | Mogote La Mina | Jagua Vieja Mb. | A pycnodont. | | |
| Hypsocormus | H. leedsi | Laguna de Piedra | Jagua Vieja Mb. | A pachycormiform fish. In need of taxonomic revision. | | |
| Lepidotes | L. gloriae | Jagua Vieja | Jagua Vieja Mb. | A lepidotid lepisosteiform. | | |
| ?Leptolepis | L. euspondylus | Mogote La Mina | Jagua Vieja Mb. | A leptolepid fish. In need of taxonomic revision. | | |
| Luisichthys | L. vinalesensis | Jagua Vieja | Jagua Vieja Mb. | A varasichthyid fish | | |
| Pholidophorus | P. sp. | | | A pholidophorid fish | | |
| Sauropsis | S. woodwardi | Viñales | | A pachycormiform fish. In need of taxonomic revision. | | |

==== Reptiles ====
===== Dinosaurs =====
| Genus | Species | Location | Stratigraphic position | Description | Notes | Image |
|---|---|---|---|---|---|---|
| Somphospondyli indet. | | Jagua Vieja | Jagua Vieja Mb. | A somphospondylan sauropod, the only dinosaur known from the formation. Previously identified as a camarasaurid. If it is a somphospondylan, it is the only record of this group from the early Late Jurassic of the Americas. Material consists of a first or second metacarpal, now lost. | | |

===== Pterosaurs =====
| Genus | Species | Location | Stratigraphic position | Description | Notes | Image |
|---|---|---|---|---|---|---|
| Cacibupteryx | C. caribensis | Mogote Jagua Vieja | Jagua Vieja Mb. | A rhamphorhynchid pterosaur | | |
| Nesodactylus | N. hesperius | Hoyo del Palmar; 10 km (6.2 mi) northeast of Viñales | Jagua Vieja Mb. | A rhamphorhynchid pterosaur | | |

===== Crocodylomorphs =====
| Genus | Species | Location | Stratigraphic position | Description | Notes | Image |
|---|---|---|---|---|---|---|
| Cricosaurus | C. suevicus | Puerta de Ancón; Sierra de Guasasa | Jagua Vieja Mb. | A metriorhynchid thalattosuchian | | |
| Geosaurus | G. sp. | | | A geosaurine metriorhynchid | | |
| Thalattosuchia indet. | | Hoyo de la Sierra | | A thalattosuchian of uncertain affinities. | | |

===== Plesiosaurs =====
| Genus | Species | Location | Stratigraphic position | Description | Notes | Image |
|---|---|---|---|---|---|---|
| ?"Cryptocleidus" | "C." vignalensis | Laguna de Piedra | Jagua Vieja Mb. | A sauropterygian, nomen dubium. | | |
| Gallardosaurus | G. iturraldei | Sierra de Caiguanabo; ~8 km (5.0 mi) east of Viñales | Jagua Vieja Mb. | A pliosaurid plesiosaur | | |
| Vinialesaurus | V. caroli | Viñales | | A cryptoclidid plesiosaur | | |

===== Ichthyosaurs =====
| Genus | Species | Location | Stratigraphic position | Description | Notes | Image |
|---|---|---|---|---|---|---|
| Ichthyosauria indet. | | Laguna de Piedra | Jagua Vieja Mb. | An indeterminate ichthyosaur, initially described as "Ichthyosaurus torrey" | | |
| Ophthalmosauridae Indet. | Indeterminate | Viñales | | | | |

===== Turtles =====
| Genus | Species | Location | Stratigraphic position | Description | Notes | Image |
|---|---|---|---|---|---|---|
| Caribemys | C. oxfordensis | Valle de Viñales | | A platychelyid pan-pleurodiran turtle | | |

=== Other fossils ===
- Favreina
- Globochaete
- Gryphaea mexicana - Pan de Azúcar Mb.
- Liostrea mairei
- L. sandalina - Zacarías Mb.
- Nanogyra (Nanogyra) nana - Zacarías Mb.
- Ostrea broughtoni - Zacarías Mb.
- Plicatula cf. weymouthiana - Zacarías Mb.
- Voltzia palmeri
- Perisphinctes sp.

== See also ==
- Plesiosaur stratigraphic distribution
- List of pterosaur-bearing stratigraphic units
