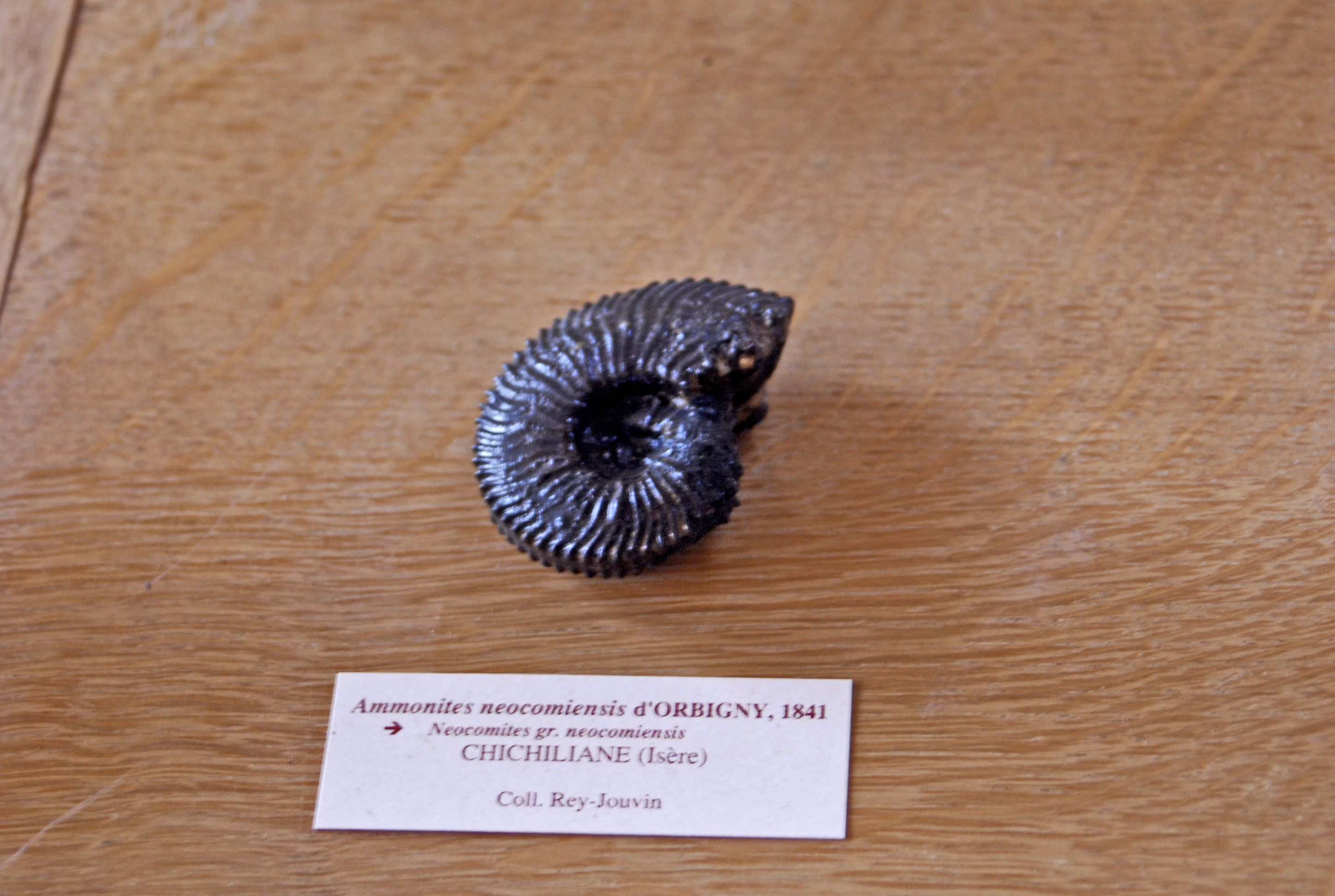
- Fossil of Neocomites neocomiensis from France, on display at Galerie de paléontologie et d'anatomie comparée in Paris

Scientific classification
- Kingdom: Animalia
- Phylum: Mollusca
- Class: Cephalopoda
- Subclass: †Ammonoidea
- Order: †Ammonitida
- Family: †Neocomitidae
- Subfamily: †Neocomitinae
- Genus: †Neocomites; Uhlig, 1905

Species
- N. (Eristavites); N. (Neocomites); N. (Teschenites); N. (Varlheideites)

= Neocomites =

Neocomites Temporal range: Berriasian-Hauterivian ~145–130 Ma

Genus of molluscs (fossil)

Neocomites is a genus of ammonite from the Lower Cretaceous, Berriasian to Hauterivian, and type genus for the Neocomitidae.

== Description ==
The shell of Neocomites is fairly involute and compressed with flattish sides; covered with flexuous ribs that branch in small sheaves from faint umbilical tubercles, in some branching again or intercaled further out on the whorls, ending in small oblique bullae in either side of a smooth flat venter. Ribs may cross the venter transversely on later whorls. Sutures have deep 1st lateral lobes.

== Distribution ==
Neocomites has a fairly widespread distribution and has been found in such places as central and southern Europe, North Africa, Madagascar, northern India, Borneo, Sumatra, Texas, Mexico, Colombia (Macanal Formation, Eastern Ranges), Peru, and Argentina.
