= Calpionellites darderi =

Calpionellites darderi Temporal range: Valanginian

Scientific classification
- Domain: Eukaryota
- Clade: Diaphoretickes
- Clade: SAR
- Clade: Alveolata
- Phylum: Ciliophora
- Class: Spirotrichea
- Order: Tintinnida
- Family: †Codonellopsidae
- Genus: †Calpionellites
- Species: †C. darderi

Binomial name
- †Calpionellites darderi (Colom, 1934)

Species of single-celled organism

Calpionellites darderi is an extinct planktonic eukaryote and an important index fossil for the Lower Cretaceous stratigraphy. The first appearance of C. darderi marks the beginning of the Valanginian. It also defines the base of the "Calpionellid Zone E". The species was first described by Colom in 1934 and is part of the Calpionellites genus.
