= Argentiniceras =

Argentiniceras Temporal range: Berriasian

Scientific classification
- Kingdom: Animalia
- Phylum: Mollusca
- Class: Cephalopoda
- Subclass: †Ammonoidea
- Order: †Ammonitida
- Family: †Neocomitidae
- Subfamily: †Neocomitinae
- Genus: †Argentiniceras; Spath, 1924

Species
- A. argentinum Steuer, 1897; A. bituberculatum Leanza, 1945; A. fasciculatum Steuer, 1897; A. loncochensis Steuer, 1897; A. longiceps Steuer; A. malarguense Steuer, 1897; A. mintaqi Howarth, 1998; A. mutatum Steuer, 1897; A. noduliferus Steuer, 1897

Synonyms
- Andesites

Genus of molluscs (fossil)

Argentiniceras is an extinct genus of cephalopod belonging to the Ammonite subclass. It belongs to the class Cephalopoda. Its fossils were found in Russia, Yemen, India, Mediterranean, Canada and South America.
