= Frenguelliceras =

Frenguelliceras Temporal range: Valanginian

Scientific classification
- Kingdom: Animalia
- Phylum: Mollusca
- Class: Cephalopoda
- Subclass: †Ammonoidea
- Order: †Ammonitida
- Family: †Neocomitidae
- Genus: †Frenguelliceras; Leanza, 1945

Genus of molluscs (fossil)

Frenguelliceras is an ammonite genus from the Lower Cretaceous included in the perisphinctoid family Neocomitidae named by Leanza in 1945. The type species, F. magister, is from the Valanginian,(Lower Cretaceous), of Argentina.

Frenguelliceras has an evolute, flat sided shell with coarse, simple or widely splayed ribs dividing from the umbilical edge -inner margin of the outer whorl; venter -outer rim- with a smooth groove, bordered by incipiently tuberculate rib endings.
