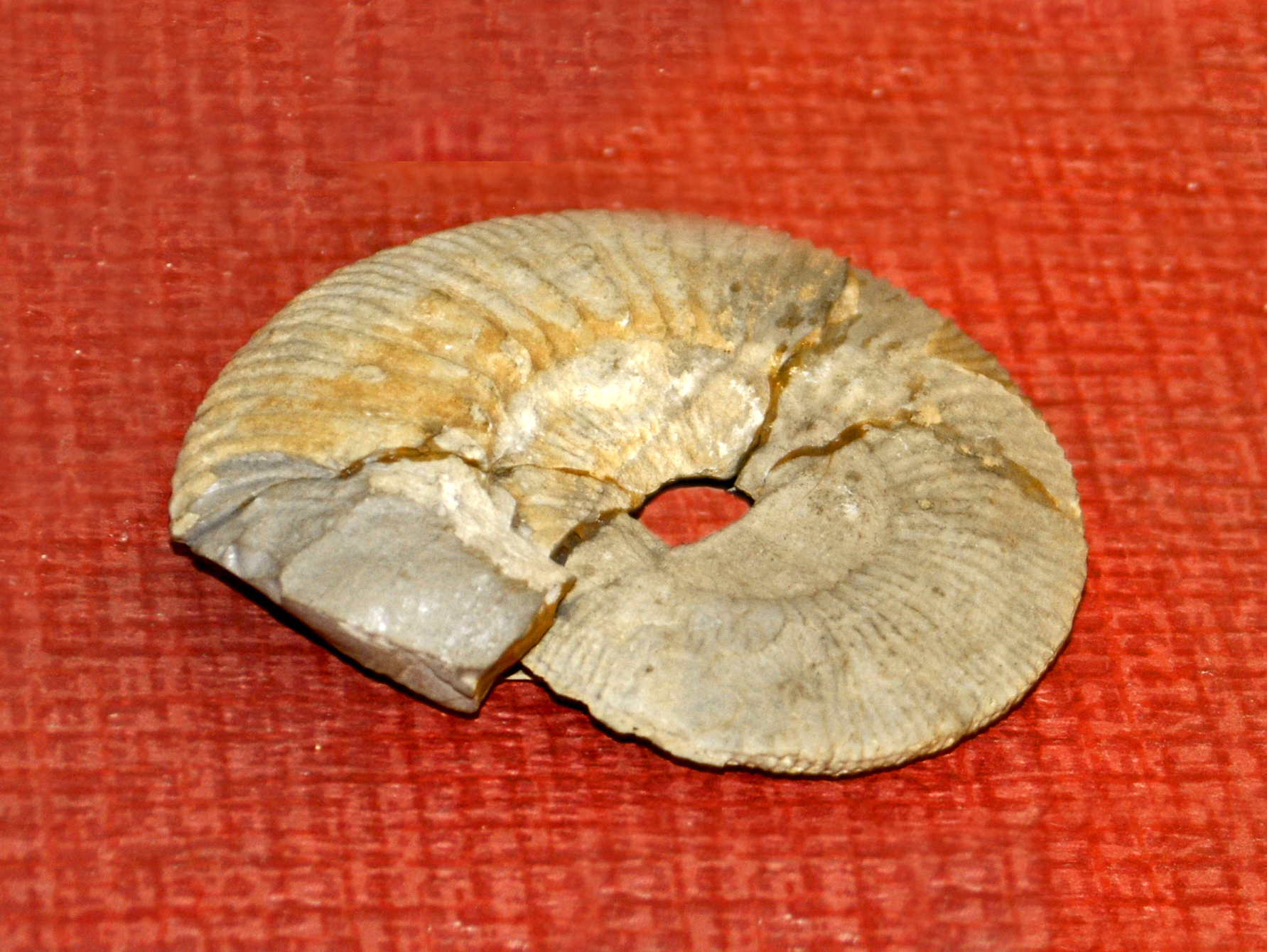
- Fossil shell of Berriasella jabronensis from Gard (France), on display at Galerie de paléontologie et d'anatomie comparée in Paris

Scientific classification
- Kingdom: Animalia
- Phylum: Mollusca
- Class: Cephalopoda
- Subclass: †Ammonoidea
- Order: †Ammonitida
- Family: †Neocomitidae
- Subfamily: †Berriasellinae; Spath, 1922

Genera
- See text

Synonyms
- Berriasellidae

= Berriasellinae =

Berriasellinae Temporal range: Tithonian–Berriasian

Extinct subfamily of ammonites

Berriasellinae is a subfamily of very late Jurassic and very early Cretaceous perisphinctoid ammonites in the family Neocomitidae. Berriasellinae comprises generally compressed, evolute genera, typically with furcated ribbing, and in some a smooth ventral band or groove. Berriasellinae are derived from the Ataxioceratidae and gave rise to the other Neocomitidae. The short lived Himalayitidae from the uppermost Jurassic have a similar appearance but differ in being generally broader and having sharper ribbing.

In current classifications (e.g. Donovan et al. 1981) berriasellid perisphinctaceans are included in the Neocomitidae as a subfamily, the Berriasellinae. In older classification such as the Treatise on Invertebrate Paleontology, part L (1957), neocomitid genera are included in the Berriasellidae, sensu lato, as the Neocomitinae.

Berriasellinae includes the genera Andiceras, Berriasella, Blanfordiceras, Delphinella, Elenaella, Jabronella, Parandiceras, Raimondiceras, Subalpinites, Substeueroceras, and Tirnovella.
