= Calpionella =

Calpionella Temporal range: Late Jurassic-Early Cretaceous ~145.5–136 Ma

Scientific classification
- Domain: Eukaryota
- (unranked): SAR
- (unranked): Alveolata
- Family: Calpionellidae
- Genus: Calpionella Lorenz, 1902

Species
- Calpionella alpina Lorenz, 1902; Calpionella elliptica Cadisch, 1932

Genus of protists

Calpionella is an extinct genus of calpionellid, a group of single-celled eukaryotes. Their fossils are found in rocks of Upper Jurassic to Lower Cretaceous age.

== Etymology ==
The name is derived from Greek κάλπις, kálpis 'water jug'.

== Biostratigraphic significance ==
The first occurrence of the species Calpionella alpina marks the beginning of the Berriasian and thus Cretaceous.

== Distribution ==
Fossils of the genus have been found in:

Jurassic

- Guasasa Formation, Cuba
- Stramberk Formation, Czech Republic

Cretaceous

- Puke, Albania
- Argiles de Ghriss Formation, Algeria
- Steinmühl Formation, Austria
- Abenaki Formation, Nova Scotia, Canada
- Guasasa Formation, Cuba
- Lake Rożnów, Poland
- Lapos Formation, Romania
- Miravetes and Tollo Formations, Spain
