= San Cayetano Formation, Cuba =

Jurassic geologic formation of Cuba

San Cayetano Formation
- Stratigraphic range: Early Jurassic-Oxfordian
- Type: Formation
- Underlies: Jagua & Francisco Formations
- Thickness: 1,000–3,000 m (3,300–9,800 ft)

Lithology
- Primary: Sandstone, siltstone, shale
- Other: Conglomerate, limestone

Location
- Coordinates: 22.7°N 83.8°W
- Region: Pinar del Río Province
- Country: Cuba
- Extent: Sierra de los Órganos

Type section
- Named for: San Cayetano, Viñales
- San Cayetano Formation, Cuba (Cuba)

The San Cayetano Formation is a geologic formation in western Cuba. It preserves fossils of mainly ammonites dating back to the Jurassic period.

== See also ==
- List of fossiliferous stratigraphic units in Cuba
