= Algarve Basin =

Sedimentary basin in Portugal

- Coordinates: 36.8°N 8.0°W
- Etymology: Algarve
- Region: Algarve
- Country: Portugal

Characteristics
- On/Offshore: Onshore/offshore

Geology
- Basin type: Extensional
- Age: Mesozoic

The Algarve Basin is a Mesozoic sedimentary basin located in southernmost Portugal, extending southwards offshore. It was formed during the Late Triassic by rifting associated with the first stage of the break-up of the Pangaea supercontinent. The basin fill consists of two main sequences that represent the two main phases of rifting: Later Triassic to Early Jurassic and Middle Jurassic to Cenomanian. The basin was inverted during the Alpine orogeny in the Cenozoic.
