= Dvuyakornaya Formation =

Dvuyakornaya Formation is a geological formation from the Cretaceous period in Crimea, south of Yalta. Remains found there include: ammonites, such as Berriasella, and brachiopods.
