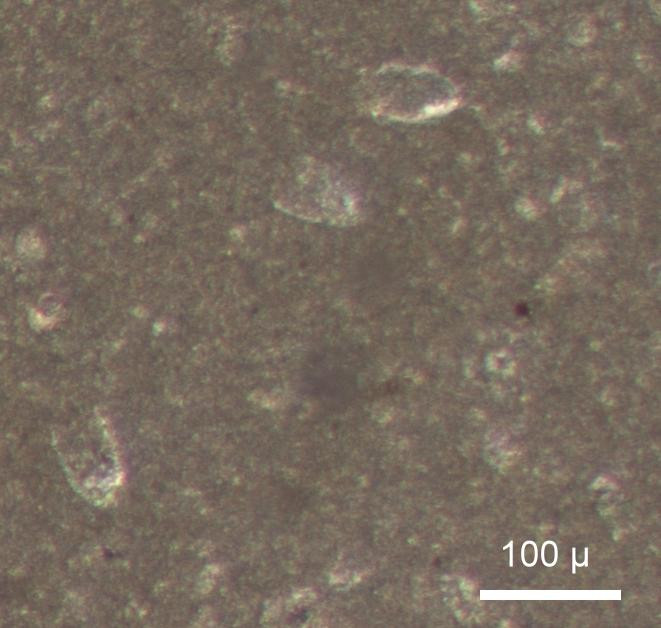
- Calpionellids seen in cross section

Scientific classification
- Domain: Eukaryota
- Kingdom: incertae sedis
- Order: †Calpionellida; Bonet, 1956

Families
- Calpionellidae Bonet, 1956; Chitinoidellidae Trejo,1975; Semichitinoidellidae Nowak, 1978

= Calpionellid =

Calpionellid Temporal range: Upper Jurassic to Lower Cretaceous Tithonian–Valanginian

Group of fossil protozoa

Calpionellids are an extinct group of eukaryotic single celled organisms of uncertain affinities. Their fossils are found in marine rocks of Upper Jurassic to Lower Cretaceous age. They were planktonic organisms with urn-shaped, calcitic tests that had a widespread distribution across the Tethys Ocean from the late Tithonian to the early Valanginian and were characterised by rapid evolution, and their abundant remains in deep sea sediments from this interval are important as they allow long distance biostratigraphic correlation and precise dating. Calpionellids were not confined to the Tethys, as they have also been found in the Vaca Muerta of northern Patagonia, in what was then the southeastern Pacific. Calpionellids are divided into two main families, the Chitinoidellidae, which are the earliest members of the group, appearing in the mid Tithonian, characterised by microgranular lorica. Calpionellidae appear later, including widespread genera such as Calpionella and Calpionellites, and have combined microgranular and hyaline lorica. A third family, the Semichitinoidellidae are sometimes recognised.

== Naming ==
The name is derived from the Greek "κάλπις", meaning "water jug".
