= Steinmühl Formation =

Geologic formation

- Stratigraphic range: Cretaceous
- Type: Formation

Location
- Country: Austria

The Steinmühl Formation is a geologic formation in Austria. It preserves fossils dated to the Cretaceous period.

== See also ==
- List of fossiliferous stratigraphic units in Austria
