= Guasasa Formation =

Geologic formation in Cuba

- Stratigraphic range: Late Jurassic–Early Cretaceous (Tithonian–early Valanginian), ~151–141 Ma
- Type: Formation
- Sub-units: San Vicente, El Americano, Tumbadero & Tumbitas Members
- Overlies: Jagua Formation

Lithology
- Primary: Limestone
- Other: Shale, dolomite, chert

Location
- Coordinates: 22.7°N 83.8°W
- Approximate paleocoordinates: 5.9°N 53.0°W
- Region: Pinar del Río Province
- Country: Cuba
- Extent: Sierra de los Órganos

Type section
- Named for: Guasasa
- Guasasa Formation (Cuba)

The Guasasa Formation is a geologic formation in Cuba dating to the Late Jurassic to Early Cretaceous (Tithonian to early Valanginian ages). It is primarily composed of limestone. Fossils from the formation include ammonites and a partially articulated skeleton of an unnamed possible ophthalmosaurid.

== See also ==
- List of fossiliferous stratigraphic units in Cuba
