= Berriasian =

First age of the early Cretaceous

- 143.1 ± 0.6 – 137.05 ± 0.2 Ma
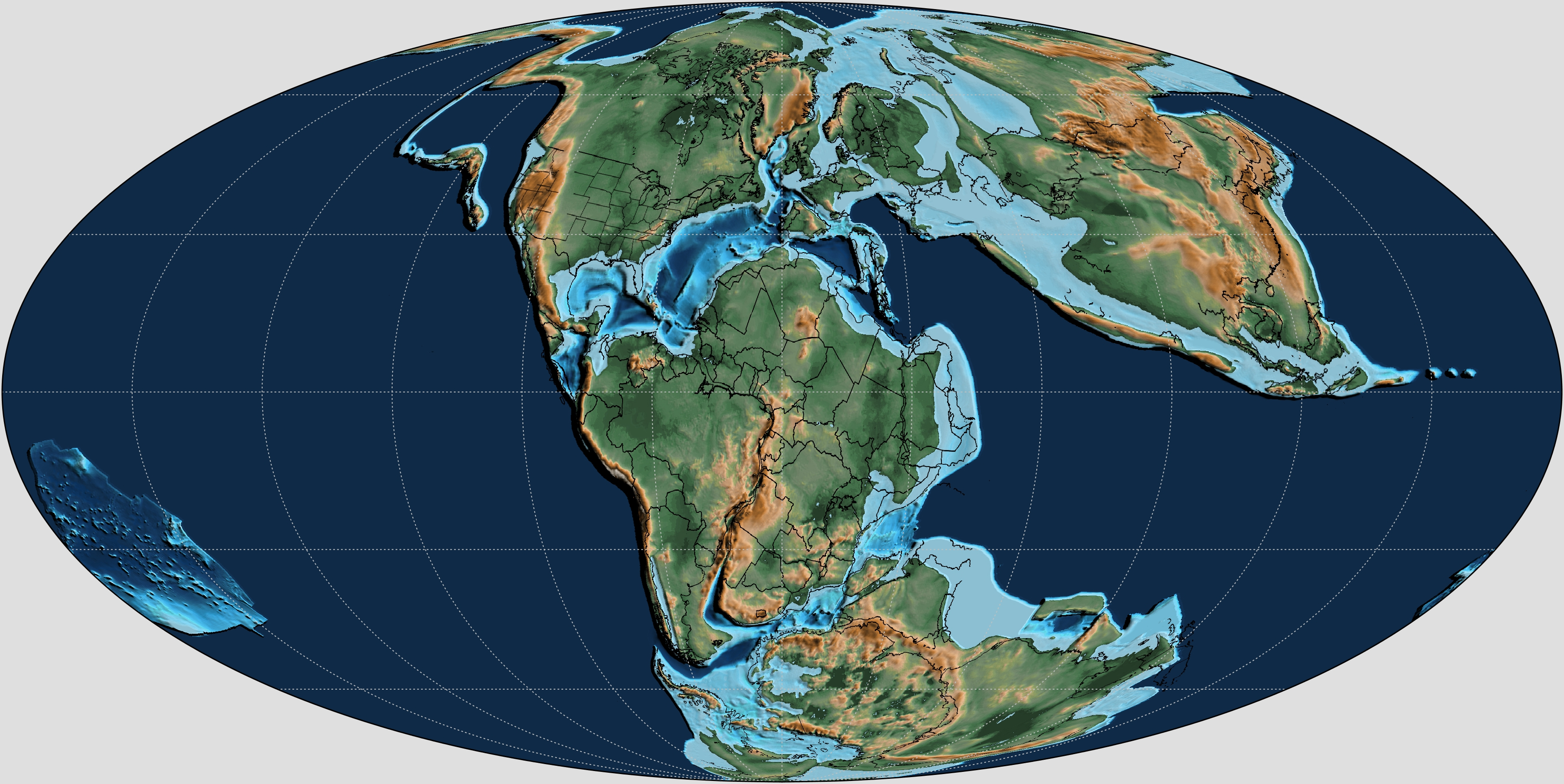
- Mollweide map of Earth 140 million years ago, with black outlines depicting countries in their locations

Chronology
← / K-Pg mass extinction
Subdivision of the Cretaceous according to the ICS, as of 2024. Vertical axis scale: Millions of years ago

Etymology
- Name formality: Formal

Usage information
- Celestial body: Earth
- Regional usage: Global (ICS)
- Time scale(s) used: ICS Time Scale

Definition
- Chronological unit: Age
- Stratigraphic unit: Stage
- Time span formality: Formal
- Lower boundary definition: Undefined
- Lower boundary definition candidates: Magnetic—base of Chron M18r; Base of Calpionellid zone B; FAD of Ammonite Berriasella jacobi
- Upper boundary definition: FAD of Thurmanniceras pertransiens (Ammonite)
- Upper boundary GSSP: Montbrun-les-Bains, Drôme, France; 44.2031°N 5.4175°E
- Upper GSSP ratified: December 2024: Montbrun-les-Bains, Drôme, France; Cañada Luenga, Betic Cordillera, Spain

In the geological timescale, the Berriasian is an age or stage of the Early Cretaceous. It is the oldest subdivision in the entire Cretaceous. It has been estimated to span the time between 143.1 ± 0.6 and 137.05 ± 0.2 Ma (million years ago). The Berriasian succeeds the Tithonian (part of the Jurassic) and precedes the Valanginian.

== Stratigraphic definition ==
The Berriasian Stage was introduced in scientific literature by Henri Coquand in 1869. It is named after the village of Berrias in the Ardèche department of France. The largely non-marine English Purbeck Formation is in part of Berriasian age. The first rocks to be described of this age were the beds of the English Purbeck Formation, named as the Purbeckian by Alexandre Brongniart in 1829 following description by Henry De la Beche, William Buckland, Thomas Webster and William Henry Fitton.

The base of the Berriasian, which is also the base of the Cretaceous System, has traditionally been placed at the first appearance of fossils of the ammonite species Berriasella jacobi. But this is a species that has a stratigraphically problematic and geographically limited distribution. A global reference profile (a GSSP) for the Berriasian has been under active consideration by the Berriasian Working Group (ISCS) of IUGS since 2010. A range of contender GSSP localities has been studied in detail by the Working Group including localities as far apart as Mexico, Ukraine, Tunisia, Iraq and the Russian Far East. Several markers have been employed to refine correlations and to work towards defining a base for the Berriasian Stage. These include calcareous microfossils, such as Nannoconus, calpionellids, ammonites, palynological data and magnetostratigraphy, notably magnetozone M19n. The calibration of these markers, especially Nannoconus steinmannii minor, N. kamptneri minor, and Calpionella alpina, within precisely fixed magnetozones give greater precision in trying to identify the best position for a boundary. In 2016, the Berriasian Working Group voted to adopt Calpionella alpina as the primary marker for the base of the Berriasian Stage. In 2019, a GSSP for the Berriasian was nominated by a vote of the Berriasian Working Group of the Cretaceous Subcommission (ISCS): it is the profile of Tré Maroua in the Vocontian Basin (Hautes Alpes, France). The GSSP was defined at the base of the Alpina Subzone in the middle of magnetozone M19n.2n. This site proposal, of Tré Maroua, was subsequently unsuccessful in a vote of the ISCS (8 votes for and 8 against: 4 not voting); a new working group was formed in 2021.

In the western part of the ocean of Tethys, the Berriasian consists of four ammonite biozones, from top to bottom (latest to earliest):

- Thurmanniceras otopeta
- Subthurmannia boissieri
- Tirnovella occitanica
- Berriasella jacobi/Pseudosubplanites grandis

The top of the Berriasian stage is defined by the base of the Valanginian, which is fixed at the first appearance of ammonite species Thurmanniceras pertransiens.

Regional terms used in Russia include "Volgian"(which spans perhaps the latest Kimmeridgian, all the Tithonian and an uncertain amount of the lower Berriasian) and the "Ryazanian" (?upper Berriasian) .

== Climate ==
The transition period from the Tithonian (Late Jurassic) to the Berriasian (145-140 Ma) was a time of cooling and restrictions in atmospheric circulation. This led to the aridization of the climate. This change in the climate likely had a variety of effects such as the weakening of monsoonal upwellings, seafloor ventilation and the circulation of nutrients within the water column. There is also evidence for seafloor hypoxia and the accumulation of micronutrients. Like the rest of the Early Cretaceous period, the Berriasian age was a time of significant shifts in the climate, variations in sea levels and volcanic activity.

=== Slivnitsa carbonate platform ===
Climate shifts during this age led to the creation of large deposits of carbonate in the western Tethys sea (Neotethys). One of them was the Slivnitsa carbonate platform which existed on the northern Neotethya sea. It was rimmed by reefs and created oligotrophic conditions where nutrient levels were low. During the boundary between the Berriasian and Valanginian ages, the production of carbonate switched from photozoan to heterozoan mode which indicates a biological crisis. A fall in sea levels during the early Valanginian age caused the platform to be exposed to air causing a shutdown in carbonate production. Then during the late Valanginian, rising sea levels would submerge the platform again restarting carbonate production in the early Hauterivian age with period unknown sources of siliciclastics, and calciclastics.

== Index fossils ==
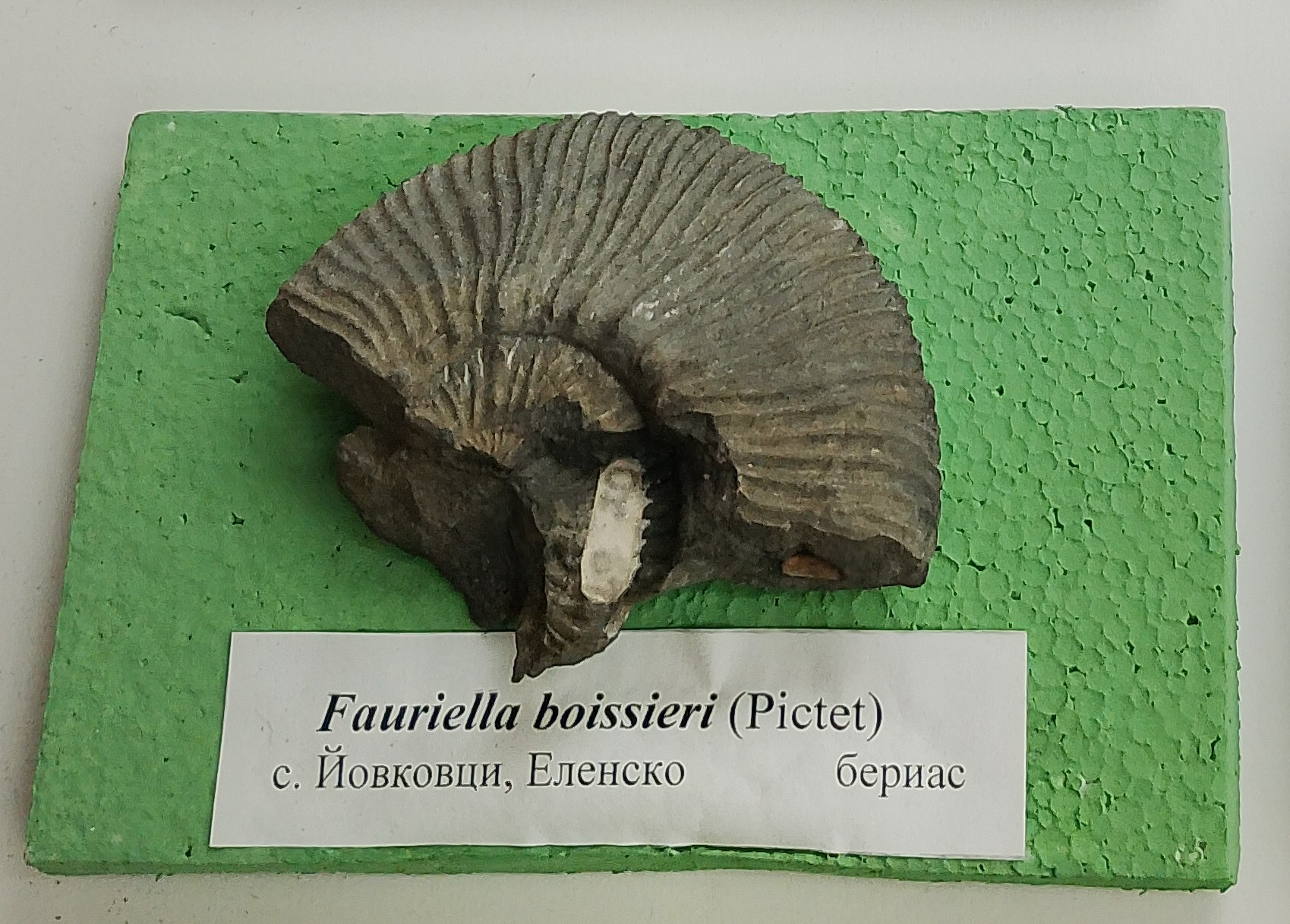
Fauriella boissieri fossil, Sofia University Museum of Paleontology and Historical Geology

The ammonite species Fauriella boissieri is an index fossil for the Berriasian upper zone.
