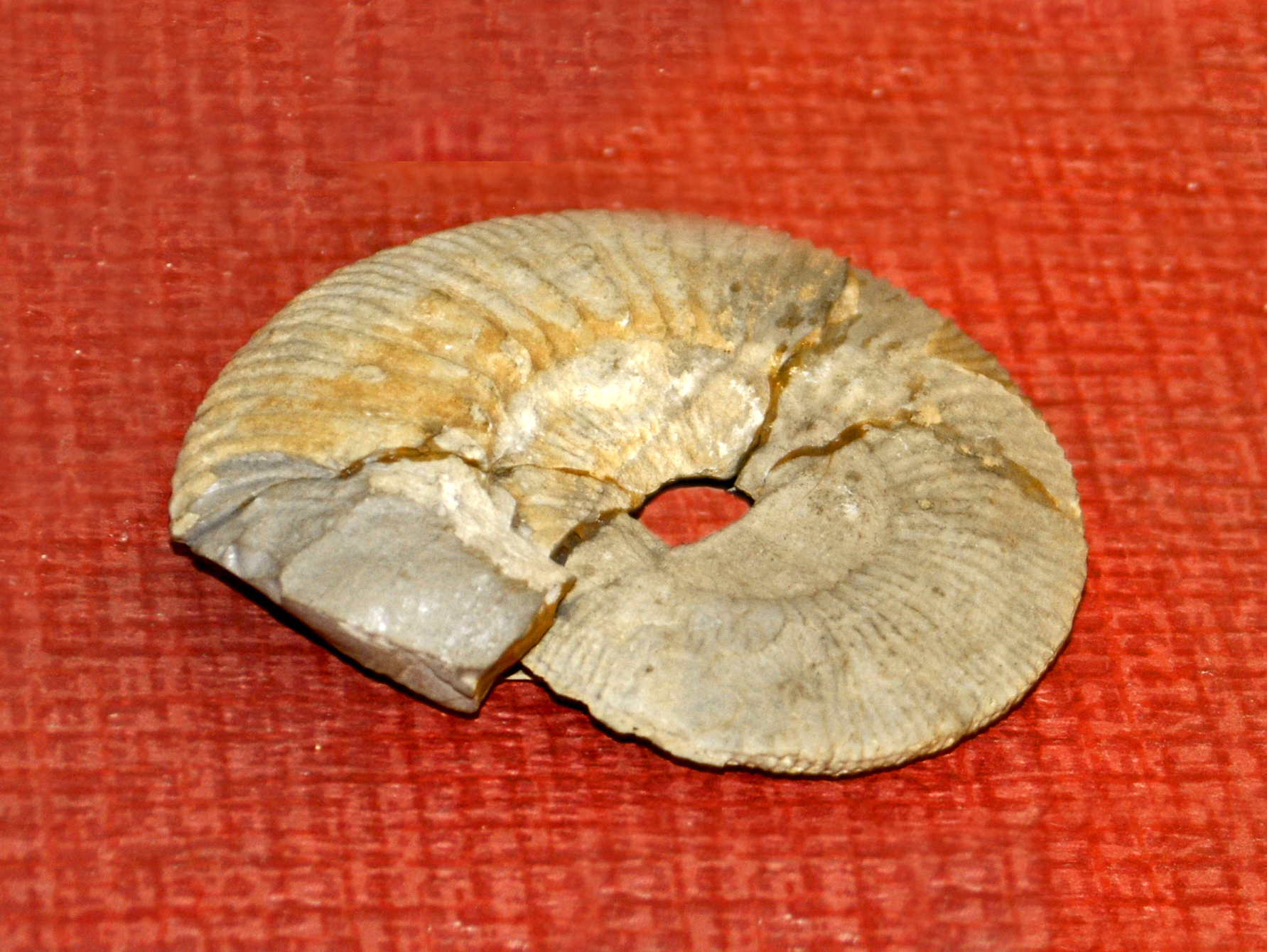
- Fossil shell of Berriasella jabronensis from Gard (France), on display at Galerie de paléontologie et d'anatomie comparée in Paris

Scientific classification
- Kingdom: Animalia
- Phylum: Mollusca
- Class: Cephalopoda
- Subclass: †Ammonoidea
- Order: †Ammonitida
- Superfamily: †Perisphinctoidea
- Family: †Neocomitidae

= Neocomitidae =

Extinct family of molluscs

Neocomitidae is a family of Lower Cretaceous ammonitids comprising genera with strongly ribbed evolute (all whorls exposed) to smooth, fairly involute (inner whorls mostly hidden) shells.

In the 1957 description of the family Neocomitidae was regarded as the subfamily Neocomitinae within the Berriasellidae, a family within the Perisphinctoidea that ranged from the Late Jurassic into the Early Cretaceous. In a more recent treatment berriaselids are regarded as a subfamily within the Neocomitidae.

Current opinion differs from the 1967 placement of Neocomitidae in the Perisphinctoidea but rather includes it in the superfamily Endemoceratoidea.

== Genera ==
- Acanthodiscus Uhlig, 1905
- Argentiniceras Spath, 1924
- Berriasella Uhlig, 1905
- Decliveites Aguirre-Urreta and Rawson, 2010
- Delphinella Le Hegarat, 1973
- Delphinites Sayn, 1901
- Distoloceras Hyatt, 1900
- Elenaella Nikolov, 1966
- Eleniceras Breskovski, 1967
- Ellenaela Nikolov, 1966
- Favrella Douvillé, 1909
- Frenguelliceras Leanza, 1945
- Hatchericeras Stanton, 1901
- Jabronella Nikolov, 1966
- Karakaschiceras Thieuloy, 1971
- Kilianella Uhlig, 1905
- Lemencia Donze and Enay 1961
- Leopoldia Mayer-Eymar, 1887
- Luppovella Nikolov, 1966
- Lyticoceras Hyatt, 1900
- Neocomites Uhlig, 1905
- Neohoploceras Spath, 1939
- Paquiericeras Sayn, 1901
- Parandiceras Spath, 1939
- Pseudoneocomites Hoedemaeker, 1982
- Pseudosubplanites Le Hegarat, 1973
- Sarasinella Uhlig, 1905
- Subalpinites Mazenot, 1939
- Substeueroceras Spath, 1922
- Thurmanniceras Cossmann, 1901
- Tirnovella Nikolov, 1966
