= Late Jurassic =

Third epoch of the Jurassic Period

Late/Upper Jurassic
- 161.5 ± 1.0 – 143.1 ± 0.6 Ma
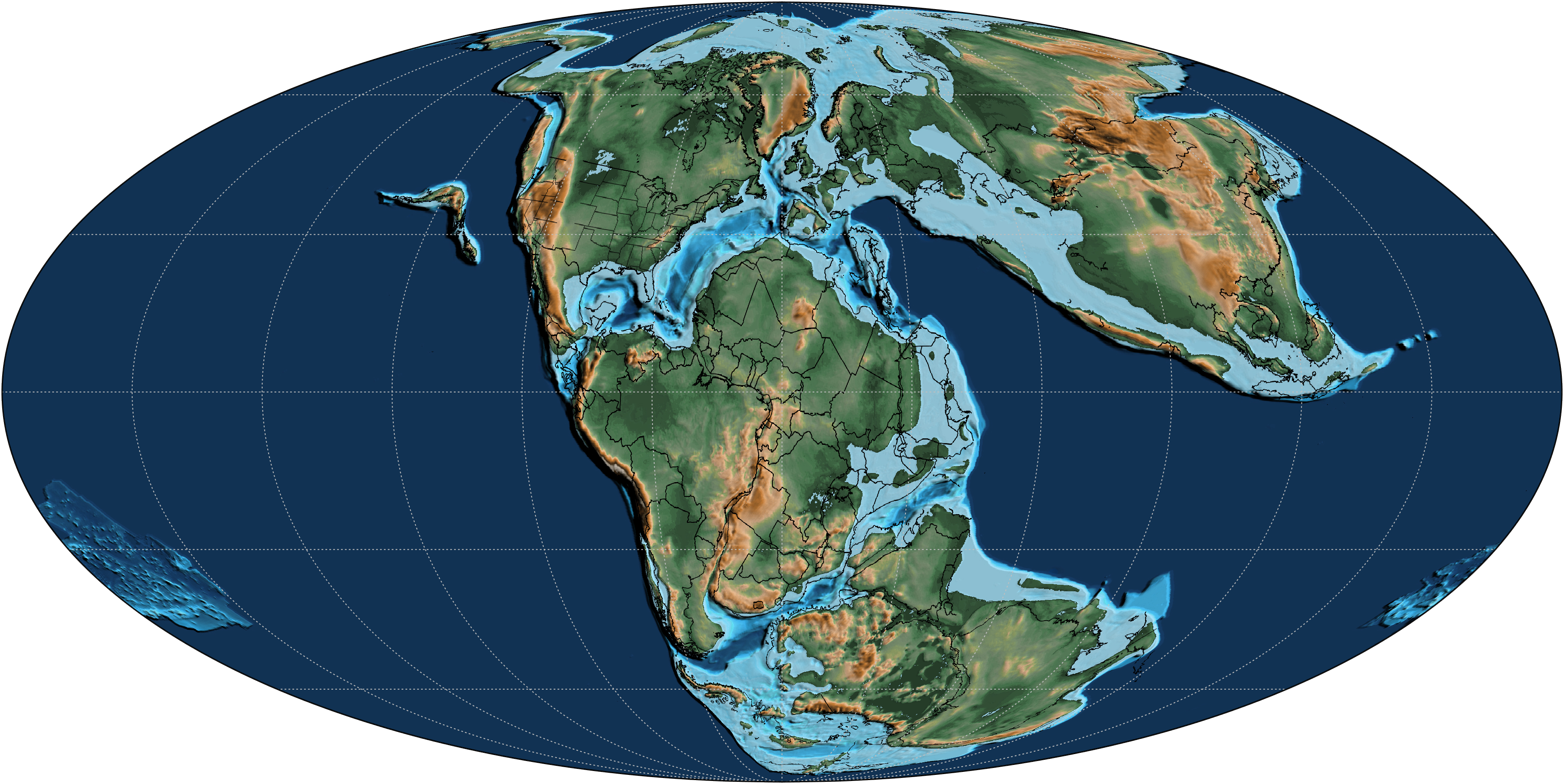
- A map of Earth as it appeared 155 million years ago during the Late Jurassic Epoch, Oxfordian Age

Chronology
← / Triassic–Jurassic extinction event
Subdivision of the Jurassic according to the ICS, as of 2024. Vertical axis scale: Millions of years ago

Etymology
- Chronostratigraphic name: Upper Jurassic
- Geochronological name: Late Jurassic
- Name formality: Formal

Usage information
- Celestial body: Earth
- Regional usage: Global (ICS)
- Time scale(s) used: ICS Time Scale

Definition
- Chronological unit: Epoch
- Stratigraphic unit: Series
- Time span formality: Formal
- Lower boundary definition: Not formally defined
- Lower boundary definition candidates: Horizon of the Ammonite Cardioceras redcliffense.
- Lower boundary GSSP candidate section(s): Redcliff Point, Dorset, UK; Savouron, Provence, France
- Upper boundary definition: Not formally defined
- Upper boundary definition candidates: Magnetic—base of Chron M18r; Base of Calpionellid zone B; FAD of Ammonite Berriasella jacobi
- Upper boundary GSSP candidate section(s): None

The Late Jurassic is the third epoch of the Jurassic period, and it spans the geologic time from 161.5 ± 1.0 to 143.1 ± 0.6 million years ago (Ma), which is preserved in Upper Jurassic strata.

In European lithostratigraphy, the name "Malm" indicates rocks of Late Jurassic age. In the past, Malm was also used to indicate the unit of geological time, but this usage is now discouraged to make a clear distinction between lithostratigraphic and geochronologic/chronostratigraphic units.

== Subdivisions ==
The Late Jurassic is divided into three ages, which correspond with the three faunal stages of Upper Jurassic rock:

Name	Lower boundary (Ma)
Tithonian	149.2 ± 0.7
Kimmeridgian	154.8 ± 0.8
Oxfordian	161.5 ± 1.0

== Paleogeography ==
By the Late Jurassic, Pangaea had already broken apart into Laurasia (Eurasia and North America) to the north and Gondwana to the south, divided by the wide Tethys Ocean. During the Late Jurassic, narrow ocean basins formed separating Eastern Gondwana (Antarctica, Australia, India and Madagascar), Western Gondwana (Africa, Arabia and South America) and Laurasia. The young North Atlantic Ocean continues to widen as North America drifts to the north – brought increased moisture to the formerly highly arid subtropical interior of Pangaea. The Wrangellia terrane is accreted to Western North America.

== Climate ==
Deep ocean basins covered the poles, inhibiting the formation of polar ice caps. Polar summers were ice-free. The circulation of ocean currents between the high and low latitudes contributed to a generally warmer climate than today. Europe became progressively more arid over the Late Jurassic.

== Life forms ==
This epoch is well known for many famous types of dinosaurs, such as the sauropods, the theropods, the thyreophorans, and the ornithopods. Other animals, such as some crocodylomorphs and the first birds, appeared in the Jurassic. Listed here are only a few of the many Jurassic animals:

Name	Description	Where found
Allosaurus	The most common Late Jurassic theropod	North America, also present in Europe
Anurognathus	One of the smallest pterosaurs	Europe
Apatosaurus	A large herbivorous sauropod dinosaur	North America
Archaeopteryx	A bird-like maniraptoran	Europe
Barosaurus	An exceptionally long herbivorous sauropod dinosaur	North America
Brachiosaurus	A massive herbivorous sauropod dinosaur	North America
Brachytrachelopan	A small herbivorous sauropod dinosaur	South America
Brontosaurus	A large herbivorous sauropod dinosaur	North America
Camarasaurus	A large herbivorous sauropod dinosaur	North America
Camptosaurus	An ornithopod	North America and possibly Europe
Ceratosaurus	A medium-sized Jurassic carnivore	North America, Europe, and possibly Africa
Chaoyangsaurus	An early marginocephalian dinosaur	Asia
Compsognathus	A small theropod	Europe
Dakosaurus	A medium-sized sea-going crocodylomorph	Europe
Dicraeosaurus	A large herbivorous sauropod dinosaur	Africa
Diplodocus	An exceptionally long herbivorous sauropod dinosaur	North America
Dryosaurus	An ornithopod	North America
Elaphrosaurus	A medium-sized Jurassic carnivore	Africa
Epanterias	A massive carnivore (possibly just Allosaurus)	North America
Europasaurus	A small herbivorous sauropod dinosaur	Europe
Gargoyleosaurus	A thyreophoran	North America
Giraffatitan	A large sauropod (formerly recognized as a species of Brachiosaurus)	Africa
Juramaia	A basal mammal	Asia
Kentrosaurus	A thyreophoran	Africa
Liopleurodon	A medium-sized sea-going pliosaur	Europe
Maraapunisaurus	Possibly among the largest sauropod dinosaurs ever known	
Ophthalmosaurus	A very common sea-going ichthyosaur	Europe and North America
Ornitholestes	A small theropod	North America
Perisphinctes	An ammonite	
Pterodactylus	A short-tailed pterosaur	Europe
Rhamphorhynchus	A long-tailed pterosaur	Europe
Saurophaganax	A giant carnivore; possibly the largest land predator of the Jurassic (possibly a synonym of Allosaurus)	North America
Stegosaurus	A thyreophoran	North America and Europe
Supersaurus	Possibly the longest sauropod dinosaur of them all	
Torvosaurus	A large Jurassic carnivore	North America and Europe
Tuojiangosaurus	A thyreophoran	Asia
Yangchuanosaurus	A large theropod	Asia
Yinlong	An early marginocephalian dinosaur	Asia
