= Mid-Cenomanian Event =

Oceanic anoxic event during the middle Cenomanian

The Mid-Cenomanian Event (MCE) was an oceanic anoxic event that took place during the middle Cenomanian, as its name suggests, around 96.5 Ma.

== Timing ==
Approximately 400 kyr before the MCE occurred a major negative δ^{13}C excursion. Geochronological analysis of the Iona-1 core from the Eagle Ford Group of Texas shows the MCE lasted from 96.57 ± 0.12 Ma to 96.36 ± 0.12 Ma. A positive δ^{13}C excursion of a rather small magnitude (1%) defines the MCE. The MCE δ^{13}C excursion had two pulses, designated MCE Ia and MCE Ib, respectively. The magnitude of MCE Ib's δ^{13}C shift was greater than MCE Ia's.

== Causes ==
Orbital forcing is considered the chief cause of the MCE by many scientists. It is believed that the MCE occurred during the simultaneous occurrence of nodes in the obliquity, orbital eccentricity, and axial precession Milankovitch cycles. A coincidence in all three nodes would occur once every 2.45 Myr, a timeframe consistent with the occurrence of the Cenomanian-Turonian boundary event (OAE2) about 2.4 Myr after the MCE. Within the MCE, a 10,784 year anoxia cycle, governed by 80–100 yr, 200–230 yr, 350–500 yr, ~1650 yr, and 4843 yr cycles, can be detected by examining the timing of various miscellaneous biogeochemical fluctuations, revealing that a pattern of variability in solar irradiance reminiscent to that observed during the Holocene governed geobiological events of a smaller timeframe and their geological expression within the MCE.

A second hypothesis postulates volcanic activity from a large igneous province (LIP) as the MCE's main cause. Various LIPs have been held responsible for initiating the MCE, including the High Arctic Large Igneous Province (HALIP), the Caribbean Large Igneous Province (CLIP), the Madagascar Large Igneous Province, and the Ontong-Java Plateau. Both overall concentrations of mercury and ratios of mercury to total organic carbon increased during the MCE interval, suggesting volcanism played a major role in the development of MCE anoxia. The absence of unradiogenic osmium enrichments during the MCE interval has been invoked as evidence against a volcanic cause, on the other hand.

== Effects ==
The carbon cycle perturbation associated with the MCE was not intense enough to cause a major extinction event, as was the case with the much more severe disturbance that led to OAE2. Nevertheless, many marine creatures underwent noticeable declines and turnovers, particularly calcitic benthos.

A change in ammonoid composition and abundance has been observed across the MCE. Up until MCE Ia, planispiral ammonoids, in particular the genus Schloenbachia, dominated the waters of the Vocontian Basin. During and after MCE Ib, heteromorph ammonoids, especially Sciponoceras, predominated.

A pronounced turnover among calcareous nannofossils ensued in equatorial waters over the MCE's duration. Prior to the MCE, the nannofossil Biscutum constans was very abundant thanks to high nutrient availability in the upper parts of the photic zone. During the MCE, Rhagodiscus asper decreased in relative abundance. After the MCE, taxa that preferred less eutrophic surficial waters, such as Eprolithus floralis, became more abundant.

Foraminiferal abundance was tied to the 100 kyr eccentricity cycle. During the middle to upper parts of this cycle, planktic foraminifera increased in abundance. Blooms of Gavelinella reussi and G. berthelini were typical of the upper parts of the cycle. The common occurrence of plano-convex Rotalipora characterised the eccentricity cycle's lows. The long eccentricity cycle governed the influx of Boreal Ocean foraminifera into the much warmer Tethys Ocean.

== See also ==
- Selli Event
- Paquier Event
- Amadeus Event
- Breistroffer Event
