= Faraoni Thermal Excursion =

Hyperthermal event during the Early Cretaceous

The Faraoni Thermal Excursion (FTX) was a hyperthermal event that occurred during the Hauterivian stage of the Early Cretaceous period, being induced by flood basalt volcanism. It is associated with an oceanic anoxic event (OAE).

== Causes ==
The FTX is associated with a pulse of large igneous province (LIP) activity indicated by increased environmental mercury loading, suggesting that massive volcanism was its cause like other Cretaceous OAEs. The OAE was exacerbated by enhanced recycling of sedimentary phosphorus back into the water column under anoxic conditions, which acted as a positive feedback loop that facilitated more eutrophication and deoxygenation.

== Timing and duration ==
The FTX occurred around 131 Ma. The burst of LIP volcanism that kickstarted the FTX occurred about 375 kyr before the deposition of organic-rich layers associated with oceanic deoxygenation.

== Anoxia ==
The FTX caused an anoxic event, which was initially believed to be limited to the Tethys Ocean but has since been found to have affected other marine regions. In some studied sections, there was only dysoxia and not outright anoxia.

== Biotic effects ==
Planktonic foraminifera with elongated chambers radiated during the FTX, with their radiation driven not just by increased incidence of anoxia in the upper water column but also by increased productivity, seasonality, and stratification.

== See also ==
- Weissert Event
- Selli Event
- Paquier Event
- Amadeus Event
- Breistroffer Event
- Bonarelli Event
