= Amadeus Event =

Oceanic anoxic event

The Amadeus Event (OAE1c) was an oceanic anoxic event (OAE). It occurred 106 million years ago (Ma), during the Albian age of the Cretaceous period, in a climatic interval known as the Middle Cretaceous Hothouse (MKH).

== Extent and duration ==
OAE1c lasted for approximately 567 kyr. Environmental conditions across much of the globe facilitated the formation of dysaerobic waters, although OAE1c varied in its nature and magnitude depending on region. Shallow shelf environments in the Gulf of Mexico were unaffected by anoxia.

== Causes ==
The MKH was one of the hottest intervals of the entire Phanerozoic eon, with OAE1c occurring during a particularly warm time known as the Amadeus Thermal Maximum; these conditions were prime for generating anoxic waters. Orbital forcing is considered the most likely cause of OAE1c, as most geochemical changes observed across the OAE1c interval were in lockstep with Milankovitch cycles. Black shale deposition occurs during minima in the axial precession cycle, when waters were less saline and/or warmer. Increased influxes of terrestrial runoff would have induced stratification of the water column, inhibiting mixing of water masses at different depths. Peaks in carbonate deposition occurred during precession maxima, when precipitation and evaporation rates were lower and saline deep water bodies were able to form, preventing stratification. The lack of anomalous osmium enrichments of any significance rules out large igneous province volcanism as a suspected causal factor, which is known to have caused other Cretaceous OAEs like OAE1a and OAE2.

== Effects ==
Unlike many other OAEs across the MKH, the black shales deposited during OAE1c were made up of type III kerogen and consisted primarily of terrestrial organic matter, in contrast to the type II kerogen made up of marine organic matter that the black shales of OAE1a, OAE1b, OAE1d, and OAE2 were composed of. Also unlike other MKH OAEs, no significant radiations or extinctions of radiolarians occurred as a result of OAE1c.

== See also ==
- Jenkyns Event
- Selli Event
- Paquier Event
- Breistroffer Event
- Bonarelli Event
