= Hugh Jenkyns =

British geologist (born 1945)

- Born: February 16, 1945 (age 81)
- Education: University of Southampton University of Leicester
- Known for: Studies of Oceanic Anoxic Events
- Awards: Lyell Medal (2025)
- Scientific career
- Fields: Stratigraphy Palaeoceanography

Hugh Crawford Jenkyns (born 16 February 1945) is a British geologist and Emeritus Professor at the Department of Earth Sciences, University of Oxford, whose research has focused on major environmental change in the Mesozoic Era. He served as Vice-Principal of St Edmund Hall from 2009 to 2013.

== Education ==
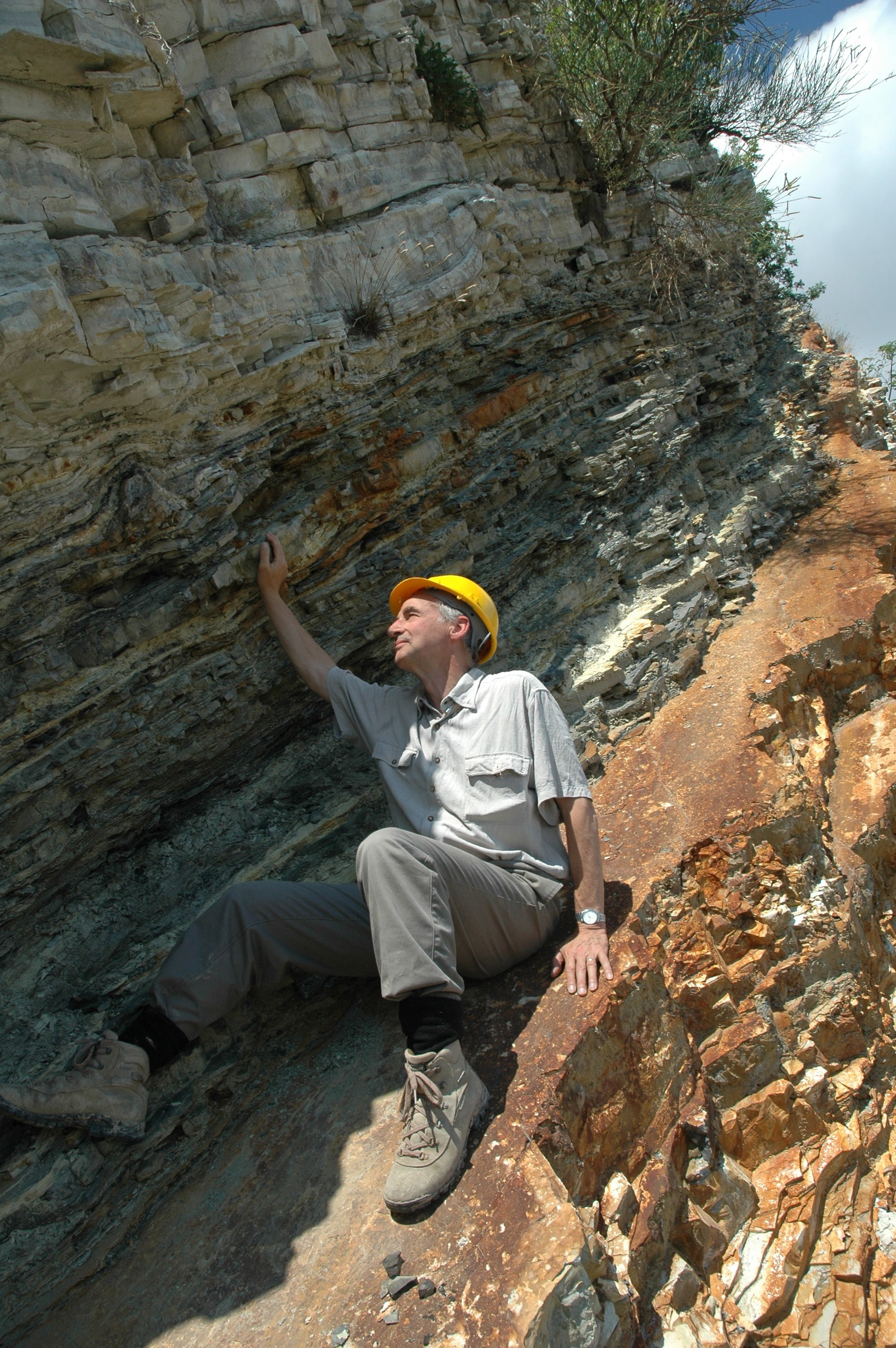
Hugh Jenkyns and the Bonarelli Level, Furlo, Italy, the local lithological expression of an oceanic anoxic event

Jenkyns attended the University of Southampton as an undergraduate and completed his PhD at the University of Leicester in 1970

== Institutions ==
- University of Cambridge
- University of Durham
- University of Oxford
- St Edmund Hall

== Academic career ==
Jenkyns began his academic career with a study on the sedimentology of Jurassic limestones in western Sicily before expanding his field of interest to cover much of the Alpine-mediterranean region. Following post-doctoral studies in Basel, Switzerland and Oxford, his early involvement in the Deep Sea Drilling Project in the 1970s, between moving from Cambridge to Durham, led to the concept of the so-called ‘oceanic anoxic event’, an environmental phenomenon characterized by the global spread of oxygen-depleted waters in the World Ocean and the accompanying deposition of black organic-rich shale (Schlanger, S.O., and Jenkyns, H.C. 1976. Cretaceous oceanic anoxic events: causes and consequences. Geologie en Mijnbouw, 55, 179–184). Subsequent detailed work involving novel isotope systems and organic geochemistry has helped to decipher the geochemical and biological impacts of such events (Jenkyns, H.C. 2010. Geochemistry of oceanic anoxic events. Geochemistry, Geophysics, Geosystems, 11, Q03004). The key Mesozoic intervals investigated are the Toarcian Oceanic Anoxic Event or T-OAE, the early Aptian or Selli Event (OAE 1a) and the Cenomanian-Turonian boundary event (OAE 2).

== Awards and honours ==
- 2027 Jean Baptiste Lamarck Medal, European Geosciences Union
- 2025 Lyell Medal from the Geological Society of London
- 2018 Elected Member of the Academia Europaea
- 2018 Elected Foreign Member of the Accademia dei Lincei
- 2015 Elected Foreign Member of the Istituto Lombardo Accademia di Scienze e Lettere
- 2012 Capellini Medal from the Geological Society of Italy
- 2010 Laurence Sloss Award from the Geological Society of America
- 2009 Medal from University of Ferrara, Italy
- 2009 Pettijohn Medal from the Society for Sedimentary Geology (SEPM)
- 2008 Geological Society of America Distinguished Service Award
- 2008 Elected Geological Society of America Fellow
- 1992 Major Edward d'Ewes Fitzgerald Coke Medal from the Geological Society of London
- 1982 Wollaston Fund from the Geological Society of London
