= Finite element exterior calculus =

Finite element exterior calculus (FEEC) is a mathematical framework that formulates finite element methods using chain complexes. Its main application has been a comprehensive theory for finite element methods in computational electromagnetism, computational solid and fluid mechanics. FEEC was developed in the early 2000s by Douglas N. Arnold, Richard S. Falk and Ragnar Winther, among others. Finite element exterior calculus is sometimes called as an example of a compatible discretization technique, and bears similarities with discrete exterior calculus, although they are distinct theories.

One starts with the recognition that the used differential operators are often part of complexes: successive application results in zero. Then, the phrasing of the differential operators of relevant differential equations and relevant boundary conditions as a Hodge Laplacian. The Hodge Laplacian terms are split using the Hodge decomposition. A related variational saddle-point formulation for mixed quantities is then generated. Discretization to a mesh-related subcomplex is done requiring a collection of projection operators which commute with the differential operators. One can then prove uniqueness and optimal convergence as function of mesh density.

FEEC is of immediate relevancy for diffusion, elasticity, electromagnetism, Stokes flow.

For the important de Rham complex, pertaining to the grad, curl and div operators, suitable family of elements have been generated not only for tetrahedrons, but also for other shaped elements such as bricks. Moreover, also conforming with them, prism and pyramid shaped elements have been generated. For the latter, uniquely, the shape functions are not polynomial. The quantities are 0-forms (scalars), 1-forms (gradients), 2-forms (fluxes), and 3-forms (densities). Diffusion, electromagnetism, and elasticity, Stokes flow, general relativity, and actually all known complexes, can all be phrased in terms of the de Rham complex. For Navier-Stokes, there may be possibilities too.
