= Paquier Event =

Anoxic event during the Middle Cretaceous

The Paquier Event (OAE1b) was an oceanic anoxic event (OAE) that occurred around 111 million years ago (Ma), in the Albian geologic stage, during a climatic interval of Earth's history known as the Middle Cretaceous Hothouse (MKH).

== Timeline ==
OAE1b had three main subevents: the Kilian, Paquier, and Leenhardt. The Kilian subevent was defined by a negative δ^{13}C excursion from about 2-2.5% to 0.5-1.5% followed by a gradual δ^{13}C rise in the Atlantic Ocean, though the magnitude of these carbon isotope fluctuations was higher in areas like the Basque-Cantabrian Basin. The Paquier subevent was the most extreme subevent of OAE1b, exhibiting a δ^{13}C drop of ~3% in marine organic matter and of 1.5-2% in marine carbonate, which was succeeded by a gradual positive δ^{13}C excursion. The Leenhardt subevent was the last OAE1b subevent and is associated in the eastern Tethys Ocean with a negative δ^{13}C excursion of 0.09‰ to -0.48‰ followed by a positive δ^{13}C excursion to 0.58%, although the magnitude of the carbon isotope shifts varies considerably in other marine regions, the negative δ^{13}C excursion being around 1% in the Atlantic and western Tethys but ~4% in the Basque-Cantabrian Basin and ~3% in the Andean Basin.

== Causes ==
Pulsed volcanic activity of the Kerguelen Plateau is suggested to be the cause of OAE1b based on mercury anomalies recorded from this interval. Five different mercury anomalies relative to total organic carbon are known from strata from the Jiuquan Basin spanning the OAE1b interval, strongly supporting a causal relationship with massive volcanism. Prominent negative osmium isotope excursions coeval with biotic changes among planktonic foraminifera further confirm the occurrence of multiple episodes of submarine volcanic activity over the course of OAE1b. Nonetheless, volcanism is not unequivocally supported as OAE1b's mainspring. Mercury anomalies associated with OAE1b have been interpreted by some to reflect mineralisation associated with salt diapirism instead of volcanism. Another line of evidence contradicting the volcanism hypothesis involves the massive diachrony between thallium isotope records and intervals of deoxygenation.

Global warming intensified chemical weathering, leading to increased terrestrial inputs of organic matter into oceans and lakes. This promoted eutrophication that rapidly depleted bodies of water of dissolved oxygen. A contemporary increase in ^{187}Os/^{188}Os reflects an increase in continentally derived, radiogenic osmium sources in the ocean, confirming an increase in terrestrial runoff.

Alternatively, rather than volcanism, some research points to orbital cycles as the governing cause of OAE1b. It has been hypothesised that enhanced monsoonal activity modulated by Earth's axial precession drove the development of OAE1b. Evidence supporting this explanation includes regular variations in detrital and weathering indices between humid intervals of high weathering and anoxia and drier intervals of decreased weathering and better oxygenated waters; these variations are suggested to correspond to precession cycles. A different analysis of orbital forcing purports the long eccentricity cycle as the most significant orbital driver of monsoonal modulation. δ^{18}O records in planktic foraminifera from the Boreal Ocean show a 100 kyr periodicity, indicating that the short eccentricity cycle governed the ingression of hot Tethyan waters into the Boreal Ocean and consequent Boreal warming. The 405 kyr eccentricity cycle appears to have dominated the advance and retreat of anoxia in the Vocontian Basin.

The tectonic isolation of the Atlantic and Tethys Oceans restricted their ventilation, enabling their stagnation and facilitating ideal conditions for thermohaline stratification, which would in turn promote the widespread development of anoxia during a speedily warming climate.

OAE1b's coincidence with a peak in a 5-6 Myr oscillation in marine phosphorus accumulation suggests that enhanced phosphorus regeneration may have been one of the causal factors behind the development of widespread anoxia. As more phosphorus built up in marine environments and caused spikes in biological productivity and decreases in dissolved oxygen, it caused a strong positive feedback loop in which phosphorus deposited on the seafloor was recycled back into the water column at faster rates, facilitating further increase in productivity and decrease in seawater oxygen content. Eventually, a negative feedback loop of increased atmospheric oxygen terminated this phosphorus spike and the OAE itself by causing increased wildfire activity and a consequent decline in vegetation and chemical weathering.

== Effects ==
Unlike other OAEs during the MKH, such as the OAE1a and the OAE2, OAE1b was not associated with an extinction event of benthic foraminifera. Identical benthic foraminiferal assemblages occur both below and above the black shales deposited in association with OAE1b, indicating that this OAE was limited in its geographic and bathymetric extent. Although some parts of the ocean floor became devoid of life, benthic foraminifera survived in refugia and recolonised previously abandoned areas after the OAE with no faunal turnover. Planktonic foraminifera, however, significantly declined during OAE1b. In the eastern Pacific, the Paquier Level of OAE1b is associated with the demise of heterozoan-dominated carbonate production.

As with other OAEs, OAE1b left its mark on the geologic record in the form of widespread and abundant deposition of black shales.

== See also ==
- Jenkyns Event
- Selli Event
- Breistroffer Event
- Bonarelli Event
