= Barbara Wohlmuth =

German mathematician

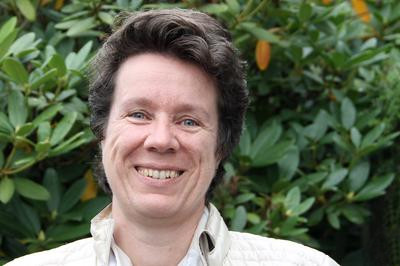
Wohlmuth at Oberwolfach, 2014

Barbara I. Wohlmuth is a German mathematician specializing in the numerical solution of partial differential equations. She holds the chair of numerical mathematics at the Technical University of Munich (TUM).

== Education and career ==
Wohlmuth earned a master's degree in mathematics in 1991 from Joseph Fourier University in France, and a diploma in 1992 from TUM. She completed a doctorate at TUM in 1995, under the supervision of Ronald Hoppe, and earned her habilitation in 2000 at the University of Augsburg.

She worked as a full professor at the University of Stuttgart from 2001 until 2010, when she returned to TUM.

== Recognition ==
In 2005, the Istituto Lombardo Accademia di Scienze e Lettere in Milan gave her their International Giovanni Sacchi Landriani Prize. She won the Gottfried Wilhelm Leibniz Prize of the Deutsche Forschungsgemeinschaft in 2012. In 2013 she was elected to the Bavarian Academy of Sciences and Humanities. In 2020 she was named a SIAM Fellow "for sustained seminal contributions to the field of numerical mathematics and for exemplary leadership and service to the computational science community". She was elected to the German National Academy of Sciences Leopoldina in 2022.

She was the Emmy Noether Lecturer of the German Mathematical Society in 2014, and an invited speaker on numerical analysis and scientific computing at the 2018 International Congress of Mathematicians.
