= Solar luminosity =

Unit of light in stars and galaxies

Evolution of the solar luminosity, radius and effective temperature compared to the present-day Sun. After Ribas (2010)

The solar luminosity (L_{☉}) is a unit of radiant flux (power emitted in the form of photons) conventionally used by astronomers to measure the luminosity of stars, galaxies and other celestial objects in terms of the output of the Sun.

One nominal solar luminosity is defined by the International Astronomical Union to be 3.828×10^{26} W. This corresponds almost exactly to a bolometric absolute magnitude of +4.74.

The Sun is a weakly variable star, and its actual luminosity therefore fluctuates. The major fluctuation is the eleven-year solar cycle (sunspot cycle) that causes a quasi-periodic variation of about ±0.1%. Other variations over the last 200–300 years are thought to be much smaller than this.

== Determination ==
Solar luminosity is related to solar irradiance (the solar constant). Slow changes in the axial tilt of the planet and the shape of its orbit cause cyclical changes to the solar irradiance. The result is orbital forcing that causes the Milankovitch cycles, which determine Earthly glacial cycles. The mean irradiance at the top of the Earth's atmosphere is sometimes known as the solar constant, I_{☉}. Irradiance is defined as power per unit area, so the solar luminosity (total power emitted by the Sun) is the irradiance received at the Earth (solar constant) multiplied by the area of the sphere whose radius is the mean distance between the Earth and the Sun:
$$L_\odot = 4\pi k I_\odot A^2$$
where A is the unit distance (the value of the astronomical unit in metres) and k is a constant (whose value is very close to one) that reflects the fact that the mean distance from the Earth to the Sun is not exactly one astronomical unit.

== See also ==
- Solar mass
- Solar radius
- Nuclear fusion
- Active region
- Triple-alpha process
