= Orbital forcing =

Effect on the Earth's climate from slow orbital changes

Orbital forcing is the effect on climate of slow changes in the tilt of the Earth's axis and shape of the Earth's orbit around the Sun (see Milankovitch cycles). These orbital changes modify the total amount of sunlight reaching the Earth by up to 25% at mid-latitudes (from 400 to 500 W/m^{2} at latitudes of 60 degrees). In this context, the term "forcing" signifies a physical process that affects the Earth's climate.

This mechanism is believed to be responsible for the timing of the ice age cycles. A strict application of the Milankovitch theory does not allow the prediction of a "sudden" ice age (sudden being anything under a century or two), since the fastest orbital period is about 20,000 years. The timing of past glacial periods coincides very well with the predictions of the Milankovitch theory, and these effects can be calculated into the future.

Milankovitch cycles are also associated with environmental change during greenhouse periods of Earth's climatic history. Changes in lacustrine sediments corresponding to the timeframes of periodic orbital cycles have been interpreted as evidence of orbital forcing on climate during greenhouse periods like the Early Paleogene. Notably, Milankovitch cycles have been theorised to be important modulators of biogeochemical cycles during oceanic anoxic events, including the Toarcian Oceanic Anoxic Event, the Mid-Cenomanian Event, and the Cenomanian-Turonian Oceanic Anoxic Event.

== Overview ==
Ice core data. Note length of glacial cycles averages ~100,000 years. Blue curve is temperature, green curve is CO_{2}, and red curve is windblown glacial dust (loess). Today's date is on the right side of the graph.

It is sometimes asserted that the length of the current interglacial temperature peak will be similar to that of the preceding interglacial peak (Sangamonian/Eem Stage). Therefore, we might be nearing the end of this warm period. However, this conclusion is probably mistaken: the lengths of previous interglacials were not particularly regular (see graphic at right). Berger and Loutre (2002) argue that “with or without human perturbations, the current warm climate may last another 50,000 years. The reason is a minimum in the eccentricity of Earth's orbit around the Sun.” Also, Archer and Ganopolski (2005) report that probable future CO_{2} emissions may be enough to suppress the glacial cycle for the next 500 kyr.

Note in the graphic, the strong 100,000 year periodicity of the cycles, and the striking asymmetry of the curves. This asymmetry is believed to result from complex interactions of feedback mechanisms. It has been observed that ice ages deepen in progressive steps. However, the recovery to interglacial conditions occurs in a single large step.

Orbital mechanics require that the length of the seasons be proportional to the swept areas of the seasonal quadrants, so when the eccentricity is extreme, the seasons on the far side of the orbit can last substantially longer. Today, when autumn and winter in the Northern Hemisphere occur at closest approach, the Earth is moving at its maximum velocity and therefore autumn and winter are slightly shorter than spring and summer.

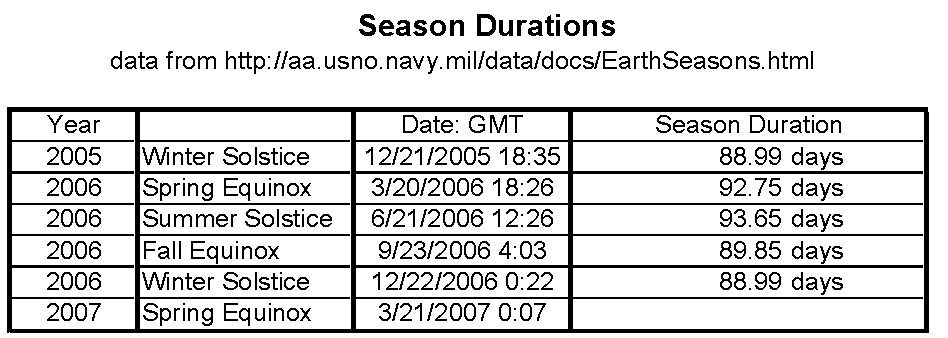
The length of the seasons is proportional to the area of the Earth's orbit swept between the solstices and equinoxes.

Today in the Northern Hemisphere, summer is 4.66 days longer than winter and spring is 2.9 days longer than autumn. As axial precession changes the place in the Earth's orbit where the solstices and equinoxes occur, Northern Hemisphere winters will get longer and summers will get shorter, eventually creating conditions believed to be favourable for triggering the next glacial period.

The arrangements of land masses on the Earth's surface are believed to reinforce the orbital forcing effects. Comparisons of plate tectonic continent reconstructions and paleoclimatic studies show that the Milankovitch cycles have the greatest effect during geologic eras when landmasses have been concentrated in polar regions, as is the case today. Greenland, Antarctica, and the northern portions of Europe, Asia, and North America are situated such that a minor change in solar energy will tip the balance in the climate of the Arctic, between year-round snow/ice preservation and complete summer melting. The presence or absence of snow and ice is a well-understood positive feedback mechanism for climate.

== See also ==
- Paleocene–Eocene Thermal Maximum § Orbital forcing
