= Tarfaya Basin =

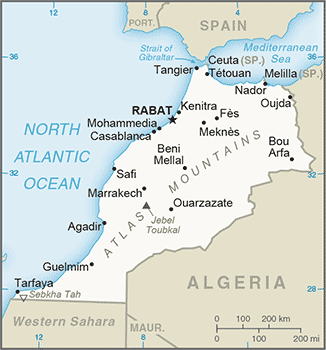
Morocco is located on the northwestern coast of Africa bordering the Atlantic Ocean and Mediterranean Sea. The Tarfaya Basin is located offshore of the city of Tarfaya near the southern border of Morocco.

The Tarfaya Basin is a structural basin located in southern Morocco that extends westward into the Moroccan territorial waters in the Atlantic Ocean. The basin is named for the city of Tarfaya located near the border of Western Sahara, a region governed by the Kingdom of Morocco. The Canary Islands form the western edge of the basin and lie approximately 100 km to the west.

Tarfaya Basin is characterized as a passive continental marginal basin. Other basins of northwestern Africa, along the Atlantic Ocean margin all formed in a similar manner. To the north, the Tarfaya Basin is bordered by the Agadir and Essaousoura Basins, and to the south it is bordered by the Aauin Basin in Western Sahara. Additionally, the Tarfaya Basin and the other basins of northwestern Africa have been characterized as analogs and conjugates to the Nova Scotia Basin offshore from southeastern Canada.

== Geologic history ==
=== Rifting and early oceanic spreading ===
The initial rifting of Pangea began 260 million years before present during the Late Permian and persisted through the Triassic. Throughout this stage of rifting, the continental crust was thinned and separation of North America from northwestern Africa began. Normal faulting in a northeast–southwest direction created a series of grabens and half-grabens developed as the thinned crust subsided. Subsidence led to the formation of a shallow basin without forming an ocean.

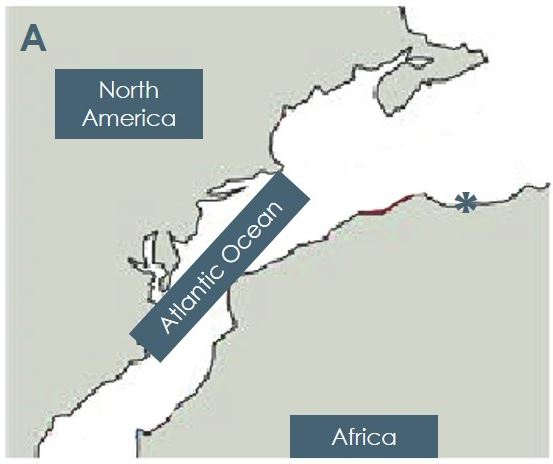
In Figure A, initial rifting of the Africa and North America resulted in the creation of a narrow seaway.

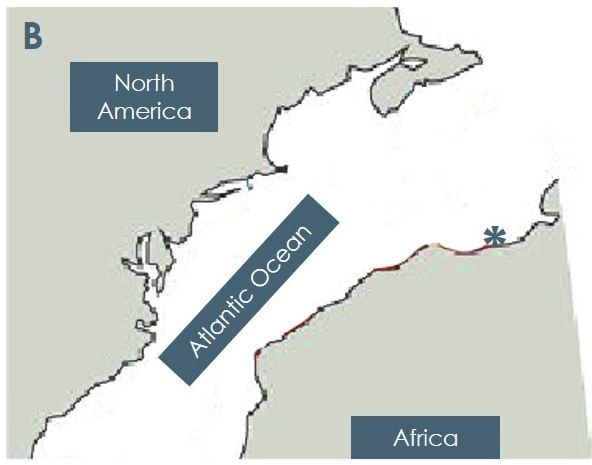
In Figure B, seafloor spreading resulted in the formation of the Atlantic Ocean.

The dimensions of the graben and half-graben basins range from 20 to 30 km in width, east to west and 50–100 km in length, north to south. Initial infilling of the basins began via transport of sediment from continental stream and river basins concurrently with the rifting during the Late Triassic as rivers transported red-brown sediment, characteristic of the geologic period. Up to 5,000 meters of these red-brown sediment beds were deposited through the Late Triassic.

At 200 million years before the present, prior to the beginning of oceanic spreading, the Central Atlantic Magmatic Province created igneous sills and dykes that overlay the late Triassic sedimentary rocks.

At the beginning of the Jurassic, the early basin remained narrow but was subject to transgression by seawater. This resulted in the creation of a shallow sea that was often subject to large changes in water depth. As saltwater filled the shallow sea, evaporation caused the loss of seawater while leaving salt in the basin. Over the course of 1 million years, upwards of 1,500 meters of salt was deposited. Salt migration began during Jurassic with sediment loading. However, the main mechanisms for the salt migration developed later.

=== Oceanic spreading and Jurassic deposition ===
Oceanic spreading began in the Early Jurassic, allowing for the stabilization of the water levels in the Atlantic Ocean. Spreading rates have been variably calculated by different models at 8 mm/year and at 20 mm/year. What can be agreed is that initial oceanic spreading proceeded at a slow rate and later increased significantly. The spreading rate doubled through the Middle Jurassic allowing for accommodation space in a wider basin. Another factor that affected accommodation space was subsidence rates of 150 mm/year that resulted from seafloor spreading.

Through the Jurassic, the Atlantic margin along the coast of Morocco developed large carbonate ramps. These ramps grew thicker and wider throughout the Jurassic through periods of oceanic spreading and subsidence. As the crust thinned and subsided, additional space in the shallow early Atlantic Ocean allowed for the development of new layers on the carbonate ramp. Carbonate reefs developed as Oxfordian-Kimmeridgian platforms eventually grew into reef mounds. As the Jurassic ended, carbonate platform growth slowed. A late Jurassic regression exposed the carbonate reefs and platforms. This exposure of the carbonates led to severe erosion and creation of karsts on the carbonate ramp.

=== Cretaceous delta development ===
As sea levels began to rise again during the early Cretaceous, the exposed Jurassic shelf was flooded. Increased temperatures during the Cretaceous, along with increased erosion inland, resulted in the transport of large amounts of clastic materials. Fine-grained clastics formed the basis of deltaic complexes along the coastal margin. Increased accommodation space during highstands allowed for the deposition of silty material over the carbonates of the former Jurassic shelf. These silty materials eventually buried the carbonates as prograding deltas developed in the Early Cretaceous. Within these deltaic sequences, a number of shale units were deposited.

=== Atlas Mountains uplift and inversion and Cenozoic deposition ===
Near the end of the Cretaceous and the beginning of the Tertiary, the African and Eurasian continental plates converged and collided, the Atlas Mountains were created by uplift. This reactivated the underlying faults along the Atlantic margin and caused compression. As the Atlas Mountains increased in elevation, sedimentation rates increased. These sediments were transported throughout the Tertiary to the Atlantic Ocean deep basin during early Cenozoic lowstands. As the Atlantic Ocean has continued its spreading to modern times, sedimentation has occurred via clastic deposition of fine-grain aeolian clastics and hemipelagic sediment. The result has been thinly bedded shale deposits that have grown in thickness over time.

== Major sources and reservoirs of hydrocarbons ==
=== Paleozoic source and Early Jurassic reservoir ===
Onshore studies of outcrops associated with the rift zone have identified Silurian shales and Devonian limestones as potential sources for hydrocarbons. The Late Triassic and Early Jurassic red-brown conglomerates and sandstones have been identified as the potential reservoir. However, wells have not targeted these intervals due to current depths, there is a high probability that potential sources of hydrocarbons have matured past the point of oil and gas generation.

=== Jurassic carbonate source and Early Cretaceous sandstone reservoirs ===
Thick dolomites and carbonates deposited during the Jurassic contain relatively low total organic content, below 5%, have reached the proper maturity for gas generation. This gas has migrated into sandstone reservoirs of Aptian and Albian age.

=== Cretaceous shale source and Paleogene turbidites and submarine fan reservoirs ===
The Cenomanian-Turonian anoxic event in the mid Cretaceous deposited shales with an average organic content 6-10%, including samples that have reached over 15% organic content. On average, these shales have thicknesses of 22 meters. Overlying shales provide additional thickness for the source rocks of this system. The maturity levels for the shales range from immature to the main oil window. The petroleum generated from these shales has migrated to deep-water turbidites and submarine fans generated in the Paleogene. These reservoir sands range from 50 to 150 meters in thickness.

== Potential mechanisms for hydrocarbon reservoirs ==
=== Salt Structures ===
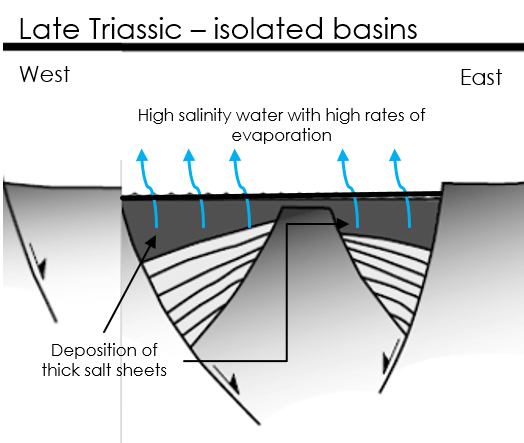
Early Atlantic Basin Rifting - Isolated basins containing waters with high salinity were subject to high rates of evaporation. This led to the deposition of thick salt sheets

The thickest salt deposits occurred in isolated grabens and half-grabens following the initial rifting, prior to oceanic spreading leading to a series of thick salt sheets. As oceanic spreading proceeded and carbonate shelves developed, sediment loading led to the upward migration of these salt sheets due to the differences in buoyancy. Initially, these salt structures became typical salt domes and diapirs. The upward migration of salt resulted in faulting of the Jurassic carbonates and Cretaceous shales. This has created numerous blocks where hydrocarbons may accumulate. These blocks include rollover faults and anticline structures.

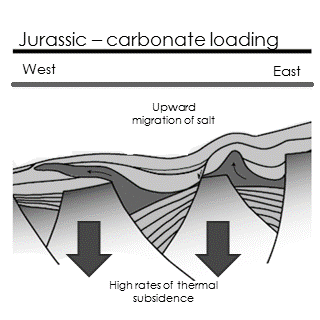
Jurassic Carbonate Ramp Development - As the Atlantic Ocean spread, regional carbonate development occurred in shallow seas. This caused the migration of salt upward.

With the beginning of the Atlas Mountains orogeny and basin inversion, the salt domes and diapirs experienced lateral migration due to compression. This lateral migration deformed the salt, leading to the development of diapirs consisting of wide canopy-shaped tops.

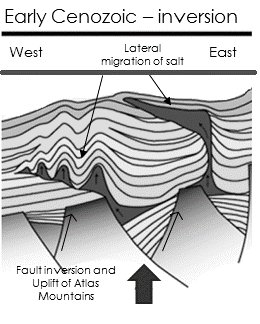
Cenozoic Inversion and Salt Migration - With the inversion of the Atlas Mountains, faults were reactivated and caused salt domes to shear toward the basin. This resulted in large canopy tops to the salt structures.

Additionally, some diapirs have been fully separated from the base of the salt, creating salt sheets within younger formations. Since the inversion and deformation occurred in the late Cretaceous and early Tertiary, all of these salt formations have been covered by shales and sandstones deposited during these intervals. As upward migration continues, the rock overlying the salt has been deformed into anticlines where hydrocarbons may accumulate.

Since these salt formations have a wide lateral extent, increased difficulty has been experienced in all phases of exploration. Seismic interpretation below the canopies is more difficult to effectively process. Additionally, drilling costs through the salt formations to reach the underlying rocks serving as potential reservoirs has decreased the economic viability of wells in the region.

=== Seals ===
The base of the salts deposited in the early rift phase serves as a probable seal for late Triassic red conglomerates as well as early Jurassic sandstones.

Of higher importance in the basin, a number shale intervals provide caps over reservoir sands. In the Cretaceous, deposition during the Cenomanian-Turonian anoxic event produced thick shale intervals up to 22 meters thick. They mark an important seal capping gas reservoirs in early Cretaceous sandstones sourced by Jurassic carbonates. These mid-Cretaceous shales also serve as source rock for reservoirs found in Paleogene turbidites and basin fan complexes.

During the Cenozoic, shale intervals deposited in the Miocene reach thicknesses over 1,000 meters. These formations cap Eocene and Oligocene turbidites and basin fan complexes, as well as sandstones deposited above salt diapirs.

== Exploration and production history ==
The Kingdom of Morocco created the Office of Hydrocarbons and Mining (ONHYM) in 2003 following amendments to laws governing hydrocarbon exploitation in order to encourage foreign investment. The ONHYM serves as both a minerals ministry and nationalized oil company. In recent years, the number of exploration contracts to conduct seismic surveys granted by the Moroccan government has increased.

As of 2015, the ONHYM is in partnership with more than 20 companies from Europe and North America to explore 78 offshore projects. Morocco seeks first to utilize oil and gas discoveries within Morocco and has no current plans to begin petroleum or natural gas exports. Within the Tarfaya Basin, ten companies are currently operating in the region and include Dana, Petronas, Repsol, San Leon Energy, Statoil, Suncor Energy Inc, Chevron, BP, and Kosmos Energy.

The ONHYM has divided the Tarfaya Basin into blocks for exploration purposes. Presently, no wells in the Tarfaya offshore blocks have proven to be economical due to a variety of factors including the falling prices of oil and gas, reservoir maturity, and lack of volume. Thus, no offshore discoveries have made it to full production.

Due to the presence of hydrocarbons during previous exploration activities, partner companies have not abandoned the Tarfaya Basin and continue exploration activities, including acquisition of additional seismic surveys. Preparations are ongoing for the drilling of additional wells pending market rebounds. Following the decline of oil prices in 2014, activity in exploratory wells was suspended. Numerous companies continue their activities in Morocco because of favorable economic conditions and political stability. However, plans for future drilling, according to ONHYM, are expected to proceed by 2020.
