= Weissert Event =

Hyperthermal event during the Early Cretaceous epoch

The Weissert Event, also referred to as the Weissert Thermal Excursion (WTX), was a hyperthermal event that occurred in the Valanginian stage of the Early Cretaceous epoch. This thermal excursion occurred amidst the relatively cool Tithonian-early Barremian Cool Interval (TEBCI). Its termination marked an intense cooling event, potentially even an ice age.

== Duration ==
The start of the WTX has been astrochronologically dated by one study to 134.50 ± 0.19 million years ago (Ma), with its positive δ^{13}C excursion being found to last until 133.96 ± 0.19 Ma and the plateau phase of elevated δ^{13}C values until 132.44 ± 0.19 Ma. However, astrochronological studies of sediments in the Vocontian Basin have yielded a duration of 2.08 Myr, with the positive δ^{13}C excursion being 0.94 Myr in duration and the δ^{13}C plateau being 1.14 Myr. A different study concludes the WTX lasted for about 1.4 million years (Myr) based on the chronological length of the high δ^{13}C plateau observed over its course in the Bersek Marl Formation of Hungary.

== Causes ==
An addition of carbon dioxide into the atmosphere via the activity of the Paraná-Etendeka Large Igneous Province (PE-LIP) is generally accepted as the leading candidate for what sparked the WTX, although this is not universally accepted, with some reconstructed geochronologies showing a lack of causality between the emplacement of the PE-LIP and the onset of the WTX. The prolonged, drawn out manner in which the PE-LIP erupted has been brought up as a further argument against its emplacement as the driving perturbation causing the WTX.

== Effects ==
The WTX resulted in a rapid global temperature increase during the otherwise mild TEBCI. The sharp jump in global temperatures during this hyperthermal event was accompanied by oceanic anoxia. However, unlike other oceanic anoxic events, the WTX is not associated with widespread black shale deposits. Nannoconids experienced a decline at the onset of the WTX resulting from marine regression, but bloomed in abundance later on in the event as ocean productivity skyrocketed. In the Vocontian Basin, the WTX is associated with an increase in marlstones. At the end of the WTX, temperatures cooled by ~1–2 °C based on the results of palaeothermometry done in southern France, whereas the Boreal Ocean and its surroundings cooled by as much as 4 °C. Geochemical records of ^{187}Os/^{188}Os point to an increase in unradiogenic osmium flux into the ocean, suggesting the occurrence of silicate weathering of PE-LIP basalts during this slice of time, providing the most likely explanation for the temperature drop. Some studies have suggested that a transient ice age with limited but significant polar ice caps occurred in the aftermath of the WTX, although the lack of a positive δ^{18}O_{seawater} excursion during the latest Valanginian interval of cooling and the presence instead of a very slightly negative excursion calls into question the existence of any significant polar ice growth.
