= Breistroffer Event =

Oceanic anoxic event during the Middle Cretaceous

The Breistroffer Event (OAE1d) was an oceanic anoxic event (OAE) that occurred during the Middle Cretaceous period, specifically in the latest Albian, around 101 million years ago (Ma).

== Causes ==
A rise in carbon dioxide and consequent negative carbon isotope excursion (CIE) ensued at the start of OAE1d, causing global temperatures to rise by 2 °C. During the Breistroffer Thermal Maximum, as this climatic interval has been referred to, Earth's mean surface air temperature was 23.3 °C. Average sea surface temperatures (SSTs) were 3 to 5 °C higher than today. Mercury anomalies from the time of the event implicate large igneous province volcanism from the Kerguelen Plateau as the cause of the rise in global temperatures.

An alternative hypothesis implicating enhanced monsoons forced by Milankovitch cycles rather than volcanism has also been proposed, based on the lack of unradiogenic osmium isotope ratio fluctuations observed during OAE1d. Total organic carbon values and carbon and oxygen isotope records from the La Grita Member of the Capacho Formation of Venezuela show a cyclic variation supporting the enhanced monsoonal hypothesis.

One possible cause of OAE1d relates to a possible 5-6 Myr cycle in the rate of phosphorus weathering throughout the middle of the Cretaceous period, at one of the peaks of which OAE1d ensued. This cycle would have been sustained and enhanced by fast-acting positive feedbacks of increased biological productivity and deoxygenation in response to elevated oceanic phosphate concentrations, but eventually mitigated and reversed by longer term negative feedbacks of increasing atmospheric oxygen content, which would have increased wildfire activity and caused a decline in vegetation, slowing down chemical weathering and returned the phosphorus cycle back to its starting state.

== Effects ==
Anoxia developed because of the reduction of seawater solubility of oxygen caused by global temperature rise. Increased terrigeneous flux of nutrients into the ocean is known to have occurred in Australia and Venezuela during OAE1d and may have been an additional factor helping to deoxygenate seawater. The OAE that occurred resulted in a positive CIE, reflecting an enhancement in burial of organic carbon. The positive CIE's presence in nearshore settings, indicating that deep water anoxia expanded into shallow water.

On land, a brief warm-wet climatic spike and a surge in angiosperm biodiversity occurred coevally with the deposition of black shales during OAE1d. Angiosperm mangal and conifer-dominated swamps thrived during this warm-wet spike in what is now central North America. In Bulgaria, where angiosperms were still a minor component of the flora that was dominated by gymnosperms and pteridophyte spores, plant communities remained stable across OAE1d.

== See also ==
- Bonarelli Event – Anoxic extinction event in the Cretaceous period
- Jenkyns Event – Largest anoxic event in the Jurassic period and Phanerozoic eon
- Palaeocene-Eocene Thermal Maximum – Global warming about 55 million years ago
- Paquier Event – Anoxic event during the Middle Cretaceous
- Selli Event – Oceanic anoxic event during the Early Cretaceous
