= International Giovanni Sacchi Landriani Prize =

- Description: Award recognizing important original contributions to the field of numerical methods for partial differential equations
- Country: Italy
- Presented by: Istituto Lombardo, Accademia di Scienze e Lettere

The International Giovanni Sacchi Landriani Prize is awarded every two years by the Istituto Lombardo, Accademia di Scienze e Lettere to recognize important original contributions to the field of numerical methods for partial differential equations during the preceding five years. The prize, first awarded in 1991, honors numerical analyst Giovanni Sacchi Landriani, who died in 1989 at age 31.

== Recipients ==
The recipients of the International Giovanni Sacchi Landriani Prize are:

- 2007: Alessandro Veneziani
- 2005: Barbara Wohlmuth
- 2003: Claude Le Bris
- 1997: Benoît Perthame
- 1995: Anthony T. Patera
- 1993: Ricardo H. Nochetto
- 1991: Douglas N. Arnold

== See also ==
- List of mathematics awards
