= Ragnar Winther =

Norwegian mathematician (born 1949)

Ragnar Winther (born 4 January 1949) is a Norwegian mathematician.

He took his PhD in 1977, and was appointed professor at the University of Oslo in 1991. In 2002 he became the leader of the Centre of Mathematics for Applications there. He is a member of the Norwegian Academy of Science and Letters. In 2012 he became a fellow of the American Mathematical Society.
