= Selli Event =

Oceanic anoxic event during the Early Cretaceous

The Selli Event, also known as OAE1a, was an oceanic anoxic event (OAE) of global scale that occurred during the start of the Aptian stage of the Early Cretaceous, about 120.5 million years ago (Ma). The OAE is associated with large igneous province volcanism and an extinction event of marine organisms driven by global warming, ocean acidification, and anoxia.

== Timing ==
The negative δ^{13}C excursion representing the onset of OAE1a was rapid, taking only 22,000-47,000 years. The recovery of the global climate from the injection of large amounts of isotopically light carbon lasted for over a million years. The end of OAE1a is characterised by a positive δ^{13}C excursion, which had a magnitude of +4 to +5%. The OAE lasted for about 1.1 to 1.3 Myr in total; one high-precision estimate put the length of OAE1a at 1.157 Myr.

== Causes ==
=== Global warming ===
OAE1a ensued during a hot climatic interval, with the global average temperature being around 21.5 °C. The Tethys Ocean experienced an increase in humidity at the beginning of OAE1a, while conditions around the Boreal Ocean were initially dry and only humidified later on during the OAE.

The increase in global temperatures that caused OAE1a was most likely driven by large igneous province (LIP) volcanism. The negative δ^{13}C excursion preceding the OAE, occurring in the C3 isotopic interval, is believed to reflect volcanic release of carbon dioxide into the atmosphere and its consequent warming of the Earth. Enrichments in unradiogenic osmium, which is primarily derived from alteration of oceanic crust by hydrothermal volcanism, further bolster volcanism as the driver of OAE1a. Multiple LIPs have been implicated as causes of the rapid global warming responsible for the onset of OAE1a, including the High Arctic Large Igneous Province (HALIP), the Kerguelen Plateau, and the Ontong Java Plateau. The rate of greenhouse gas emissions leading up to OAE1a was relatively slow, causing the anoxic event to only generate a minor extinction event, in contrast to the severe LIP-induced Capitanian, Permian-Triassic, and Triassic-Jurassic mass extinctions and the ongoing Holocene extinction caused in part by anthropogenic greenhouse gas release, each of which were or are characterised by a very high rate of carbon dioxide discharge. Despite a much smaller methane clathrate reservoir relative to the present day, the degassing of methane clathrate deposits may have nonetheless significantly exacerbated volcanic warming. Following OAE1a, δ^{18}O values increased, indicating a drop in temperatures that coincided with a δ^{13}C_{org} decline, which began in the C4 isotopic phase of the interval.

=== Enhanced phosphorus recycling ===
OAE1a coincided with a peak in a 5-6 Myr periodicity cycle in the accumulation of phosphorus in marine sediments. During such peaks, the short-term positive feedback loop of increased biological productivity caused by an abundance of phosphorus that caused decreased oxygenation of seawater that then caused increased regeneration of phosphorus from marine sediments dominated, but it was eventually mitigated by a long-term negative feedback loop caused by an increase in atmospheric oxygen that resulted in enhanced wildfire activity and diminished phosphorus input into the oceans. An increase in the ratios of organic carbon to reactive phosphorus species and of total nitrogen to reactive phosphorus confirms leakage of sedimentary phosphorus back into the water column occurred during OAE1a, with this process likely being accelerated by the increased global temperatures of the time.

== Effects ==
Marine productivity increased. The productivity spike was likely driven by an increase in iron availability. Increased sulphate flux from volcanism caused an increase in hydrogen sulphide production, which in turn increased phosphorus availability in the water column by inhibiting its burial on the seafloor and enabled the development of anoxia.

The large-scale volcanic release of carbon dioxide caused a drop in the pH of seawater at the start of OAE1a, as much of this excess carbon dioxide was absorbed by the ocean and dissolved as carbonic acid. Seawater carbonate-saturation was severely reduced. Ocean acidification began shortly after the negative δ^{13}C excursion and lasted for approximately 0.85 Myr. The drop in seawater pH was associated with the acme of the carbonate crisis.

δ^{7}Li measurements indicate an enrichment in isotopically light lithium coeval with the negative δ^{13}C excursion, signifying an increase in silicate weathering amidst the volcanically induced global warming of OAE1a. A second negative δ^{7}Li excursion occurred synchronously with a strontium isotope minimum, demarcating another peak in silicate weathering. This weathering may have buffered the warming effects of large igneous province volcanism and helped to cool the Earth back to its pre-OAE1a state.

Sea levels initially fell during OAE1a as the world warmed and later rose as global cooling occurred, indicating the dominance of aquifer-eustasy in controlling sea level change during this anoxic event.

Organic carbon burial increased during OAE1a and was heightened during intervals of enhanced humidity. OAE1a, as with other OAEs, exhibited widespread deposition of black shales rich in organic matter incapable of being decomposed on the seabed, as the anoxic conditions prohibited habitation of most microbial decomposers. Black shale deposition begins during the C6 stage of OAE1a and lasted for around 0.4 Myr. As with silicate weathering, organic carbon burial acted as a negative feedback on global warming.

Overall, the biotic effects of OAE1a were comparatively minor relative to other LIP-driven extinction events. Nannoconids that were highly calcified suffered significant decline during OAE1a, likely as a consequence of ocean acidification, although this causal relationship is disputed by other authors. The opportunistic, oyster-like bivalve genus Chondrodonta thrived during OAE1a because of its ability to survive in stressed environments where its competitors could not, and its spike in abundance is often used as a biostratigraphic indicator of the onset of OAE1a.

== See also ==
- Aptian extinction
- Ireviken Event
- Lundgreni Event
- Mulde Event
- Lau Event
- Šilalė Event
- Jenkyns Event
- Paquier Event
- Amadeus Event
- Breistroffer Event
- Bonarelli Event
