= Madagascar flood basalt =

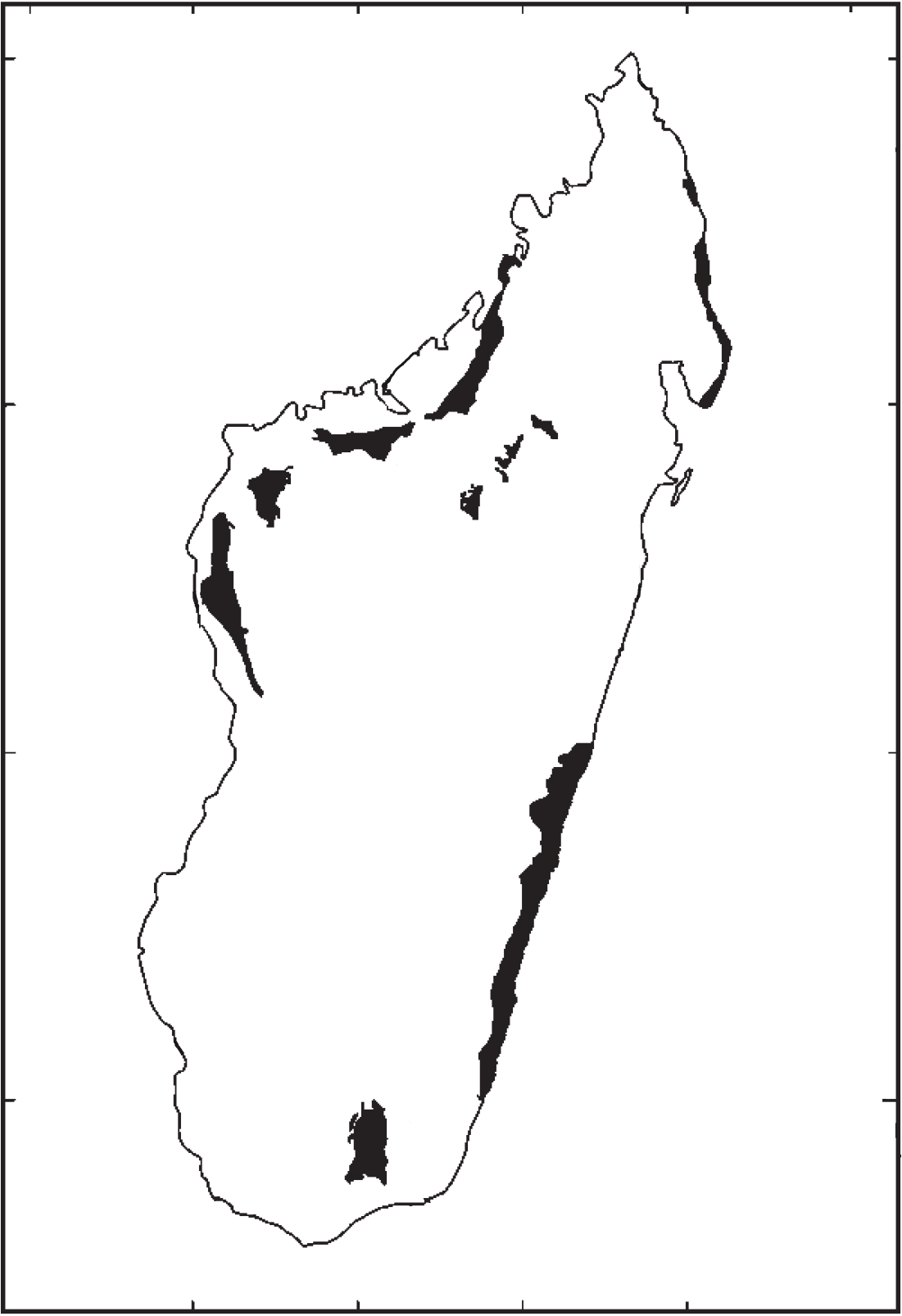
Map showing locations of flood basalts on Madagascar

The Madagascar flood basalt, also known as the Madagascar large igneous province (LIP), is one of the major magmatic events of the Late Cretaceous. They cover a large area of basaltic and rhyolitic lava flows that erupted during an episode of widespread basaltic volcanism during the Cretaceous period. The flood basalts are characterized by lava flows, dykes, sills, and intrusions, and other volcanic features include plugs, scoria, and spatter cones. Tholeiitic basalt constitutes the primary rock type.

== Geologic setting ==
The formation of three major sedimentary basins on the western edge of Madagascar occurred as a result of crustal extension in the center of Gondwana since Permo-Carboniferous times. These basins include Morondava, Mahajanga, and Ambilobe basins. The Morondava basin overlies the Precambrian basement and is composed of a thick sequence of Carboniferous to Late Triassic sedimentary rocks from the Karoo Supergroup as well as Middle Jurassic to Cenozoic rocks. The Mahajanga, the second largest basin in Madagascar, extends 400 km along the northwestern coast and is filled by a thick sequence of sediments from the Karoo Supergroup deposited during the Late Permian to early Jurassic. During the Late Cretaceous, a sequence of flood basalts up to 200 m thick covered Permo-Triassic and Lower Cretaceous sedimentary sequences. These basalt flows cover a wide area of the basin and form the Antanimena and Bongolava-Manasamody plateaus. During the Early Cenozoic, Madagascar experienced regional uplift and intracontinental rifting. This can be evidenced by the development of several graben or half graben systems throughout the island as well as the uplift in the central backbone of the island.

== Age and extent ==
The volcanism began in northern Madagascar and moved toward southern Madagascar over a period of several million years. While age constraints on the flood basalts vary depending on the source, most concur that the volcanism occurred between 85 and 92 Ma using argon-argon dating processes. In northern Madagascar, ages ranged from 88 to 92 Ma, while in southern Madagascar, ages ranged from 85 to 88 Ma. Argon-argon and uranium-lead dating both indicate that the volcanism first ended in the northern part of the island. The extent of the volcanism covers the rifted margin of the eastern coast of Madagascar, the Mahajanga and Morondava basins in western Madagascar. It extends down to the Precambrian basement. Prior to erosional effects, the flood basalts covered over approximately 1,000,000 km^{2}.

== Formation ==
The magmatic evolution of the flood basalts show evidence of different parental magmas, fractionation, and open system processes. Mafic tholeittic samples model N-MORB magmas from a depleted mantle source and likely experienced a small amount of crustal contamination in the form of light rare earth element enriched, crust-derived melt. The presence of MORB-like rocks could indicate that an asthenospheric mantle source was important in west-central Madagascar. Some mafic rocks of transitional-alkaline composition fractionated to evolved basaltic composition. The transitional-alkaline rocks also closely model MORB and were likely formed by low degrees of partial melting from a depleted mantle source. Chemical and isotopic differences between different magmas in different areas of the large igneous province indicate independent parental magmas and differences in source regions.

== Petrographic and geochemical characteristics ==
The magmatic evolution of the basalts is dominated by low pressure crystal fractionation from olivine, chromium-spinel, plagioclase, and clinopyroxene. The basalts can be split to form two subprovinces based on concentration of incompatible elements and geographical position. The western subprovince is composed of mafic and intermediate rocks. They have a low abundance of high field strength elements, negative Nb anomalies, and a wide range of initial ^{144}Nd/^{143}Nd. These characteristics are similar to N-MORB mantle sources with low pressure crustal contamination. The eastern subprovince is composed of mafic rocks that are mildly enriched in incompatible elements. The highest concentrations of incompatible elements are found in tholeiites of the Mahajanga basin, the Tampokesta Kamoreen area and the Tamatave area. ^{144}Nd/^{143}Nd ratios also have a narrower initial range. These characteristics are similar to enriched mantle sources with minor crustal contamination. There has also been no clear evidence that the geochemical characteristics in the Madagascar flood basalts are similar to observed in the Marion hotspot lavas, basaltic and rhyolitic lavas that also erupted in Madagascar during the Late Cretaceous.

== See also ==
- List of flood basalt provinces
