= Caribbean large igneous province =

Accumulation of igneous rocks

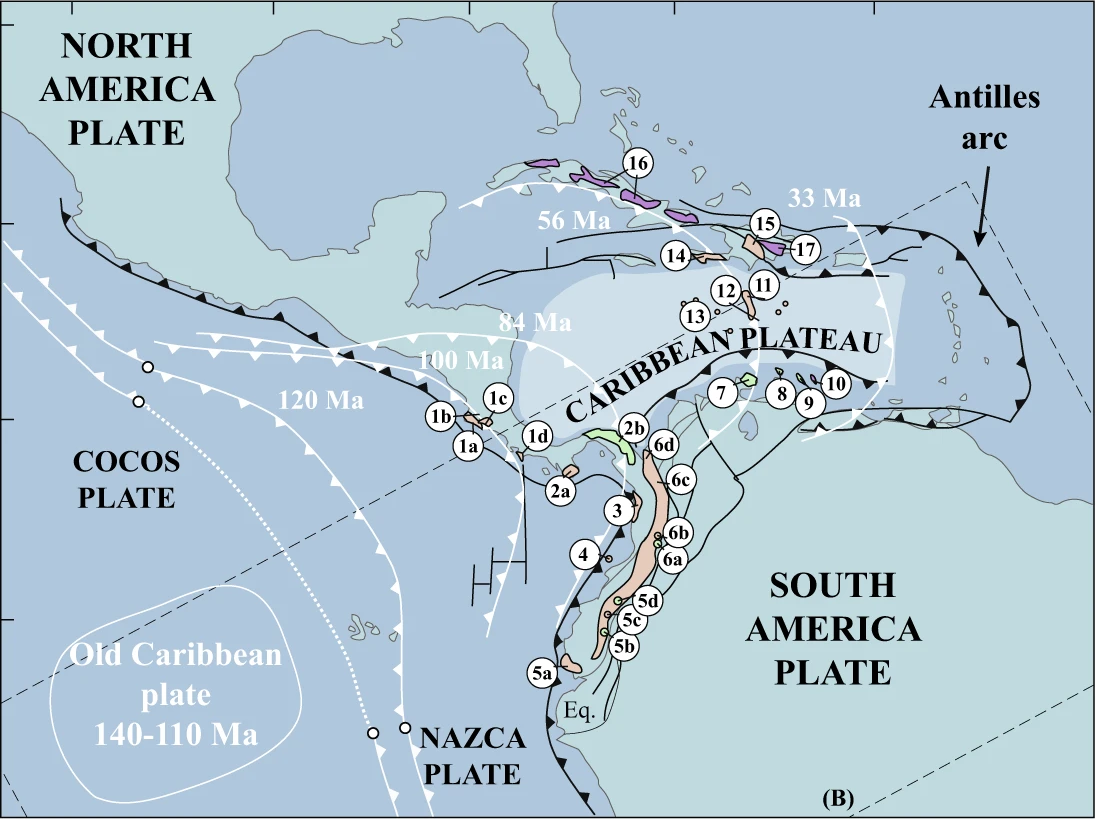
Actual and reconstructed position of the Caribbean plateau

The Caribbean large igneous province (CLIP) consists of a major flood basalt, which created this large igneous province (LIP). It is the source of the current large eastern Pacific oceanic plateau, of which the Caribbean-Colombian oceanic plateau is the tectonized remnant. The deeper levels of the plateau have been exposed on its margins at the North American and South American plates. The volcanism took place between 139 and 69 million years ago (Ma), with the majority of activity appearing to lie between 95 and 88 Ma. The plateau volume has been estimated as on the order of 4 million km^{3} (0.96 million cu mi). It has been linked to the Galápagos hotspot.

== Proto-Caribbean Seaway ==
Divergence between the North American and South American Plates began to create oceanic crust off Colombia's Pacific coast by the end of the Jurassic (150 Ma). This divergence, which continued until at least 66 Ma, first resulted in a "proto-Caribbean spreading ridge" between these plates flanked by a perpendicular transform zone on its Pacific side. By 135–130 Ma, the subduction of the Farallon Plate had begun along this transform zone, effectively modifying it into a subduction zone and beginning the creation of the Great Caribbean Arch. This arch was formed around 120-115 Ma but must have been intersected by the Caribbean spreading ridge until 66 Ma. Hence, the Farallon Plate fed the spreading zone and later became the Caribbean Plate.

== LIP formation ==
CLIP formed as a large igneous province and now forms a thickened zone of oceanic crust between the North American and South American plates. In some places the oceanic crust is 2–3 times as thick as normal oceanic crust (15–20 km (9.3–12.4 mi) vs 7 km (4.3 mi). Its composition is similar to that of the Ontong Java Plateau.

Geochemical and geochronological evidences clearly indicate that the Galápagos hotspot initiated the formation of the CLIP 95-90 Ma in the eastern Pacific. From there it moved north-east with the Farallon Plate between the two American plates until it collided with a volcanic arc, the Greater Antilles 60 million years later. Fragments of this voyage is preserved in accreted seamounts along the Central American coast and the Cocos and Carnegie Ridges. Isotopic profiles of Galápagos rocks can be matched with those from CLIP rocks.

92–63 Ma ^{40}Ar/^{39}Ar ages have been reported for the Curaçao Lava Formation and 94–83 ma for the Dumisseau Formation in Haiti, dating both locations back to the original LIP formation 94 Ma. CLIP volcanism originates from the plume-like source distinct from a MORB (mid-ocean ridge basalt) mantle. The long duration of CLIP volcanism can be explained by the interaction between a plume and the Greater Antilles subduction zone.

The margins of the CLIP have been uplifted and are exposed above sea level, which makes it unique among oceanic plateaus. It stretches 2,500 km (1,600 mi) east to west and 1,300 km (810 mi) north to south. The CLIP is composed of irregularly thickened (up to 20 km (12 mi)) oceanic crust of the Caribbean Plate and the deformed associated magmatic terranes obducted onto the Pacific coasts of northern South America, Central America, and the Antilles. One of the least deformed parts is Gorgona Island off Colombia's Pacific coast.

The CLIP was created during three phases of eruptions dating between the Aptian and the Maastrichtian: a first phase 124–112 Ma; the main magma production phase 94–83 Ma; and an 80–72 Ma phase. The youngest igneous rocks, in the Dominican Republic and Costa Rica, are from 63 Ma. That the CLIP originated in the Pacific is obvious because fragments of oceanic crust accreted to the margins of the Caribbean, for example on Hispaniola and Puerto Rico, contain fauna of Pacific provenance.

The Farallon Plate's eastward movement forced the northern half of the CLIP into the ocean basin that had opened between North and South America starting in the Jurassic. However, the mechanisms causing the NE movement of the CLIP remains unclear, especially considering the subduction in the Costa Rica-Panama arc initiated during the Campanian (83–72 Ma). The Galápagos hotspot is probably responsible for the main plume-related magmatic event 90 Ma, whilst the 76 Ma and 55 Ma event are related to lithospheric thinning in the Central Caribbean.

^{40}Ar/^{39}Ar dating have determined that the main magmatism occurred 95 to 83 million years ago (Ma) while a second pulse occurred 81-69 Ma. Around 86 Ma the arrival of a large plume initiated the Galápagos hotspot which resulted in volcanism over large parts of the Caribbean Plate and north-west South America. Renewed volcanism about 75 Ma has been attributed to either the Galápagos hotspot, thinning of the lithosphere coupled with associated melting and upwelling of plume-head material, or both.

Seismic and geochemical analyses, on the other hand, suggest the CLIP consists of several oceanic plateaus and palaeo-hotspot tracks formed 139-83 Ma some of which have been overprinted by later magmatism. If these first volcanic activities were generated by the Galápagos hotspot, it would make it the oldest still active hotspot on Earth.

== See also ==
- Cenomanian-Turonian boundary event, also known as the second Oceanic Anoxic Event (OAE-2)
