= Toarcian Oceanic Anoxic Event =

Largest anoxic event in the Jurassic period and Phanerozoic eon

The Toarcian extinction event, also called the Pliensbachian-Toarcian extinction event, the Early Toarcian mass extinction, the Early Toarcian palaeoenvironmental crisis, or the Jenkyns Event (named after Hugh Jenkyns), was an extinction event that occurred during the early part of the Toarcian age, approximately 183 million years ago, during the Early Jurassic. The extinction event had two main pulses, the first being the Pliensbachian-Toarcian boundary event (PTo-E). The second, larger pulse, the Toarcian Oceanic Anoxic Event (TOAE), was a global oceanic anoxic event, representing possibly the most extreme case of widespread ocean deoxygenation in the entire Phanerozoic eon. In addition to the PTo-E and TOAE, there were multiple other, smaller extinction pulses within this span of time.

Occurring during the supergreenhouse climate of the Early Toarcian Thermal Maximum (ETTM), the Early Toarcian extinction was associated with large igneous province volcanism, considerable CO_{2} emissions which elevated global temperatures, acidified the oceans, increased continental weathering and nutrients fluxes (phosphate) towards the oceans, resulting in their eutrophication, which prompted the development of anoxia, leading to a severe biodiversity loss. The biogeochemical crisis is documented by a high amplitude negative carbon isotope excursions, as well as black shale deposition.

The subsurface at Gajum, in Canzo, Italy, is crucial for the study of the Toarcian age due to the extraordinary thickness (15.35 m) of the "fish level", a layer of dark, organic-rich sediments. Composed of pelagic marly limestones, marls, and marly mudstones rich in calcareous nannofossils, it records high-resolution climatic and cyclostratigraphic variations, making it possible to trace the crisis and recovery of marine ecosystems during this anoxic event.

== Timing ==
The Early Toarcian extinction event occurred in two distinct pulses, with the first event being classified by some authors as its own event unrelated to the more extreme second event. The first, more recently identified pulse occurred during the mirabile subzone of the tenuicostatum ammonite zone, coinciding with a slight drop in oxygen concentrations and the beginning of warming following a late Pliensbachian cool period. This first pulse, occurring near the Pliensbachian-Toarcian boundary, is referred to as the PTo-E. The TOAE itself occurred near the tenuicostatum–serpentinum ammonite biozonal boundary, specifically in the elegantulum subzone of the serpentinum ammonite zone, during a marked, pronounced warming interval. The TOAE lasted for approximately 500,000 years, though a range of estimates from 200,000 to 1,000,000 years have also been given. The PTo-E primarily affected shallow water biota, while the TOAE was the more severe event for organisms living in deep water.

== Causes ==
Geological, isotopic, and palaeobotanical evidence suggests the late Pliensbachian was an icehouse period. These ice sheets are believed to have been thin and stretched into lower latitudes, making them extremely sensitive to temperature changes. A warming trend lasting from the latest Pliensbachian to the earliest Toarcian was interrupted by a "cold snap" in the middle polymorphum zone, equivalent to the tenuicostatum ammonite zone, which was then followed by the abrupt warming interval associated with the TOAE. This global warming, driven by rising atmospheric carbon dioxide, was the mainspring of the early Toarcian environmental crisis. Carbon dioxide levels rose from about 500 ppm to about 1,000 ppm. Seawater warmed by anywhere between 3 °C and 7 °C, depending on latitude. At the height of this supergreenhouse interval, global sea surface temperatures (SSTs) averaged about 21 °C.

=== Volcanism ===
The eruption of the Karoo-Ferrar Large Igneous Province is generally attributed to have caused the surge in atmospheric carbon dioxide levels. Argon-argon dating of Karoo-Ferrar rhyolites points to a link between Karoo-Ferrar volcanism and the extinction event, a conclusion reinforced by uranium-lead dating and palaeomagnetism. Dating of zircons suggests that the magmatic activity lasted for about 349 ± 49 kyr, although plagioclase dating suggests a duration of approximately 1.6 Myr. Occurring during a broader, gradual positive carbon isotope excursion as measured by δ^{13}C values, the TOAE is preceded by a global negative δ^{13}C excursion recognised in fossil wood, organic carbon, and carbonate carbon in the tenuicostatum ammonite zone of northwestern Europe, with this negative δ^{13}C shift being the result of volcanic discharge of light carbon. The global ubiquity of this negative δ^{13}C excursion has been called into question, however, due to its absence in certain deposits from the time, such as the Bächental bituminous marls, though its occurrence in areas like Greece has been cited as evidence of its global nature. The negative δ^{13}C shift is also known from the Arabian Peninsula, the Ordos Basin, and the Neuquén Basin. The negative δ^{13}C excursion has been found to be up to -8% in bulk organic and carbonate carbon, although analysis of compound-specific biomarkers suggests a global value of around -3% to -4%. In addition, numerous smaller scale carbon isotope excursions are globally recorded on the falling limb of the larger negative δ^{13}C excursion. Although the PTo-E is not associated with a decrease in δ^{13}C analogous to the TOAE's, volcanism is nonetheless believed to have been responsible for its onset as well, with the carbon injection most likely having an isotopically heavy, mantle-derived origin. The Karoo-Ferrar magmatism released so much carbon dioxide that it disrupted the imprint of the 9 Myr long-term carbon cycle that was otherwise steady and stable during the Jurassic and Early Cretaceous. The values of ^{187}Os/^{188}Os rose from ~0.40 to ~0.53 during the PTo-E and from ~0.42 to ~0.68 during the TOAE, and many scholars conclude this change in osmium isotope ratios evidences the responsibility of this large igneous province for the biotic crises. Mercury anomalies from the approximate time intervals corresponding to the PTo-E and TOAE have likewise been invoked as tell-tale evidence of the ecological calamity's cause being a large igneous province, although some researchers attribute these elevated mercury levels to increased terrigenous flux. There is evidence that the motion of the African plate suddenly changed in velocity, shifting from mostly northward movement to southward movement. Such shifts in plate motion are associated with similarly large igneous provinces emplaced at other times. A 2019 geochronological study argued that the emplacement of the Karoo-Ferrar large igneous province and the TOAE were not causally linked, and simply happened to occur rather close in time, contradicting mainstream interpretations of the TOAE. The authors of the study conclude that the timeline of the TOAE does not match up with the course of activity of the Karoo-Ferrar magmatic event.

=== Methane release ===
The large igneous province also intruded into coal seams, releasing even more carbon dioxide and methane than it otherwise would have. Magmatic sills are also known to have intruded into shales rich in organic carbon, causing additional venting of carbon dioxide into the atmosphere. Carbon release via metamorphic heating of coal has been criticised as a major driver of the environmental perturbation, however, on the basis that coal transects themselves do not show the δ^{13}C excursions that would be expected if significant quantities of thermogenic methane were released, suggesting that much of the degassed emissions were either condensed as pyrolytic carbon or trapped as coalbed methane.

In addition, the possible release of deep-sea methane clathrates has been implicated as yet another cause of global warming. Episodic melting of methane clathrates dictated by Milankovitch cycles has been put forward as an explanation fitting the observed shifts in the carbon isotope record. Other studies contradict and reject the methane hydrate hypothesis, however, concluding that the isotopic record is too incomplete to conclusively attribute the isotopic excursion to methane hydrate dissociation, that carbon isotope ratios in belemnites and bulk carbonates are incongruent with the isotopic signature expected from a massive release of methane clathrates, that much of the methane released from ocean sediments was rapidly sequestered, buffering its ability to act as a major positive feedback, and that methane clathrate dissociation occurred too late to have had an appreciable causal impact on the extinction event. Hypothetical release of methane clathrates extremely depleted in heavy carbon isotopes has furthermore been considered unnecessary as an explanation for the carbon cycle disruption.

It has also been hypothesised that the release of cryospheric methane trapped in permafrost amplified the warming and its detrimental effects on marine life. Obliquity-paced carbon isotope excursions have been interpreted by some researchers as reflective of permafrost decline and consequent greenhouse gas release.

=== Other drivers ===
The TOAE is believed to be the second largest anoxic event of the last 300 Ma, and possibly the largest of the Phanerozoic. A positive δ^{13}C excursion, likely resulting from the mass burial of organic carbon during the anoxic event, is known from the falciferum ammonite zone, chemostratigraphically identifying the TOAE. Large igneous province resulted in increased silicate weathering and an acceleration of the hydrological cycle, as shown by an increased amount of terrestrially derived organic matter found in sedimentary rocks of marine origin during the TOAE. Concentrations of phosphorus, magnesium, and manganese rose in the oceans. A -0.5% excursion in δ^{44/40}Ca provides further evidence of increased continental weathering. Osmium isotope ratios confirm further still a major increase in weathering. The enhanced continental weathering in turn led to increased eutrophication that helped drive the anoxic event in the oceans. Waters underwent partial denitrification in conjunction with enhanced marine productivity. Continual transport of continentally weathered nutrients into the ocean enabled high levels of primary productivity to be maintained over the course of the TOAE. Rising sea levels contributed to ocean deoxygenation; as rising sea levels inundated low-lying lands, organic plant matter was transported outwards into the ocean. An alternate model for the development of anoxia is that epicontinental seaways became salinity stratified with strong haloclines, chemoclines, and thermoclines. This caused mineralised carbon on the seafloor to be recycled back into the photic zone, driving widespread primary productivity and in turn anoxia. The freshening of the Arctic Ocean by way of melting of Northern Hemisphere ice caps was a likely trigger of such stratification and a slowdown of global thermohaline circulation. Stratification also occurred due to the freshening of surface water caused by an enhanced water cycle. Rising seawater temperatures amidst a transition from icehouse to greenhouse conditions further retarded ocean circulation, aiding the establishment of anoxic conditions. Geochemical evidence from what was then the northwestern European epicontinental sea suggests that a shift from cooler, more saline water conditions to warmer, fresher conditions prompted the development of significant density stratification of the water column and induced anoxia. The anoxia's intensity was mediated by orbital cycles. Extensive organic carbon burial induced by anoxia was a negative feedback loop retarding the otherwise pronounced warming and may have caused global cooling in the aftermath of the TOAE. In anoxic and euxinic marine basins in Europe, organic carbon burial rates increased by ~500%. Furthermore, anoxia was not limited to oceans; large lakes also experienced oxygen depletion and black shale deposition.

Euxinia occurred in the northwestern Tethys Ocean during the TOAE, as shown by a positive δ^{34}S excursion in carbonate-associated sulphate that occurs synchronously with the positive δ^{13}C excursion in carbonate carbon during the falciferum ammonite zone. This positive δ^{34}S excursion has been attributed to the depletion of isotopically light sulphur in the marine sulphate reservoir that resulted from microbial sulphur reduction in anoxic waters. Similar positive δ^{34}S excursions corresponding to the onset of TOAE are known from pyrites in the Sakahogi and Sakuraguchi-dani localities in Japan, with the Sakahogi site displaying a less extreme but still significant pyritic positive δ^{34}S excursion during the PTo-E. Euxinia is further evidenced by enhanced pyrite burial in Zázrivá, Slovakia, enhanced molybdenum burial totalling about 41 Gt of molybdenum, and δ^{98/95}Mo excursions observed in sites in the Cleveland, West Netherlands, and South German Basins. Valdorbia, a site in the Umbria-Marche Apennines, also exhibited euxinia during the anoxic event. There is less evidence of euxinia outside the northwestern Tethys, and it likely only occurred transiently in basins in Panthalassa and the southwestern Tethys. Due to the clockwise circulation of the oceanic gyre in the western Tethys and the rough, uneven bathymetry in the northward limb of this gyre, oxic bottom waters had relatively few impediments to diffuse into the southwestern Tethys, which spared it from the far greater prevalence of anoxia and euxinia that characterised the northern Tethys. The Panthalassan deep water site of Sakahogi was mainly anoxic-ferruginous across the interval spanning the late Pliensbachian to the TOAE, but transient sulphidic conditions did occur during the PTo-E and TOAE. In northeastern Panthalassa, in what is now British Columbia, euxinia dominated anoxic bottom waters.

=== Acidification ===
The early stages of the TOAE were accompanied by a decrease in the acidity of seawater following a substantial decrease prior to the TOAE. Seawater pH then dropped close to the middle of the event, strongly acidifying the oceans. The sudden decline of carbonate production during the TOAE is widely believed to be the result of this abrupt episode of ocean acidification. Additionally, the enhanced recycling of phosphorus back into seawater as a result of high temperatures and low seawater pH inhibited its mineralisation into apatite, helping contribute to oceanic anoxia. The abundance of phosphate in marine environments created a positive feedback loop that further exacerbated eutrophication and anoxia.

The extreme and rapid global warming at the start of the Toarcian intensified tropical storms across the globe. Enhanced storm activity may have buffered the spread of oxygen-minimum zones in some regions by intensifying vertical water column mixing.

== Effects on life ==
=== Marine invertebrates ===
The extinction event associated with the TOAE primarily affected marine life as a result of the collapse of the carbonate factory. Brachiopods were particularly severely hit, with the TOAE representing one of the most dire crises in their evolutionary history. Brachiopod taxa of large size declined significantly in abundance. Uniquely, the brachiopod genus Soaresirhynchia thrived during the later stages of the TOAE due to its low metabolic rate and slow rate of growth, making it a disaster taxon. The species S. bouchardi is known to have been a pioneer species that colonised areas denuded of brachiopods in the northwestern Tethyan region. Ostracods also suffered a major diversity loss, with almost all ostracod clades' distributions during the time interval corresponding to the serpentinum zone shifting towards higher latitudes to escape intolerably hot conditions near the Equator. Bivalves likewise experienced a significant turnover. The decline of bivalves exhibiting high endemism with narrow geographic ranges was particularly severe, as was the decline of bivalves with large, thick shells and high annual growth rates. At Ya Ha Tinda, a replacement of the pre-TOAE bivalve assemblage by a smaller, post-TOAE assemblage occurred, while in the Cleveland Basin, the inoceramid Pseudomytiloides dubius experienced the Lilliput effect. Ammonoids, having already experienced a major morphological bottleneck thanks to the Gibbosus Event, about a million years before the Toarcian extinction, suffered further losses in the Early Toarcian diversity collapse. Belemnite richness in the northwestern Tethys dropped during the PTo-E but slightly increased across the TOAE. Belemnites underwent a major change in habitat preference from cold, deep waters to warm, shallow waters. Their average rostrum size also increased, though this trend heavily varied depending on the lineage of belemnites. The Toarcian extinction was unbelievably catastrophic for corals; 90.9% of all Tethyan coral species and 49% of all genera were wiped out. Calcareous nannoplankton that lived in the deep photic zone suffered, with the decrease in abundance of the taxon Mitrolithus jansae used as an indicator of shoaling of the oxygen minimum zone in the Tethys and the Hispanic Corridor. The biota of the Paris Basin suffered a particularly severe nannofossil crisis. Other affected invertebrate groups included echinoderms, radiolarians, dinoflagellates, and foraminifera. Trace fossils, an indicator of bioturbation and ecological diversity, became highly undiverse following the TOAE.

Carbonate platforms collapsed during both the PTo-E and the TOAE. Enhanced continental weathering and nutrient runoff were the dominant drivers of carbonate platform decline in the PTo-E, whereas during the TOAE the main culprits were heightened storm activity and a decrease in seawater pH.

The recovery from the mass extinction among benthos commenced with the recolonisation of barren locales by opportunistic pioneer taxa. Benthic recovery was slow and sluggish, regularly set back by recurrent episodes of oxygen depletion that continued for hundreds of thousands of years after the main extinction interval. Evidence from the Cleveland Basin suggests it took ~7 Myr for the marine benthos to recover, on par with the Permian-Triassic extinction event. Many marine invertebrate taxa found in South America migrated through the Hispanic Corridor into European seas after the extinction event, aided in their dispersal by higher sea levels.

=== Marine vertebrates ===
The TOAE had relatively minor effects on marine reptiles, in stark contrast to its major impact on many clades of marine invertebrates. In fact, in the Southwest German Basin, ichthyosaur diversity was higher after the extinction interval, although this may be in part a sampling artefact resulting from a sparse Pliensbachian marine vertebrate fossil record. However, amidst the hyperthermal warmth of the latter half of the Toarcian in the TOAE's aftermath, plesiosaurids, microcleidids, leptonectids, temnodontosaurids, and basal parvipelvians vanished. Thalattosuchians appear to have rapidly radiated after the TOAE.

=== Terrestrial animals ===
The TOAE is suggested to have caused the extinction of various clades of dinosaurs, including coelophysids, dilophosaurids, and many basal sauropodomorph clades, as a consequence of the remodelling of terrestrial ecosystems caused by global climate change. Some heterodontosaurids and thyreophorans also perished in the extinction event. In the wake of the extinction event, many derived clades of ornithischians, sauropods, and theropods emerged, with most of these post-extinction clades greatly increasing in size relative to dinosaurs before the TOAE. Eusauropods were propelled to ecological dominance after their survival of the Toarcian cataclysm. Megalosaurids experienced a diversification event in the latter part of the Toarcian that was possibly a post-extinction radiation that filled niches vacated by the mass death of the Early Toarcian extinction. Insects may have experienced blooms as fish moved en masse to surface waters to escape anoxia and then died in droves due to limited resources.

=== Terrestrial plants ===
The volcanogenic extinction event initially impacted terrestrial ecosystems more severely than marine ones. A shift towards a low diversity assemblage of cheirolepid conifers, cycads, and Cerebropollenites-producers adapted for high aridity from a higher diversity ecological assemblage of lycophytes, conifers, seed ferns, and wet-adapted ferns is observed in the palaeobotanical and palynological record over the course of the TOAE. The coincidence of the zenith of Classopolis and the decline of seed ferns and spore-producing plants with increased mercury loading implicates heavy metal poisoning as a key contributor to the floristic crisis during the Toarcian mass extinction. Phylogenetic evidence points to the TOAE as a major factor leading to the decline of otherwise dominant lineages, which concluded in long-term extinction and drastic floristic changes. Poisoning by mercury, along with chromium, copper, cadmium, arsenic, and lead, is speculated to be responsible for heightened rates of spore malformation and dwarfism concomitant with enrichments in all these toxic metals.

== Geologic effects ==
The TOAE was associated with widespread phosphatisation of marine fossils, believed to result from warming-induced increases in weathering, which increased phosphate flux into the ocean. This produced exquisitely preserved lagerstätten across the world, such as Ya Ha Tinda, Strawberry Bank, and the Posidonia Shale.

As is common during anoxic events, black shale deposition was widespread during the deoxygenation events of the Toarcian. Toarcian anoxia was responsible for the deposition of commercially extracted oil shales, particularly in China.

Enhanced hydrological cycling caused clastic sedimentation to accelerate during the TOAE; the increase in clastic sedimentation was synchronous with excursions in ^{187}Os/^{188}Os, ^{87}Sr/^{86}Sr, and δ^{44/40}Ca.

Additionally, the Toarcian was punctuated by intervals of extensive kaolinite enrichment. These kaolinites correspond to negative oxygen isotope excursions and high Mg/Ca ratios and are thus reflective of climatic warming events that characterised much of the Toarcian. Likewise, illitic/smectitic clays were also common during this hyperthermal perturbation.

== Palaeogeographic changes ==
The Intertropical Convergence Zone (ITCZ) migrated southwards across southern Gondwana, turning much of the region more arid. This aridification was interrupted, however, in the spinatus ammonite biozone and across the Pliensbachian-Toarcian boundary itself.

The large rise in sea levels resulting from the intense global warming led to the formation of the Laurasian Seaway, which enabled the flow of cool water low in salt content to flow into the Tethys Ocean from the Arctic Ocean. The opening of this seaway may have potentially acted as a mitigating factor that ameliorated to a degree the oppressively anoxic conditions that were widespread across much of the Tethys.

The enhanced hydrological cycle during early Toarcian warming caused lakes to expand. During the anoxic event, the Sichuan Basin was transformed into a giant lake, which was believed to be approximately thrice as large as modern-day Lake Superior. Lacustrine sediments deposited as a result of this lake's existence are represented by the Da'anzhai Member of the Ziliujing Formation. Roughly ~460 gigatons (Gt) of organic carbon and ~1,200 Gt of inorganic carbon were likely sequestered by this lake over the course of the TOAE.

== Comparison with present global warming ==
The TOAE and the Palaeocene-Eocene Thermal Maximum have been proposed as analogues to modern anthropogenic global warming based on the comparable quantity of greenhouse gases released into the atmosphere in all three events. Some researchers argue that evidence for a major increase in Tethyan tropical cyclone intensity during the TOAE suggests that a similar increase in magnitude of tropical storms is bound to occur as a consequence of present climate change.

== See also ==
- Weissert Event
- Selli Event
- Bonarelli Event
