= Istituto Lombardo Accademia di Scienze e Lettere =

Italian academy founded by Napoleon

Coordinates: 41°53′36″N 12°28′00″E

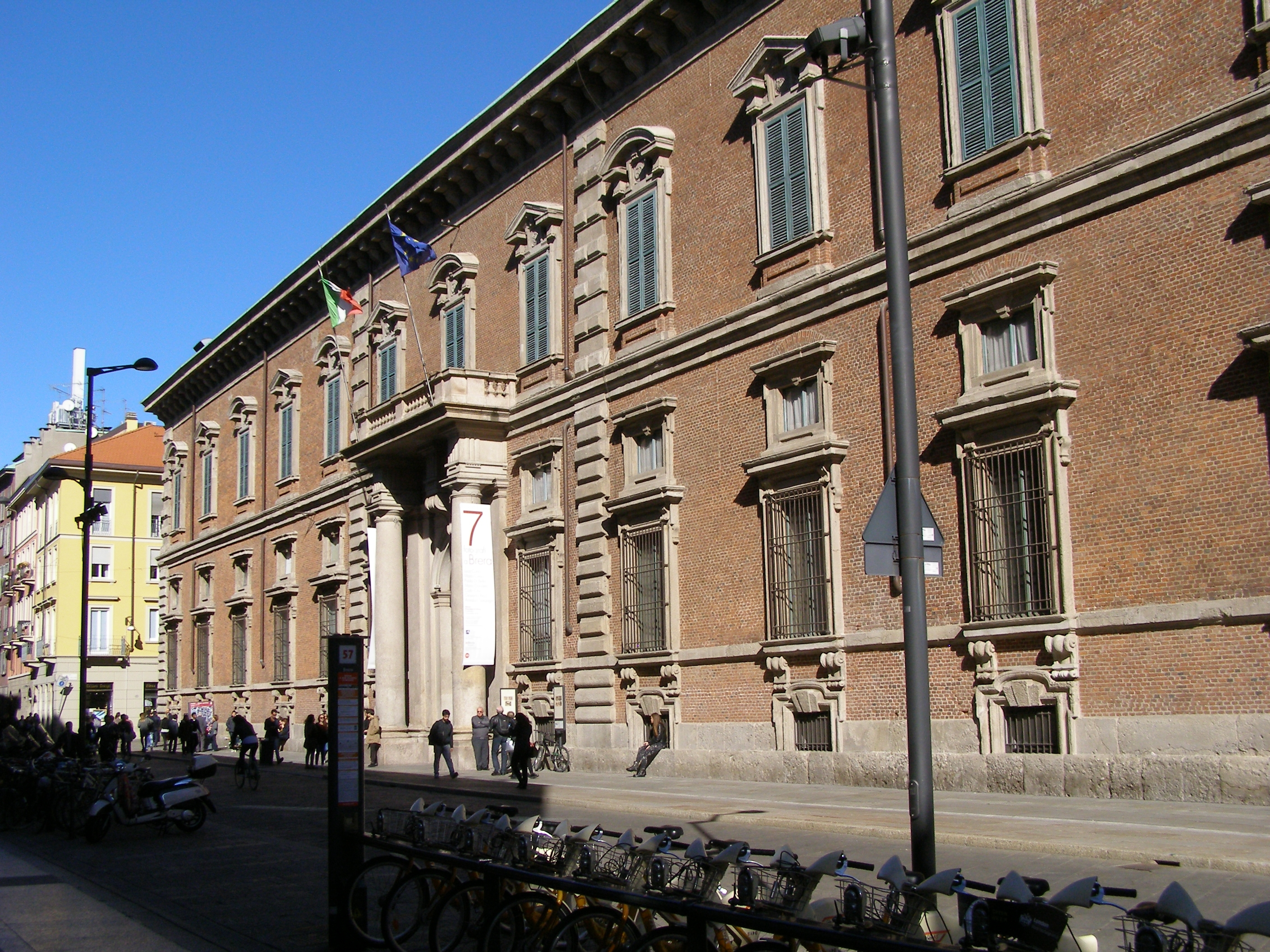
- Established: 1797
- Location: Milan, Italy
- Language: Italian

The Istituto Lombardo Accademia di Scienze e Lettere is an Italian academy founded by Napoleon in 1797. At the time of the foundation the Istituto was an institution of the Cisalpine Republic and its name was Istituto Nazionale della Repubblica Cisalpina.

The first location of the Istituto was Bologna and the academy was bound to include no more than 60 members. The first 31 were appointed by Napoleon in 1802 and the first president was Alessandro Volta, who started serving in 1803. The Istituto was concerned with Natural Sciences, Political Sciences and Arts.

Upon requests of its members, in 1810 Napoleon changed the name of the Istituto in Istituto Reale di Scienze, Lettere ed Arti. Its new location was Palazzo Brera in Milan, where it is still located nowadays. Additional sections were then added in Bologna, Verona, Padua and Venice.

At Napoleon's fall the Istituto passed under the administration of the Austrian government and then, since 1859 until 1935, under the administration of the Italian government. From 1935 the Istituto is a private no profit association.

In 1959 Istituto Lombardo moved to a new location, Palazzo Landriani, where are now located the library and the archive, many storages and the offices, but maintained its historical Sala Adunanze (the conference room) and some storages in Palazzo Brera.

== See also ==
- International Giovanni Sacchi Landriani Prize
