= KYR =

KYR or kyr refers to:

- kyr, a kiloyear, a millennium
- Kyrgyzstan, UNDP country code
- kyr, ISO 639-3 code for Kuruaya language
- Robert Kyr, an American composer, writer, and filmmaker
