= Carbonate–silicate cycle =

Geochemical transformation of silicate rocks

This figure describes the geological aspects and processes of the carbonate silicate cycle, within the long-term carbon cycle.

The carbonate–silicate geochemical cycle, also known as the inorganic carbon cycle, describes the long-term transformation of silicate rocks to carbonate rocks by weathering and sedimentation, and the transformation of carbonate rocks back into silicate rocks by metamorphism and volcanism. Carbon dioxide is removed from the atmosphere during burial of weathered minerals and returned to the atmosphere through volcanism. On million-year time scales, the carbonate-silicate cycle is a key factor in controlling Earth's climate because it regulates carbon dioxide levels and therefore global temperature.

The rate of weathering is sensitive to factors that change how much land is exposed. These factors include sea level, topography, lithology, and vegetation changes. Furthermore, these geomorphic and chemical changes have worked in tandem with solar forcing, whether due to orbital changes or stellar evolution, to determine the global surface temperature. Additionally, the carbonate-silicate cycle has been considered a possible solution to the faint young Sun paradox.

== Overview of the cycle ==
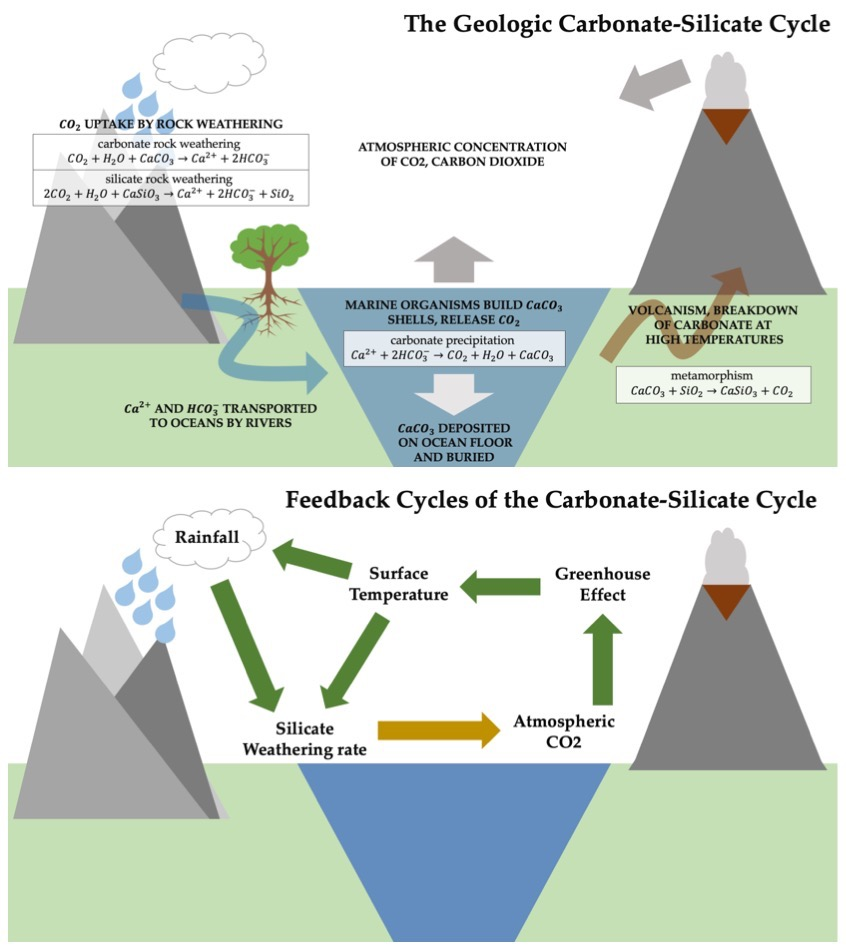
This schematic shows the relationship between the different physical and chemical processes that make up the carbonate-silicate cycle.

The carbonate-silicate cycle is the primary control on carbon dioxide levels over long timescales. It can be seen as a branch of the carbon cycle, which also includes the organic carbon cycle, in which biological processes convert carbon dioxide and water into organic matter and oxygen via photosynthesis.

=== Physical and chemical processes ===
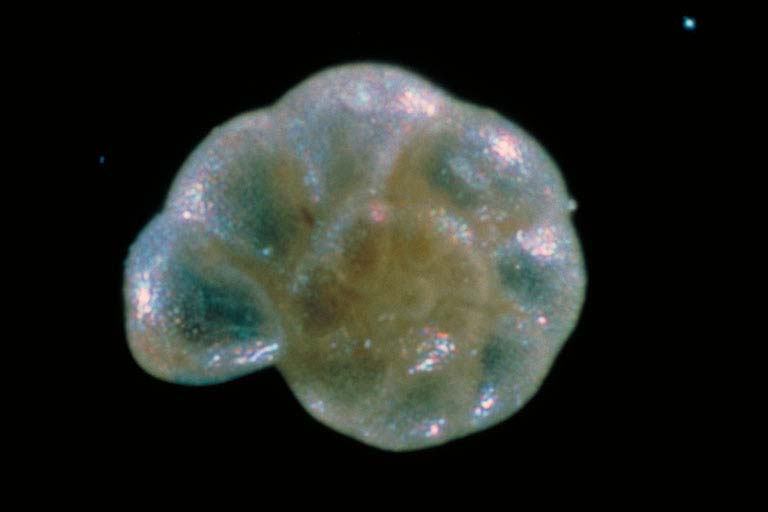
Microscopic shells of Foraminifera found in sediment cores may be used to determine past climate conditions including ocean temperatures and aspects of atmospheric chemistry.

The inorganic cycle begins with the production of carbonic acid (H_{2}CO_{3}) from rainwater and gaseous carbon dioxide. Due to this process, normal rain has a pH of around 5.6. Carbonic acid is a weak acid, but over long timescales, it can dissolve silicate rocks (as well as carbonate rocks). Most of the Earth's crust (and mantle) is composed of silicates. These substances break down into dissolved ions as a result. For example, calcium silicate (CaSiO_{3}), or wollastonite, reacts with carbon dioxide and water to yield a calcium ion, Ca^{2+}, a bicarbonate ion, HCO_{3}^{−}, and dissolved silica. This reaction structure is representative of general silicate weathering of calcium silicate minerals. The chemical pathway is as follows:

$$\ce{2CO2 + H2O + CaSiO3 -> Ca^2+ + 2HCO3- + SiO2}$$

River runoff carries these products to the ocean, where marine calcifying organisms use Ca^{2+} and HCO_{3}^{−} to build their shells and skeletons, a process called carbonate precipitation:

$$\ce{Ca^2+ + 2HCO3- -> CaCO3 + CO2 + H2O}$$

Two molecules of CO_{2} are required for silicate rock weathering; marine calcification releases one molecule back to the atmosphere. The calcium carbonate (CaCO_{3}) contained in shells and skeletons sinks after the marine organism dies and is deposited on the ocean floor.

The final stage of the process involves the movement of the seafloor. At subduction zones, the carbonate sediments are buried and forced back into the mantle. Some carbonate may be carried deep into the mantle where high pressure and temperature conditions allow it to combine metamorphically with SiO_{2} to form CaSiO_{3} and CO_{2}, which is released from the interior into the atmosphere via volcanism, thermal vents in the ocean, or soda springs, which are natural springs that contain carbon dioxide gas or soda water:

$$\ce{CaCO3  +  SiO2 -> CaSiO3  +  CO2}$$

This final step returns the second CO_{2} molecule to the atmosphere and closes the inorganic carbon budget. 99.6% of all carbon on Earth (equating to roughly 10^{8} billion tons of carbon) is sequestered in the longterm rock reservoir. And essentially all carbon has spent time in the form of carbonate. By contrast, only 0.002% of carbon exists in the biosphere.

=== Feedbacks ===
Changes to the surface of the planet, such as an absence of volcanoes or higher sea levels, which would reduce the amount of land surface exposed to weathering can change the rates at which different processes in this cycle take place. Over tens to hundreds of millions of years, carbon dioxide levels in the atmosphere may vary due to natural perturbations in the cycle but even more generally, it serves as a critical negative feedback loop between carbon dioxide levels and climate changes. For example, if CO_{2} builds up in the atmosphere, the greenhouse effect will serve to increase the surface temperature, which will in turn increase the rate of rainfall and silicate weathering, which will remove carbon from the atmosphere. In this way, over long timescales, the carbonate-silicate cycle has a stabilizing effect on the Earth's climate, which is why it has been called the Earth's thermostat.

== Changes through Earth history ==
Aspects of the carbonate-silicate cycle have changed through Earth history as a result of biological evolution and tectonic changes. Generally, the formation of carbonates has outpaced that of silicates, effectively removing carbon dioxide from the atmosphere. The advent of carbonate biomineralization near the Precambrian-Cambrian boundary would have allowed more efficient removal of weathering products from the ocean. Biological processes in soils can significantly increase weathering rates. Plants produce organic acids that increase weathering. These acids are secreted by root and mycorrhizal fungi, as well as microbial plant decay. Root respiration and oxidation of organic soil matter also produce carbon dioxide, which is converted to carbonic acid, which increases weathering.

Tectonics can induce changes in the carbonate-silicate cycle. For example, the uplift of major mountain ranges, such as Himalayas and the Andes, is thought to have initiated the Late Cenozoic Ice Age due to increased rates of silicate weathering and draw down of carbon dioxide. Seafloor weather is linked both to solar luminosity and carbon dioxide concentration. However, it presented a challenge to modelers who have tried to relate the rate of outgassing and subduction to the related rates of seafloor change. Proper, uncomplicated proxy data is difficult to attain for such questions. For example, sediment cores, from which scientists can deduce past sea levels, are not ideal because sea levels change as a result of more than just seafloor adjustment. Recent modeling studies have investigated the role of seafloor weathering on the early evolution of life, showing that relatively fast seafloor creation rates worked to draw down carbon dioxide levels to a moderate extent.

Observations of so-called deep time indicate that Earth has a relatively insensitive rock weathering feedback, allowing for large temperature swings. With about twice as much carbon dioxide in the atmosphere, paleoclimate records show that global temperatures reached up to 5 to 6 °C higher than current temperatures. However, other factors such as changes in orbital/solar forcing contribute to global temperature change in the paleo-record.

Human emissions of CO_{2} have been steadily increasing in a very short amount of time. Excess carbon in the atmosphere that is dissolved in seawater can alter the rates of carbonate-silicate cycle. Dissolved CO_{2} may react with water to form bicarbonate ions, HCO_{3}^{−}, and hydrogen ions, H^{+}. These hydrogen ions quickly react with carbonate, CO_{3}^{2-} to produce more bicarbonate ions and reduce the available carbonate ions, which presents an obstacle to the carbon carbonate precipitation process. Put differently, 30% of excess carbon emitted into the atmosphere is absorbed by the oceans. Higher concentrations of carbon dioxide in the oceans work to push the carbonate precipitation process in the opposite direction (to the left), producing less CaCO_{3}. This process, which harms shell-building organisms, is called ocean acidification.

== The cycle on other planets ==
One should not assume that a carbonate-silicate cycle would appear on all terrestrial planets. To begin, the carbonate-silicate cycle requires the presence of a water cycle. It therefore breaks down at the inner edge of the Solar System's habitable zone. Even if a planet starts out with liquid water on the surface, if it becomes too warm, it will undergo a runaway greenhouse, losing surface water. Without the requisite rainwater, no weathering will occur to produce carbonic acid from gaseous CO_{2}. Furthermore, at the outer edge, CO_{2} may condense, consequently reducing the greenhouse effect and reducing the surface temperature. As a result, the atmosphere would collapse into polar caps.

Mars is such a planet. Located at the edge of the solar system's habitable zone, its surface is too cold for liquid water to form without a greenhouse effect. With its thin atmosphere, Mars' mean surface temperature is 210 K (−63 °C). In attempting to explain topographical features resembling fluvial channels, despite seemingly insufficient incoming solar radiation, some have suggested that a cycle similar to Earth's carbonate-silicate cycle could have existed – similar to a retreat from Snowball Earth periods. It has been shown using modeling studies that gaseous CO_{2} and H_{2}O acting as greenhouse gases could not have kept Mars warm during its early history when the Sun was fainter because CO_{2} would condense out into clouds. Even though CO_{2} clouds do not reflect in the same way that water clouds do on Earth, it could not have had much of a carbonate-silicate cycle in the past.

By contrast, Venus is located at the inner edge of the habitable zone and has a mean surface temperature of 737 K (464 °C). After losing its water by photodissociation and hydrogen escape, Venus stopped removing carbon dioxide from its atmosphere, and began instead to build it up, and experience a runaway greenhouse effect.

On tidally locked exoplanets, the location of the substellar point will dictate the release of carbon dioxide from the lithosphere.

== See also ==
- Biological pump
- Carbon cycle
- Carbonate compensation depth
- Reverse weathering
- Daisyworld
- Gaia hypothesis
- Runaway greenhouse effect
- Major ice ages
- Snowball Earth
- Lake Nyos
- Ocean acidification
- Faint young Sun paradox
