= Cenomanian–Turonian boundary event =

Anoxic extinction event in the Cretaceous period

System/ Period	Series/ Epoch	Stage/ Age	Age (Ma)	
Paleogene	Paleocene	Danian	younger	
Cretaceous	Upper/ Late	Maastrichtian	66.0	72.1
Cretaceous	Upper/ Late	Campanian	72.1	83.6
Cretaceous	Upper/ Late	Santonian	83.6	86.3
Cretaceous	Upper/ Late	Coniacian	86.3	89.8
Cretaceous	Upper/ Late	Turonian	89.8	93.9
Cretaceous	Upper/ Late	Cenomanian	93.9	100.5
Cretaceous	Lower/ Early	Albian	100.5	113.2
Cretaceous	Lower/ Early	Aptian	113.2	121.4
Cretaceous	Lower/ Early	Barremian	121.4	125.77
Cretaceous	Lower/ Early	Hauterivian	125.77	132.6
Cretaceous	Lower/ Early	Valanginian	132.6	137.05
Cretaceous	Lower/ Early	Berriasian	137.05	≈143.0
Jurassic	Upper/ Late	Tithonian	older	
Subdivision of the Cretaceous system according to the ICS, as of 2024.

The Cenomanian–Turonian boundary event, also known as the Cenomanian–Turonian extinction, Cenomanian–Turonian Oceanic Anoxic Event (OAE 2), and referred to also as the Bonarelli Event or Level, was an anoxic extinction event in the Cretaceous period. The Cenomanian–Turonian oceanic anoxic event is considered to be the most recent truly global oceanic anoxic event in Earth's geologic history. There was a large carbon cycle disturbance during this time period, signified by a large positive carbon isotope excursion. However, apart from the carbon cycle disturbance, there were also large disturbances in the ocean's nitrogen, oxygen, phosphorus, sulfur, and iron cycles.

== Background ==
The Cenomanian and Turonian stages were first noted by D'Orbigny between 1843 and 1852. The global type section for this boundary is located in the Bridge Creek Limestone Member of the Greenhorn Formation near Pueblo, Colorado, which are bedded with the Milankovitch orbital signature. Here, a positive carbon-isotope event is clearly shown, although none of the characteristic, organic-rich black shale is present. It has been estimated that the isotope shift lasted approximately 850,000 years longer than the black shale event, which may be the cause of this anomaly in the Colorado type section. A significantly expanded OAE2 interval from southern Tibet documents a complete, more detailed, and finer-scale structures of the positive carbon isotope excursion that contains multiple shorter-term carbon isotope stages amounting to a total duration of 820 ±25 ka.

The level is also known as the Bonarelli Event because of 1-to-2-metre (3 ft 3 in to 6 ft 7 in) layer of thick, black shale that marks the boundary and was first studied by Guido Bonarelli in 1891. It is characterized by interbedded black shales, chert and radiolarian sands and is estimated to span a 400,000-year interval. Planktonic foraminifera do not exist in this Bonarelli Level, and the presence of radiolarians in this section indicates relatively high productivity and an availability of nutrients. In the Western Interior Seaway, the Cenomanian-Turonian boundary event is associated with the Benthonic Zone, characterised by a higher density of benthic foraminifera relative to planktonic foraminifera, although the timing of the appearance of the Benthonic Zone is not uniformly synchronous with the onset of the oceanic anoxic event and is thus cannot be used to consistently demarcate its beginning.

== Timeline ==
Selby et al. in 2009 concluded the OAE 2 occurred approximately 91.5 ± 8.6 Ma, though estimates published by Leckie et al. (2002) are given as 93–94 Ma. The Cenomanian-Turonian boundary has been refined in 2012 to 93.9 ± 0.15 Ma. The total duration of OAE2 has been estimated at 0.9 Myr, 0.82 ± 0.025 Myr, or 0.71 ± 0.17 Myr. At high latitudes, the event lasted for a shorter time: only ~600 kyr.

Biodiversity patterns of planktic foraminifera indicate that the Cenomanian–Turonian extinction occurred in five phases. Phase I, which took place from 313,000 to 55,000 years before the onset of the anoxic event, witnessed a stratified water column and high planktonic foraminiferal diversity, suggesting a stable marine environment. Phase II, characterised by significant environmental perturbations, lasted from 55,000 years before OAE2 until its onset and witnessed a decline in rotaliporids and heterohelicids, a zenith of schackoinids and hedbergellids, a 'large form eclipse' during which foraminifera exceeding 150 microns disappeared, and the start of a trend of dwarfism among many foraminifera. This phase also saw an enhanced oxygen minimum zone and increased productivity in surface waters. Phase III lasted for 100,000 to 900,000 years and was coincident with the Bonarelli Level's deposition and exhibited extensive proliferation of radiolarians, indicative of extremely eutrophic conditions. Phase IV lasted for around 35,000 years and was most notable for the increase in the abundance of hedbergellids and schackoinids, being extremely similar to Phase II, with the main difference being that rotaliporids were absent from Phase IV. Phase V was a recovery interval lasting 118,000 years and marked the end of the 'large form eclipse' that began in Phase II; heterohelicids and hedbergellids remained in abundance during this phase, pointing to continued environmental disturbance during this phase.

== Causes ==
=== Climate change ===
Earth pronouncedly warmed just before the beginning of OAE2. The Cenomanian–Turonian interval represents one of the hottest intervals of the entire Phanerozoic eon, and it boasted the highest carbon dioxide concentrations of the Cretaceous period. Even before OAE2, during the late Cenomanian, tropical sea surface temperatures (SSTs) were very warm, about 27-29 °C. The onset of OAE2 was concurrent with a 4-5 °C rise in shelf sea temperatures. Mean tropical SSTs during OAE2 have been conservatively estimated to have been at least 30 °C, but may have reached as high as 36 °C. Minimum SSTs in mid-latitude oceans were >20 °C. This exceptional warmth persisted until the Turonian–Coniacian boundary.

One possible cause of this hothouse was sub-oceanic volcanism. During the middle of the Cretaceous period, the rate of crustal production reached a peak, which may have been related to the rifting of the newly formed Atlantic Ocean. It was also caused by the widespread melting of hot mantle plumes under the ocean crust, at the base of the lithosphere, which may have resulted in the thickening of the oceanic crust in the Pacific and Indian Oceans. The resulting volcanism would have sent large quantities of carbon dioxide into the atmosphere, leading to an increase in global temperatures. Greenhouse gas release was further increased by the degassing of organic-rich sediments intruded into by volcanic sills. Several independent events related to large igneous provinces (LIPs) occurred around the time of OAE2. A multitude of LIPs were active during OAE2: the Madagascar, Caribbean, Gorgona, Ontong Java, and High Arctic LIPs. The abundance of LIPs at this time reflects a major overturning in mantle convection. Trace metals such as chromium (Cr), scandium (Sc), copper (Cu) and cobalt (Co) have been found at the Cenomanian–Turonian boundary, which suggests that an LIP could have been one of the main basic causes involved in the contribution of the event. The timing of the peak in trace metal concentration coincides with the middle of the anoxic event, suggesting that the effects of the LIPs may have occurred during the event, but may not have initiated the event. Other studies linked the lead (Pb) isotopes of OAE-2 to the Caribbean–Colombian and the Madagascar LIPs. An osmium isotope excursion coeval with OAE2 strongly suggests submarine volcanism as its cause; in the Pacific, an unradiogenic osmium spike began about 350 kyr before the onset of OAE2 and terminated around 240 kyr after OAE2's beginning; the osmium isotope data from a highly expanded OAE2 interval in southern Tibet show multiple osmium excursions with the most pronounced one lagging the onset of OAE2 by ≈50 kyr that was probably related to the ocean connectivity change at ~94.5 Ma. Osmium data also reveal that three distinct pulses of intense volcanism occurred ~60, ~270, and ~400 kyr after OAE2's onset, prolonging it. Positive neodymium isotope excursions provide additional indications of pervasive volcanism as a cause of OAE2. Enrichments in zinc further bolster and reinforce the existence of extensive hydrothermal volcanism, as do extreme negative δ^{53}Cr excursions. The absence of geographically widespread mercury (Hg) anomalies resulting from OAE2 has been suggested to be because of the limited dispersal range of this heavy metal by submarine volcanism. A modeling study performed in 2011 confirmed that it is possible that a LIP may have initiated the event, as the model revealed that the peak amount of carbon dioxide degassing from volcanic LIP degassing could have resulted in more than 90 percent global deep-ocean anoxia.

Later on, when anoxia became widespread, the production of nitrous oxide, a greenhouse gas about 265 times more potent than carbon dioxide, drastically increased because of elevated nitrification and denitrification rates. This powerful positive feedback mechanism is what may have enabled extremely hot temperatures to persist in spite of the supercharged organic carbon burial associated with anoxic events.

==== Plenus Cool Event ====
Large-scale organic carbon burial acted as a negative feedback loop that partially mitigated the warming effects of volcanic discharge of carbon dioxide, resulting in the Plenus Cool Event during the Metoicoceras geslinianum European ammonite biozone. Global average temperatures fell to around 4 °C lower than they were pre-OAE2. Equatorial SSTs dropped by 2.5–5.5 °C. This cooling event was insufficient at completely stopping the rise in global temperatures. This negative feedback was ultimately overridden, as global temperatures continued to shoot up in sync with continued volcanic release of carbon dioxide following the Plenus Cool Event, although this theory has been criticised and the warming after the Plenus Cool Event attributed to decreased silicate weathering instead.

=== Ocean acidification ===
Within the oceans, the emission of SO_{2}, H_{2}S, CO_{2}, and halogens would have increased the acidity of the water, causing the dissolution of carbonate, and a further release of carbon dioxide. Evidence of ocean acidification can be gleaned from δ^{44/40}Ca increases coeval with the extinction event, as well as coccolith malformation and dwarfism. Lithologies characterised by low calcium carbonate concentrations predominated during intervals of carbonate compensation depth shoaling. Ocean acidification was exacerbated by a positive feedback loop of increased heterotrophic respiration in highly biologically productive waters, elevating seawater concentrations of carbon dioxide and further decreasing pH.

=== Anoxia and euxinia ===
When the volcanic activity declined, this run-away greenhouse effect would have likely been put into reverse. The increased CO_{2} content of the oceans could have increased organic productivity in the ocean surface waters. The consumption of this newly abundant organic life by aerobic bacteria would produce anoxia and mass extinction. An acceleration of the hydrological cycle induced by warmer global temperatures drove greater fluxes of nutrient runoff into the oceans, fuelling primary productivity. The global environmental disturbance that resulted in these conditions increased atmospheric and oceanic temperatures. Extreme hothouse conditions encouraged ocean stratification. Boundary sediments show an enrichment of trace elements, and contain elevated δ^{13}C values. The positive δ^{13}C excursion found at the Cenomanian-Turonian boundary is one of the main carbon isotope events of the Mesozoic. It represents one of the largest disturbances in the global carbon cycle from the past 110 million years. This δ^{13}C excursion indicates a significant increase in the burial rate of organic carbon, indicating the widespread deposition and preservation of organic carbon-rich sediments and that the ocean was depleted of oxygen at the time. Depletion of manganese in sediments corresponding to OAE2 provides additional strong evidence of severe bottom water oxygen depletion. An increase in the abundance of the planktonic foraminifer Heterohelix provides further evidence still of anoxia. The resulting elevated levels of carbon burial would account for the black shale deposition in the ocean basins. The proto-North Atlantic in particular was a hotbed of carbon burial during OAE2 as it was in later, less severe anoxic events. Though anoxia was prevalent throughout the interval, there were transient periods of reoxygenation during OAE2.

Sulphate reduction increased during OAE2, causing euxinia, a type of anoxia defined by sulphate reduction and hydrogen sulfide production, to occur during OAE2, as revealed by negative δ^{53}Cr excursions, positive δ^{98}Mo excursions, a drawdown of seawater molybdenum, and molecular biomarkers of green sulfur bacteria. Although euxinia was not uncommon in the latter part of the Cenomanian, it only expanded into the photic zone during OAE2 itself.

OAE2 began on the southern margins of the proto-North Atlantic, from where anoxia spread across the rest of the proto-North Atlantic and then into the Western Interior Seaway (WIS) and the epicontinental seas of the Western Tethys. Anoxic waters spread rapidly throughout the WIS due to marine transgression and a powerful cyclonic circulation resulting from an imbalance between precipitation in the north and evaporation in the south. Anoxia was especially intense in the eastern North Sea, evidenced by its very positive δ^{13}C values. Thanks to persistent upwelling, some marine regions, such as the South Atlantic, were able to remain partially oxygenated at least intermittently. Indeed, redox states of oceans vary geographically, bathymetrically and temporally during OAE2.

==== Milankovitch cycles ====
It has been hypothesised that the Cenomanian–Turonian boundary event occurred during a period of very low variability in Earth's insolation, which has been theorised to be the result of coincident nodes in all orbital parameters. Barring chaotic perturbations in Earth's and Mars' orbits, the simultaneous occurrence of nodes of orbital eccentricity, axial precession, and obliquity on Earth occurs approximately every 2.45 million years. Numerous other oceanic anoxic events occurred throughout the extremely warm greenhouse conditions of the Middle Cretaceous, and it has been suggested that these Middle Cretaceous ocean anoxic events occurred cyclically in accordance with orbital cycle patterns. The mid-Cenomanian Event (MCE), which occurred in the Rotalipora cushmani planktonic foraminifer biozone, has been argued to be another example supporting this hypothesis of regular oceanic anoxic events governed by Milankovitch cycles. The MCE took place approximately 2.4 million years before the Cenomanian-Turonian oceanic anoxic event, roughly at the time when an anoxic event would be expected to occur given such a cycle. Geochemical evidence from a sediment core in the Tarfaya Basin is indicative of the main positive carbon isotope excursion occurring during a prolonged eccentricity minimum. Carbon isotope shifts smaller in scale observed in this core likely reflected variability in obliquity. Ocean Drilling Program Site 1138 in the Kerguelen Plateau yields evidence of a 20,000 to 70,000 year periodicity in changes in sedimentation, suggesting that either obliquity or precession governed the large-scale burial of organic carbon. Within the OAE2 positive δ^{13}C excursion, short eccentricity scale carbon isotope variability is documented in a significantly expanded OAE2 interval from southern Tibet; periodic negative δ^{13}C excursions paced by the short eccentricity cycle are easily detectable in southwestern Utah too.

==== Enhanced phosphorus recycling ====
The phosphorus retention ability of seafloor sediments declined during OAE2, revealed by a decline in reactive phosphorus species within OAE2 sediments. The mineralisation of seafloor phosphorus into apatite was inhibited by the significantly lower pH of seawater and much warmer temperatures during the Cenomanian and Turonian compared to the present day, which meant that significantly more phosphorus was recycled back into ocean water after being deposited on the sea floor during this time. This would have intensified a positive feedback loop in which phosphorus is recycled faster into anoxic seawater compared to oxygen-rich water, which in turn fertilises the water, causes increased eutrophication, and further depletes the seawater of oxygen. The influx of volcanically erupted and chemically weathered sulfate into the ocean also inhibited phosphorus burial by increasing hydrogen sulfide production, which hinders the burial of phosphorus through sorption to iron oxyhydroxide phases. OAE2 may have occurred during a peak in a 5-6 Myr cycle governing phosphorus availability; at this and other peaks in this oscillation, an increase in chemical weathering would have increased the marine phosphorus inventory and sparked a positive feedback loop of increasing productivity, anoxia, and phosphorus recycling that was only ended by a negative feedback of increased atmospheric oxygenation and wildfire activity that decreased chemical weathering, a feedback which operated on a much longer timescale. Enhanced phosphorus recycling would have resulted in an abundance of nitrogen fixing bacteria, increasing the availability of yet another limiting nutrient and supercharging primary productivity through nitrogen fixation. The ratio of bioavailable nitrogen to bioavailable phosphorus, which is 16:1 in the present, fell precipitously as the ocean transitioned from being oxic and nitrate-dominated to anoxic and ammonium-dominated. A potent feedback loop of nitrogen fixation, productivity, deoxygenation, nitrogen removal, and phosphorus recycling was created. Bacterial hopanoids indicate populations of nitrogen fixing cyanobacteria were high during OAE2, providing a rich supply of nitrates and nitrites. Negative δ15N values reveal the dominance of ammonium through regenerative nutrient loops in the proto-North Atlantic.

==== Decreased sulfide oxidation ====
In the present day, sulfidic waters are generally prevented from spreading throughout the water column by the oxidation of sulfide with nitrate. However, during OAE2, the inventory of seawater nitrate was lower, meaning that chemolithoautotrophic oxidation of sulfides with nitrates was inefficient at preventing the spread of euxinia.

==== Sea level rise ====
A marine transgression in the latest Cenomanian resulted in an increase in average water depth, causing seawater to become less eutrophic in shallow, epicontinental seas. Turnovers in marine biota in such epicontinental seas have been suggested to be driven more so by changes in water depth rather than anoxia. Sea level rise also contributed to anoxia by transporting terrestrial plant matter from inundated lands seaward, providing an abundant source of sustenance for eutrophicating microorganisms.

== Geological effects ==
=== Phosphate deposition ===
A phosphogenic event occurred in the Bohemian Cretaceous Basin during the peak of oceanic anoxia. Phosphorus liberation in the pore water environment, several centimetres below the interface between seafloor sediments and the water column, enabled the precipitation of phosphate through biological mediation by microorganisms.

=== Increase in weathering ===
Strontium and calcium isotope ratios both indicate that silicate weathering increased over the course of OAE2. Because of its effectiveness as a carbon sink on geologic timescales, the uptick in sequestration of carbon dioxide by the lithosphere may have helped to stabilise global temperatures after global temperatures soared. Particularly so at high latitudes, where the increase in weatherability was very pronounced.

== Biotic effects ==
=== Changes in oceanic biodiversity and its implications ===
Although some early studies suggested the marine biodiversity decline observed during the Cenomanian–Turonian transition was not a real extinction but instead represented an artifact of preservation, recent work confirms that significant extinctions were experienced by vertebrates, invertebrates, and microbes.

The event brought about the extinction of the pliosaurs, and most ichthyosaurs. Coracoids of Maastrichtian age were once interpreted by some authors as belonging to ichthyosaurs, but these have since been interpreted as plesiosaur elements instead. Dolichosaurids became rare after OAE2, whereas mosasauroid diversity bloomed in its aftermath. Tethysuchians experienced a significant faunal turnover, and post-OAE2 tethysuchians tended to inhabit warmer environments compared to pre-OAE2 tethysuchians.

Although the cause is still uncertain, the result starved the Earth's oceans of oxygen for nearly half a million years, causing the extinction of approximately 27 percent of marine invertebrates, including certain planktic and benthic foraminifera, mollusks, bivalves, dinoflagellates and calcareous nannofossils. Planktonic foraminifera suffered from the expansion of oxygen minimum zones; those that dwelt in deeper waters were especially hard hit. In Whadi El Ghaib, a site in Sinai, Egypt, the foraminiferal community during OAE2 was low in diversity and dominated by taxa that were extremely tolerant of low salinity, anoxic water. In the southeastern Indian Ocean, off the coast of Australia, the planktonic foraminifer Microhedbergella was highly abundant, while Heterohelix thrived in reducing waters in the South Atlantic, as well as in the Chalk Sea. Benthic foraminifera suffered noticeable losses. The benthic foraminifera Gavelella berthelini and Lingulogavelinella globosa dominated during deoxygenated conditions in Poland. The alterations in diversity of various marine invertebrate species such as calcareous nannofossils are reflective and characteristic of oligotrophy and ocean warmth in an environment with short spikes of productivity followed by long periods of low fertility. A study performed in the Cenomanian–Turonian boundary of Wunstorf, Germany, reveal the uncharacteristic dominance of a calcareous nannofossil species, Watznaueria, present during the event. Unlike the Biscutum species, which prefer mesotrophic conditions and were generally the dominant species before and after the C/T boundary event; Watznaueria species prefer warm, oligotrophic conditions. In the Ohaba-Ponor section in Romania, the presence of Watznaueria barnesae indicates warm conditions, while the abundances of Biscutum constans, Zeugrhabdotus erectus, and Eprolithus floralis peak during cool intervals. Sites in Colorado, England, France, and Sicily show an inverse relationship between atmospheric carbon dioxide levels and the size of calcareous nannoplankton. Radiolarians also suffered heavy losses in OAE2, one of their highest diversity losses in the Cretaceous. Bivalves declined significantly in diversity during the leadup to the δ^{13}C_{org} peak of OAE2. Rudist bivalves suffered high extinction rates combined with low origination rates during OAE2. Ammonoids suffered during the crisis, though anoxia was not the main driver of their declines in diversity. Ammonoid diversity losses were primarily concentrated in the seas around Europe; elsewhere, they were negligibly affected.

The diversity of trace fossils sharply plummeted during the beginning of the Cenomanian–Turonian boundary event. The recovery interval after the anoxic event's conclusion features an abundance of Planolites and is characterised overall by a high degree of bioturbation.

At the time, there were also peak abundances of the green algal groups Botryococcus and prasinophytes, coincident with pelagic sedimentation. The abundances of these algal groups are strongly related to the increase of both the oxygen deficiency in the water column and the total content of organic carbon. The evidence from these algal groups suggest that there were episodes of halocline stratification of the water column during the time. A species of freshwater dinocyst—Bosedinia—was also found in the rocks dated to the time and these suggest that the oceans had reduced salinity.

=== Changes in terrestrial biodiversity ===
No major change in terrestrial ecosystems is known to have been synchronous with the marine transgression associated with OAE2, although the loss of freshwater floodplain habitat has been speculated to have possibly resulted in the demise of some freshwater taxa, and some workers have linked OAE2 to the contemporaneous disappearance of various dinosaur lineages such as the spinosaurs and carcharodontosaurs. In fossiliferous rocks in southwestern Utah, a local extirpation of some metatherians and brackish water vertebrates is associated with the later marine regression following OAE2 in the Turonian. Among mammals, diversity changes likely reflect shifting ranges and changes in ecology rather than a true extinction event. Whatever the nature and magnitude of terrestrial extinctions at or near the Cenomanian-Turonian boundary was, it was most likely caused mainly by other factors than eustatic sea level fluctuations. The effect of the ecological crisis on terrestrial plants has been concluded to have been inconsequential, in contrast to extinction events driven by terrestrial large igneous provinces. However, while terrestrial plants did persist even during the exceptional warmth, the Plenus Cool Event facilitated a notable expansion of angiosperm-dominated savanna ecosystems.

== See also ==
- Biodiversity of the Cenomanian and Turonian
  - Cenomanian life
  - Turonian life
  - Cenomanian extinctions
  - Turonian extinctions
- Extinction event
- Timeline of extinctions in the Holocene
  - Toarcian turnover
  - Cretaceous–Paleogene extinction event
