= Anoxic event =

Historic oxygen depletion events in Earth's oceans

An anoxic event describes a period wherein large expanses of Earth's oceans were depleted of dissolved oxygen (O_{2}), creating toxic, euxinic (anoxic and sulfidic) waters. Although anoxic events have not happened for millions of years, the geologic record shows that they happened many times in the past. Anoxic events coincided with several mass extinctions and may have contributed to them. These mass extinctions include some that geobiologists use as time markers in biostratigraphic dating. On the other hand, there are widespread, various black-shale beds from the mid-Cretaceous which indicate anoxic events but are not associated with mass extinctions. Many geologists believe oceanic anoxic events are strongly linked to the slowing of ocean circulation, climatic warming, and elevated levels of greenhouse gases. Researchers have proposed enhanced volcanism (the release of CO_{2}) as the "central external trigger for euxinia."

Human activities in the Holocene epoch, such as the release of nutrients from farms and sewage, cause relatively small-scale dead zones around the world. British oceanologist and atmospheric scientist Andrew Watson says full-scale ocean anoxia would take "thousands of years to develop." The idea that modern climate change could lead to such an event is referred to as Kump's hypothesis.

== Background ==
The concept of the oceanic anoxic event (OAE) was first proposed in 1976 by Seymour Schlanger and geologist Hugh Jenkyns and arose from discoveries made by the Deep Sea Drilling Project (DSDP) in the Pacific Ocean. The finding of black, carbon-rich shales in Cretaceous sediments that had accumulated on submarine volcanic plateaus (e.g. Shatsky Rise, Manihiki Plateau), coupled with their identical age to similar, cored deposits from the Atlantic Ocean and known outcrops in Europe—particularly in the geological record of the otherwise limestone-dominated Apennines chain in Italy—led to the observation that these widespread, similarly distinct strata recorded very unusual, oxygen-depleted conditions in the world's oceans spanning several discrete periods of geological time.

Modern sedimentological investigations of these organic-rich sediments typically reveal the presence of fine laminations undisturbed by bottom-dwelling fauna, indicating anoxic conditions on the seafloor believed to coincide with a low-lying poisonous layer of hydrogen sulfide, H_{2}S. Furthermore, detailed organic geochemical studies have recently revealed the presence of molecules (so-called biomarkers) that derive from both purple sulfur bacteria and green sulfur bacteria—organisms that required both light and free hydrogen sulfide (H_{2}S), illustrating that anoxic conditions extended high into the photic upper-water column.

This is a recent understanding, the puzzle having been pieced slowly together in the last three decades. The handful of known and suspected anoxic events have been tied geologically to large-scale production of the world's oil reserves in worldwide bands of black shale in the geologic record.

=== Euxinia ===
Anoxic events with euxinic (anoxic, sulfidic) conditions have been linked to extreme episodes of volcanic outgassing. Volcanism contributed to the buildup of CO_{2} in the atmosphere and increased global temperatures, causing an accelerated hydrological cycle that introduced nutrients into the oceans (stimulating planktonic productivity). These processes potentially acted as a trigger for euxinia in restricted basins where water-column stratification could develop. Under anoxic to euxinic conditions, oceanic phosphate is not retained in sediment and could hence be released and recycled, aiding perpetual high productivity.

== Mechanism ==
Temperatures throughout the Jurassic and Cretaceous are generally thought to have been relatively warm, and consequently dissolved oxygen levels in the ocean were lower than today—making anoxia easier to achieve. However, more specific conditions are required to explain the short-period (less than a million years) oceanic anoxic events. Two hypotheses, and variations upon them, have proved most durable.

One hypothesis suggests that the anomalous accumulation of organic matter relates to its enhanced preservation under restricted and poorly oxygenated conditions, which themselves were a function of the particular geometry of the ocean basin: such a hypothesis, although readily applicable to the young and relatively narrow Cretaceous Atlantic (which could be likened to a large-scale Black Sea, only poorly connected to the World Ocean), fails to explain the occurrence of coeval black shales on open-ocean Pacific plateaus and shelf seas around the world. There are suggestions, again from the Atlantic, that a shift in oceanic circulation was responsible, where warm, salty waters at low latitudes became hypersaline and sank to form an intermediate layer, at 500 to 1,000 m (1,640 to 3,281 ft) depth, with a temperature of 20 to 25 °C (68 to 77 °F).

The second hypothesis suggests that oceanic anoxic events record a major change in the fertility of the oceans that resulted in an increase in organic-walled plankton (including bacteria) at the expense of calcareous plankton such as coccoliths and foraminifera. Such an accelerated flux of organic matter would have expanded and intensified the oxygen minimum zone, further enhancing the amount of organic carbon entering the sedimentary record. Essentially this mechanism assumes a major increase in the availability of dissolved nutrients such as nitrate, phosphate and possibly iron to the phytoplankton population living in the illuminated layers of the oceans.

For such an increase to occur would have required an accelerated influx of land-derived nutrients coupled with vigorous upwelling, requiring major climate change on a global scale. Geochemical data from oxygen-isotope ratios in carbonate sediments and fossils, and magnesium/calcium ratios in fossils, indicate that all major oceanic anoxic events were associated with thermal maxima, making it likely that global weathering rates, and nutrient flux to the oceans, were increased during these intervals. Indeed, the reduced solubility of oxygen would lead to phosphate release, further nourishing the ocean and fuelling high productivity, hence a high oxygen demand—sustaining the event through a positive feedback.

Another way to explain anoxic events is that the Earth releases a huge volume of carbon dioxide during an interval of intense volcanism; global temperatures rise due to the greenhouse effect; global weathering rates and fluvial nutrient flux increase; organic productivity in the oceans increases; organic-carbon burial in the oceans increases (OAE begins); carbon dioxide is drawn down due to both burial of organic matter and weathering of silicate rocks (inverse greenhouse effect); global temperatures fall, and the ocean–atmosphere system returns to equilibrium (OAE ends).

In this way, an oceanic anoxic event can be viewed as the Earth's response to the injection of excess carbon dioxide into the atmosphere and hydrosphere. One test of this notion is to look at the age of large igneous provinces (LIPs), the extrusion of which would presumably have been accompanied by rapid effusion of vast quantities of volcanogenic gases such as carbon dioxide. The age of three LIPs (Karoo-Ferrar flood basalt, Caribbean large igneous province, Ontong Java Plateau) correlates well with that of the major Jurassic (early Toarcian) and Cretaceous (early Aptian and Cenomanian–Turonian) oceanic anoxic events, indicating that a causal link is feasible.

== Occurrence ==
Oceanic anoxic events most commonly occurred during periods of very warm climate characterized by high levels of carbon dioxide (CO_{2}) and mean surface temperatures probably in excess of 25 °C (77 °F). The Quaternary levels, the current period, are just 13 °C (55 °F) in comparison. Such rises in carbon dioxide may have been in response to a great outgassing of the highly flammable natural gas (methane) that some call an "oceanic burp". Vast quantities of methane are normally locked into the Earth's crust on the continental plateaus in one of the many deposits consisting of compounds of methane hydrate, a solid precipitated combination of methane and water much like ice. Because the methane hydrates are unstable, except at cool temperatures and high (deep) pressures, scientists have observed smaller outgassing events due to tectonic events. Studies suggest the huge release of natural gas could be a major climatological trigger, methane itself being a greenhouse gas many times more powerful than carbon dioxide. However, anoxia was also rife during the Hirnantian (late Ordovician) ice age.

Oceanic anoxic events have been recognized primarily from the already warm Cretaceous and Jurassic Periods, when numerous examples have been documented, but earlier examples have been suggested to have occurred in the late Triassic, Permian, Devonian (Kellwasser event), Ordovician and Cambrian.

The Paleocene–Eocene Thermal Maximum (PETM), which was characterized by a global rise in temperature and deposition of organic-rich shales in some shelf seas, shows many similarities to oceanic anoxic events.

Typically, oceanic anoxic events lasted for less than a million years, before a full recovery.

== Consequences ==
Oceanic anoxic events have had many important consequences. It is believed that they have been responsible for mass extinctions of marine organisms both in the Paleozoic and Mesozoic. The early Toarcian and Cenomanian-Turonian anoxic events correlate with the Toarcian and Cenomanian-Turonian extinction events of mostly marine life forms. Apart from possible atmospheric effects, many deeper-dwelling marine organisms could not adapt to an ocean where oxygen penetrated only the surface layers.

An economically significant consequence of oceanic anoxic events is the fact that the prevailing conditions in so many Mesozoic oceans has helped produce most of the world's petroleum and natural gas reserves. During an oceanic anoxic event, the accumulation and preservation of organic matter was much greater than normal, allowing the generation of potential petroleum source rocks in many environments across the globe. Consequently, some 70 percent of oil source rocks are Mesozoic in age, and another 15 percent date from the warm Paleogene: only rarely in colder periods were conditions favorable for the production of source rocks on anything other than a local scale.

=== Atmospheric effects ===
A model put forward by Lee Kump, Alexander Pavlov and Michael Arthur in 2005 suggests that oceanic anoxic events may have been characterized by upwelling of water rich in highly toxic hydrogen sulfide gas, which was then released into the atmosphere. This phenomenon would probably have poisoned plants and animals and caused mass extinctions. Furthermore, it has been proposed that the hydrogen sulfide rose to the upper atmosphere and attacked the ozone layer, which normally blocks the deadly ultraviolet radiation of the Sun. The increased UV radiation caused by this ozone depletion would have amplified the destruction of plant and animal life. Fossil spores from strata recording the Permian–Triassic extinction event show deformities consistent with UV radiation. This evidence, combined with fossil biomarkers of green sulfur bacteria, indicates that this process could have played a role in that mass extinction event, and possibly other extinction events. The trigger for these mass extinctions appears to be a warming of the ocean caused by a rise of carbon dioxide levels to about 1000 parts per million.

=== Ocean chemistry effects ===
Reduced oxygen levels are expected to lead to increased seawater concentrations of redox-sensitive metals. The reductive dissolution of iron–manganese oxyhydroxides in seafloor sediments under low-oxygen conditions would release those metals and associated trace metals. Sulfate reduction in such sediments could release other metals such as barium. When heavy-metal-rich anoxic deep water entered continental shelves and encountered increased O_{2} levels, precipitation of some of the metals, as well as poisoning of the local biota, would have occurred. In the late Silurian mid-Pridoli event, increases are seen in the Fe, Cu, As, Al, Pb, Ba, Mo and Mn levels in shallow-water sediment and microplankton; this is associated with a marked increase in the malformation rate in chitinozoans and other microplankton types, likely due to metal toxicity. Similar metal enrichment has been reported in sediments from the mid-Silurian Ireviken event.

== Anoxic events in Earth's history ==
=== Cretaceous ===
Sulfidic (or euxinic) conditions, which exist today in many water bodies from ponds to various land-surrounded mediterranean seas such as the Black Sea, were particularly prevalent in the Cretaceous Atlantic but also characterised other parts of the world ocean. In an ice-free sea of these supposed super-greenhouse worlds, oceanic waters were as much as 200 metres (660 ft) higher, in some eras. During the timespans in question, the continental plates are believed to have been well separated, and the mountains as they are known today were (mostly) future tectonic events—meaning the overall landscapes were generally much lower— and even the half super-greenhouse climates would have been eras of highly expedited water erosion carrying massive amounts of nutrients into the world oceans fuelling an overall explosive population of microorganisms and their predator species in the oxygenated upper layers.

Detailed stratigraphic studies of Cretaceous black shales from many parts of the world have indicated that two oceanic anoxic events (OAEs) were particularly significant in terms of their impact on the chemistry of the oceans, one in the early Aptian (~120 Ma), sometimes called the Selli Event (or OAE 1a) after the Italian geologist Raimondo Selli (1916–1983), and another at the Cenomanian–Turonian boundary (~93 Ma), also called the Bonarelli Event (or OAE2) after the Italian geologist Guido Bonarelli (1871–1951). OAE1a lasted for ~1.0 to 1.3 Myr. The duration of OAE2 is estimated to be ~820 kyr based on a high-resolution study of the significantly expanded OAE2 interval in southern Tibet, China.

- Insofar as the Cretaceous OAEs can be represented by type localities, it is the striking outcrops of laminated black shales within the vari-coloured claystones and pink and white limestones near the town of Gubbio in the Italian Apennines that are the best candidates.
- The 1-metre thick black shale at the Cenomanian–Turonian boundary that crops out near Gubbio is termed the 'Livello Bonarelli' after the scientist who first described it in 1891.

More minor oceanic anoxic events have been proposed for other intervals in the Cretaceous (in the Valanginian, Hauterivian, Albian and Coniacian–Santonian stages), but their sedimentary record, as represented by organic-rich black shales, appears more parochial, being dominantly represented in the Atlantic and neighbouring areas, and some researchers relate them to particular local conditions rather than being forced by global change.

=== Jurassic ===
The only oceanic anoxic event documented from the Jurassic took place during the early Toarcian (~183 Ma). Since no DSDP (Deep Sea Drilling Project) or ODP (Ocean Drilling Program) cores have recovered black shales of this age—there being little or no Toarcian ocean crust remaining—the samples of black shale primarily come from outcrops on land. These outcrops, together with material from some commercial oil wells, are found on all major continents and this event seems similar in kind to the two major Cretaceous examples.

=== Paleozoic ===
The Permian–Triassic extinction event, triggered by runaway CO_{2} from the Siberian Traps, was marked by ocean deoxygenation.

The boundary between the Ordovician and Silurian periods is marked by repetitive periods of anoxia, interspersed with normal, oxic conditions. In addition, anoxic periods are found during the Silurian. These anoxic periods occurred at a time of low global temperatures (although CO_{2} levels were high), in the midst of a glaciation.

Jeppsson (1990) proposes a mechanism whereby the temperature of polar waters determines the site of formation of downwelling water. If the high latitude waters are below 5 °C (41 °F), they will be dense enough to sink; as they are cool, oxygen is highly soluble in their waters, and the deep ocean will be oxygenated. If high latitude waters are warmer than 5 °C (41 °F), their density is too low for them to sink below the cooler deep waters. Therefore, thermohaline circulation can only be driven by salt-increased density, which tends to form in warm waters where evaporation is high. This warm water can dissolve less oxygen, and is produced in smaller quantities, producing a sluggish circulation with little deep water oxygen. The effect of this warm water propagates through the ocean, and reduces the amount of CO_{2} that the oceans can hold in solution, which makes the oceans release large quantities of CO_{2} into the atmosphere in a geologically short time (tens or thousands of years). The warm waters also initiate the release of clathrates, which further increases atmospheric temperature and basin anoxia. Similar positive feedbacks operate during cold-pole episodes, amplifying their cooling effects.

The periods with cold poles are termed "P-episodes" (short for primo), and are characterised by bioturbated deep oceans, a humid equator and higher weathering rates, and terminated by extinction events—for example, the Ireviken and Lau events. The inverse is true for the warmer, oxic "S-episodes" (secundo), where deep ocean sediments are typically graptolitic black shales. A typical cycle of secundo-primo episodes and ensuing event typically lasts around 3 Ma.

The duration of events is so long compared to their onset because the positive feedbacks must be overwhelmed. Carbon content in the ocean-atmosphere system is affected by changes in weathering rates, which in turn is dominantly controlled by rainfall. Because this is inversely related to temperature in Silurian times, carbon is gradually drawn down during warm (high CO_{2}) S-episodes, while the reverse is true during P-episodes. On top of this gradual trend is overprinted the signal of Milankovic cycles, which ultimately trigger the switch between P- and S- episodes.

These events become longer during the Devonian; the enlarging land plant biota probably acted as a large buffer to carbon dioxide concentrations.

The end-Ordovician Hirnantian event may alternatively be a result of algal blooms, caused by sudden supply of nutrients through wind-driven upwelling or an influx of nutrient-rich meltwater from melting glaciers, which by virtue of its fresh nature would also slow down oceanic circulation.

=== Archean and Proterozoic ===
It has been thought that through most of Earth's history, oceans were largely oxygen-deficient. During the Archean, euxinia was largely absent because of low availability of sulfate in the oceans, but during the Proterozoic, it would become more common.

Several anoxic events are known from the late Neoproterozoic, including one from the early Nama assemblage possibly coinciding with the first pulse of the end-Ediacaran extinction.

== See also ==
- Anoxic waters
- Canfield ocean
- Carbon dioxide
- Hydrogen sulfide
- Hypoxia (environmental) – for links to other articles dealing with environmental hypoxia or anoxia.
- Effects of climate change
- Meromictic lake
- Ocean acidification
- Ocean deoxygenation
- Shutdown of thermohaline circulation
