= Greenhouse and icehouse Earth =

Opposing climate states on Earth

Throughout Earth's climate history (Paleoclimate) its climate has fluctuated between two primary states: greenhouse and icehouse Earth. Both climate states last for millions of years and should not be confused with the much smaller glacial and interglacial periods, which occur as alternating phases within an icehouse period (known as an ice age) and tend to last less than one million years. There are several icehouse periods in Earth's climate history, namely the Huronian, Cryogenian, Andean-Saharan (also known as Early Paleozoic), Late Paleozoic, Cretaceous, and Late Cenozoic glaciations.

The main factors involved in changes of the paleoclimate are believed to be the concentration of atmospheric greenhouse gases such as carbon dioxide (CO_{2}) and, less importantly, methane (CH_{4}), changes in Earth's orbit, long-term changes in the solar constant, and oceanic and orogenic changes from tectonic plate dynamics. Greenhouse and icehouse periods have played key roles in the evolution of life on Earth by directly and indirectly forcing biotic adaptation and turnover at various spatial scales across time.

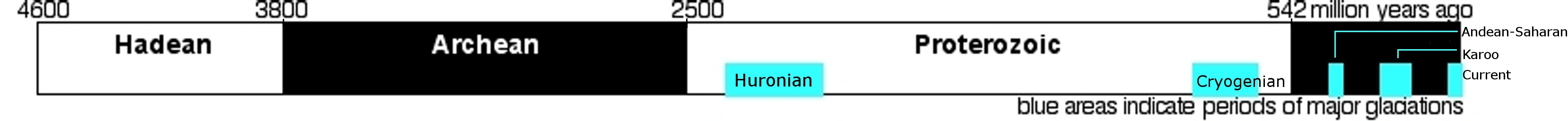
Timeline of the five known great icehouse periods, shown in blue. The periods in between depict greenhouse conditions.

== Greenhouse Earth ==
A "greenhouse Earth" is a period during which no continental glaciers exist anywhere on the planet. Additionally, the levels of carbon dioxide and other greenhouse gases (such as water vapor and methane) are high, and sea surface temperatures (SSTs) range from 28 °C (82.4 °F) in the tropics to 0 °C (32 °F) in the polar regions. Earth has been in a greenhouse state for about 85% of its history.

The state should not be confused with a hypothetical runaway greenhouse effect, which is an irreversible tipping point that corresponds to the ongoing runaway greenhouse effect on Venus. The IPCC states that "a 'runaway greenhouse effect'—analogous to [that of] Venus—appears to have virtually no chance of being induced by anthropogenic activities." Nor should it be confused with the "Hothouse Earth" of the most extreme projected extent of modern climate change.

=== Causes ===
There are several theories as to how a greenhouse Earth can come about. Geologic climate proxies indicate that there is a strong correlation between a greenhouse state and high CO_{2} levels. However, it is important to recognize that high CO_{2} levels have traditionally been interpreted as feedback to Earth's climate rather than as an independent driver, but geologic drivers of CO_{2} and climate change have been identified. Other phenomena have instead likely played a key role in influencing global climate by altering oceanic and atmospheric currents and increasing the net amount of solar radiation absorbed by Earth's atmosphere. Such phenomena may include but are not limited to tectonic shifts that result in the release of greenhouse gases (such as CO_{2} and CH_{4}) via volcanic activity. Volcanoes emit massive amounts of CO_{2} and methane into the atmosphere when they are active, which can trap enough heat to cause a greenhouse effect. In a greenhouse Earth, atmospheric concentrations of greenhouse gases like carbon dioxide (CO_{2}) and methane (CH_{4}) are higher, trapping solar energy in the atmosphere via the greenhouse effect. Methane, the main component of natural gas, is responsible for more than a third of the current global warming. While it has an 80-fold higher global warming potential than CO_{2} in the 20 years after it has been introduced into the atmosphere (due to a stronger greenhouse effect), it has a relatively short half life in the atmosphere of 10–20 years. An increase in the solar constant increases the net amount of solar energy absorbed into Earth's atmosphere, and changes in Earth's obliquity and eccentricity increase the net amount of solar radiation absorbed into Earth's atmosphere.

== Icehouse Earth ==
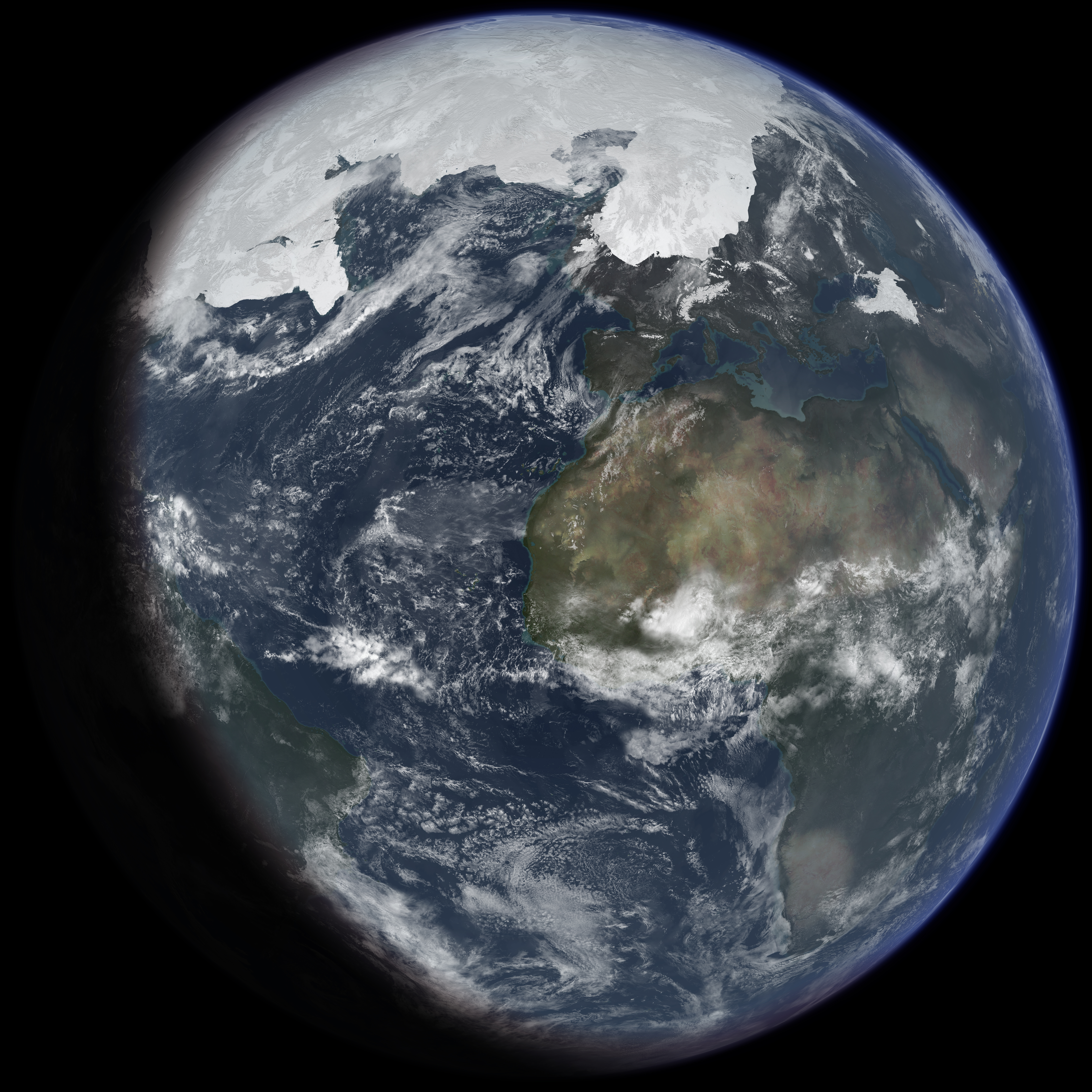
An illustration of ice age Earth at its glacial maximum

Earth is now in an icehouse state, and ice sheets are present in both poles simultaneously. Climatic proxies indicate that greenhouse gas concentrations tend to lower during an icehouse Earth. Similarly, global temperatures are also lower under icehouse conditions. Earth then fluctuates between glacial and interglacial periods, and the size and the distribution of continental ice sheets fluctuate dramatically. The fluctuation of the ice sheets results in changes in regional climatic conditions that affect the range and the distribution of many terrestrial and oceanic species.

On scales ranging from thousands to hundreds of millions of years, the Earth's climate has transitioned from warm to chilly intervals within life-sustaining ranges. There have been three periods of glaciation in the Phanerozoic Eon (Ordovician, Carboniferous, and Cenozoic), each lasting tens of millions of years and bringing ice down to sea level at mid-latitudes. During these frigid "icehouse" intervals, sea levels were generally lower, CO_{2} levels in the atmosphere were lower, net photosynthesis and carbon burial were lower, and oceanic volcanism was lower than during the alternate "greenhouse" intervals. Transitions from Phanerozoic icehouse to greenhouse intervals coincided with biotic crises or catastrophic extinction events, indicating complicated biosphere-hydrosphere feedbacks.^{[39]}

The glacial and interglacial periods tend to alternate in accordance with solar and climatic oscillation until Earth eventually returns to a greenhouse state.

Earth's current icehouse state is known as the Quaternary Ice Age and began approximately 2.58 million years ago. However, an ice sheet has existed in Antarctica for approximately 34 million years. Earth is now in a clement interglacial period that started approximately 11,800 years ago. Earth will likely phase into another interglacial period such as the Eemian, which occurred between 130,000 and 115,000 years ago, during which evidence of forest in North Cape, Norway, and hippopotamus in the Rhine and Thames Rivers can be observed. Earth is expected to continue to transition between glacial and interglacial periods until the cessation of the Quaternary Ice Age and will then enter another greenhouse state.

=== Causes ===
It is well established that there is strong correlation between low CO_{2} levels and an icehouse state, with evidence that the balance between geologic CO_{2} sources, weathering and carbon burial is responsible for secular transitions from Greenhouse and Icehouse climates and a clear role of ocean carbon storage changes in driving most of Quaternary CO_{2} and climate change. However, other factors such as solar, orbital and plate-tectonic forcing also influence climate and the global carbon cycle.

Potential drivers of previous icehouse states include the movement of the tectonic plates and the opening and the closing of oceanic gateways. They seem to play a crucial part in driving Earth into an icehouse state, as tectonic shifts result in the transportation of cool, deep water, which circulates to the ocean surface and assists in ice sheet development at the poles. Examples of oceanic current shifts as a result of tectonic plate dynamics include the opening of the Tasmanian Gateway 36.5 million years ago, which separated Australia and Antarctica, and the opening of the Drake Passage 32.8 million years ago by the separation of South America and Antarctica, both of which are believed to have allowed for the development of the Antarctic ice sheet. The closing of the Isthmus of Panama and of the Indonesian seaway approximately 3 to 4 million years ago may also be a contributor to Earth's current icehouse state.

One proposed driver of the Ordovician Ice Age was the evolution of land plants. Under that paradigm, the rapid increase in photosynthetic biomass gradually removed CO_{2} from the atmosphere and replaced it with increasing levels of O_{2}, which induced global cooling.

A proposed driver of the Quaternary Ice age is the collision of the Indian subcontinent with Eurasia to form the Himalayas and the Tibetan Plateau. Under that paradigm, the resulting continental uplift revealed massive quantities of unweathered silicate rock CaSiO_{3}, which reacted with CO_{2} to produce CaCO_{3} (lime) and SiO_{2} (silica). The CaCO_{3} was eventually transported to the ocean and taken up by plankton, which then died and sank to the bottom of the ocean, which effectively removed CO_{2} from the atmosphere.

=== Glacials and interglacials ===
Within icehouse states are "glacial" and "interglacial" periods, where ice sheets build up or retreat. During an icehouse period, only about 20% of the time is spent in interglacial, or warmer times. Model simulations suggest that the current interglacial climate state will continue for at least another 100,000 years because of CO_{2} emissions, including the complete deglaciation of the Northern Hemisphere.

The main causes for glacial and interglacial periods are variations in the movement of Earth around the Sun. The astronomical components, discovered by the Serbian geophysicist Milutin Milanković and now known as Milankovitch cycles, include the axial tilt of Earth, the orbital eccentricity (or shape of the orbit), and the precession (or wobble) of Earth's rotation. The tilt of the axis tends to fluctuate from 21.5° to 24.5° and back every 41,000 years on the vertical axis. The change actually affects the seasonality on Earth since a change in solar radiation hits certain areas of the planet more often on a higher tilt, and a lower tilt creates a more even set of seasons worldwide. The changes can be seen in ice cores, which also contain evidence that during glacial times (at the maximum extension of the ice sheets), the atmosphere had lower levels of carbon dioxide (CO_{2}). That may be caused by change in physical ocean circulation, biological productivity and acid-base chemistry.

=== Snowball Earth ===
A "Snowball Earth" is the complete opposite of greenhouse Earth in which Earth's surface is completely frozen over. However, a snowball Earth technically does not have continental ice sheets like during the icehouse state. "The Great Infra-Cambrian Ice Age" has been claimed to be the host of such a world, and in 1964, the scientist W. Brian Harland brought forth his discovery of indications of glaciers in the low latitudes (Harland and Rudwick). That became a problem for Harland because of the thought of the "Runaway Snowball Paradox" (a kind of Snowball effect) that once Earth enters the route of becoming a snowball Earth, it would never be able to leave that state.

In 1992, geologist Joseph Kirschvink brought up a solution to the paradox and how Earth could enter and exit the snowball period. Since the continents were then huddled at the low and the middle latitudes, there was less ocean water available to absorb the higher amount solar energy hitting the tropics, and there was also an increase in rainfall because more land exposed to higher solar energy might have caused chemical weathering, which would contribute to removal of CO_{2} from the atmosphere. Both conditions might have caused a substantial drop in CO_{2} atmospheric levels which resulted in cooling temperatures and increasing ice albedo (ice reflectivity of incoming solar radiation), which would further increase global cooling (a positive feedback). That might have been the mechanism of entering Snowball Earth state.

Kirschvink explained that the way to get out of Snowball Earth state could be connected again to carbon dioxide. A possible explanation is that during Snowball Earth, volcanic activity would not halt but accumulate atmospheric CO_{2}. At the same time, global ice cover would prevent chemical weathering (particularly hydrolysis), responsible for removal of CO_{2} from the atmosphere. CO_{2} therefore accumulated in the atmosphere. Once the atmosphere accumulation of CO_{2} reached a threshold, temperature would rise enough for ice sheets to start melting. That would in turn reduce the ice albedo effect, which would in turn further reduce the ice cover and allow an exit from Snowball Earth. At the end of Snowball Earth, before the equilibrium "thermostat" between volcanic activity and the by then slowly resuming chemical weathering was reinstated, CO_{2} in the atmosphere had accumulated enough to cause temperatures to peak to as much as 60 °C, thrusting the Earth into a brief moist greenhouse state.

Around the same geologic period of Snowball Earth (it is debated if it was the cause or the result of Snowball Earth), the Great Oxygenation Event (GOE) was occurring. The event known as the Cambrian Explosion followed and produced the beginnings of populous bilateral organisms, as well as a greater diversity and mobility in multicellular life.

Some biologists claim that a complete snowball Earth could not have happened since photosynthetic life would not have survived under many meters of ice without sunlight. However, sunlight has been observed to penetrate meters of ice in Antarctica. Most scientists now believe that a "hard" Snowball Earth, one completely covered by ice, is probably impossible. However, a "slushball Earth", with points of opening near the equator, is considered to be possible.

Recent studies may have again complicated the idea of a snowball Earth. In October 2011, a team of French researchers announced that the carbon dioxide during the last speculated "snowball Earth" may have been lower than originally stated, which provides a challenge in finding out how Earth got out of its state and whether a snowball or a slushball Earth occurred.

== Transitions ==
=== Causes ===
The Eocene, which occurred between 56.0 and 33.9 million years ago, was Earth's warmest temperature period for 100 million years. However, the "super-greenhouse" period had eventually become an icehouse period by the late Eocene. It is believed that the decline of CO_{2} caused the change, but mechanisms of positive feedback may have contributed to the cooling.

The best available record for a transition from an icehouse to greenhouse period in which plant life existed is for the Permian period, which occurred around 300 million years ago. A major transition took place over the subsequent 40 million years and caused Earth to change from a moist, icy planet in which rainforests covered the tropics to a hot, dry, and windy location in which little could survive. Professor Isabel P. Montañez of University of California, Davis, who has researched the time period, found the climate to be "highly unstable" and to be "marked by dips and rises in carbon dioxide."

=== Impacts ===
The Eocene-Oligocene transition was the latest and occurred approximately 34 million years ago. It resulted in a rapid global cooling, the glaciation of Antarctica, and a series of biotic extinction events. The most dramatic species turnover event associated with the time period is the Grande Coupure, a period that saw the replacement of European tree-dwelling and leaf-eating mammal species by migratory species from Asia.

=== Research ===
Paleoclimatology is a branch of science that attempts to understand the history of greenhouse and icehouse conditions over geological time. The study of ice cores, dendrochronology, ocean and lake sediments (varve), palynology, (paleobotany), isotope analysis (such as radiometric dating and stable isotope analysis), and other climate proxies allows scientists to create models of Earth's past energy budgets and the resulting climate. One study has shown that atmospheric carbon dioxide levels during the Permian age rocked back and forth between 250 parts per million, which is close to today's levels, up to 2,000 parts per million. Studies on lake sediments suggest that the "hothouse" or "super-greenhouse" Eocene was in a "permanent El Niño state" after the 10 °C warming of the deep ocean and high latitude surface temperatures shut down the Pacific Ocean's El Niño-Southern Oscillation. A theory was suggested for the Paleocene–Eocene Thermal Maximum on the sudden decrease of the carbon isotopic composition of the global inorganic carbon pool by 2.5 parts per million. A hypothesis posed for this drop of isotopes was the increase of methane hydrates, the trigger for which remains a mystery. The increase of atmospheric methane, which happens to be a potent but short-lived greenhouse gas, increased the global temperatures by 6 °C with the assistance of the less potent carbon dioxide.

== List of icehouse and greenhouse periods ==
- A greenhouse period ran from 4.6 to 2.4 billion years ago.
- Huronian glaciation – an icehouse period that ran from 2.4 billion to 2.1 billion years ago
- A greenhouse period ran from 2.1 billion to 720 million years ago.
- Cryogenian – an icehouse period that ran from 720 to 635 million years ago during which the entire Earth was at times frozen over
- A greenhouse period ran from 635 million years ago to 450 million years ago.
- Andean-Saharan glaciation – an icehouse period that ran from 450 million to 420 million years ago
- A greenhouse period ran from 420 million years ago to 360 million years ago.
- Late Paleozoic Ice Age – an icehouse period that ran from 360 million to 260 million years ago
- A greenhouse period ran from 260 million years ago to 146 million years ago.
- Early Cretaceous Icehouse - an icehouse period that ran from 146 million to 113 million years
- Late Cenozoic Ice Age – the current icehouse period, which began 33.9 million years ago

== Modern conditions ==
Currently, Earth is in an icehouse climate state. About 34 million years ago, ice sheets began to form in Antarctica; the ice sheets in the Arctic did not start forming until 2 million years ago. Some processes that may have led to the current icehouse may be connected to the development of the Himalayan Mountains and the opening of the Drake Passage between South America and Antarctica, but climate model simulations suggest that the early opening of the Drake Passage played only a minor role, and the later constriction of the Tethys and Central American Seaways is more important in explaining the observed Cenozoic cooling. Scientists have tried to compare the past transitions between icehouse and greenhouse, and vice versa, to understand what type of climate state Earth will have next.

Without the human influence on the greenhouse gas concentration, a glacial period would be the next climate state. Predicted changes in orbital forcing suggest that in absence of human-made global warming, the next glacial period would begin at least 50,000 years from now (see Milankovitch cycles), but the ongoing anthropogenic greenhouse gas emissions mean the next climate state will be a greenhouse Earth period. Permanent ice is actually a rare phenomenon in the history of Earth and occurs only in coincidence with the icehouse effect, which has affected about 20% of Earth's history.

== See also ==
- List of periods and events in climate history
