= Lauren Birgenheier =

American geologist

- Education: Colorado College, University of Nebraska
- Awards: Experience Energy's GRIT Award, Inspirational Geoscience Educator Award (AAPG)
- Scientific career
- Fields: sedimentology, sequence stratigraphy, geochemistry, petroleum geology, deep-time paleoclimate
- Workplaces: University of Utah

Lauren Birgenheier is a geologist and associate professor at the University of Utah. Her fields of expertise include sedimentology and stratigraphy, geochemistry, paleoclimate, petroleum geology, reservoir characterization, and unconventional resources.

== Early life and education ==
Birgenheier attended Colorado College, graduating with a bachelor's degree in geology in 2002. Her thesis entitled “Sedimentology and biostratigraphy of Cambrian–Ordovician deposits: northern Wyoming and southern Montana” was completed in collaboration with her adviser Paul Myrow. Birgenheier was promoted to D.Phil. in geoscience at the University of Nebraska–Lincoln working in collaboration with Christopher Fielding and Tracy Frank. Her doctoral research focused on the Late Paleozoic Ice Age in Eastern Australia and the development of sedimentary geochemical proxies of paleoclimate. Important contributions from this work include exploring the links between atmospheric CO_{2} and glacial expansion and retreat using isotopic records (e.g.).

== Research and career ==
Birgenheier continued to work at University of Nebraska–Lincoln, in the Earth and Atmospheric Sciences department, as an instructor and then as a postdoctoral research associate. In 2008 she moved to Salt Lake City to conduct research at the Energy and Geoscience Institute at the University of Utah. Currently (2020), she is an associate professor in the Department of Geology & Geophysics at the University of Utah where she leads the Reservoirs Research Group]within the Earth Resources and Exploration Research Group.

Birgenheier's publication Evidence for Dynamic Climate Change on Sub-10^{6}-Year Scales from the Late Paleozoic Glacial Record focuses on the Paleozoic climate in New South Wales, Australia using glacial sedimentary deposit and U/Pb dates to see when, how long, and the rate at which the glaciers melted and how long it looked for the deposits to form. In CO_{2} Forced Climate and Vegetation Instability During Late Paleozoic Deglaciation carbon isotopes in fossilized plants and brachiopods from locations all over the world are compared to Gondwanan glacial records. The results determined water surface temperature as well as the partial pressure of carbon dioxide in the late Paleozoic deglaciation period's atmosphere. The team was interested in studying this transition time because it is one of the only vegetated ice-house to hot-house transition periods. What they determined re-affirmed what we believe about CO_{2} interactions with the atmosphere; low levels of CO_{2} cause a growth of glaciers and high levels cause a rise in temperatures.

Following her PhD, Birgenheier's research program expanded to include the use of sedimentology, stratigraphy, and geochemistry to examine our energy resources; though she has continued to pursue questions related to deep-time paleoclimate e.g. examination of Eocene climate using a record from the Green River Formation. The majority of her work focuses on sedimentary geology as applied to unconventional energy resources such as shale oil and shale gas systems. For example, her 2017 Sedimentology paper used sediment stratigraphy and geochemistry to distinguish three offshore depositional environments which should better inform predictive hydrocarbon reservoir models.

== Publications ==
Birgenheier's notable publications include:

- Climate impact on fluvial-lake system evolution, Eocene Green River Formation, Uinta Basin, Utah, USA (2020) GSA Bulletin, 132 (3–4)
- A depositional model for offshore deposits of the lower Blue Gate Member, Mancos Shale, Uinta Basin, Utah, USA (2017) Sedimentology 64 (5)
- Coupled carbon isotopic and sedimentological records from the Permian system of eastern Australia reveal the response of atmospheric carbon dioxide to glacial growth and decay during the late Palaeozoic Ice Age (2010) Palaeogeography, Palaeoclimatology, Palaeoecology, 286
- Evidence for Dynamic Climate Change on Sub-10^{6}-Year Scales from the Late Paleozoic Glacial Record, Tamworth Belt, New South Wales, Australia (2009) Journal of Sedimentary Research Volume 79
- Stratigraphic imprint of the Late Palaeozoic Ice Age in eastern Australia: a record of alternating glacial and nonglacial climate regime (2008) Journal of the Geological Society, 165.
- The magnitude of Late Paleozoic glacioeustatic fluctuations: a synthesis (2008) Journal of Sedimentary Research, 78.
- CO_{2} Forced Climate and Vegetation Instability During Late Paleozoic Deglaciation (2007), Science, 315(5808)

== Personal life ==
Birgenheier is a single mother.
