= Hirnantian Isotopic Carbon Excursion =

The Hirnantian Isotopic Carbon Excursion (HICE) is a positive carbon isotope excursion which took place at the end of the Ordovician period, during the Hirnantian Age from around 445.2 Ma to 443.8 Ma (million years ago). The HICE is connected to a large scale, but short glaciation, as well as the End Ordovician mass extinction, which wiped out 85% of marine life. The exact cause of the HICE is still debated, however it is a key event for defining the Ordovician-Silurian boundary.

== Timing and stratigraphy ==
The HICE is widely recognized as short in terms of geologic time, but just how short is still debated. The current official timing of the Hirnantian, and thus the HICE, in the geologic record according to the International Commission on Stratigraphy is 445.2 (±1.3) Ma to 443.8 (± 1.5). Another proposed date for the HICE is 443.14 (± 0.24) Ma to 442.67 Ma (± 0.34). Major uncertainty over the age is partly due to the short time frame of both the HICE and Hirnantian age and comparatively large statistical error on these dates.

Complete sections of Hirnantian age rocks outcrop primarily across the Northern Hemisphere, with notable sections in China, Scotland, Canada, the United States, Norway, and Latvia, summarized in Table 1. Due to erosion from the associated glaciation, the thickness of these sections are small, often not larger than several meters to tens to meters in thickness. Most preserved rocks are shallow water deposits, but some notable deeper water deposits exist in China. These formations mostly show a regular trend of initial deep sea rocks like shale and mudstones, then deposition of shallow limestone's during the Hirnantian. These then returned to deep shales and muds as water rose again at the end of the Hirnantian due to de-glaciation. Rocks which stayed in deep water environments during the HICE continued to deposit mudstones or shale. Most sections analyzed for carbon 13 isotope ratio's (δ13C) show a positive shift of +3-6%, although some sections show values as high as +7% or as low as +2%.

Table 1:
Country	Location and Formation	HICE Thickness	δ13C Range (At Peak)
Canada	Anticosti Island (Ellis Bay Formation)	~7.5m	3-4%
	Cornwallis Island (Cape Phillips Embayment)	10-15m	3-6%
China	Wangjiawan (Upper Wufeng, Kuanyinchiao Formations)	1.2m	2-3%
	Nanbazi (Upper Wufeng, Kuanyinchiao Formations)	~7m	3-4%
Estonia	Central Estonia (Ärina Formation)	3-6m	2-6%
Latvia	West to Northern Latvia (Kuldiga and Saldus Formations)	14-21m	3-6%
Norway	Oslofjord (Langøyene, Langara, Upper Husbergøya, and Lower Solvik Formations)	13-51m	3-6%
Scotland	Dob's Linn (Upper Hartfell, Lower Birkhill Formations)	~3.5m	3%
United States of America	Vinini Creek (Vinini Formation)	10m	2-3%
	Monitor Range (Hanson Creek Formation)	~40m	4-6%

== Causes ==
The exact cause of the HICE is still debated, although there are 2 main hypotheses. One hypothesis states that it was primarily due to enhanced burial of carbon. High water levels and enhanced weathering in the earlier Katian Age created more space and nutrients for marine eukaryotes, which grew larger and thus sank to the ocean floor more readily, burying more organic carbon in the sediments. The other hypothesis states that a cooling trend through the Katian created glacial conditions, and the retreating glaciers exposed large numbers of near-shore marine carbonates to weathering. The weathering of these carbonates pumped more carbon back into the ocean, raising the buried δ13C.

Many of the deeper water sections show lower increases in δ13C than the shallow water sections. It's been proposed that the deep water rocks represent the true signal of the HICE, while the shallow water rocks show a higher value due to alteration.

== Debates and comparisons ==
Aside from the cause and age, other parts of the HICE are also still debated. For example, some studies have shown that there may have been multiple cycles of sea level rise and fall within this time period. Disagreement also exists over the exact timing of the HICE. Biostratigraphy is often used to aid in identifying the Hirnantian, and thus the HICE, where the Hirnantian is defined as encompassing the N. extraordinarius biozone and the N. presculptus biozone. When some or entire sections of these fossils are missing, it can complicate reconstruction and correlation of sections. Some localities are interpreted to show the peak of the HICE at the start of the Hirnantian, while others are interpreted to not reach their peak until later into the age. This, along with the small section thicknesses, can make it difficult to correlate sections worldwide with one another.

The HICE is far shorter and smaller in magnitude than other isotopic excursions from the earlier Precambrian, but is of a comparable to lower magnitude compared to other positive carbon isotope excursions in the Phanerozoic. The closest comparable excursion to the HICE is the Steptoean positive carbon isotope excursion (SPICE), a positive excursion of up to +5% δ13C which lasted for 2-4 million years and occurred around 295 Ma ago. Both excursions have similar proposed causes, including enhanced burial of carbon and weathering of carbonates. The two excursions are also of a similar time frame, lasting in the single digit millions of years.
