= Late Cenozoic Ice Age =

Ice age of the last 34 million years, in particular in Antarctica

Late Cenozoic Ice Age; 33.9 million years ago to present Divisions within the current ice age For divisions prior to 33.9 million years ago, see Geologic time scale
Period	Epoch	Age
↑ Paleogene	Oligocene; 33.9 to 23.03 Ma (last epoch of the Paleogene Period) Pyrotherium romeroi and Rhynchippus equinus, Oligocene of South America	Rupelian; 33.9 to 27.82 Ma
↑ Paleogene	Oligocene; 33.9 to 23.03 Ma (last epoch of the Paleogene Period) Pyrotherium romeroi and Rhynchippus equinus, Oligocene of South America	Chattian; 27.82 to 23.03 Ma
Neogene	Miocene; 23.03 to 5.333 Ma Socotra Dragon Tree	Aquitanian; 23.03 to 20.44 Ma
Neogene	Miocene; 23.03 to 5.333 Ma Socotra Dragon Tree	Burdigalian; 20.44 to 15.98 Ma
Neogene	Miocene; 23.03 to 5.333 Ma Socotra Dragon Tree	Langhian; 15.98 to 13.82 Ma
Neogene	Miocene; 23.03 to 5.333 Ma Socotra Dragon Tree	Serravallian; 13.82 to 11.63 Ma
Neogene	Miocene; 23.03 to 5.333 Ma Socotra Dragon Tree	Tortonian; 11.63 to 7.246 Ma
Neogene	Miocene; 23.03 to 5.333 Ma Socotra Dragon Tree	Messinian; 7.246 to 5.333 Ma
Neogene	Pliocene; 5.333 to 2.58 Ma Pliocene at the beginning of humans	Zanclean; 5.333 to 3.6 Ma
Neogene	Pliocene; 5.333 to 2.58 Ma Pliocene at the beginning of humans	Piacenzian; 3.6 to 2.58 Ma
Quaternary	Pleistocene; 2.58 Ma to 11.7 ka (Note: In standard nomenclature the Pleistocene Epoch lasts from 2.58 Ma to 11.7 ka and the Holocene epoch lasts from 11.7 ka to present. However, it is disputed whether these should in fact be treated separately, or whether the "Holocene" is in fact merely a Pleistocene interglacial. See below for details.) Columbian mammoth, Pleistocene North America	Gelasian; 2.58 to 1.8 Ma
Quaternary	Pleistocene; 2.58 Ma to 11.7 ka Columbian mammoth, Pleistocene North America	Calabrian; 1.8 Ma to 774 ka
Quaternary	Pleistocene; 2.58 Ma to 11.7 ka Columbian mammoth, Pleistocene North America	Middle Pleistocene ("Chibanian") ("Ionian"); 774 to 129 ka
Quaternary	Pleistocene; 2.58 Ma to 11.7 ka Columbian mammoth, Pleistocene North America	Upper/Late Pleistocene ("Tarantian"); 129 to 11.7 ka
Quaternary	Holocene; 11.7 ka to present	Greenlandian; 11.7 to 8.2 ka
Quaternary	Holocene; 11.7 ka to present	Northgrippian; 8.2 to 4.2 ka
Quaternary	Holocene; 11.7 ka to present	Meghalayan; 4.2 ka to present
The Late Cenozoic Ice Age falls within the Cenozoic Era which started 66 million years ago. The Cenozoic Era is part of the Phanerozoic Eon which started ~538.8 million years ago.

The Late Cenozoic Ice Age, or Antarctic Glaciation, began 34 million years ago at the Eocene-Oligocene Boundary and is ongoing. It is Earth's current ice age or icehouse period. Its beginning is marked by the formation of the Antarctic ice sheets.

Six million years after the start of the Late Cenozoic Ice Age, the East Antarctic Ice Sheet had formed, and 14 million years ago it had reached its current extent.

In the last three million years, glaciations have spread to the northern hemisphere. It commenced with Greenland becoming increasingly covered by an ice sheet in late Pliocene (2.9-2.58 Ma ago) During the Pleistocene Epoch (starting 2.58 Ma ago), the Quaternary glaciation developed with decreasing mean temperatures and increasing amplitudes between glacials and interglacials. During the glacial periods of the Pleistocene, large areas of northern North America and northern Eurasia have been covered by ice sheets.

== History of discovery and naming ==
In 1837, German naturalist Karl Friedrich Schimper coined the term Eiszeit, meaning ice age (or ice time for a more literal translation). For a long time, the term referred only to glacial periods. Over time, this developed into the concept that they were all part of a much longer ice age.

The concept that the Earth is currently in an ice age that began around 30 million years ago can be dated back to at least 1966.

As a geologic time period, the Late Cenozoic Ice Age was used at least as early as 1973.

== The climate before the polar ice caps ==
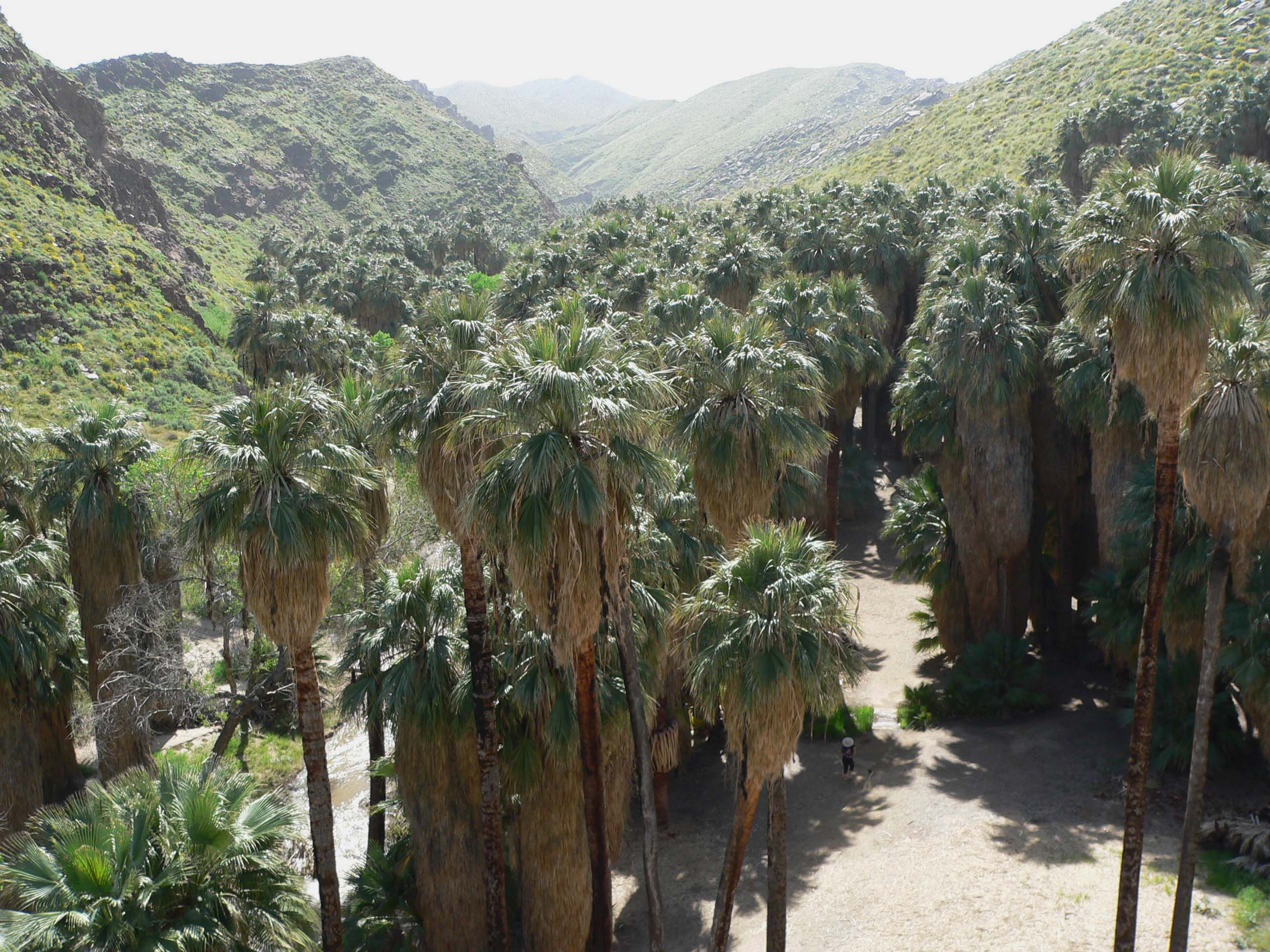
This type of vegetation grew in Antarctica during the Eocene Epoch - Photo taken at Palm Canyon, California, US in 2005

The last greenhouse period began 260 million years ago during the late Permian Period at the end of the Karoo Ice Age. It lasted all through the time of the non-avian dinosaurs during the Mesozoic Era, and ended 33.9 million years ago in the middle of the Cenozoic Era (the current Era). This greenhouse period lasted 226.1 million years.

The hottest part of the last greenhouse earth was the Late Paleocene - Early Eocene. This was a hothouse period that lasted from 65 to 55 million years ago. The hottest part of this torrid age was the Paleocene–Eocene Thermal Maximum, 55.5 million years ago. Average global temperatures were around 30 °C (86 °F). This was only the second time that Earth reached this level of warmth since the Precambrian. The other time was during the Cambrian Period, which ran from 538.8 million years ago to 485.4 million years ago.

During the early Eocene, Australia and South America were connected to Antarctica.

53 million years ago during the Eocene Epoch, summer high temperatures in Antarctica were around 25 °C (77 °F). Temperatures during winter were around 10 °C (50 °F). It did not frost during the winter. The climate was so warm that trees grew in Antarctica. Arecaceae (palm trees) grew on the coastal lowlands, and Fagus (beech trees) and Pinophyta (conifers) grew on the hills just inland from the coast.

As the global climate became cooler, the planet was seeing a decrease in forests, and an increase in savannas. Animals were evolving to have a larger body size.

== Glaciation of the southern hemisphere ==
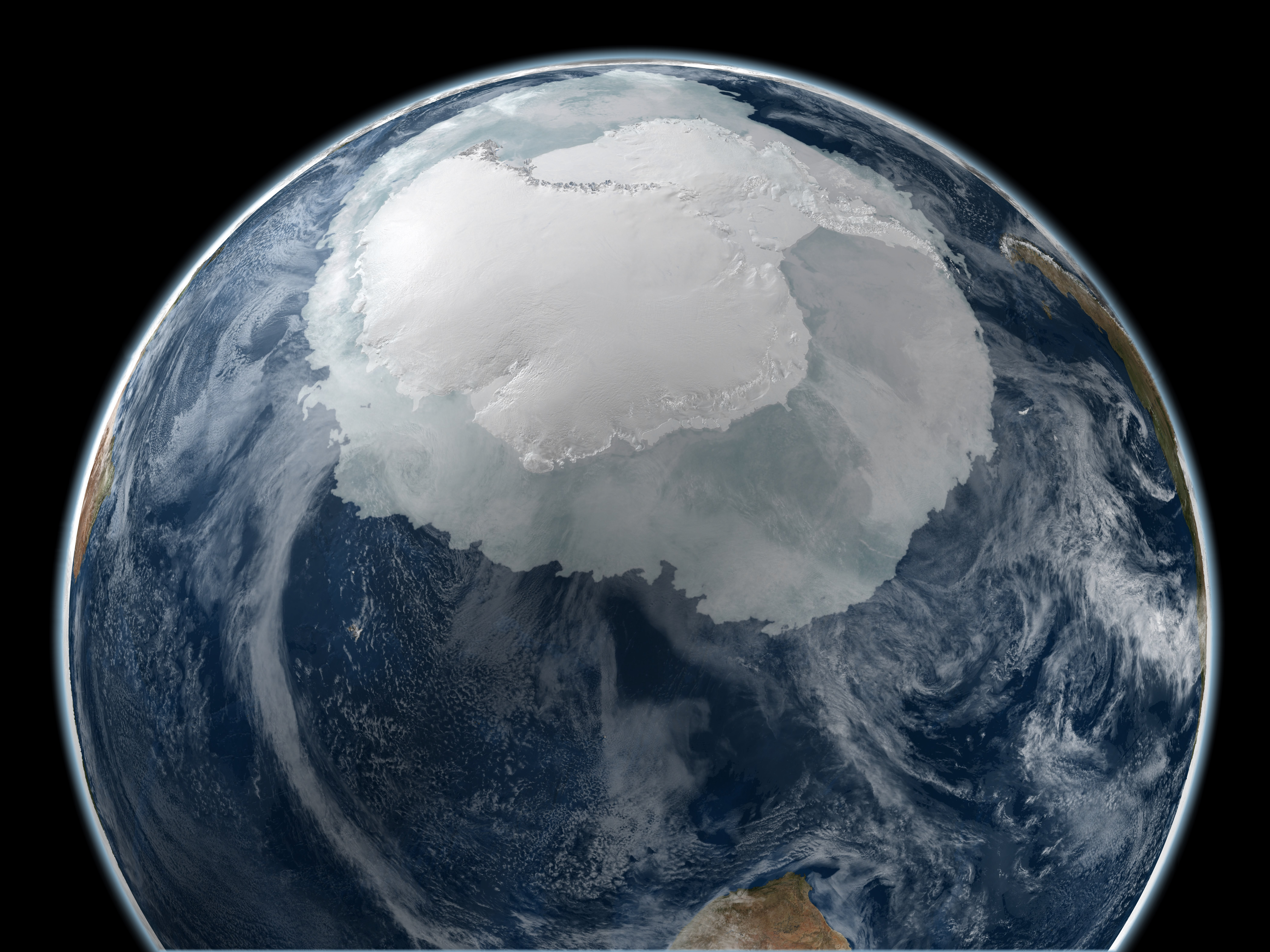
Antarctica from space on 21 September 2005

Australia drifted away from Antarctica forming the Tasmanian Passage, and South America drifted away from Antarctica forming the Drake Passage. This caused the formation of the Antarctic Circumpolar Current, a current of cold water surrounding Antarctica. This current still exists today, and is a major reason for why Antarctica has such an exceptionally cold climate.

The Eocene-Oligocene Boundary 33.9 million years ago was the transition from the last greenhouse period to the present icehouse climate. At this point, when ~25% more of Antarctica's surface was above sea level and able to support land-based ice sheets relative to today, CO_{2} levels had dropped to 750 ppm. This was the beginning of the Late Cenozoic Ice Age. This was when the ice sheets reached the ocean, the defining point.

At 29.2 million years ago, there were three ice caps in the high elevations of Antarctica. One ice cap formed in the Dronning Maud Land. Another ice cap formed in the Gamburtsev Mountain Range. Another ice cap formed in the Transantarctic Mountains. At this point, the ice caps weren't very big yet. Most of Antarctica wasn't covered by ice. By 28.7 million years ago, the Gamburtsev ice cap was now much larger due to the colder climate. CO_{2} continued to fall and the climate continued to get colder. At 28.1 million years ago, the Gamburtsev and Transantarctic ice caps merged into a main central ice cap. At this point, ice was now covering a majority of the continent. The Dronning Maud ice cap merged with the main ice cap 27.9 million years ago. This was the formation of the East Antarctic Ice Sheet.

Global refrigeration set in 22 million years ago.

About 15 million years ago was the warmest part of the Late Cenozoic Ice Age, with average global temperatures around 18.4 °C (65.1 °F). Atmospheric CO_{2} levels were around 700 ppm. This time period was called the Mid-Miocene Climatic Optimum (MMCO). By 14 million years ago, the Antarctic ice sheets were similar in size and volume to present times. Glaciers were starting to form in the mountains of the Northern Hemisphere.

Between 3.6 and 3.4 million years ago, there was a sudden but brief warming period.

== Glaciation of the northern hemisphere ==
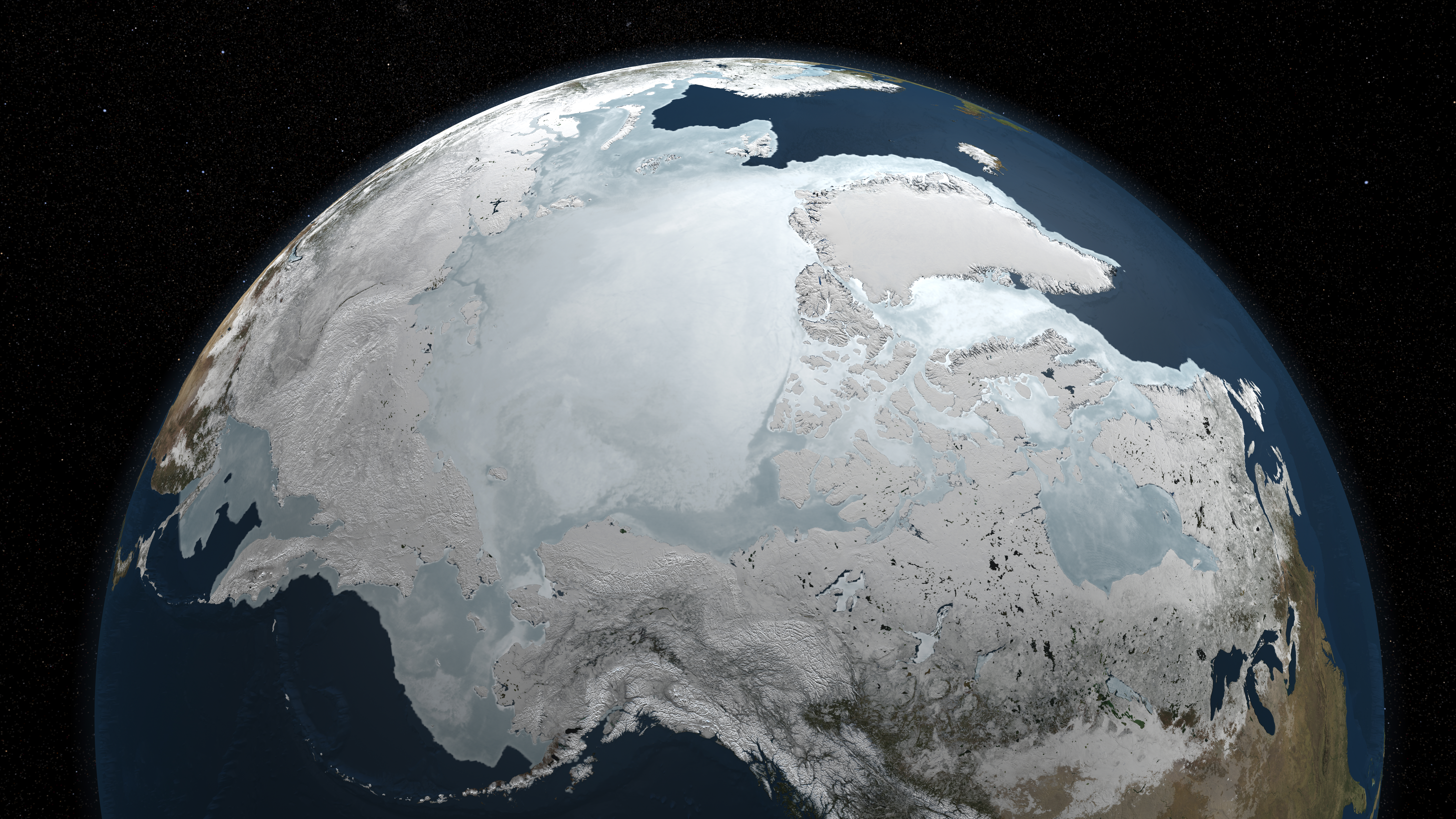
Arctic sea ice and terrestrial snow cover from space on 6 March 2010

The glaciation of the Arctic in the Northern Hemisphere commenced with Greenland becoming increasingly covered by an ice sheet in late Pliocene (2.9-2.58 Ma ago). By about 3 million years ago, an isthmus had formed between North and South America, joining both continents and preventing oceanic currents from circulating between the Pacific and Atlantic oceans. As a result the northeast part of the Atlantic Ocean underwent harsher winters.

The current period is the Quaternary, which started 2.58 million years ago. It is divided into the Pleistocene, which ended 11,700 years ago, and the current Holocene. The Quaternary is characterized by alternating glacial periods, during which extensive ice sheets cover large portions of the Earth, and interglacial periods, which are warmer with reduced ice cover.

The oscillation between glacial and interglacial periods is due to the Milankovitch cycles. These are cycles in Earth's axial tilt and orbital eccentricity. Earth is currently tilted at 23.5 degrees. Over a 41,000 year cycle, the tilt oscillates between 22.1 and 24.5 degrees. When the tilt is greater (high obliquity), the seasons are more extreme, and the poles receive a greater fraction of the planet's insolation. When the tilt is lesser (low obliquity), the seasons are less extreme, and the poles receive a lesser fraction of the insolation. As such, at low tilt, the reduced polar sunlight allows polar ice sheets to build, causing a colder global climate via albedo reduction.

The shape of Earth's orbit around the Sun affects the Earth's climate. Over a 100,000 year cycle, Earth oscillates between having a circular orbit to having a more elliptical orbit. From 2.58 million years ago to about 1.73 million ± 50,000 years ago, the degree of axial tilt was the main cause of glacial and interglacial periods.

Around 850,000 ± 50,000 years ago, the degree of orbital eccentricity became the main driver of glacial and interglacial periods rather than the degree of tilt, and this pattern continues to present-day.

== Last Glacial Period ==
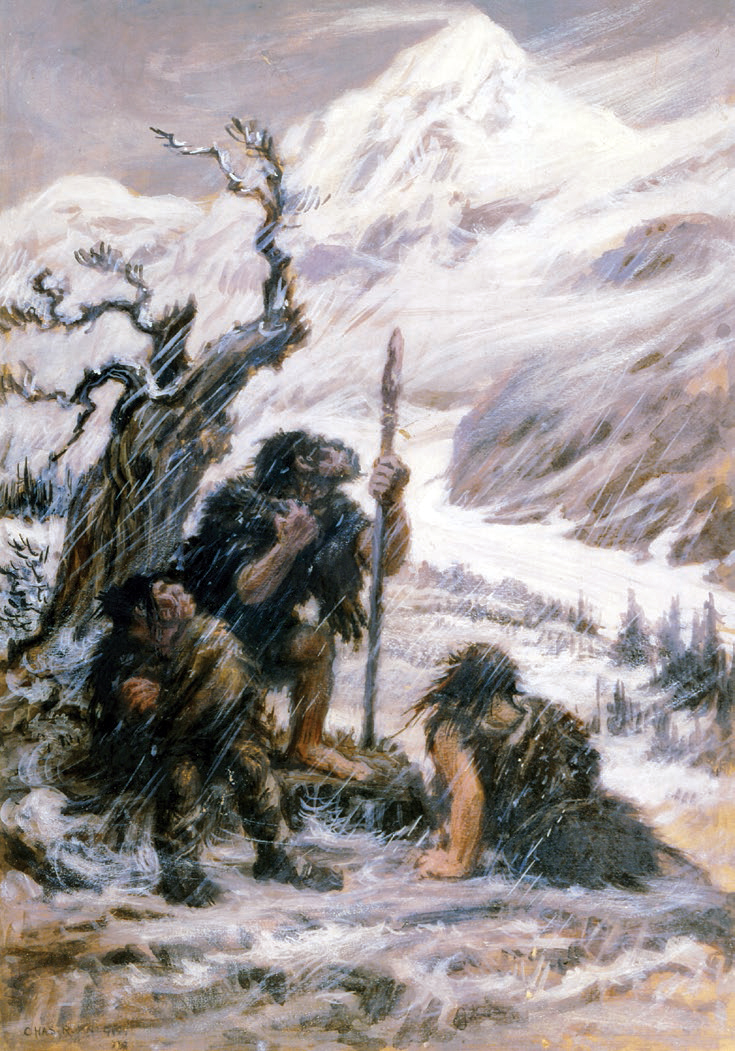
Neanderthals during the last glacial period.

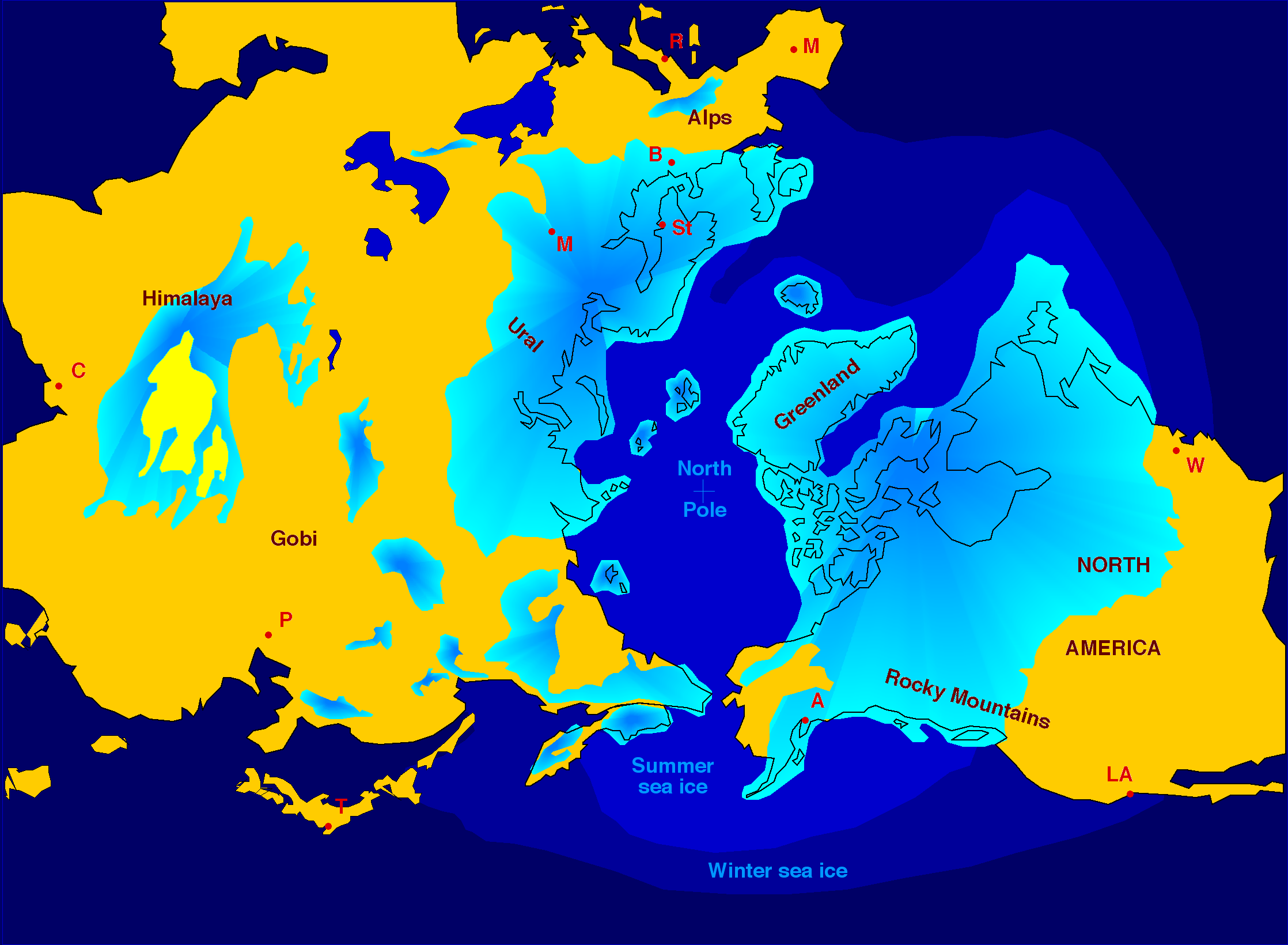
Map of the Northern Hemisphere ice during the last glacial maximum.

The Last Glacial Period began 115,000 years ago and ended 11,700 years ago. This time period saw the great advancement of polar ice sheets into the middle latitudes of the Northern Hemisphere.

The Toba eruption 75,000 years ago in present-day Sumatra, Indonesia has been linked to a bottleneck in the human DNA, although such a causal link remains highly controversial.

50,000 years ago, Homo sapiens migrated out of Africa. They began replacing other Hominins in Asia. They also began replacing Neanderthals in Europe. However, some of the Homo sapiens and Neanderthals interbred. Currently, persons of European descent are two to four percent Neanderthal. With the exception of this small amount of Neanderthal DNA that exists today, Neanderthals became extinct 30,000 years ago.

The Last Glacial Maximum ran from 26,500 years ago to 20,000 years ago. Although different ice sheets reached maximum extent at somewhat different times, this was the time when ice sheets overall were at maximum extent.

According to Blue Marble 3000 (a video by the Zurich University of Applied Sciences), the average global temperature around 19,000 BCE (about 21,000 years ago) was 9.0 °C (48.2 °F). This is about 4.8 °C (8.6 °F) colder than the 1850-1929 average, and 6.0 °C (10.8 °F) colder than the 2011-2020 average.

The figures given by the Intergovernmental Panel On Climate Change (IPCC) estimate a slightly lower global temperature than the figures given by the Zurich University of Applied Sciences. However, these figures are not exact figures and are open more to interpretation. According to the IPCC, average global temperatures increased by 5.5 ± 1.5 °C (9.9 ± 2.7 °F) since the last glacial maximum, and the rate of warming was about 10 times slower than that of the 20th century. It appears that they are defining the present as the early period of instrumental records when temperatures were less affected by human activity, but they do not specify exact years, or give a temperature for the present.

Berkeley Earth publishes a list of average global temperatures by year. It shows that temperatures were stable from the beginning of records in 1850 until 1929. The average temperature during these years was 13.8 °C (56.8 °F). When subtracting 5.5 ± 1.5 °C (9.9 ± 2.7 °F) from the 1850-1929 average, the average temperature for the last glacial maximum comes out to 8.3 ± 1.5 °C (46.9 ± 2.7 °F). This is about 6.7 ± 1.5 °C (12.0 ± 2.7 °F) colder than the 2011-2020 average. This figure is open to interpretation because the IPCC does not specify 1850-1829 as being the present, or give any exact set of years as being the present. It also does not state whether or not they agree with the figures given by Berkeley Earth.

According to the United States Geographical Survey (USGS), permanent summer ice covered about 8% of Earth's surface and 25% of the land area during the last glacial maximum. The USGS also states that sea level was about 125 m (410 ft) lower than in present times (2012). The volume of ice on Earth was around 17,000,000 mi^{3} (71,000,000 km^{3}), which is about 2.1 times Earth's current volume of ice.

== Holocene ==
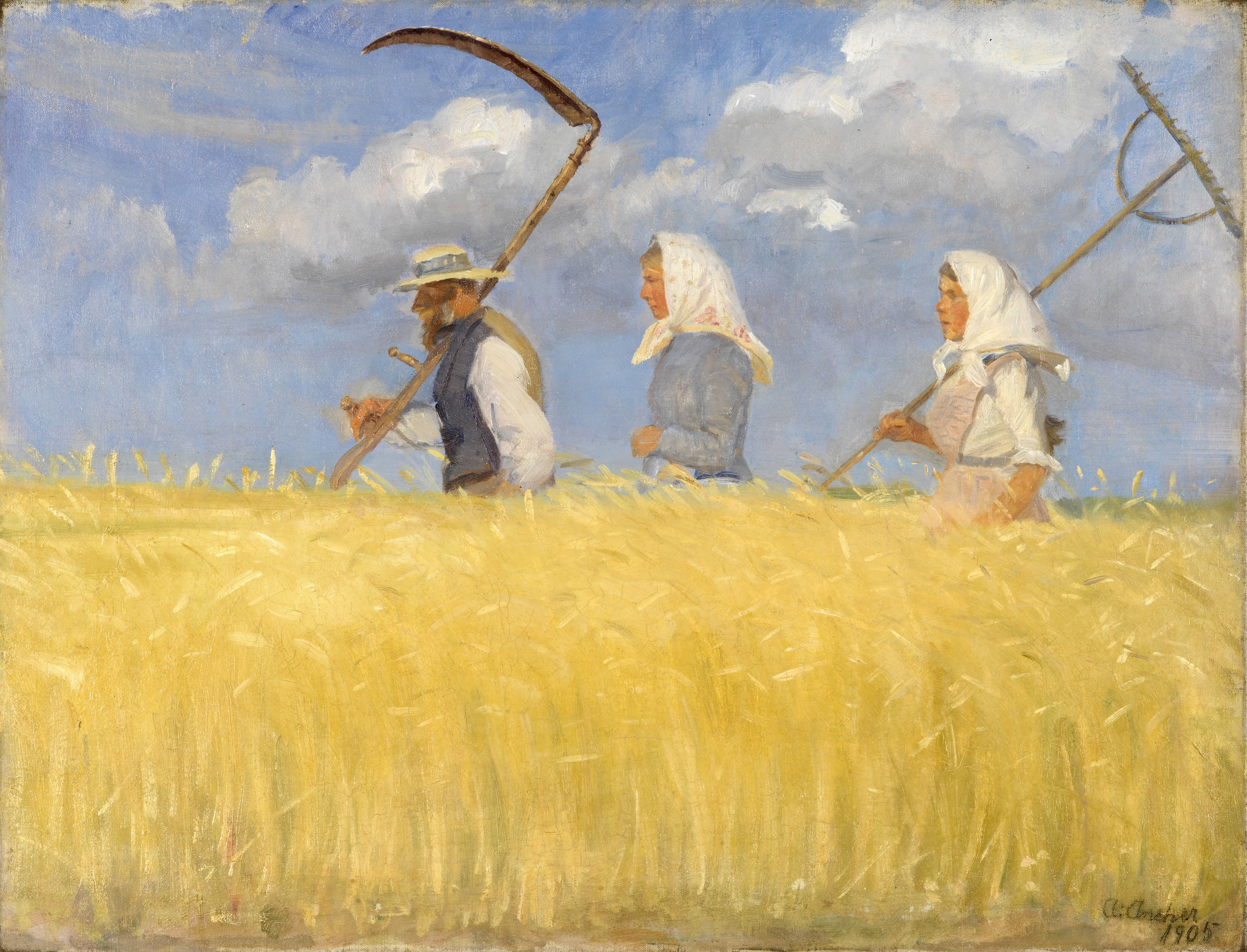
Agriculture and the rise of civilization came about during the current interglacial period.

The Earth is currently in an interglacial period called the Holocene epoch. However, there is debate as to whether it is actually a separate epoch or merely an interglacial period within the Pleistocene epoch. Between 9,000 and 5,000 years ago there was a warm period called the Holocene climatic optimum.

Being in an interglacial, there is less ice than there was during the last glacial period. However, the last glacial period was just one part of the ice age that still continues today. Even though Earth is in an interglacial, there is still more ice than times outside of ice ages. There are also currently ice sheets in the Northern Hemisphere, which means that there is more ice on Earth than there was during the first 31 million years of the Late Cenozoic Ice Age. During that time, only the Antarctic ice sheets existed. Currently (as of 2012), about 3.1% of Earth's surface and 10.7% of the land area is covered in year-round ice according to the USGS. The total volume of ice presently on Earth is about 33,000,000 km^{3} (7,900,000 mi^{3}) (as of 2004). The current sea level (as of 2009) is 70 m (230 ft) lower than it would be without the ice sheets of Antarctica and Greenland.

Based on the Milankovitch cycles, the current interglacial period is predicted to be unusually long, continuing for another 25,000 to 50,000 years beyond present times. There are also high concentrations of greenhouse gases in the atmosphere from human activity, and it is almost certain to get higher in the coming decades. This will lead to higher temperatures. In 25,000 to 50,000 years, the climate will begin to cool due to the Milankovich cycles. However, the high levels of greenhouse gases are predicted to keep it from getting cold enough to build up enough ice to meet the criteria of a glacial period. This would effectively extend the current interglacial period an additional 100,000 years placing the next glacial period 125,000 to 150,000 years in the future.

== See also ==
- Azolla event, the hypothesis that Azolla ferns triggered the Late Cenozoic Ice Age
- Beringia, the land that connected Eurasia and North America during the last glacial period
- Bølling–Allerød interstadial, a warm period toward the end of the last glacial period
- Cat gap, a gap in the North American cat fossil record 25 to 18.5 million years ago
- Eemian, the last interglacial period
- Louis Agassiz, a Swiss-American biologist and geologist who helped develop glacial theory
- Marine isotope stages, the names of past climate periods
- Penultimate Glacial Period, the second to last glacial period
- Proailurus, an early cat or cat-like animal that lived 25 million years ago
- Timeline of the evolutionary history of life
- Timeline of human evolution
- Weichselian glaciation, the glaciation of Scandinavia and northern Europe during the last glacial period
- Wisconsin glaciation, the glaciation of North America during the last glacial period
- Würm glaciation, the glaciation of the Alps during the last glacial period
- Younger Dryas, a return to glacial conditions around 7 thousand years after the end of last glacial maximum
