= Joseph Kirschvink =

American geologist and geophysicist (born 1953)

- Education: Caltech (BS, MS 1975); Princeton University (MA 1978, PhD 1979)
- Scientific career
- Fields: Geobiology
- Thesis: I. A paleomagnetic approach to the Precambrian-Cambrian boundary problem. II. Biogenic magnetite: its role in the magnetization of sediments and as the basis of magnetic field detection in animals (1979)

Joseph L. Kirschvink (born 1953) is an American geologist and geophysicist. He is the Nico and Marilyn Van Wingen Professor of Geobiology at Caltech, known for contributions to paleomagnetism and biomagnetism (discovery of the first magnetofossils) and the Snowball Earth hypothesis. He is also Principal Investigator (PI) of Earth–Life Science Institute.

== Biography ==
In 1988, Kirschvink was recognized as a "Rising Star" in Southern California by the Los Angeles Times. In 2021, Caltech settled with the Department of the Interior to pay $25,465 for damages to petroglyph sites in Volcanic Tablelands after they were damaged by Dr. Kirschvink on Earth Day 2017.

== See also ==
- Greenhouse and icehouse Earth
