= Hirnantian glaciation =

Glaciation 460 million to 430 million years ago

The Hirnantian glaciation, also known as the Andean-Saharan glaciation, Early Paleozoic Ice Age (EPIA), the Early Paleozoic Icehouse, the Late Ordovician glaciation, or the end-Ordovician glaciation, occurred during the Paleozoic from around 460 to 420 million years ago. The major glaciation during this period was formerly thought only to consist of the Hirnantian glaciation itself but has now been recognized as a longer, more gradual event, which began as early as the Darriwilian, and possibly even the Floian. Evidence of this glaciation can be seen in places such as Arabia, North Africa, South Africa, Brazil, Peru, Bolivia, Chile, Argentina, and Wyoming. More evidence derived from isotopic data is that during the Late Ordovician, tropical ocean temperatures were about 5 °C cooler than present day; this would have been a major factor that aided in the glaciation process.

Cold temperatures are widely considered to be the leading cause of the Late Ordovician mass extinction, and it is the only glacial episode that appears to have coincided with a major mass extinction of nearly 61% of marine life. Estimates of peak ice sheet volume range from 50 to 250 million cubic kilometres, and its duration from 35 million to less than 1 million years. At its height during the Hirnantian, the ice age is believed to have been significantly more extreme than the Last Glacial Maximum occurring during the terminal Pleistocene. Glaciation of the Northern Hemisphere was minimal because a large amount of the land was in the Southern Hemisphere.

== Timeline ==
=== Pre-Hirnantian glaciations ===
The earliest evidence for possible glaciation comes from Floian conodont apatite oxygen isotope fluctuations, which display a periodicity characteristic of Milankovitch cycles and have been interpreted as reflecting cyclic waxing and waning of polar ice caps. A speculated glaciation in the middle Darriwilian corresponds to the MDICE positive carbon isotope excursion. Sea level changes likely reflective of glacioeustasy are known from this geologic stage, around 467 million years ago. However, there are no known Middle Ordovician glacial deposits that would provide direct geological evidence of glaciation. Isotopic evidence from the Sandbian reveals three possible glaciations: an early Sandbian glaciation, a middle Sandbian glaciation, a late Sandbian glaciation. Although biostratigraphy dating the glacial deposits in Gondwana has been problematic, there is evidence suggesting the presence of glaciation by the Sandbian stage. Graptolite distribution during the time interval delineated by the Nemacanthus gracilis graptolite biozone indicates a latitudinal extent of the subtropics and tropics similar to that of today, as evidenced by a steep faunal gradient that is uncharacteristic of greenhouse periods, suggesting that Earth was in a mild icehouse state by the start of the Sandbian, around 460 million years ago. Many possible short glaciation occurred during the Katian: three very short glaciations during the early Katian, the Rakvere glaciation during the late early Katian, a middle Katian glaciation, the Early Ashgill glaciation of the early late Katian, and a latest Katian glaciation that was followed by a rapid warming event in the Paraorthograptus pacificus graptolite biozone immediately before the Hirnantian glaciation itself. Evidence of major changes in bottom water formation, which usually indicates a sudden change in global climate, is known from the Katian. Shifts in isotopic ratios of carbon and neodymium that correspond to graptolite biostratigraphy lend further evidence in favour of the existence of glacioeustatic cycles during the Katian, as do conodont apatite δ^{18}O fluctuations from Kentucky and Quebec that likely reflect glacioeustatic sea level changes. However, the existence of glacials during the Katian remains controversial. Katian brachiopod and seawater δ^{18}O values from Cincinnati Arch indicate ocean temperatures characteristic of a global greenhouse state.

=== Hirnantian glaciation ===
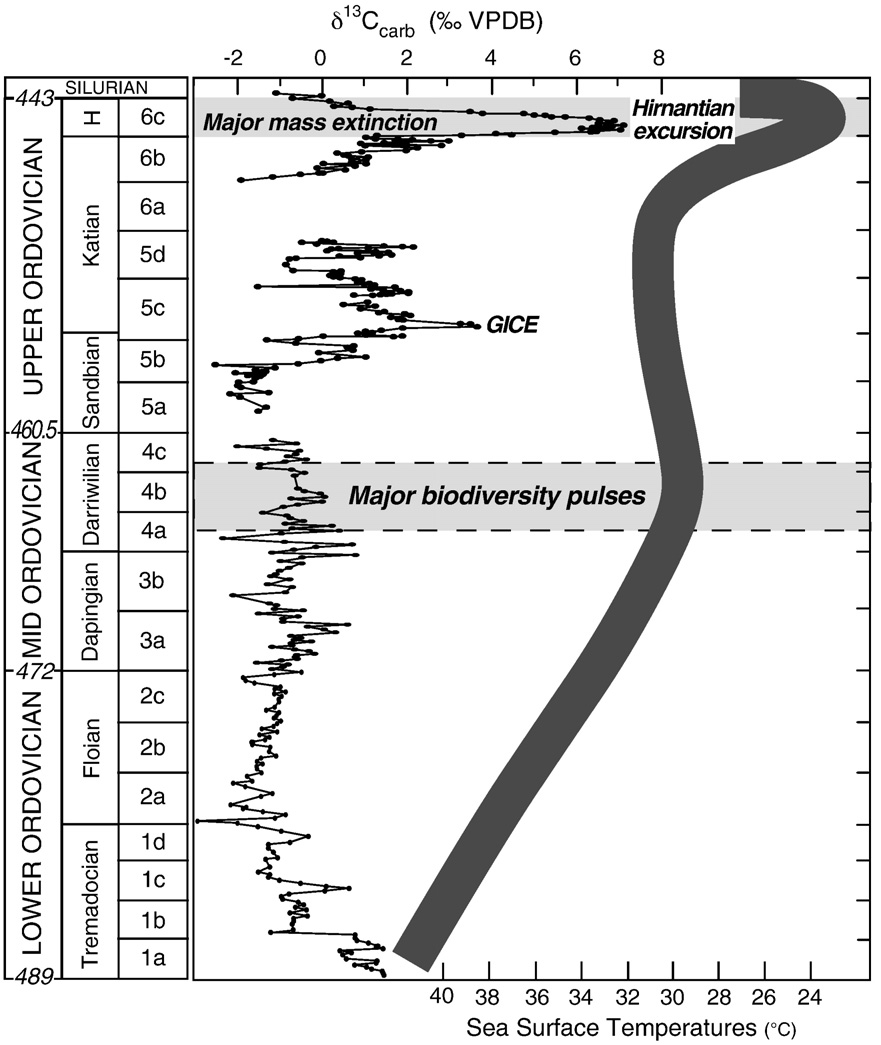
In this graph the time period that represents the Late Ordovician is at the very top. There is a sharp shift in carbon 13, as well as a sharp decline in sea surface temperatures.

At the Katian-Hirnantian boundary, a sudden cooling event caused a rapid expansion of glaciers, resulting in one of the most severe glaciations of the Phanerozoic, an extreme cooling event generally believed to be coincident with the first pulse of the Late Ordovician mass extinction. An δ^{18}O shift occurs at the start of the Hirnantian; the magnitude of this shift (+2-4‰) was extraordinary. Its direction implies glacial cooling and possibly increases in ice-volume. The observed shifts in the δ^{18}O isotopic indicator would require a sea-level fall of 100 meters and a drop of 10 °C in tropical ocean temperatures to have occurred during this glacial episode. Sedimentological data shows that Late Ordovician ice sheets glacierized the Al Kufrah Basin. Ice sheets also probably formed continuous ice cover over North Africa and the Arabian Peninsula. In all areas of North Africa where Early Silurian shale occurs, Late Ordovician glaciogenic deposits occur beneath, likely due to the anoxia promoted in these basins.

At the end of the Hirnantian, an abrupt retreat of glaciers concurrent with the second pulse of the Late Ordovician mass extinction occurred, after which Earth receded back into a much warmer climate during the Rhuddanian. Late Hirnantian warming was marked by a similarly meteoric shift in δ^{18}O towards more negative values. δ^{13}C values likewise fall sharply at the beginning of the Silurian.

=== Silurian glaciations ===
Following the relatively warm Rhuddanian, glacial events occurred during the early and latest Aeronian. A further glaciation occurred from the late Telychian to middle Sheinwoodian. From the early to late Homerian, Earth was in yet another glacial phase. The last major glaciation of the EPIA occurred during the Ludfordian and was associated with the Lau event.

During this period, glaciation is known from Arabia, Sahara, West Africa, the south Amazon, and the Andes, and the centre of glaciation is known to have migrated from the Sahara in the Ordovician (450–440 Mya) to South America in the Silurian (440–420 Mya). According to Eyles and Young, "A major glacial episode at c. 440 Ma, is recorded in Late Ordovician strata (predominantly Ashgillian) in West Africa (Tamadjert Formation of the Sahara), in Morocco (Tindouf Basin) and in west-central Saudi Arabia, all areas at polar latitudes at the time. From the Late Ordovician to the Early Silurian the centre of glaciation moved from northern Africa to southwestern South America." Continental glaciers developed in Africa and eastern Brazil, while alpine glaciers formed in the Andes. In western South America (Peru, Bolivia and northern Argentina) were found glacio-marine diamictites interbedded with turbidites, shales, mud flows and debris flows, dated as early Silurian (Llandonvery), with a southward extension into northern Argentina and western Paraguay, and with a probably northern extension into Peru, Ecuador and Colombia.

A major ice age, the Andean-Saharan was preceded by the Baykonurian glaciation, often referred to as a Snowball Earth, and followed by the Late Paleozoic icehouse.

== Evidence ==
=== Lithologic ===
- The sequence of the stratigraphic architecture of the Bighorn Dolomite (which represents end of the Ordovician period), is consistent with the gradual buildup of glacial ice. The sequences of the Bighorn Dolomite display systematic changes in their component cycles, and the changes in these cycles are interpreted as being a change from a greenhouse climate to a transitional ice house climate.

== Possible causes ==
=== Carbon dioxide depletion ===
One of the factors that hindered glaciation during the early Paleozoic was atmospheric Carbon dioxide concentrations, which at the time were somewhere between 8 and 20 times pre-industrial levels. However, solar irradiance was significantly lower during the Late Ordovician; 450 million years ago, solar irradiance of Earth was about 1,312 W m^{−2} compared to 1,360.89 W m^{−2} in the present day. Furthermore, Carbon dioxide concentrations are thought to have dropped significantly during the Hirnantian, which could have induced widespread glaciation during an overall cooling trend. Methods for the removal of Carbon dioxide during this time were not well known, and are still hotly debated, with the radiation of terrestrial plants, enhanced oceanic organic carbon burial, and a reduction in volcanic outgassing of carbon dioxide having been proposed. It could have been possible for glaciation to initiate with high levels of Carbon dioxide, but it would have depended highly on continental configuration.

==== Silicate weathering ====
Long-term silicate weathering is a major mechanism through which Carbon dioxide is removed from the atmosphere, converting it into bicarbonate which is stored in marine sediments. This has often been linked to the Taconic Orogeny, a mountain-building event on the east coast of Laurentia (present-day North America). Another hypothesis is that a hypothetical large igneous province in the Katian led to basaltic flooding caused by high continental volcanic activity during that period. In the short term, this would have released a large amount of Carbon dioxide into the atmosphere, which may explain a warming pulse in the Katian. However, in the long term flood basalts would have left behind plains of basaltic rock, replacing exposures of granitic rock. Basaltic rocks weather substantially faster than granitic rocks, which would quickly remove Carbon dioxide from the atmosphere at a much faster rate than before the volcanic activity. Carbon dioxide levels could also have decreased due to accelerated silicate weathering caused by the expansion of terrestrial non-vascular plants. Vascular plants only appeared 15 million years after the glaciation.

==== Organic carbon burial ====
Isotopic evidence points to a global Hirnantian positive shift in δ^{13}C at nearly the same time as the positive shift in marine carbonate δ^{18}O. This shift is known as the Hirnantian Isotopic Carbon Excursion (HICE). The positive shift in δ^{13}C implies a change in the carbon cycle leading to more burial of organic carbon, though some researchers hold a conflicting interpretation of this δ^{13}C change as being caused by increased weathering of carbonate platforms exposed by sea level fall. This enhanced organic carbon burial resulted in a decrease in the atmospheric Carbon dioxide levels and an inverse greenhouse effect, allowing glaciation to occur more readily.

==== Gamma-ray burst ====
A gamma-ray burst (GRB) has been suggested by some researchers as the cause of the abrupt glaciation at the beginning of the Hirnantian. The effects of a ten second GRB occurring within two kiloparsecs of Earth would have delivered it a fluence of 100 kilojoules per square metre. This would have resulted in large amounts of nitric acid raining down on Earth's surface in the aftermath of the gamma-ray burst, causing blooms of nitrate-limited photosynthesisers that would have sequestered large amounts of carbon dioxide from the atmosphere. Additionally, the GRB would have initiated a major depletion of ozone, another potent greenhouse gas, through its reaction with nitric oxide produced as a result of the GRB's dissociation of diatomic nitrogen and subsequent reaction of nitrogen atoms with oxygen.

=== Asteroid impact ===
==== Ordovician meteor event ====
The breakup of the L-chondrite parent body caused a rain of extraterrestrial material onto the Earth called the Ordovician meteor event. This event increased stratospheric dust by 3 or 4 orders of magnitude and may have triggered the ice age by reflecting sunlight back into space.

==== Deniliquin impact structure ====
A 2023 paper has proposed that the Hirnantian glaciation could have come about due to an impact winter generated by the impact that formed the Deniliquin multiple-ring feature in what is now southeastern Australia, although this hypothesis currently remains untested.

==== Debris ring ====
A 2024 study suggests that a planetary ring created by the disruption of an L chondrite asteroid passing within the Roche limit may have caused the cooling event. However, such a ring would have produced an abrupt cooling event, inconsistent with the long-term cooling trend observed in the geological records.

=== Volcanic aerosols ===
Although volcanic activity often leads to warming through the release of greenhouse gasses, it may also lead to cooling via the production of aerosols, light-blocking particles. There is good evidence for elevated volcanic activity through the Hirnantian, based on anomalously high concentrations of mercury (Hg) in many areas. Sulfur dioxide and other sulphurous volcanic gasses are converted into sulphate aerosols in the stratosphere, and short, periodic large igneous province eruptions may be able to account for cooling in this way. Although there is no direct evidence for a large igneous province during the Hirnantian, volcanism could still be a major factor. Explosive volcanic eruptions, which regularly send debris and volatiles into the stratosphere, would be even more effective at producing sulfate aerosols. Ash beds are common in the Late Ordovician, and Hirnantian pyrite records sulphur isotope anomalies consistent with stratospheric eruptions. The enormous megaeruption that formed the Deicke bentonite layer in particular has been linked to global cooling due to it coinciding with a major positive oxygen isotope excursion and the high sulphur concentration observed in its bentonite layer.

=== Sea level change ===
One of the possible causes for the temperature drop during this period is a drop in sea level. Sea level must drop prior to the initiation of extensive ice sheets in order for it to be a possible trigger. A drop in sea level allows more land to become available for ice sheet growth. There is wide debate on the timing of sea level change, but there is some evidence that a sea level drop started before the Ashgillian, which would have made it a contributing factor to glaciation.

=== Palaeogeography ===
The possible setup of the paleogeography during the period from around 460 to 440 million years ago falls in a range between the Caradocian and the Ashgillian. The choice of setup is important, because the Caradocian setup is more likely to produce glacial ice at high Carbon dioxide concentrations, and the Ashgillian is more likely to produce glacial ice at low Carbon dioxide concentrations.

The height of the land mass above sea level also plays an important role, especially after ice sheets have been established. A higher elevation allows ice sheets to remain with more stability, but a lower elevation allows ice sheets to develop more readily. The Caradocian is considered to have a lower surface elevation, and though it would be better for initiation during high Carbon dioxide, it would have a harder time maintaining glacial coverage.

From what we know about tectonic movement, the time span required to allow the southward movement of Gondwana toward the South Pole would have been too long to trigger this glaciation. Tectonic movement tends to take several million years, but the scale of the glaciation seems to have occurred in less than 1 million years, but the exact time frame of glaciation ranges from less than 1 million years to 35 million years, so it could still be possible for tectonic movement to have triggered this glacial period. Alternatively, true polar wander (TPW) and not conventional plate motion may have been responsible for the initiation of the Hirnantian glaciation. Palaeomagnetic data from between 450 and 440 million years ago indicates a TPW of around 50˚ occurring at a maximum speed of around 55 cm per year, which better explains the rapid motion of the continents than conventional plate tectonics.

==== Poleward ocean heat transport ====
Ocean heat transport is a major driver in the warming of the poles, taking warm water from the equator and distributing it to higher latitudes. A weakening of this heat transport may have allowed the poles to cool enough to form ice under high Carbon dioxide conditions. Due to the paleogeographic configuration of the continents, global ocean heat transport is thought to have been stronger in the Late Ordovician. However, research shows that in order for glaciation to occur, poleward heat transport had to be lower, which creates a discrepancy in what is known.

=== Orbital parameters ===
Orbital parameters may have acted in conjunction with some of the above parameters to help start glaciation. The variation of the earth's precession, and eccentricity, could have set the off the tipping point for initiation of glaciation. The Orbit at this time is thought to have been in a cold summer orbit for the Southern Hemisphere. This type of orbital configuration is a change in the orbital precession such that during the summer when the hemisphere is tilted toward the sun (in this case the earth) the earth is furthest away from the sun, and orbital eccentricity such that the orbit of the earth is more elongated which would enhance the effect of precession.

Coupled models have shown that in order to maintain ice at the pole in the Southern Hemisphere, the earth would have to be in a cold summer configuration. The glaciation was most likely to start during a cold summer period because this configuration enhances the chance of snow and ice surviving throughout the summer.

== End of the event ==
The cause for the end of the Late Ordovician Glaciation is a matter of intense research, but evidence shows that the deglaciation in the terminal Hirnantian may have occurred abruptly, as Silurian strata marks a significant change from the glacial deposits left during the Late Ordovician. Though the Hirnantian glaciation ended rapidly, milder glaciations continued to occur throughout the subsequent Silurian period, with the last glacial phase occurring in the Late Silurian.

=== Ice collapse ===
One of the possible causes for the end of the Hirnantian glaciation is that during the glacial maximum, the ice reached out too far and began collapsing on itself. The ice sheet initially stabilized once it reached as far north as Ghat, Libya and developed a large proglacial fan-delta system. A glaciotectonic fold and thrust belt began to form from repeated small-scale fluctuations in the ice. The glaciotectonic fold and thrust belt eventually led to ice sheet collapse and retreat of the ice to south of Ghat. Once stabilized south of Ghat, the ice sheet began advancing north again. This cycle slowly shrank more south each time which lead to further retreat and further collapse of glacial conditions. This recursion allowed the melting of the ice sheet, and rising sea level. This hypothesis is supported by glacial deposits and large land formations found in Ghat, Libya which is part of the Murzuq Basin.

=== Carbon dioxide ===
As the Ice sheets began to increase the weathering of silicate rocks and basaltic important to carbon sequestration (the silicates through the Carbonate–silicate cycle, the basalt through forming calcium carbonate) decreased, which caused Carbon dioxide levels to rise again, this in turned helped push deglaciation. This deglaciation cause the transformation of silicates exposed to the air (thus given the opportunity to bind to its Carbon dioxide) and weathering of basaltic rock to start back up which caused glaciation to occur again.

== Significance ==
Even before the mass extinction at the end of the Ordovician, which resulted in a significant drop in chitinozoan diversity and abundance, the biodiversity of chitinozoans was adversely impacted by the onset of the Andean-Saharan glaciation. Following a peak in diversity in the late Darriwilian, chitinozoans declined in diversity as the Late Ordovician progressed. An exception to this declining trend of chitinozoan diversity was exhibited in Laurentia due to its low latitude position and warmer climate.

The Late Ordovician Glaciation coincided with the second largest of the five major extinction events, known as the Late Ordovician mass extinction. This period is the only known glaciation to occur alongside of a mass extinction event. The extinction event consisted of two discrete pulses. The first pulse of extinctions is thought to have taken place because of the rapid cooling, and increased oxygenation of the water column. This first pulse was the larger of the two and caused the extinction of most of the marine animal species that existed in the shallow and deep oceans. The second phase of extinction was associated with strong sea level rise, and due to the atmospheric conditions, namely oxygen levels being at or below 50% of present-day levels, high levels of anoxic waters would have been common. This anoxia would have killed off many of the survivors of the first extinction pulse. In all the extinction event of the Late Ordovician saw a loss of 85% of marine animal species and 26% of animal families.

The deglaciation at the end of the Homerian glacial interval was coeval with the first major radiation of trilete spore-producing plants, harbingering the dawn of the Silurian-Devonian Terrestrial Revolution. The later middle Ludfordian glaciation caused a sea level drop that created vast areas of new terrestrial habitats that were promptly colonised by land plants, further facilitating their diversification. The warming during the Pridoli that marked the end of the Andean-Saharan glaciation saw further floral expansion.

== See also ==
- Timeline of glaciation
- Ordovician–Silurian extinction events
- Late Paleozoic icehouse
