= Tasmanian Passage =

Ocean waters between Australia and Antarctica

The Tasmanian Passage, also Tasmanian Gateway or Tasmanian Seaway, is the name of ocean waters between Australia and Antarctica.

It was formed from the separation of the two continental plates of Australia and Antarctica about 30 to 40 million years ago, and opened to water circulation around 33.5 Ma. The Tasman Passage connects the Indian Ocean with the Pacific Ocean south of Australia. The term comes from geology. The distance between the two continents is currently about 2,300 kilometres (1,400 mi).

Through the opening of the Drake Passage and the Tasmanian Passage, the Antarctic circumpolar current was able to form at the onset of the Oligocene, replacing the circumpacial equatorial flow conditions of the Cretaceous. The emergence of the circumpolar current led to a thermal isolation of the Antarctic, since the exchange with equatorial warm waters was greatly reduced. As a result, the ice sheets of Antarctica formed and the Earth entered the Late Cenozoic Ice Age (the current ice age).
