= Late Ordovician mass extinction =

Mass extinction event c. 444 million years ago

The blue graph shows the apparent percentage (not the absolute number) of marine animal genera becoming extinct during any given time interval. It does not represent all marine species, just those that are readily fossilized. The labels of the traditional "Big Five" extinction events and the more recently recognised Capitanian mass extinction event are clickable links; see Extinction event for more details. (source and image info)

The Late Ordovician mass extinction (LOME), sometimes referred to as the end-Ordovician mass extinction or the Ordovician–Silurian extinction, is the first of the "big five" major mass extinction events in Earth's history, occurring roughly 445 million years ago (Ma). It is often considered to be the second-largest-known extinction event, behind only the end-Permian mass extinction, in terms of the percentage of genera that became extinct. Extinction was global during this interval, eliminating 49–60% of marine genera and nearly 85% of marine species. Under most tabulations, only the Permian–Triassic mass extinction exceeds the Late Ordovician mass extinction in biodiversity loss. The extinction event had a profound impact on all major contemporary taxonomic groups; it caused the disappearance of one third of all brachiopod and bryozoan families, as well as numerous groups of conodonts, trilobites, echinoderms, corals, bivalves and graptolites. Despite its taxonomic severity, the Late Ordovician mass extinction did not produce major changes to ecosystem structures compared to other mass extinctions, nor did it lead to any particular morphological innovations. Diversity gradually recovered to pre-extinction levels over the first 5 million years of the Silurian period.

The Late Ordovician mass extinction is traditionally considered to occur in two distinct pulses. The first pulse (interval), known as LOMEI-1, began at the boundary between the Katian and Hirnantian stages of the Late Ordovician epoch. This extinction pulse is typically attributed to the Late Ordovician glaciation, which abruptly expanded over Gondwana at the beginning of the Hirnantian and shifted the Earth from a greenhouse to icehouse climate. Cooling and a falling sea level brought on by the glaciation led to habitat loss for many organisms along the continental shelves, especially endemic taxa with restricted temperature tolerance and latitudinal range. During this extinction pulse, there were also several marked changes in biologically responsive carbon and oxygen isotopes. Marine life partially rediversified during the cold period and a new cold-water ecosystem, the "Hirnantia fauna", was established.

The second pulse (interval) of extinction, referred to as LOMEI-2, occurred in the later half of the Hirnantian as the glaciation abruptly receded and warm conditions returned. The second pulse was associated with intense worldwide anoxia (oxygen depletion) and euxinia (toxic sulfide production), which persisted into the subsequent Rhuddanian stage of the Silurian period.

Some researchers have proposed the existence of a third distinct pulse of the mass extinction during the early Rhuddanian, evidenced by a negative carbon isotope excursion and a pulse of anoxia into shelf environments amidst already low background oxygen levels. Others, however, have argued that Rhuddanian anoxia was simply part of the second pulse, which according to this view was longer and more drawn out than most authors suggest.

== Impact on life ==
=== Ecological impacts ===
The Late Ordovician mass extinction followed the Great Ordovician Biodiversification Event (GOBE), one of the largest surges of increasing biodiversity in the geological and biological history of the Earth. At the time of the extinction, most complex multicellular organisms lived in the sea, and the only evidence of life on land are rare spores from small early land plants.

At the time of the extinction, around 100 marine families became extinct, covering about 49% of genera (a more reliable estimate than species). The brachiopods and bryozoans were strongly impacted, along with many of the trilobite, conodont and graptolite families. The extinction was divided into two major extinction pulses. The first pulse occurred at the base of the global Metabolograptus extraordinarius graptolite biozone, which marks the end of the Katian stage and the start of the Hirnantian stage. The second pulse of extinction occurred in the later part of the Hirnantian stage, coinciding with the Metabolograptus persculptus zone. Each extinction pulse affected different groups of animals and was followed by a rediversification event. Statistical analysis of marine losses at this time suggests that the decrease in diversity was mainly caused by a sharp increase in extinctions, rather than a decrease in speciation.

Following such a major loss of diversity, Silurian communities were initially less complex and broader niched. Nonetheless, in South China, warm-water benthic communities with complex trophic webs thrived immediately following LOME. Highly endemic faunas, which characterized the Late Ordovician, were replaced by faunas that were amongst the most cosmopolitan in the Phanerozoic, biogeographic patterns that persisted throughout most of the Silurian. LOME had few of the long-term ecological impacts associated with the Permian–Triassic and Cretaceous–Paleogene extinction events. Furthermore, biotic recovery from LOME proceeded at a much faster rate than it did after the Permian–Triassic extinction. Nevertheless, a large number of taxa disappeared from the Earth over a short time interval, eliminating and altering the relative diversity and abundance of certain groups. The Cambrian-type evolutionary fauna nearly died out, and was unable to rediversify after the extinction.

=== Biodiversity changes in marine invertebrates ===
==== Brachiopods ====
Brachiopod diversity and composition was strongly affected, with the Cambrian-type inarticulate brachiopods (linguliforms and craniiforms) never recovering their pre-extinction diversity. Articulate (rhynchonelliform) brachiopods, part of the Paleozoic evolutionary fauna, were more variable in their response to the extinction. Some early rhynchonelliform groups, such as the Orthida and Strophomenida, declined significantly. Others, including the Pentamerida, Athyridida, Spiriferida and Atrypida, were less affected and took the opportunity to diversify after the extinction. Additionally, brachiopods with higher abundance were more likely to survive.

The extinction pulse at the end of the Katian was selective in its effects, disproportionally affecting deep-water species and tropical endemics inhabiting epicontinental seas. The Foliomena fauna, an assemblage of thin-shelled species adapted for deep dysoxic (low oxygen) waters, went extinct completely in the first extinction pulse. The Foliomena fauna was formerly widespread and resistant to background extinction rates prior to the Hirnantian, so their unexpected extinction points towards the abrupt loss of their specific habitat. During the glaciation, a high-latitude brachiopod assemblage, the Hirnantia fauna, established itself along outer shelf environments in lower latitudes, probably in response to cooling. However, the Hirnantia fauna would meet its demise in the second extinction pulse, replaced by Silurian-style assemblages adapted for warmer waters.

The brachiopod survival intervals following the second pulse spanned the terminal Hirnantian to the middle Rhuddanian, after which the recovery interval began and lasted until the early Aeronian. Overall, the brachiopod recovery in the late Rhuddanian was rapid. Brachiopod survivors of the mass extinction tended to be endemic to one palaeoplate or even one locality in the survival interval in the earliest Silurian, though their ranges geographically expanded over the course of the biotic recovery. The region around what is today Oslo was a hotbed of atrypide rediversification. Brachiopod recovery consisted mainly of the reestablishment of cosmopolitan brachiopod taxa from the Late Ordovician. Progenitor taxa that arose following the mass extinction displayed numerous novel adaptations for resisting environmental stresses. Although some brachiopods did experience the Lilliput effect in response to the extinction, this phenomenon was not particularly widespread compared to other mass extinctions.

==== Trilobites ====
Trilobites were hit hard by both phases of the extinction, with about 70% of genera and 50% of families going extinct between the Katian and Silurian. The extinction disproportionately affected deep water species and groups with fully planktonic larvae or adults. The order Agnostida was completely wiped out, and the formerly diverse Asaphida survived with only a single genus, Raphiophorus. A cool-water trilobite assemblage, the Mucronaspis fauna, coincides with the Hirnantia brachiopod fauna in the timing of its expansion and demise. Trilobite faunas after the extinction were dominated by families that appeared in the Ordovician and survived LOME, such as Encrinuridae and Odontopleuridae.

==== Bryozoans ====
Over a third of bryozoan genera went extinct, but most families survived the extinction interval and the group as a whole recovered in the Silurian. The hardest-hit subgroups were the cryptostomes and trepostomes, which never recovered the full extent of their Ordovician diversity. Bryozoan extinctions started in coastal regions of Laurentia, before high extinction rates shifted to Baltica by the end of the Hirnantian. Bryozoan biodiversity loss appears to have been a prolonged process which partially preceded the Hirnantian extinction pulses. Extinction rates among Ordovician bryozoan genera were actually higher in the early and late Katian, and origination rates sharply dropped in the late Katian and Hirnantian.

==== Echinoderms ====
About 70% of crinoid genera died out. Early studies of crinoid biodiversity loss by Jack Sepkoski overestimated crinoid biodiversity losses during LOME. Most extinctions occurred in the first pulse. However, they rediversified quickly in tropical areas and reacquired their pre-extinction diversity not long into the Silurian. Many other echinoderms became very rare after the Ordovician, such as the cystoids, edrioasteroids and other early crinoid-like groups.

==== Sponges ====
Stromatoporoid generic and familial taxonomic diversity was not significantly impacted by the mass extinction. A change in abundance is recorded, however; clathrodictyids increased in abundance relative to labechiids. Sponges thrived and dominated marine ecosystems in South China immediately after the extinction event, colonising depauperate, anoxic environments in the earliest Rhuddanian. Their pervasiveness in marine environments after the biotic crisis has been attributed to drastically decreased competition and an abundance of vacant niches left behind by organisms that perished in the catastrophe. Sponges may have assisted the recovery of other sessile suspension feeders: by helping stabilise sediment surfaces, they enabled bryozoans, brachiopods and corals to recolonise the seafloor.

== Glaciation and cooling ==
The first pulse of the Late Ordovician Extinction has typically been attributed to the Late Ordovician glaciation, which is unusual among mass extinctions and has made LOME an outlier. Although there was a longer cooling trend in Middle and Lower Ordovician, the most severe and abrupt period of glaciation occurred in the Hirnantian stage, which was bracketed by both pulses of the extinction. The rapid continental glaciation was centered on Gondwana, which was located at the South Pole in the Late Ordovician. The Hirnantian glaciation is considered one of the most severe ice ages of the Paleozoic, which previously maintained the relatively warm climate conditions of a greenhouse earth.

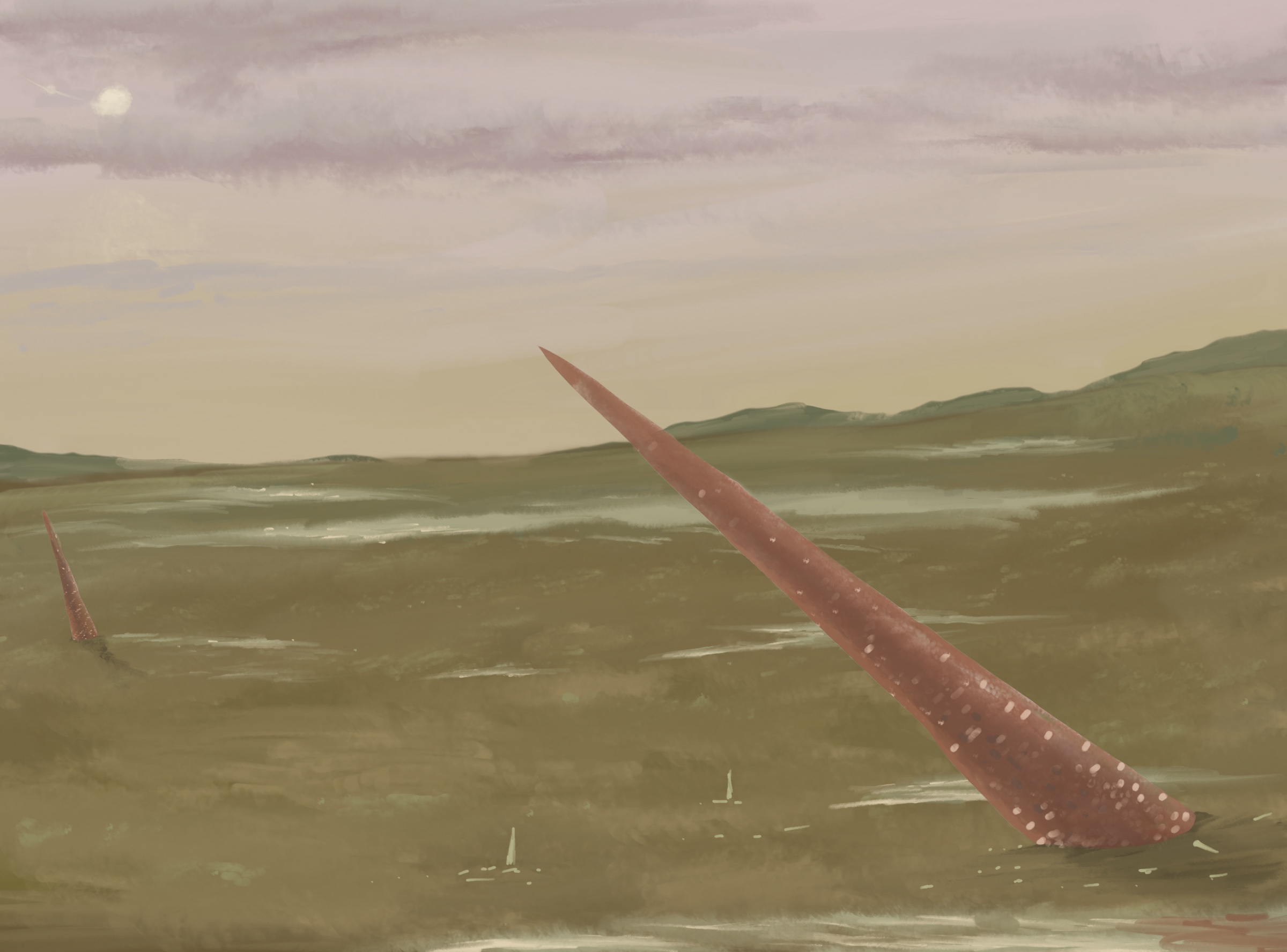
An illustration depicting Cameroceras shells sticking out of the mud as a result of draining seaways during the Ordovician–Silurian extinction event

The cause of the glaciation is heavily debated. The late Ordovician glaciation was preceded by a fall in atmospheric carbon dioxide (from 7,000 ppm to 4,400 ppm). Atmospheric and oceanic CO_{2} levels may have fluctuated with the growth and decay of Gondwanan glaciation. The appearance and development of terrestrial plants and microphytoplankton, which consumed atmospheric carbon dioxide, may have diminished the greenhouse effect and promoted the transition of the climatic system to the glacial mode. Heavy silicate weathering of the uplifting Appalachians and Caledonides occurred during the Late Ordovician, which sequestered CO_{2}. In the Hirnantian stage the volcanism diminished, and the continued weathering caused a significant and rapid draw down of CO_{2} coincident with the rapid and short ice age. As Earth cooled and sea levels dropped, highly weatherable carbonate platforms became exposed above water, enkindling a positive feedback loop of inorganic carbon sequestration. A hypothetical large igneous province emplaced during the Katian whose existence is unproven has been speculated to have been the sink that absorbed carbon dioxide and precipitated Hirnantian cooling. Alternatively, volcanic activity may have caused the cooling by supplying sulphur aerosols to the atmosphere and generating severe volcanic winters that triggered a runaway ice-albedo positive feedback loop. In addition, volcanic fertilisation of the oceans with phosphorus may have increased populations of photosynthetic algae and enhanced biological sequestration of carbon dioxide from the atmosphere. Increased burial of organic carbon is another method of drawing down carbon dioxide from the air that may have played a role in the Late Ordovician. Other studies point to an asteroid strike and impact winter as the culprit for the glaciation. True polar wander and the associated rapid palaeogeographic changes have also been proposed as a cause. Other studies have even suggested that shading of the sun's rays by a temporary planetary ring formed from the partial breakup of a large meteor in the atmosphere may have caused the glaciation, which would also link it to the Ordovician meteor event.

Two environmental changes associated with the glaciation were responsible for much of the Late Ordovician extinction. First, the cooling global climate was probably especially detrimental because the biota were adapted to an intense greenhouse, especially because most shallow sea habitats in the Ordovician were located in the tropics. The southward shift of the polar front severely contracted the available latitudinal range of warm-adapted organisms. Second, sea level decline, caused by sequestering of water in the ice cap, drained the vast epicontinental seaways and eliminated the habitat of many endemic communities. The dispersed positions of the continents, in contrast to their position during the much less extinction-inducing Pleistocene glaciations, made glacioeustatic marine regression especially hazardous to marine life. Falling sea levels may have acted as a positive feedback loop accelerating further cooling; as shallow seas receded, carbonate-shelf production declined and atmospheric carbon dioxide levels correspondingly decreased, fostering even more cooling.

Ice caps formed on the southern supercontinent Gondwana as it drifted over the South Pole. Correlating rock strata have been detected in Late Ordovician rock strata of North Africa and then-adjacent northeastern South America, which were south-polar locations at the time. Glaciation locks up water from the world-ocean and interglacials free it, causing sea levels repeatedly to drop and rise; the vast, shallow Ordovician seas withdrew, which eliminated many ecological niches, then returned, carrying diminished founder populations lacking many whole families of organisms. Then they withdrew again with the next pulse of glaciation, eliminating biological diversity at each change. In the North African strata, five pulses of glaciation from seismic sections are recorded. In the Yangtze Platform, a relict warm-water fauna continued to persist because South China blocked the transport of cold waters from Gondwanan waters at higher latitudes.

This incurred a shift in the location of bottom water formation, shifting from low latitudes, characteristic of greenhouse conditions, to high latitudes, characteristic of icehouse conditions, which was accompanied by increased deep-ocean currents and oxygenation of the bottom water. An opportunistic fauna briefly thrived there, before anoxic conditions returned. The breakdown in the oceanic circulation patterns brought up nutrients from the abyssal waters. Surviving species were those that coped with the changed conditions and filled the ecological niches left by the extinctions.

However, not all studies agree that cooling and glaciation caused LOMEI-1. One study suggests that the first pulse began not during the rapid Hirnantian ice cap expansion but in an interval of deglaciation following it.

== Anoxia and euxinia ==
Another heavily-discussed factor in the Late Ordovician mass extinction is anoxia, the absence of dissolved oxygen in seawater. Anoxia not only deprives most life forms of a vital component of respiration, it also encourages the formation of toxic metal ions and other compounds. One of the most common of these poisonous chemicals is hydrogen sulfide, a biological waste product and major component of the sulfur cycle. Oxygen depletion when combined with high levels of sulfide is called euxinia. Though less toxic, ferrous iron (Fe^{2+}) is another substance which commonly forms in anoxic waters. Anoxia is the most common culprit for the second pulse of the Late Ordovician mass extinction and is connected to many other mass extinctions throughout geological time. It may have also had a role in the first pulse of the Late Ordovician mass extinction, though support for this hypothesis is inconclusive and contradicts other evidence for high oxygen levels in seawater during the glaciation.

=== Early Hirnantian anoxia ===
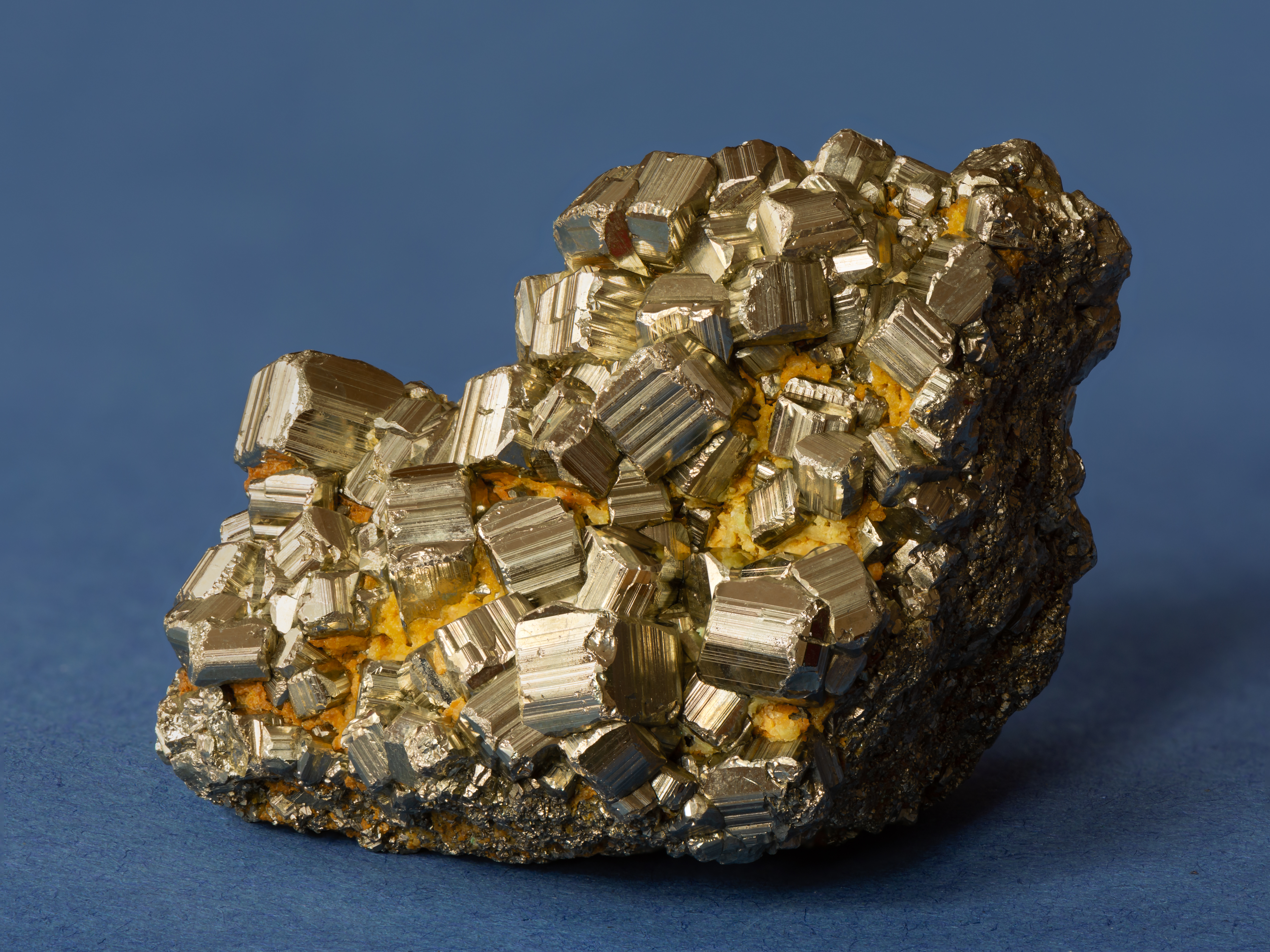
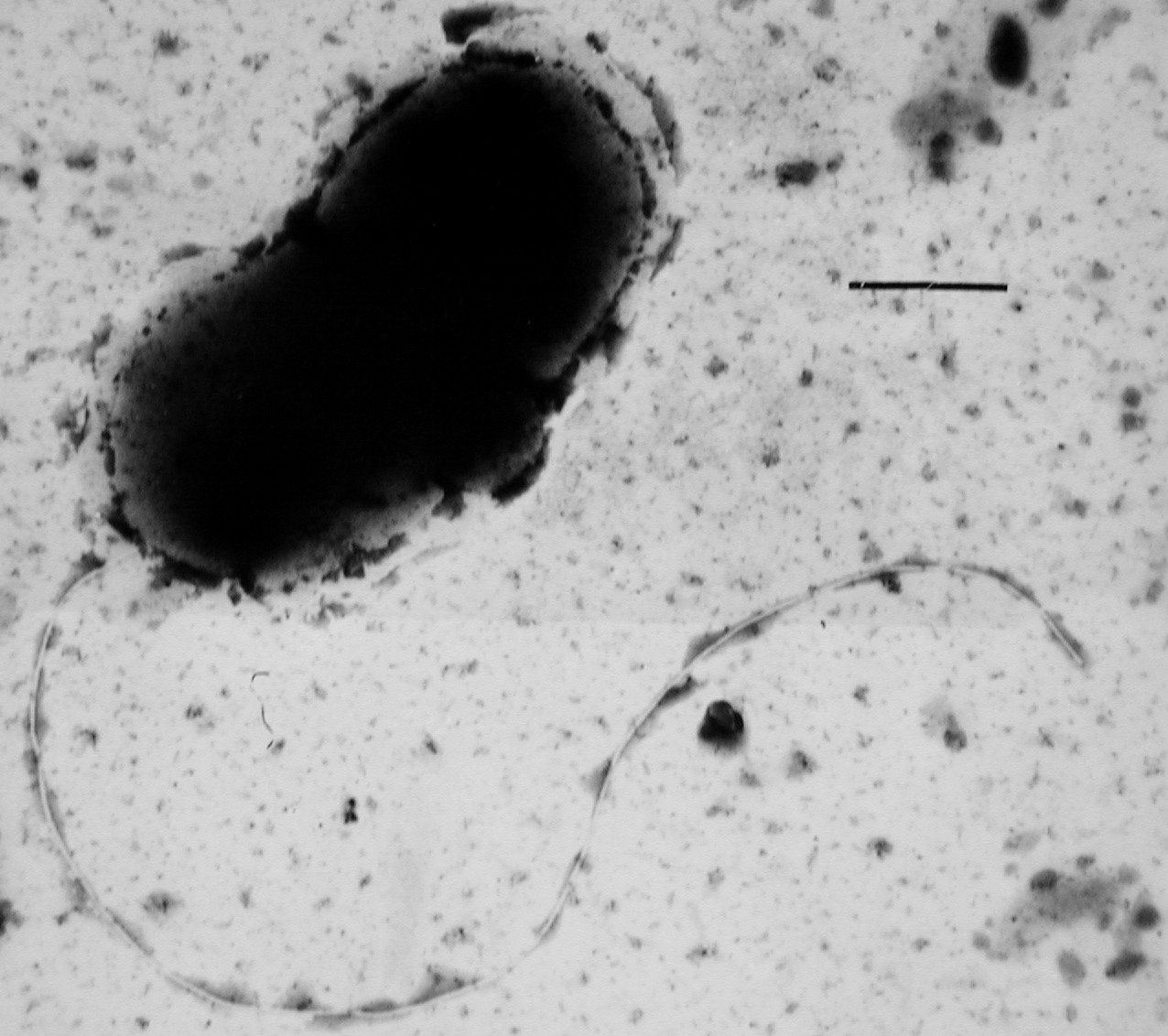
An excursion in the δ^{34}S ratio of pyrite (top) has been attributed to widespread deep-sea anoxia during the Hirnantian glaciation. However, sulfate-reducing bacteria (bottom) could instead have been responsible for the excursion without contributing to anoxia.

Some geologists have argued that anoxia played a role in the first extinction pulse, though this hypothesis is controversial. In the early Hirnantian, shallow-water sediments throughout the world experience a large positive excursion in the δ^{34}S ratio of buried pyrite. This ratio indicates that shallow-water pyrite which formed at the beginning of the glaciation had a decreased proportion of ^{32}S, a common lightweight isotope of sulfur. ^{32}S in the seawater could hypothetically be used up by extensive deep-sea pyrite deposition. The Ordovician ocean also had very low levels of sulfate, a nutrient which would otherwise resupply ^{32}S from the land. Pyrite forms most easily in anoxic and euxinic environments, while better oxygenation encourages the formation of gypsum instead. As a result, anoxia and euxinia would need to be common in the deep sea to produce enough pyrite to shift the δ^{34}S ratio.

Thallium isotope ratios can also be used as indicators of anoxia. A major positive ε^{205}Tl excursion in the late Katian, just before the Katian–Hirnantian boundary, likely reflects a global enlargement of oxygen minimum zones. During the late Katian, thallium isotopic perturbations indicating proliferation of anoxic waters notably preceded the appearance of other geochemical indicators of the expansion of anoxia.

A more direct proxy for anoxic conditions is Fe_{HR}/Fe_{T}. This ratio describes the comparative abundance of highly reactive iron compounds which are only stable without oxygen. Most geological sections corresponding to the beginning of the Hirnantian glaciation have Fe_{HR}/Fe_{T} below 0.38, indicating oxygenated waters. However, higher Fe_{HR}/Fe_{T} values are known from a few deep-water early Hirnantian sequences found in China and Nevada. Elevated Fe_{Py}/Fe_{HR} values have also been found in association with LOMEI-1, including ones above 0.8 that are tell-tale indicators of euxinia.

Glaciation could conceivably trigger anoxic conditions, albeit indirectly. If continental shelves are exposed by falling sea levels, then organic surface runoff flows into deeper oceanic basins. The organic matter would have more time to leach out phosphate and other nutrients before being deposited on the seabed. Increased phosphate concentration in the seawater would lead to eutrophication and then anoxia. Deep-water anoxia and euxinia would impact deep-water benthic fauna, as expected for the first pulse of extinction. Chemical cycle disturbances would also steepen the chemocline, restricting the habitable zone of planktonic fauna which also go extinct in the first pulse. This scenario is congruent with both organic carbon isotope excursions and general extinction patterns observed in the first pulse.

However, data supporting deep-water anoxia during the glaciation contrasts with more extensive evidence for well-oxygenated waters. Black shales, which are indicative of an anoxic environment, become very rare in the early Hirnantian compared to surrounding time periods. Although early Hirnantian black shales can be found in a few isolated ocean basins (such as the Yangtze platform of China), from a worldwide perspective these correspond to local events. Some Chinese sections record an early Hirnantian increase in the abundance of Mo-98, a heavy isotope of molybdenum. This shift can correspond to a balance between minor local anoxia and well-oxygenated waters on a global scale. Other trace elements point towards increased deep-sea oxygenation at the start of the glaciation. Oceanic current modelling suggest that glaciation would have encouraged oxygenation in most areas, apart from the Paleo-Tethys Ocean. Devastation of the Dicranograptidae-Diplograptidae-Orthograptidae (DDO) graptolite fauna, which was well adapted to anoxic conditions, further suggests that LOMEI-1 was associated with increased oxygenation of the water column and not the other way around.

Deep-sea anoxia is not the only explanation for the δ^{34}S excursion of pyrite. Carbonate-associated sulfate maintains high ^{32}S levels, indicating that seawater in general did not experience ^{32}S depletion during the glaciation. Even if pyrite burial did increase at that time, its chemical effects would have been far too slow to explain the rapid excursion or extinction pulse. Instead, cooling may lower the metabolism of warm-water aerobic bacteria, reducing decomposition of organic matter. Fresh organic matter would eventually sink down and supply nutrients to sulfate-reducing microbes living in the seabed. Sulfate-reducing microbes prioritize ^{32}S during anaerobic respiration, leaving behind heavier isotopes. A bloom of sulfate-reducing microbes can quickly account for the δ^{34}S excursion in marine sediments without a corresponding decrease in oxygen.

A few studies have proposed that the first extinction pulse did not begin with the Hirnantian glaciation, but instead corresponds to an interglacial period or other warming event. Anoxia would be the most likely mechanism of extinction in a warming event, as evidenced by other extinctions involving warming. However, this view of the first extinction pulse is controversial and not widely accepted.

=== Late Hirnantian anoxia ===
The late Hirnantian experienced a dramatic increase in the abundance of black shales. Coinciding with the retreat of the Hirnantian glaciation, black shale expands out of isolated basins to become the dominant oceanic sediment at all latitudes and depths. The worldwide distribution of black shales in the late Hirnantian is indicative of a global anoxic event, which has been termed the Hirnantian ocean anoxic event (HOAE). Corresponding to widespread anoxia are δ^{34}S_{CAS}, δ^{98}Mo, δ^{238}U, and εNd(t) excursions found in many different regions. At least in European sections, late Hirnantian anoxic waters were originally ferruginous (dominated by ferrous iron) before gradually becoming more euxinic. In the Yangtze Sea, located on the western margins of the South China microcontinent, the second extinction pulse occurred alongside intense euxinia which spread out from the middle of the continental shelf. Mercury loading in South China during LOMEI-2 was likely related to euxinia. However, some evidence suggests that the top of the water column in the Ordovician oceans remained well oxygenated even as the seafloor became deoxygenated. On a global scale, euxinia was probably one or two orders of magnitude more prevalent than in the modern day. Global anoxia may have lasted more than 3 million years, persisting through the entire Rhuddanian stage of the Silurian period. This would make the Hirnantian–Rhuddanian anoxia one of the longest-lasting anoxic events in geologic time.

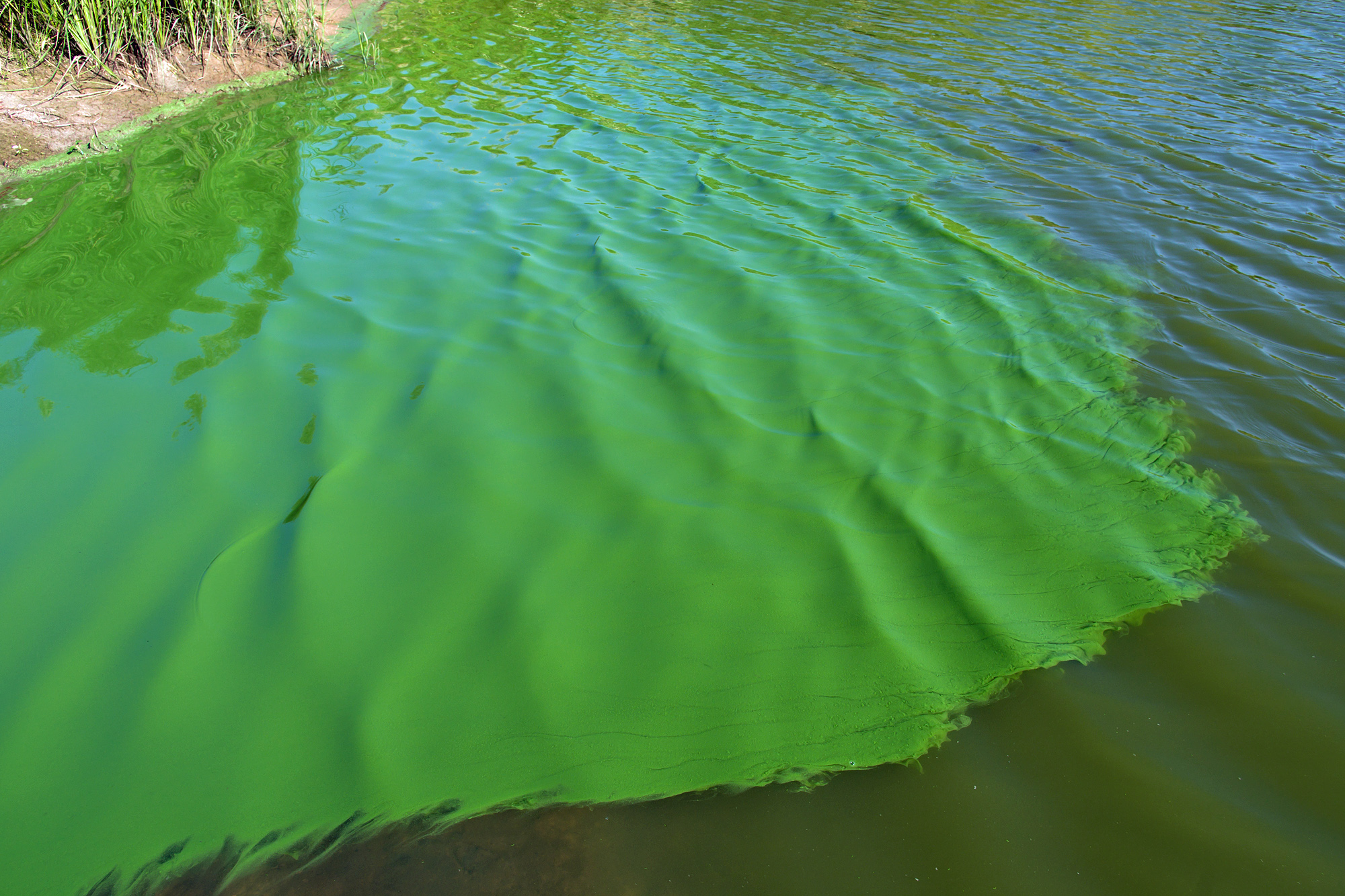
Cyanobacteria blooms after the Hirnantian glaciation likely caused the Hirnantian–Rhuddanian global anoxic event, the main factor behind the second extinction pulse.

The cause of the Hirnantian–Rhuddanian anoxic event is uncertain. Like most global anoxic events, an increased supply of nutrients (such as nitrates and phosphates) would encourage algal or microbial blooms that deplete oxygen levels in the seawater. The most likely culprits are cyanobacteria, which can use nitrogen fixation to produce usable nitrogen compounds in the absence of nitrates. Nitrogen isotopes during the anoxic event record-high rates of denitrification, a biological process which depletes nitrates. The Nitrogen-fixing ability of cyanobacteria would give them an edge over inflexible competitors like eukaryotic algae. At Anticosti Island, a uranium isotope excursion consistent with anoxia actually occurs prior to indicators of receding glaciation. This may suggest that the Hirnantian–Rhuddanian anoxic event (and its corresponding extinction) began during the glaciation, not after it. Cool temperatures can lead to upwelling, cycling nutrients into productive surface waters via air and ocean cycles. Upwelling could instead be encouraged by increasing oceanic stratification through an input of freshwater from melting glaciers. This would be more reasonable if the anoxic event coincided with the end of glaciation, as supported by most other studies. However, oceanic models argue that marine currents would recover too quickly for freshwater disruptions to have a meaningful effect on nutrient cycles. Retreating glaciers could expose more land to weathering, which would be a more sustained source of phosphates flowing into the ocean. There is also evidence implicating volcanism as a contributor to Late Hirnantian anoxia.

There were few clear patterns of extinction associated with the second extinction pulse. Every region and marine environment experienced the second extinction pulse to some extent. Many taxa which survived or diversified after the first pulse were finished off in the second pulse. These include the Hirnantia brachiopod fauna and Mucronaspis trilobite fauna, which previously thrived in the cold glacial period. Other taxa such as graptolites and warm-water reef denizens were less affected. Sediments from China and Baltica seemingly show a more gradual replacement of the Hirnantia fauna after glaciation. Although this suggests that the second extinction pulse may have been a minor event at best, other paleontologists maintain that an abrupt ecological turnover accompanied the end of glaciation. There may be a correlation between the relatively slow recovery after the second extinction pulse, and the prolonged nature of the anoxic event which accompanied it. On the other hand, the occurrence of euxinic pulses similar in magnitude to LOMEI-2 during the Katian without ensuing biological collapses has caused some researchers to question whether euxinia alone could have been LOMEI-2's driver.

=== Early Rhuddanian anoxia ===
Deposition of black graptolite shales continued to be common into the earliest Rhuddanian, indicating that anoxia persisted well into the Llandovery. A sharp reduction in the average size of many organisms, likely attributable to the Lilliput effect, and the disappearance of many relict taxa from the Ordovician indicate a third extinction interval linked to an expansion of anoxic conditions into shallower shelf environments, particularly in Baltica. This sharp decline in dissolved oxygen concentrations was likely linked to a period of global warming documented by a negative carbon isotope excursion preserved in Baltican sediments.

== Other potential factors ==
=== Metal poisoning ===
Toxic metals on the ocean floor may have dissolved into the water when the oceans' oxygen was depleted. An increase in available nutrients in the oceans may have been a factor, and decreased ocean circulation caused by global cooling may also have been a factor. Hg/TOC values from the Peri-Baltic region indicate noticeable spikes in mercury concentrations during the lower late Katian, the Katian–Hirnantian boundary, and the late Hirnantian.

The toxic metals may have killed life forms in lower trophic levels of the food chain, causing a decline in population, and subsequently resulting in starvation for the dependent higher feeding life forms in the chain.

=== Gamma-ray burst ===
In 2003, a team of authors led by physicist Adrian Lewis Melott proposed an extraterrestrial cause for the first extinction pulse. They suggested that the initial extinctions could have been caused by a gamma-ray burst originating from a hypernova in a nearby arm of the Milky Way galaxy, within 6,000 light-years of Earth. A ten-second burst would have stripped the Earth's atmosphere of half of its ozone almost immediately, exposing surface-dwelling organisms, including those responsible for planetary photosynthesis, to high levels of extreme ultraviolet radiation. Under this hypothesis, several groups of marine organisms with a planktonic lifestyle were more exposed to more UV radiation than groups that lived on the seabed. It is estimated that 20% to 60% of the total phytoplankton biomass on Earth would have been killed in such an event because the oceans were mostly oligotrophic and clear during the Late Ordovician. This is consistent with observations that planktonic organisms suffered severely during the first extinction pulse. In addition, species dwelling in shallow water were more likely to become extinct than species dwelling in deep water, also consistent with the hypothetical effects of a galactic gamma-ray burst.

A gamma-ray burst could also explain the rapid expansion of glaciers, since the high energy rays would cause ozone, a greenhouse gas, to dissociate and its dissociated oxygen atoms to then react with nitrogen to form nitrogen dioxide, a darkly coloured aerosol which cools the planet. It would also cohere with the major δ13C isotopic excursion indicating increased sequestration of carbon-12 out of the atmosphere, which would have occurred as a result of the nitrogen dioxide reacting with hydroxyl and raining back down to Earth as nitric acid, precipitating large quantities of nitrates that would have enhanced wetland productivity and sequestration of carbon dioxide.

Although the gamma-ray burst hypothesis is consistent with some patterns at the onset of extinction, there is no unambiguous evidence that such a nearby gamma-ray burst ever happened, and the same patterns can be explained through earth-based processes.

=== Volcanism ===
Though more commonly associated with greenhouse gases and global warming, volcanoes may have cooled the planet and precipitated glaciation by discharging sulphur into the atmosphere. This is supported by a positive uptick in pyritic Δ^{33}S values, a geochemical signal of volcanic sulphur discharge, coeval with LOMEI-1.

More recently, in May 2020, a study suggested the first pulse of mass extinction was caused by volcanism which induced global warming and anoxia, rather than cooling and glaciation. Higher resolution of species diversity patterns in the Late Ordovician suggest that extinction rates rose significantly in the early or middle Katian stage, several million years earlier than the Hirnantian glaciation. This early phase of extinction is associated with large igneous province (LIP) activity, possibly that of the Alborz LIP of northern Iran, as well as a warming phase known as the Boda event. However, other research still suggests the Boda event was a cooling event instead.

Increased volcanic activity during the early late Katian and around the Katian–Hirnantian boundary is also implied by heightened mercury concentrations relative to total organic carbon. Marine bentonite layers associated with the subduction of the Junggar Ocean underneath the Yili Block have been dated to the late Katian, close to the Katian–Hirnantian boundary.

Volcanic activity could also provide a plausible explanation for anoxia during the first pulse of the mass extinction. A volcanic input of phosphorus, which was insufficient to enkindle persistent anoxia on its own, may have triggered a positive feedback loop of phosphorus recycling from marine sediments, sustaining widespread marine oxygen depletion over the course of LOMEI-1. Also, the weathering of nutrient-rich volcanic rocks emplaced during the middle and late Katian likely enhanced the reduction in dissolved oxygen. Intense volcanism also fits in well with the attribution of euxinia as the main driver of LOMEI-2; sudden volcanism at the Ordovician–Silurian boundary is suggested to have supplied abundant sulphur dioxide, greatly facilitating the development of euxinia.

Other papers have criticised the volcanism hypothesis, claiming that volcanic activity was relatively low in the Ordovician and that superplume and LIP volcanic activity is especially unlikely to have caused the mass extinction at the end of the Ordovician. A 2022 study argued against a volcanic cause of LOME, citing the lack of mercury anomalies and the discordance between deposition of bentonites and redox changes in drillcores from South China straddling the Ordovician–Silurian boundary. Mercury anomalies at the end of the Ordovician relative to total organic carbon, or Hg/TOC, that some researchers have attributed to large-scale volcanism have been reinterpreted by some to be flawed because the main mercury host in the Ordovician was sulphide, and thus Hg/TS should be used instead; Hg/TS values show no evidence of volcanogenic mercury loading, a finding bolstered by ∆^{199}Hg measurements much higher than would be expected for volcanogenic mercury input.

=== Asteroid impact ===
A 2023 paper draws attention to the Deniliquin multiple-ring feature in southeastern Australia, which has been dated to around the start of LOMEI-1, as a potential catalyst for the intense Hirnantian glaciation and the first pulse of the extinction event. According to the paper, further research is necessary to evaluate the hypothesis.

== See also ==
- Global catastrophic risk
- Near-Earth supernova
- Anoxic event
- Late Devonian mass extinction
- Capitanian mass extinction event
- Permian–Triassic extinction event
- Triassic–Jurassic extinction event
- Cretaceous–Paleogene extinction event
- Hirnantian glaciation
