= Cretaceous =

Third and last period of the Mesozoic Era

- 143.1 ± 0.6 – 66.0 Ma
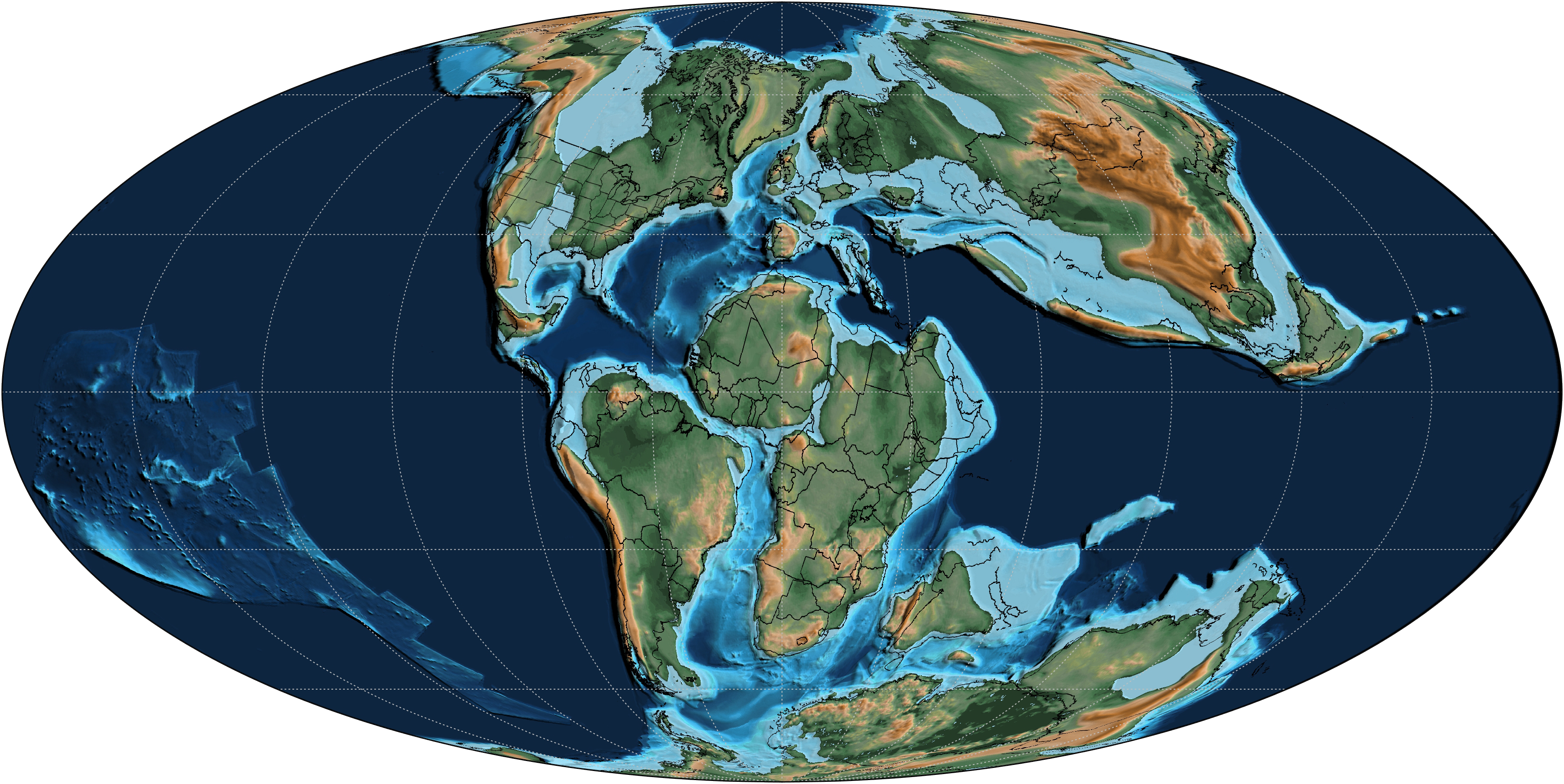
- A paleomap of Earth as it appeared 105 million years ago during the Early Cretaceous Epoch (Albian Age)

Chronology
← / K-Pg mass extinction
Subdivision of the Cretaceous according to the ICS, as of 2024. Vertical axis scale: Millions of years ago

Etymology
- Name formality: Formal

Usage information
- Celestial body: Earth
- Regional usage: Global (ICS)
- Time scale(s) used: ICS Time Scale

Definition
- Chronological unit: Period
- Stratigraphic unit: System
- Time span formality: Formal
- Lower boundary definition: Not formally defined
- Lower boundary definition candidates: Magnetic—base of Chron M18r; Base of Calpionellid zone B; FAD of Ammonite Berriasella jacobi
- Lower boundary GSSP candidate section(s): None
- Upper boundary definition: Iridium-enriched layer associated with a major meteorite impact and subsequent K-Pg extinction event
- Upper boundary GSSP: El Kef Section, El Kef, Tunisia; 36.1537°N 8.6486°E
- Upper GSSP ratified: 1991

The Cretaceous (IPA: /krɪˈteɪʃəs/ krih-TAY-shəss) is a geological period that lasted from about 143.1 to 66 Ma (million years ago). It is the third and final period of the Mesozoic Era, as well as the longest. At around 77.1 million years, it is the ninth and longest geological period of the entire Phanerozoic. The name is derived from Latin creta 'chalk', which is abundant in deposits from the latter half of the period. It is usually abbreviated K, for its German translation Kreide.

The Cretaceous was a period with a relatively warm climate, resulting in high eustatic sea levels that created numerous shallow inland seas. These oceans and seas were populated with now-extinct marine reptiles, ammonites and rudists, while on land, dinosaurs continued to dominate. The world was largely ice-free – although there is some evidence of brief periods of glaciation during the cooler first half – and forests extended to the poles.

Many of the dominant taxonomic groups present in modern times can be ultimately traced back to origins in the Cretaceous. During this time, new groups of mammals and birds appeared, including the earliest relatives of placentals and marsupials (Eutheria and Metatheria respectively), with the earliest crown group birds appearing towards the end of the Cretaceous. Teleost fish, the most diverse group of modern vertebrates, continued to diversify during the Cretaceous with the appearance of their most diverse subgroup Acanthomorpha during this period. During the Early Cretaceous, flowering plants appeared and began to rapidly diversify, becoming the dominant group of plants across the Earth by the end of the Cretaceous, coincident with the decline and extinction of previously widespread gymnosperm groups.

The Cretaceous (along with the Mesozoic) ended with the Cretaceous–Paleogene extinction event, a large mass extinction in which many groups, including non-avian dinosaurs, pterosaurs, and large marine reptiles, died out; it is widely thought to have been caused by the impact of a large asteroid that formed the Chicxulub crater in the Gulf of Mexico. The end of the Cretaceous is defined by the abrupt Cretaceous–Paleogene boundary (K–Pg boundary), a geologic signature associated with the mass extinction that lies between the Mesozoic and Cenozoic Eras.

== Etymology and history ==
The Cretaceous as a separate period was first defined by Belgian geologist Jean d'Omalius d'Halloy in 1822 as the Terrain Crétacé, using strata in the Paris Basin and named for the extensive beds of chalk (calcium carbonate deposited by the shells of marine invertebrates, principally coccoliths), found in the upper Cretaceous of Western Europe. The name 'Cretaceous' was derived from the Latin creta, meaning 'chalk'. The twofold division of the Cretaceous was implemented by Conybeare and Phillips in 1822. Alcide d'Orbigny in 1840 divided the French Cretaceous into five étages (stages): the Neocomian, Aptian, Albian, Turonian, and Senonian, later adding the Urgonian between Neocomian and Aptian and the Cenomanian between the Albian and Turonian.

== Geology ==
=== Subdivisions ===
The Cretaceous is divided into Early and Late Cretaceous epochs, or Lower and Upper Cretaceous series. In older literature, the Cretaceous is sometimes divided into three series: Neocomian (lower/early), Gallic (middle) and Senonian (upper/late). A subdivision into 12 stages, all originating from European stratigraphy, is now used worldwide. In many parts of the world, alternative local subdivisions are still in use.

From youngest to oldest, the subdivisions of the Cretaceous Period are:

Subdivisions of the Cretaceous
Epoch	Age/Stage	Start (base)	Definition	Etymology
Epoch	Age/Stage	(Ma)	Definition	Etymology
Paleocene	Danian	66		
Late Cretaceous	Maastrichtian	72.2 ± 0.2	top: iridium anomaly at the Cretaceous–Paleogene boundary base:first occurrence of Pachydiscus neubergicus	Maastricht Formation, Maastricht, Netherlands
Late Cretaceous	Campanian	83.6 ± 0.2	base: last occurrence of Marsupites testudinarius	Champagne, France
Late Cretaceous	Santonian	85.7 ± 0.2	base: first occurrence of Cladoceramus undulatoplicatus	Saintes, France
Late Cretaceous	Coniacian	89.8 ± 0.3	base: first occurrence of Cremnoceramus rotundatus	Cognac, France
Late Cretaceous	Turonian	93.9 ± 0.2	base: first occurrence of Watinoceras devonense	Tours, France
Late Cretaceous	Cenomanian	100.5 ± 0.1	base: first occurrence of Rotalipora globotruncanoides	Cenomanum; Le Mans, France
Early Cretaceous	Albian	113.2 ± 0.3	base: first occurrence of Praediscosphaera columnata	Aube, France
Early Cretaceous	Aptian	121.4 ± 0.6	base: magnetic anomaly M0r	Apt, France
Early Cretaceous	Barremian	125.77 ± 1.5	base: first occurrence of Spitidiscus hugii and S. vandeckii	Barrême, France
Early Cretaceous	Hauterivian	132.6 ± 0.6	base: first occurrence of Acanthodiscus	Hauterive, Switzerland
Early Cretaceous	Valanginian	137.05 ± 0.2	base: first occurrence of Calpionellites darderi	Valangin, Switzerland
Early Cretaceous	Berriasian	143.1 ±0.6	base: first occurrence of Berriasella jacobi (traditionally); first occurrence of Calpionella alpina (since 2016)	Berrias, France

=== Boundaries ===
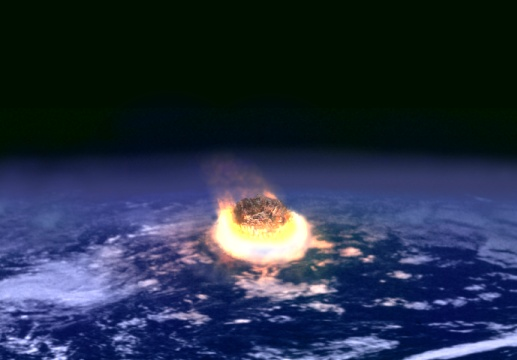
The impact of a meteorite or comet is today widely accepted as the main reason for the Cretaceous–Paleogene extinction event.

The lower boundary of the Cretaceous is currently undefined, and the Jurassic–Cretaceous boundary is currently the only system boundary to lack a defined Global Boundary Stratotype Section and Point (GSSP). Placing a GSSP for this boundary has been difficult because of the strong regionality of most biostratigraphic markers, and the lack of any chemostratigraphic events, such as isotope excursions (large sudden changes in ratios of isotopes) that could be used to define or correlate a boundary. Calpionellids, an enigmatic group of planktonic protists with urn-shaped calcitic tests briefly abundant during the latest Jurassic to earliest Cretaceous, have been suggested as the most promising candidates for fixing the Jurassic–Cretaceous boundary. In particular, the first appearance Calpionella alpina, coinciding with the base of the eponymous Alpina subzone, has been proposed as the definition of the base of the Cretaceous. The working definition for the boundary has often been placed as the first appearance of the ammonite Strambergella jacobi, formerly placed in the genus Berriasella, but its use as a stratigraphic indicator has been questioned, as its first appearance does not correlate with that of C. alpina. The boundary is officially considered by the International Commission on Stratigraphy to be approximately 145 Ma, but other estimates have been proposed based on U-Pb geochronology, ranging as young as 140 Ma.

The upper boundary of the Cretaceous is sharply defined, being placed at an iridium-rich layer found worldwide that is believed to be associated with the Chicxulub impact crater, with its boundaries circumscribing parts of the Yucatán Peninsula and extending into the Gulf of Mexico. This layer has been dated at 66.043 Ma.

At the end of the Cretaceous, the impact of a large body with the Earth may have arrived at the end of a progressive decline in biodiversity during the Maastrichtian age. The results of the impact were the extinction of three-quarters of Earth's plant and animal species, and the creation of a sharp break known as the K–Pg boundary (formerly known as the K–T boundary). Earth's biodiversity required substantial time to recover from this event, despite the probable existence of an abundance of vacant ecological niches.

Despite the severity of the K-Pg extinction event, there were significant variations in the rate of extinction between and within different clades. Species that depended on photosynthesis declined or became extinct as atmospheric particles blocked solar energy. As is the case today, photosynthesizing organisms, such as phytoplankton and land plants, formed the primary part of the food chain in the late Cretaceous, and all else that depended on them suffered, as well. Herbivorous animals, which depended on plants and plankton as their food, died out as their food sources became scarce; consequently, the top predators, such as Tyrannosaurus rex, also perished. Yet only three major groups of tetrapods disappeared completely; the non-avian dinosaurs, the plesiosaurs and the pterosaurs. The other Cretaceous groups that did not survive into the Cenozoic Era — the ichthyosaurs, last remaining temnospondyls (Koolasuchus), and nonmammalian cynodonts (Tritylodontidae) — were already extinct millions of years before the event occurred.

Coccolithophorids and molluscs, including ammonites, rudists, freshwater snails, and mussels, as well as organisms whose food chain included these shell builders, became extinct or suffered heavy losses. For example, ammonites are thought to have been the principal food of mosasaurs, a group of giant marine lizards related to snakes that became extinct at the boundary.

Omnivores, insectivores, and carrion-eaters survived the extinction event, perhaps because of the increased availability of their food sources. At the end of the Cretaceous, there seem to have been no purely herbivorous or carnivorous mammals. Mammals and birds that survived the extinction fed on insects, larvae, worms, and snails, which in turn fed on dead plant and animal matter. Scientists theorise that these organisms survived the collapse of plant-based food chains because they fed on detritus.

In stream communities, few groups of animals became extinct. Stream communities rely less on food from living plants and more on detritus that washes in from land. This particular ecological niche buffered them from extinction. Similar, but more complex patterns have been found in the oceans. Extinction was more severe among animals living in the water column than among animals living on or in the seafloor. Animals in the water column are almost entirely dependent on primary production from living phytoplankton, while animals living on or in the ocean floor feed on detritus or can switch to detritus feeding.

The largest air-breathing survivors of the event, crocodilians and champsosaurs, were semiaquatic and had access to detritus. Modern crocodilians can live as scavengers and can survive for months without food and go into hibernation when conditions are unfavorable, and their young are small, grow slowly, and feed largely on invertebrates and dead organisms or fragments of organisms for their first few years. These characteristics have been linked to crocodilian survival at the end of the Cretaceous.

=== Geologic formations ===
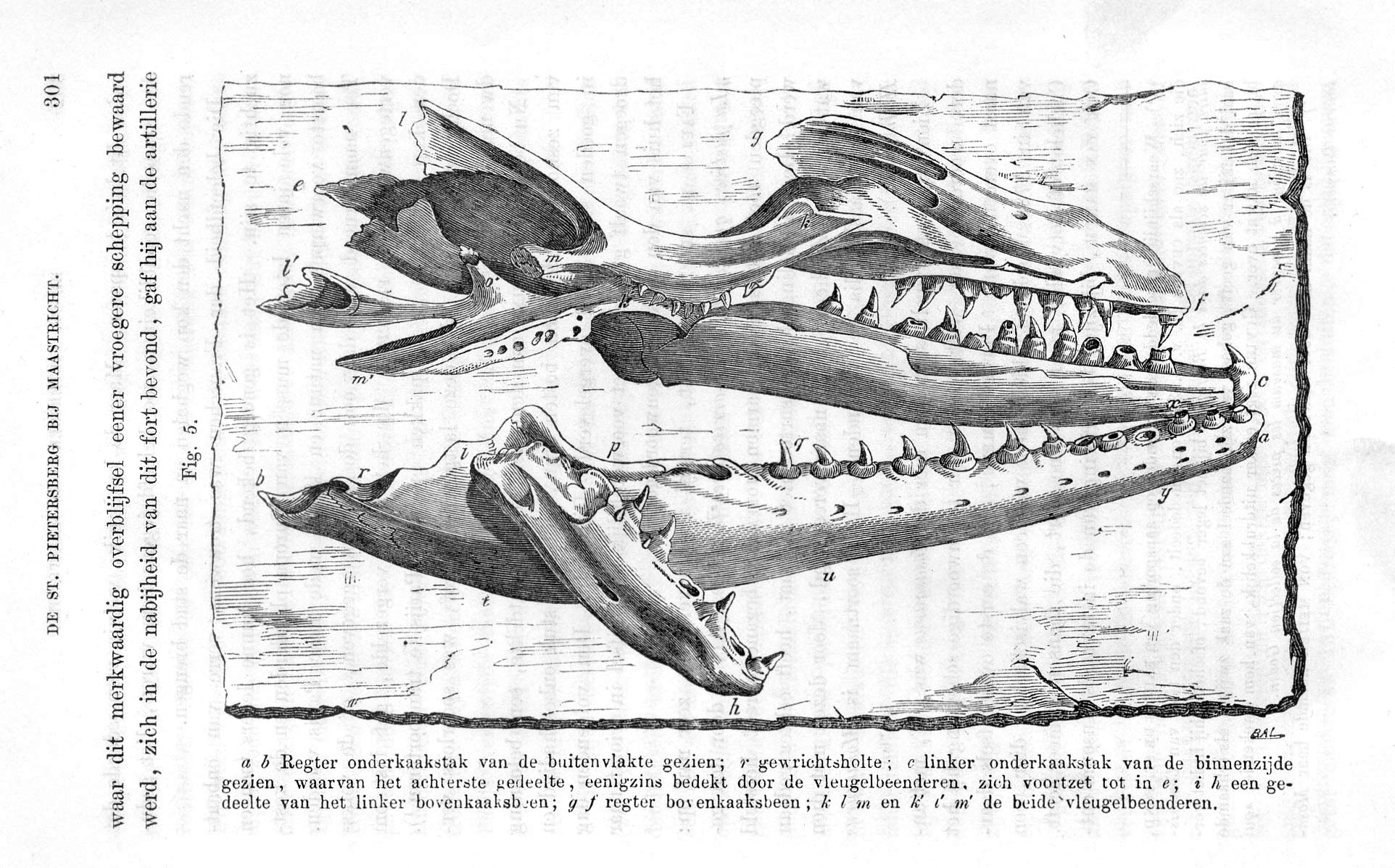
Drawing of fossil jaws of Mosasaurus hoffmanni, from the Maastrichtian of Dutch Limburg, by Dutch geologist Pieter Harting (1866)

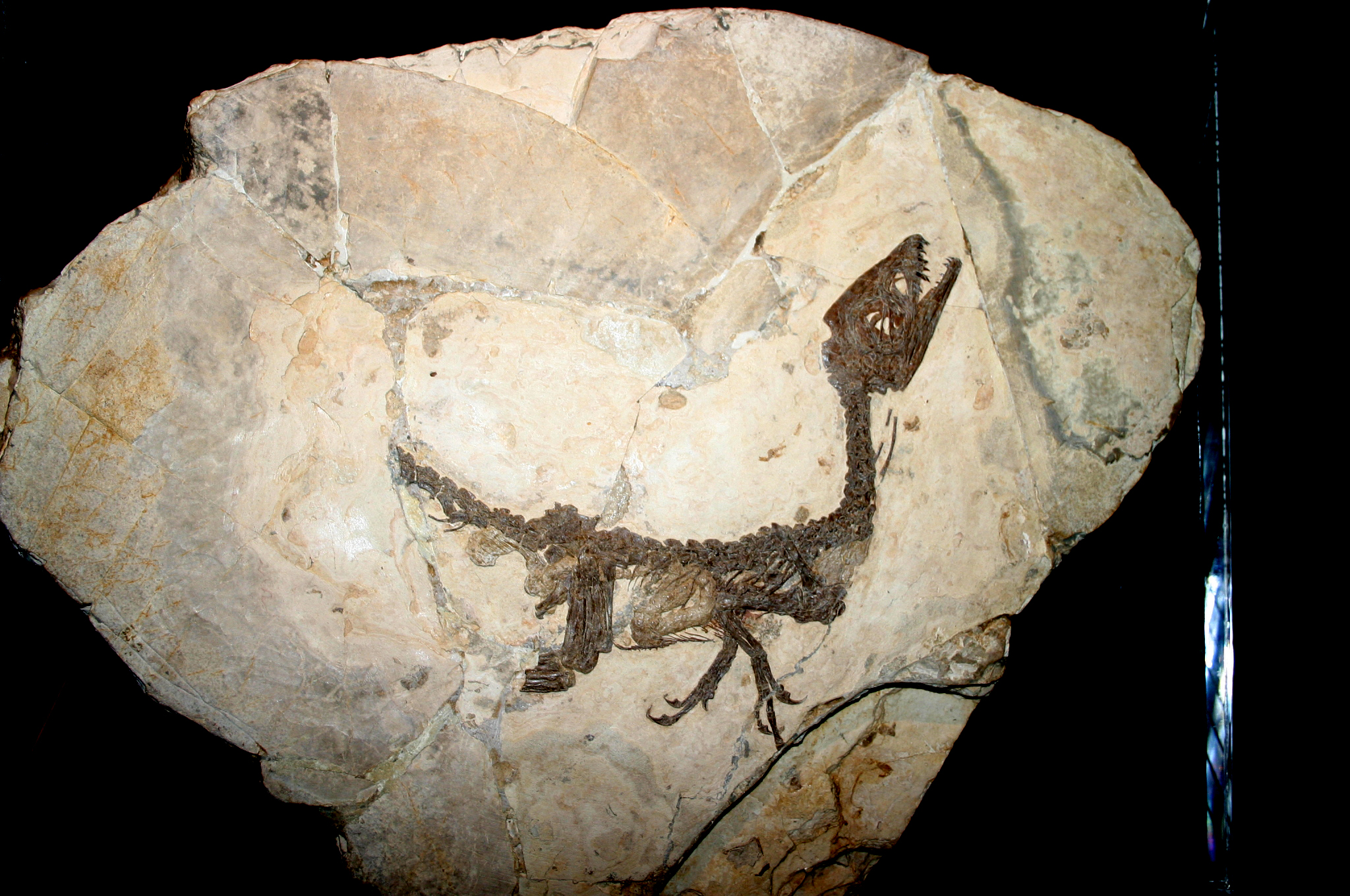
Scipionyx, a theropod dinosaur from the Early Cretaceous of Italy

The high sea level and warm climate of the Cretaceous meant large areas of the continents were covered by warm, shallow seas, providing habitat for many marine organisms. The Cretaceous was named for the extensive chalk deposits of this age in Europe, but in many parts of the world, the deposits from the Cretaceous are of marine limestone, a rock type that is formed under warm, shallow marine conditions. Due to the high sea level, there was extensive space for such sedimentation. Because of the relatively young age and great thickness of the system, Cretaceous rocks are evident in many areas worldwide.

Chalk is a rock type characteristic for (but not restricted to) the Cretaceous. It consists of coccoliths, microscopically small calcite skeletons of coccolithophores, a type of algae that prospered in the Cretaceous seas.

Stagnation of deep-sea currents in middle Cretaceous times caused anoxic conditions in the sea water leaving the deposited organic matter undecomposed. Half of the world's petroleum reserves were laid down at this time in the anoxic conditions of what would become the Persian Gulf and the Gulf of Mexico. In many places around the world, dark anoxic shales were formed during this interval, such as the Mancos Shale of western North America. These shales are an important source rock for oil and gas, for example in the subsurface of the North Sea.

==== Europe ====
In northwestern Europe, chalk deposits from the Upper Cretaceous are characteristic for the Chalk Group, which forms the white cliffs of Dover on the south coast of England and similar cliffs on the French Normandian coast. The group is found in England, northern France, the Low Countries, northern Germany, Denmark and in the subsurface of the southern part of the North Sea. Chalk is not easily consolidated and the Chalk Group still consists of loose sediments in many places. The group also has other limestones and arenites. Among the fossils it contains are sea urchins, belemnites, ammonites and sea reptiles such as Mosasaurus.

In southern Europe, the Cretaceous is usually a marine system consisting of competent limestone beds or incompetent marls. Because the Alpine mountain chains did not yet exist in the Cretaceous, these deposits formed on the southern edge of the European continental shelf, at the margin of the Tethys Ocean.

==== North America ====
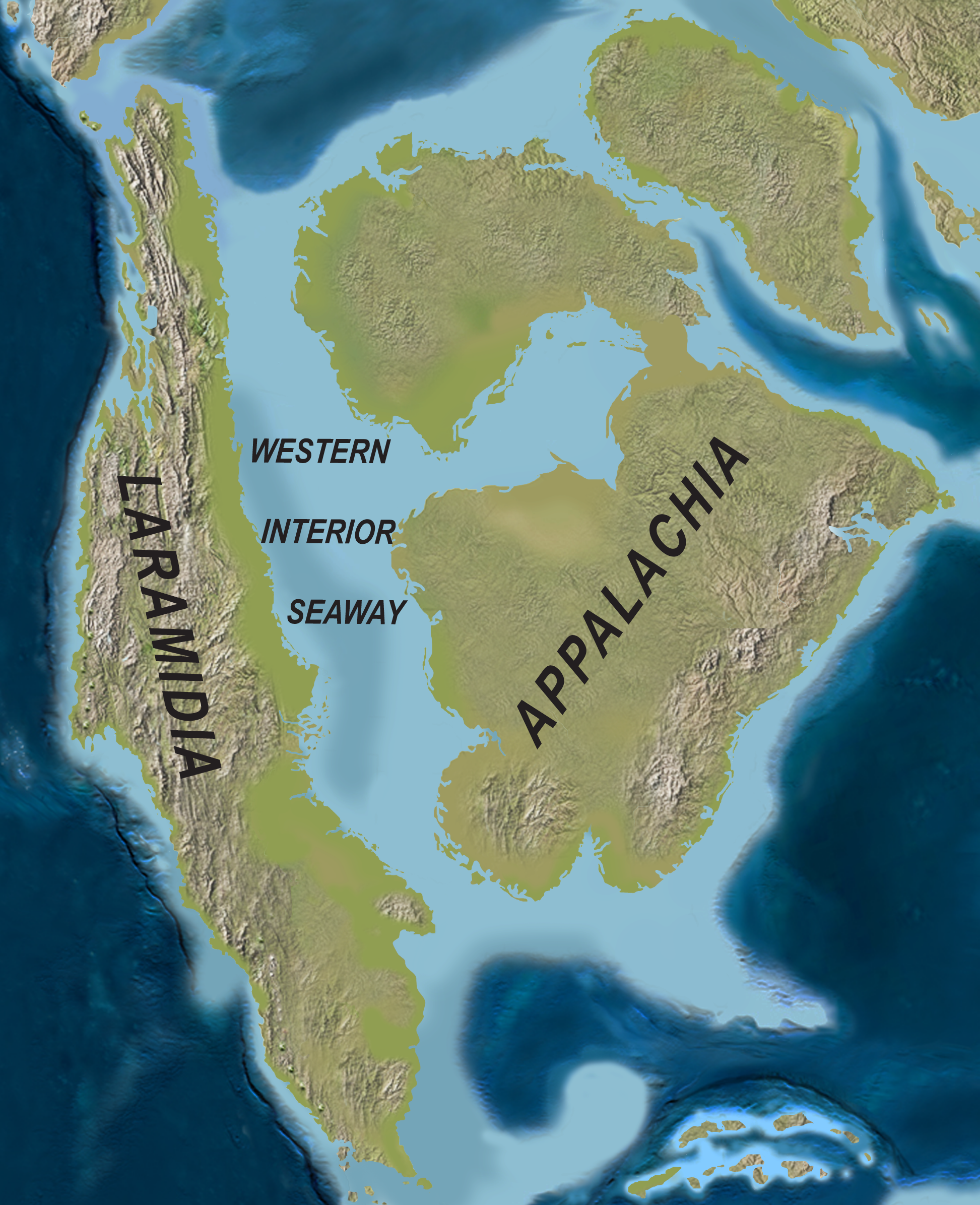
Map of North America During the Late Cretaceous

During the Cretaceous, the present North American continent was isolated from the other continents. In the Jurassic, the North Atlantic already opened, leaving a proto-ocean between Europe and North America. From north to south across the continent, the Western Interior Seaway started forming. This inland sea separated the elevated areas of Laramidia in the west and Appalachia in the east. Three dinosaur clades found in Laramidia (troodontids, therizinosaurids and oviraptorosaurs) are absent from Appalachia from the Coniacian through the Maastrichtian.

== Paleogeography ==
During the Cretaceous, the late-Paleozoic-to-early-Mesozoic supercontinent of Pangaea completed its tectonic breakup into the present-day continents, although their positions were substantially different at the time. As the Atlantic Ocean widened, the convergent-margin mountain building (orogenies) that had begun during the Jurassic continued in the North American Cordillera, as the Nevadan orogeny was followed by the Sevier and Laramide orogenies.

Gondwana had begun to break up during the Jurassic Period, but its fragmentation accelerated during the Cretaceous and was largely complete by the end of the period. South America, Antarctica, and Australia rifted away from Africa (though India and Madagascar remained attached to each other until around 80 million years ago); thus, the South Atlantic and Indian Oceans were newly formed. Such active rifting lifted great undersea mountain chains along the welts, raising eustatic sea levels worldwide. To the north of Africa the Tethys Sea continued to narrow. During most of the Late Cretaceous, North America would be divided in two by the Western Interior Seaway, a large interior sea, separating Laramidia to the west and Appalachia to the east, then receded late in the period, leaving thick marine deposits sandwiched between coal beds. Bivalve palaeobiogeography also indicates that Africa was split in half by a shallow sea during the Coniacian and Santonian, connecting the Tethys with the South Atlantic by way of the central Sahara and Central Africa, which were then underwater. Yet another shallow seaway ran between what is now Norway and Greenland, connecting the Tethys to the Arctic Ocean and enabling biotic exchange between the two oceans. At the peak of the Cretaceous transgression, one-third of Earth's present land area was submerged.

The Cretaceous is justly famous for its chalk; indeed, more chalk formed in the Cretaceous than in any other period in the Phanerozoic. Mid-ocean ridge activity—or rather, the circulation of seawater through the enlarged ridges—enriched the oceans in calcium; this made the oceans more saturated, as well as increased the bioavailability of the element for calcareous nanoplankton. These widespread carbonates and other sedimentary deposits make the Cretaceous rock record especially fine. Famous formations from North America include the rich marine fossils of Kansas's Smoky Hill Chalk Member and the terrestrial fauna of the late Cretaceous Hell Creek Formation. Other important Cretaceous exposures occur in Europe (e.g., the Weald) and China (the Yixian Formation). In the area that is now India, massive lava beds called the Deccan Traps erupted in the very late Cretaceous and early Paleocene.

== Climate ==
Palynological evidence indicates the Cretaceous climate had three broad phases:

- a Berriasian–Barremian warm-dry phase,
- an Aptian–Santonian warm-wet phase,
- a Campanian–Maastrichtian cool-dry phase.

As in the Cenozoic, the 400,000 year eccentricity cycle was the dominant orbital cycle governing carbon flux between different reservoirs and influencing global climate. The location of the Intertropical Convergence Zone (ITCZ) was roughly the same as in the present.

The cooling trend of the last epoch of the Jurassic, the Tithonian, continued into the Berriasian, the first age of the Cretaceous. The North Atlantic seaway opened and enabled the flow of cool water from the Boreal Ocean into the Tethys. There is evidence that snowfalls were common in the higher latitudes during this age, and the tropics became wetter than during the Triassic and Jurassic. Glaciation was restricted to high-latitude mountains, though seasonal snow may have existed farther from the poles.

- After the end of the first age, however, temperatures began to increase again, with a number of thermal excursions, such as the middle Valanginian Weissert Thermal Excursion, which was caused by the Paraná-Etendeka Large Igneous Province's activity.
- It was followed by the middle Hauterivian Faraoni Thermal Excursion and the early Barremian Hauptblatterton Thermal Event (HTE). The HTE marked the ultimate end of the Tithonian-early Barremian Cool Interval (TEBCI). During this interval, precession was the dominant orbital driver of environmental changes in the Vocontian Basin. For much of the TEBCI, northern Gondwana experienced a monsoonal climate. A shallow thermocline existed in the mid-latitude Tethys.
- The TEBCI was followed by the Barremian-Aptian Warm Interval (BAWI). This hot climatic interval coincides with Manihiki and Ontong Java Plateau volcanism and with the Selli Event. Early Aptian tropical sea surface temperatures (SSTs) were 27–32 °C, based on TEX_{86} measurements from the equatorial Pacific. During the Aptian, Milankovitch cycles governed the occurrence of anoxic events by modulating the intensity of the hydrological cycle and terrestrial runoff. The early Aptian was also notable for its millennial scale hyperarid events in the mid-latitudes of Asia.
- The BAWI itself was followed by the Aptian-Albian Cold Snap (AACS) that began about 118 Ma. A short, relatively minor ice age may have occurred during this so-called "cold snap", as evidenced by glacial dropstones in the western parts of the Tethys Ocean and the expansion of calcareous nannofossils that dwelt in cold water into lower latitudes. The AACS is associated with an arid period in the Iberian Peninsula.

Temperatures increased drastically after the end of the AACS, which ended around 111 Ma with the Paquier/Urbino Thermal Maximum, giving way to the Mid-Cretaceous Hothouse (MKH), which lasted from the early Albian until the early Campanian. Faster rates of seafloor spreading and entry of carbon dioxide into the atmosphere are believed to have initiated this period of extreme warmth, along with high flood basalt activity. The MKH was punctuated by multiple thermal maxima of extreme warmth.

- The Leenhardt Thermal Event occurred around 110 Ma, followed shortly by the l'Arboudeyesse Thermal Event a million years later.
- Following these two hyperthermals was the Amadeus Thermal Maximum around 106 Ma, during the middle Albian.
- Then, around a million years after that, occurred the Petite Verol Thermal Event.
- Afterwards, around 102.5 Ma, the Event 6 Thermal Event took place;
- this event was itself followed by the Breistroffer Thermal Maximum around 101 Ma, during the latest Albian.
- Approximately 94 Ma, the Cenomanian-Turonian Thermal Maximum occurred, with this hyperthermal being the most extreme hothouse interval of the Cretaceous and being associated with a sea level highstand.
- Temperatures cooled down slightly over the next few million years, but then another thermal maximum, the Coniacian Thermal Maximum, happened, with this thermal event being dated to around 87 Ma. Atmospheric CO_{2} levels may have varied by thousands of ppm throughout the MKH. Mean annual temperatures at the poles during the MKH exceeded 14 °C. Such hot temperatures during the MKH resulted in a very gentle temperature gradient from the equator to the poles; the latitudinal temperature gradient during the Cenomanian-Turonian Thermal Maximum was 0.54 °C per ° latitude for the Southern Hemisphere and 0.49 °C per ° latitude for the Northern Hemisphere, in contrast to present day values of 1.07 and 0.69 °C per ° latitude for the Southern and Northern hemispheres, respectively. This meant weaker global winds, which drive the ocean currents, and resulted in less upwelling and more stagnant oceans than today. This is evidenced by widespread black shale deposition and frequent anoxic events. Tropical SSTs during the late Albian most likely averaged around 30 °C. Despite this high SST, seawater was not hypersaline at this time, as this would have required significantly higher temperatures still. On land, arid zones in the Albian regularly expanded northward in tandem with expansions of subtropical high pressure belts. The Cedar Mountain Formation's Soap Wash flora indicates a mean annual temperature of between 19 and 26 °C in Utah at the Albian-Cenomanian boundary. Tropical SSTs during the Cenomanian-Turonian Thermal Maximum were at least 30 °C, though one study estimated them as high as between 33 and 42 °C. An intermediate estimate of ~33-34 °C has also been given. Meanwhile, deep ocean temperatures were as much as 15 to 20 °C (27 to 36 °F) warmer than today's; one study estimated that deep ocean temperatures were between 12 and 20 °C during the MKH. The poles were so warm that ectothermic reptiles were able to inhabit them.

Beginning in the Santonian, near the end of the MKH, the global climate began to cool, with this cooling trend continuing across the Campanian. This period of cooling, driven by falling levels of atmospheric carbon dioxide, caused the end of the MKH and the transition into a cooler climatic interval, known formally as the Late Cretaceous-Early Palaeogene Cool Interval (LKEPCI). Tropical SSTs declined from around 35 °C in the early Campanian to around 28 °C in the Maastrichtian. Deep ocean temperatures declined to 9 to 12 °C, though the shallow temperature gradient between tropical and polar seas remained. Regional conditions in the Western Interior Seaway changed little between the MKH and the LKEPCI. During this period of relatively cool temperatures, the ITCZ became narrower, while the strength of both summer and winter monsoons in East Asia was directly correlated to atmospheric CO_{2} concentrations. Laramidia likewise had a seasonal, monsoonal climate. The Maastrichtian was a time of chaotic, highly variable climate. Two upticks in global temperatures are known to have occurred during the Maastrichtian, bucking the trend of overall cooler temperatures during the LKEPCI.

- Between 70 and 69 Ma and 66–65 Ma, isotopic ratios indicate elevated atmospheric CO_{2} pressures with levels of 1000–1400 ppmV and mean annual temperatures in west Texas between 21 and 23 °C (70 and 73 °F). Atmospheric CO_{2} and temperature relations indicate a doubling of pCO_{2} was accompanied by a ~0.6 °C increase in temperature.
- The latter warming interval, occurring at the very end of the Cretaceous, was triggered by the activity of the Deccan Traps. The LKEPCI lasted into the Late Palaeocene, when it gave way to another supergreenhouse interval.

A computer-simulated model of surface conditions in Middle Cretaceous, 100 mya, displaying the approximate shoreline and calculated isotherms

The production of large quantities of magma, variously attributed to mantle plumes or to extensional tectonics, further pushed sea levels up, so that large areas of the continental crust were covered with shallow seas. The Tethys Sea connecting the tropical oceans east to west also helped to warm the global climate. Warm-adapted plant fossils are known from localities as far north as Alaska and Greenland, while dinosaur fossils have been found within 15 degrees of the Cretaceous south pole. It was suggested that there was Antarctic marine glaciation in the Turonian Age, based on isotopic evidence. However, this has subsequently been suggested to be the result of inconsistent isotopic proxies, with evidence of polar rainforests during this time interval at 82° S. Rafting by ice of stones into marine environments occurred during much of the Cretaceous, but evidence of deposition directly from glaciers is limited to the Early Cretaceous of the Eromanga Basin in southern Australia.

High temperatures fueling massive storms, hurricanes, and wildfires caused damages to trees. This along with arthropod damage caused trees during this time to produce large amounts of resin leading to the Cretaceous Resinous Interval lasting from 125 to 75 million years ago.

== Flora ==
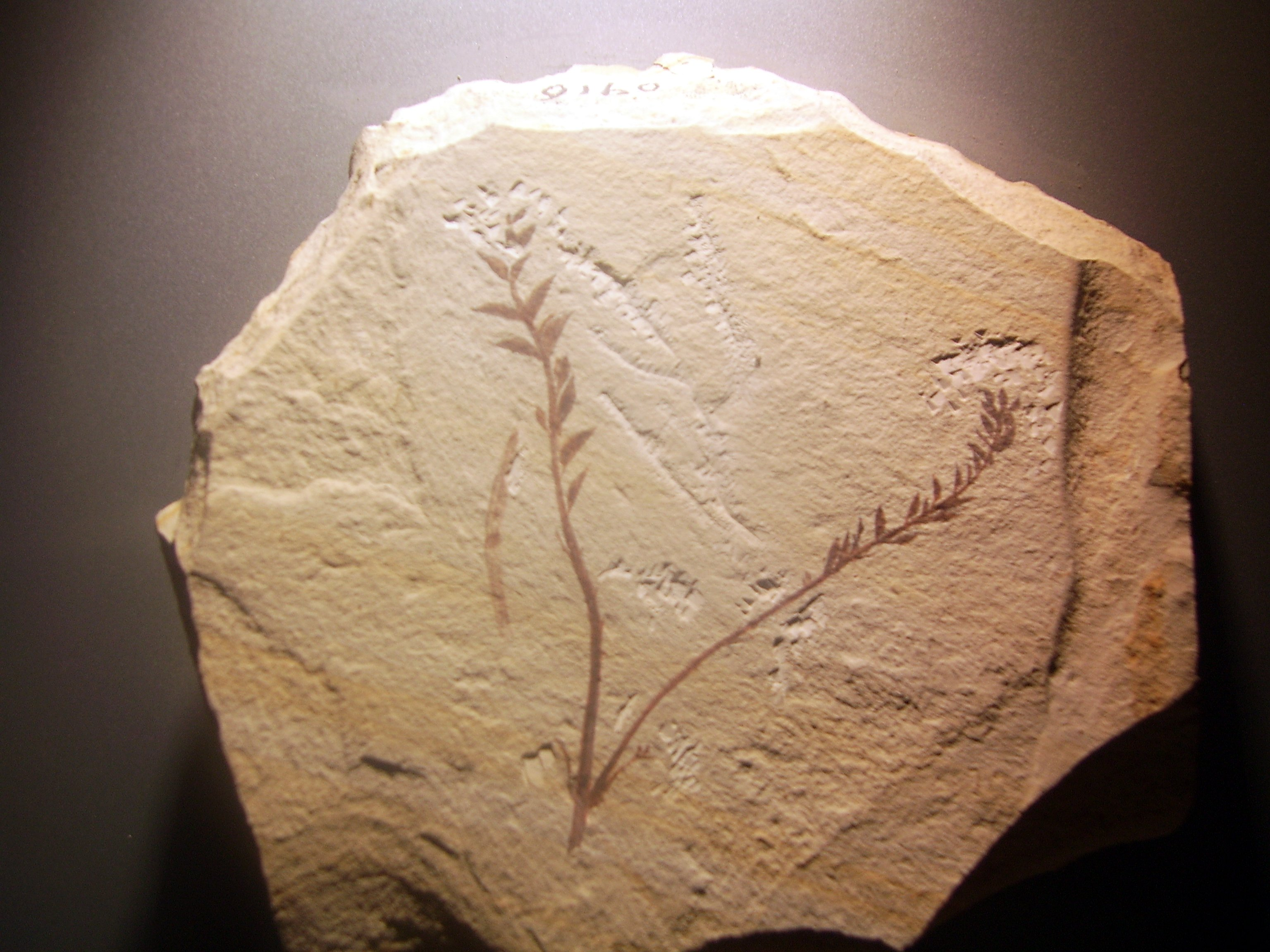
Facsimile of a fossil of Archaefructus from the Yixian Formation, China

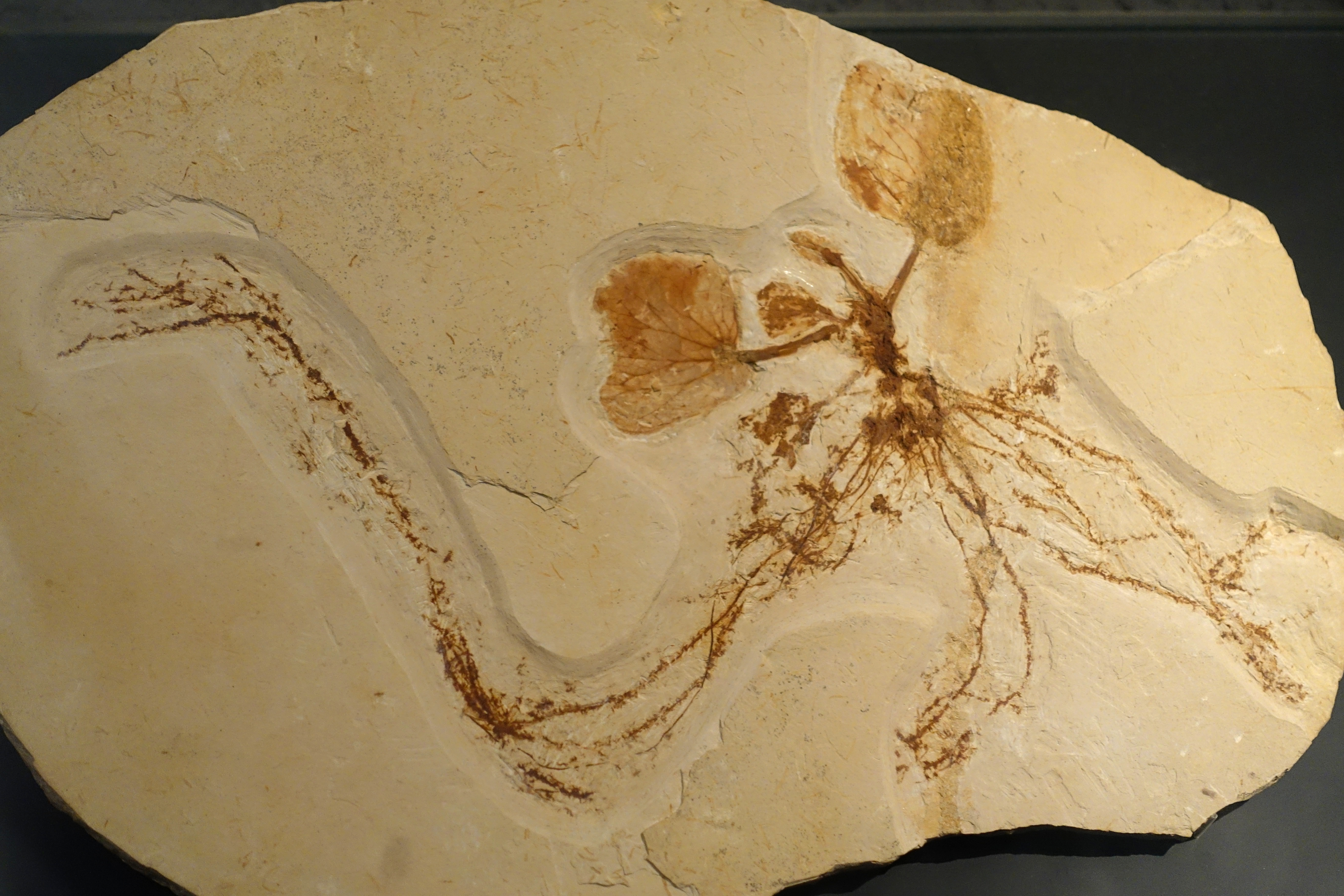
Fossil Jaguariba wiersemana specimen in the collection of the Natural History Museum, Berlin, Germany

Flowering plants (angiosperms) make up around 90% of living plant species today. Prior to the rise of angiosperms, during the Jurassic and the Early Cretaceous, the higher flora was dominated by gymnosperm groups, including cycads, conifers, ginkgophytes, gnetophytes and close relatives, as well as the extinct Bennettitales. Other groups of plants included pteridosperms or "seed ferns", a collective term that refers to disparate groups of extinct seed plants with fern-like foliage, including groups such as Corystospermaceae and Caytoniales. The exact origins of angiosperms are uncertain, although molecular evidence suggests that they are not closely related to any living group of gymnosperms.

The earliest widely accepted evidence of flowering plants are monosulcate (single-grooved) pollen grains from the late Valanginian (~ 134 Ma) found in Israel and Italy, initially at low abundance. Molecular clock estimates conflict with fossil estimates, suggesting the diversification of crown-group angiosperms during the Late Triassic or the Jurassic, but such estimates are difficult to reconcile with the heavily sampled pollen record and the distinctive tricolpate to tricolporoidate (triple grooved) pollen of eudicot angiosperms. Among the oldest records of Angiosperm macrofossils are Montsechia from the Barremian aged Las Hoyas beds of Spain and Archaefructus from the Barremian-Aptian boundary Yixian Formation in China. Tricolpate pollen distinctive of eudicots first appears in the Late Barremian, while the earliest remains of monocots are known from the Aptian. Flowering plants underwent a rapid radiation beginning during the middle Cretaceous, becoming the dominant group of land plants by the end of the period, coincident with the decline of previously dominant groups such as conifers. The oldest known fossils of grasses are from the Albian, with the family having diversified into modern groups by the end of the Cretaceous. The oldest large angiosperm trees are known from the Turonian (c. 90 Ma) of New Jersey, with the trunk having a preserved diameter of 1.8 metres (5.9 ft) and an estimated height of 50 metres (160 ft).

During the Cretaceous, ferns in the order Polypodiales, which make up 80% of living fern species, would also begin to diversify.

== Terrestrial fauna ==
On land, mammals were generally small sized, but a very relevant component of the fauna, with cimolodont multituberculates outnumbering dinosaurs in some sites. Neither true marsupials nor placentals existed until the very end, but a variety of non-marsupial metatherians and non-placental eutherians had already begun to diversify greatly, ranging as carnivores (Deltatheroida), aquatic foragers (Stagodontidae) and herbivores (Schowalteria, Zhelestidae). Various "archaic" groups like eutriconodonts were common in the Early Cretaceous, but by the Late Cretaceous northern mammalian faunas were dominated by multituberculates and therians, with dryolestoids dominating South America.

The apex predators were archosaurian reptiles, especially dinosaurs, which were at their most diverse stage. Avians such as the ancestors of modern-day birds also diversified. They inhabited every continent, and were even found in cold polar latitudes. Pterosaurs were common in the early and middle Cretaceous, but as the Cretaceous proceeded they declined for poorly understood reasons (once thought to be due to competition with early birds, but now it is understood avian adaptive radiation is not consistent with pterosaur decline). By the end of the period only three highly specialized families remained; Pteranodontidae, Nyctosauridae, and Azhdarchidae.

The Liaoning lagerstätte (Yixian Formation) in China is an important site, full of preserved remains of numerous types of small dinosaurs, birds and mammals, that provides a glimpse of life in the Early Cretaceous. The coelurosaur dinosaurs found there represent types of the group Maniraptora, which includes modern birds and their closest non-avian relatives, such as dromaeosaurs, oviraptorosaurs, therizinosaurs, troodontids along with other avialans. Fossils of these dinosaurs from the Liaoning lagerstätte are notable for the presence of hair-like feathers.

Insects diversified during the Cretaceous, and the oldest known ants, termites and some lepidopterans, akin to butterflies and moths, appeared. Aphids, grasshoppers and gall wasps appeared.

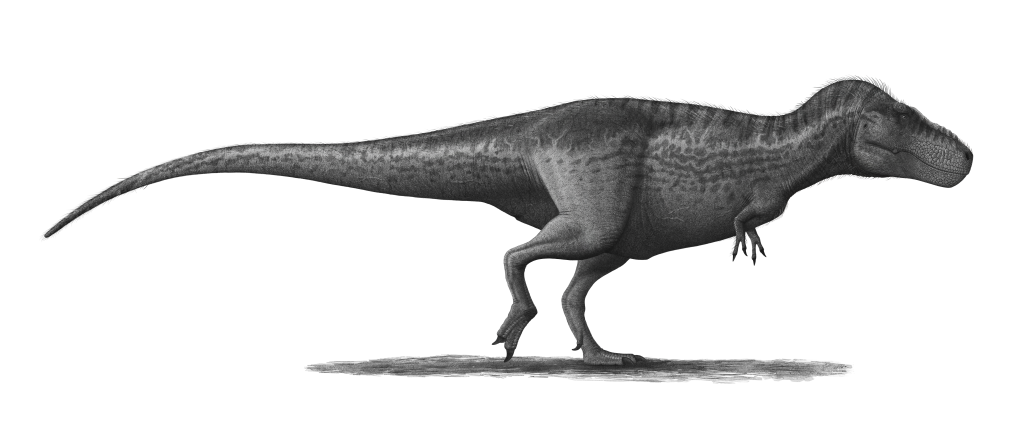
Tyrannosaurus rex, one of the largest land predators of all time, lived during the Late Cretaceous

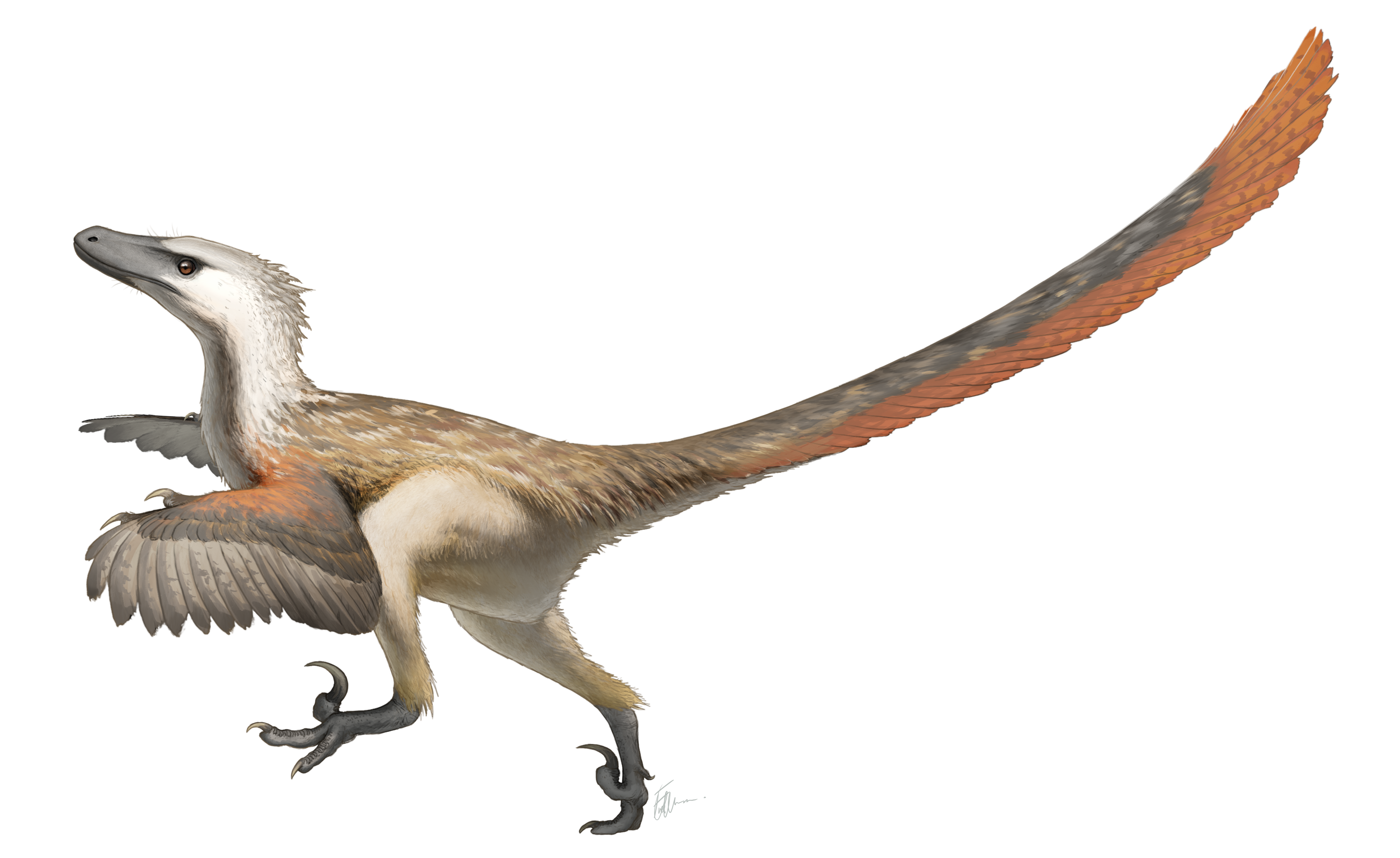
Up to 2 m long and 0.5 m high at the hip, Velociraptor was feathered and roamed the Late Cretaceous

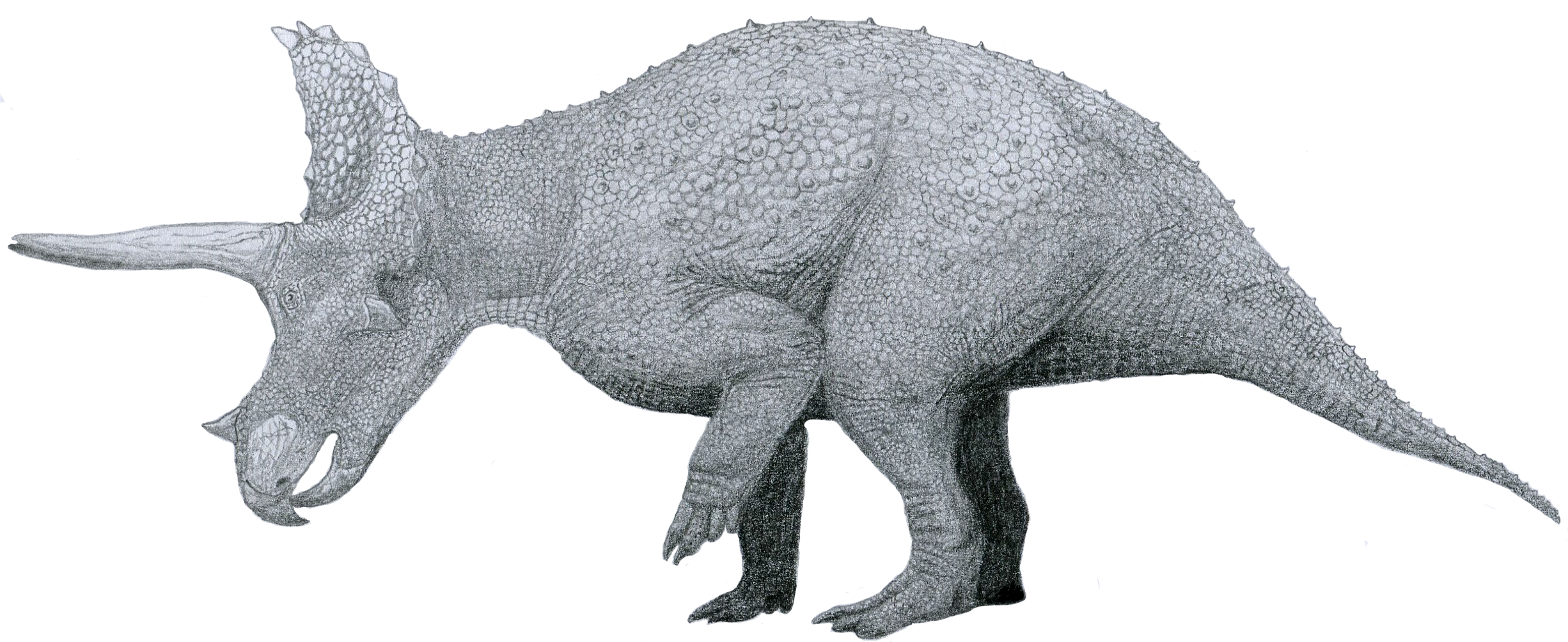
Triceratops, one of the most recognizable genera of the Cretaceous

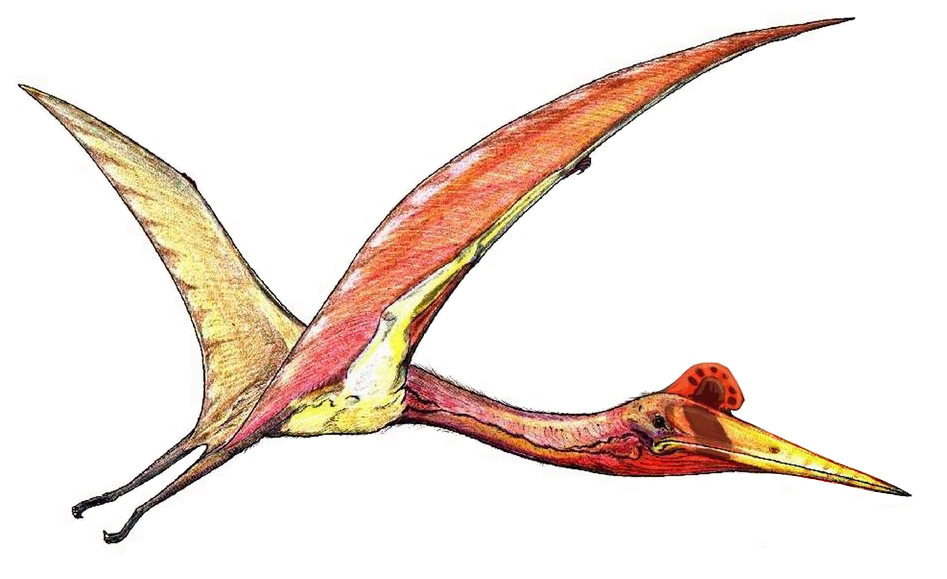
The azhdarchid Quetzalcoatlus, one of the largest animals to ever fly, lived during the Late Cretaceous

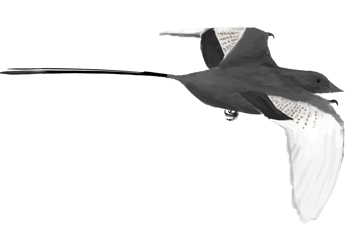
Confuciusornis, a genus of crow-sized birds from the Early Cretaceous

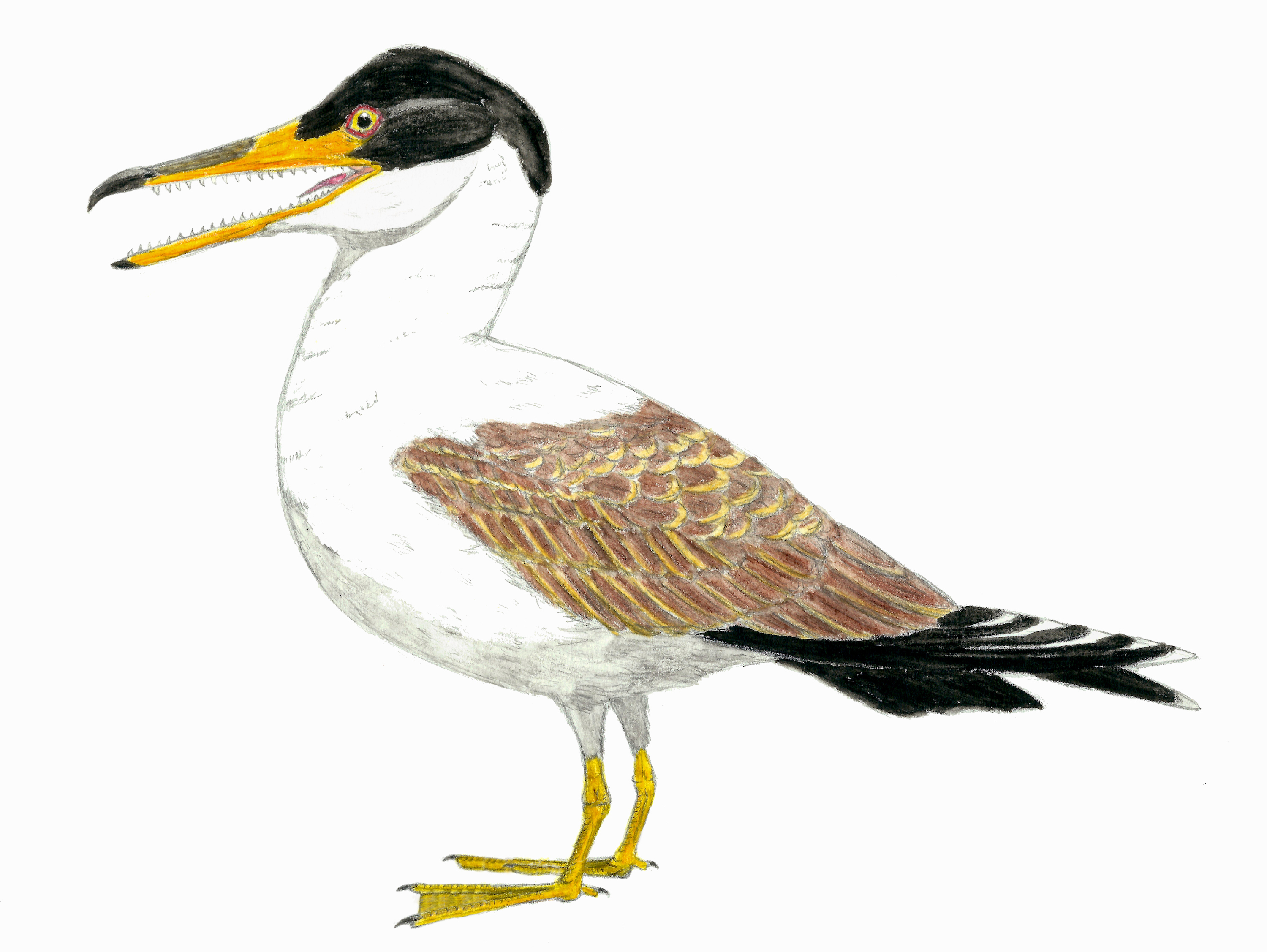
Ichthyornis was a toothed, seabird-like ornithuran from the Late Cretaceous

=== Rhynchocephalians ===
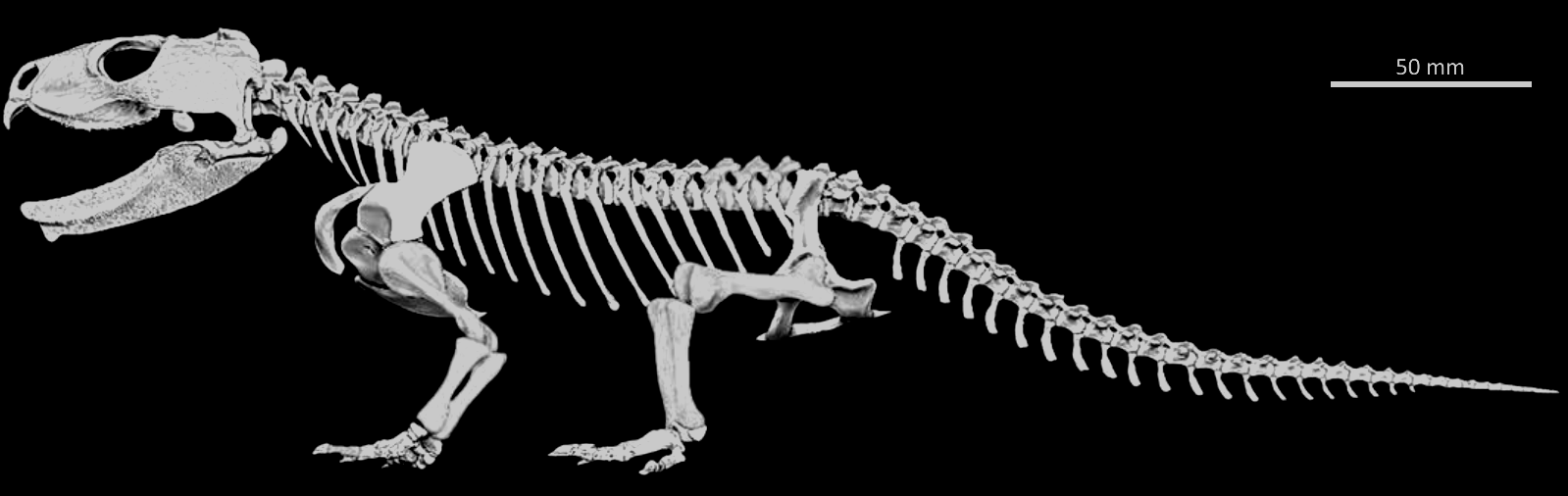
Skeleton of Priosphenodon avelasi a large herbivorous rhynchocephalian known from the mid-Cretaceous of South America

Rhynchocephalians (which today only includes the tuatara) disappeared from North America and Europe after the Early Cretaceous, and were absent from North Africa and northern South America by the early Late Cretaceous. The cause of the decline of Rhynchocephalia remains unclear, but has often been suggested to be due to competition with advanced lizards and mammals. They appear to have remained diverse in high-latitude southern South America during the Late Cretaceous, where lizards remained rare, with their remains outnumbering terrestrial lizards 200:1.

=== Choristodera ===
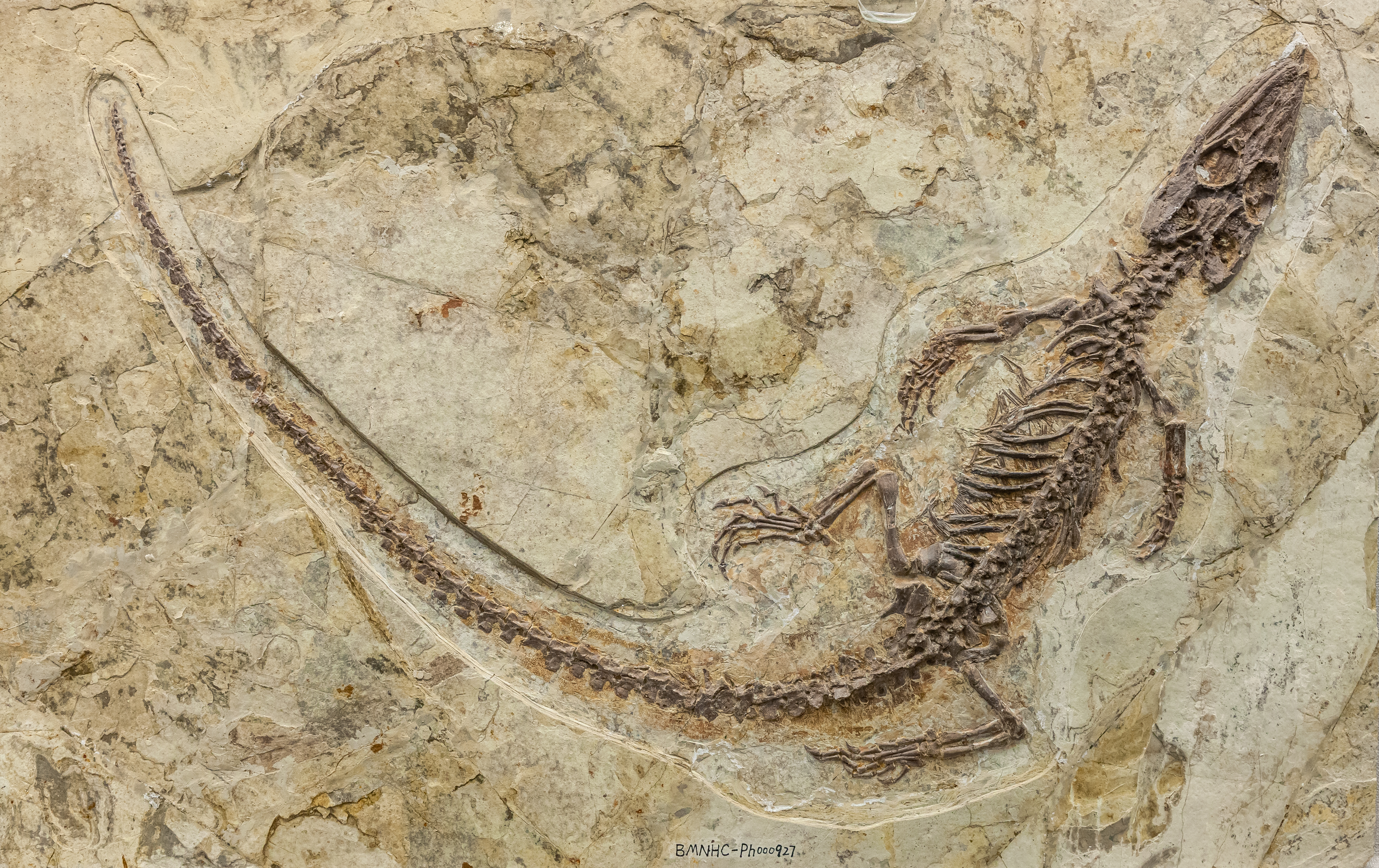
Philydrosaurus, a choristodere from the Early Cretaceous of China

Choristoderes, a group of freshwater aquatic reptiles that first appeared during the preceding Jurassic, underwent a major evolutionary radiation in Asia during the Early Cretaceous, which represents the high point of choristoderan diversity, including long necked forms such as Hyphalosaurus and the first records of the gharial-like Neochoristodera, which appear to have evolved in the regional absence of aquatic neosuchian crocodyliformes. During the Late Cretaceous the neochoristodere Champsosaurus was widely distributed across western North America. Due to the extreme climatic warmth in the Arctic, choristoderans were able to colonise it too during the Late Cretaceous.

== Marine fauna ==
In the seas, rays, modern sharks and teleosts became common. Marine reptiles included ichthyosaurs in the early and mid-Cretaceous (becoming extinct during the late Cretaceous Cenomanian-Turonian anoxic event), plesiosaurs throughout the entire period, and mosasaurs appearing in the Late Cretaceous. Sea turtles in the form of Cheloniidae and Panchelonioidea lived during the period and survived the extinction event. Besides Cheloniidae, Panchelonioidea is today represented by a single species; the leatherback sea turtle. The Hesperornithiformes were flightless, marine diving birds that swam like grebes.

Baculites, an ammonite genus with a straight shell, flourished in the seas along with reef-building rudist clams. Inoceramids were also particularly notable among Cretaceous bivalves, and they have been used to identify major biotic turnovers such as at the Turonian-Coniacian boundary. Predatory gastropods with drilling habits were widespread. Globotruncanid foraminifera and echinoderms such as sea urchins and starfish (sea stars) thrived. Ostracods were abundant in Cretaceous marine settings; ostracod species characterised by high male sexual investment had the highest rates of extinction and turnover. Thylacocephala, a class of crustaceans, went extinct in the Late Cretaceous. The first radiation of the diatoms (generally siliceous shelled, rather than calcareous) in the oceans occurred during the Cretaceous; freshwater diatoms did not appear until the Miocene. Calcareous nannoplankton were important components of the marine microbiota and important as biostratigraphic markers and recorders of environmental change.

The Cretaceous was also an important interval in the evolution of bioerosion, the production of borings and scrapings in rocks, hardgrounds and shells.

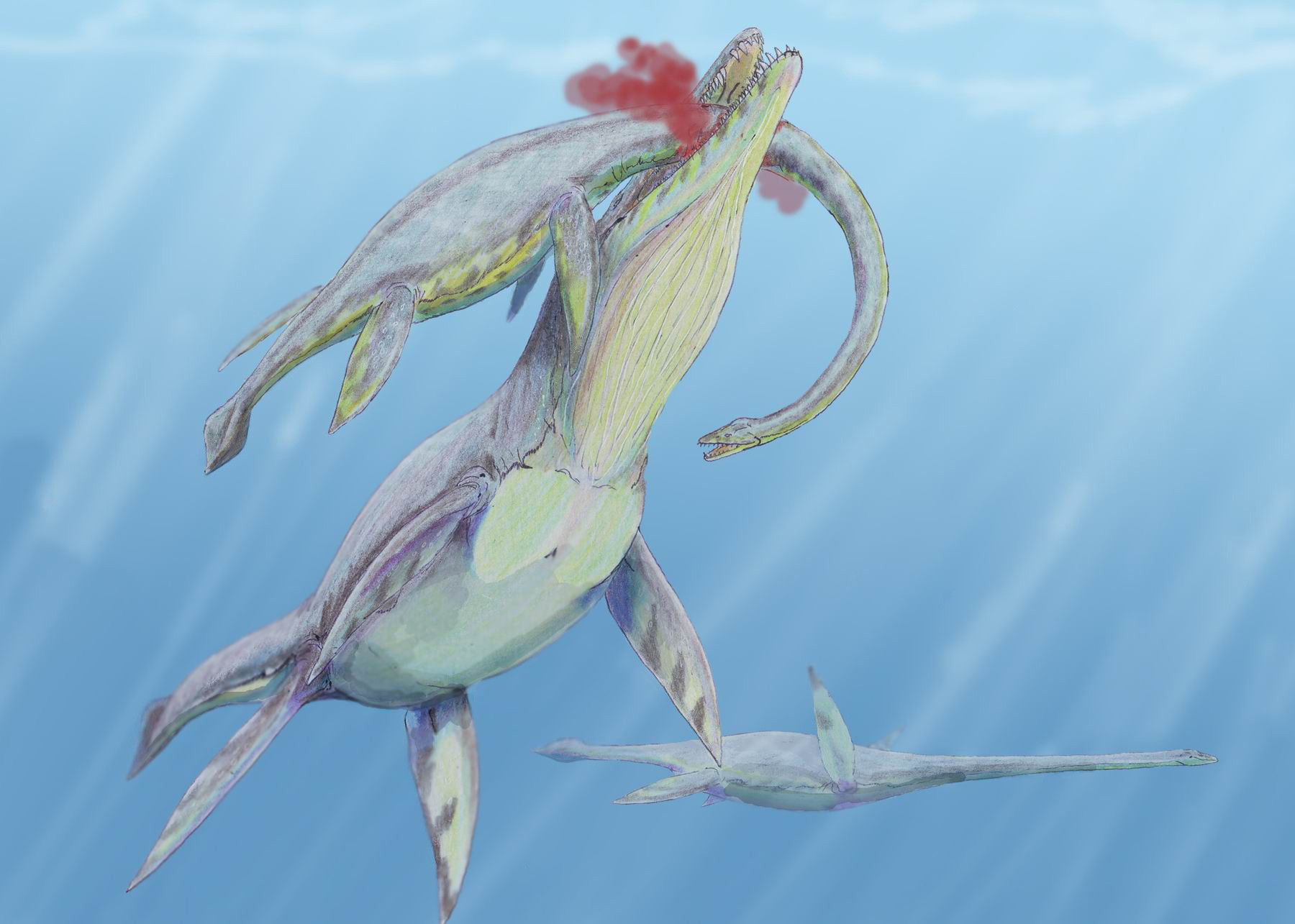
A scene from the early Cretaceous: a Woolungasaurus is attacked by a Kronosaurus.

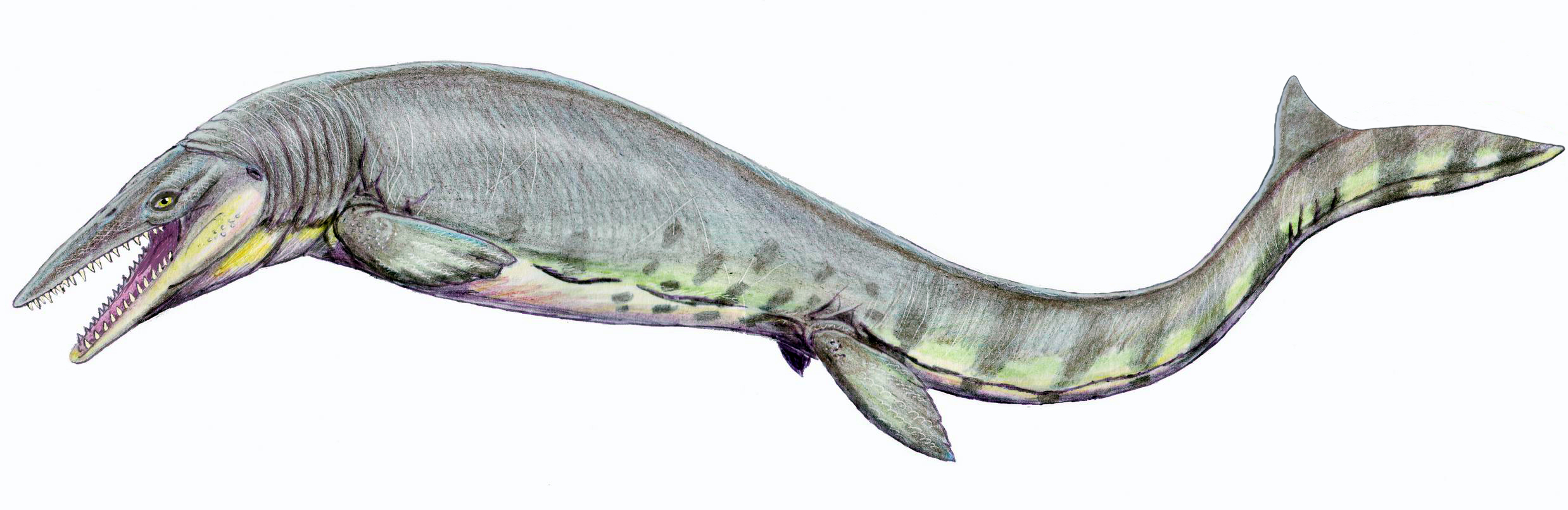
Tylosaurus was a large mosasaur, carnivorous marine reptiles that emerged in the late Cretaceous.

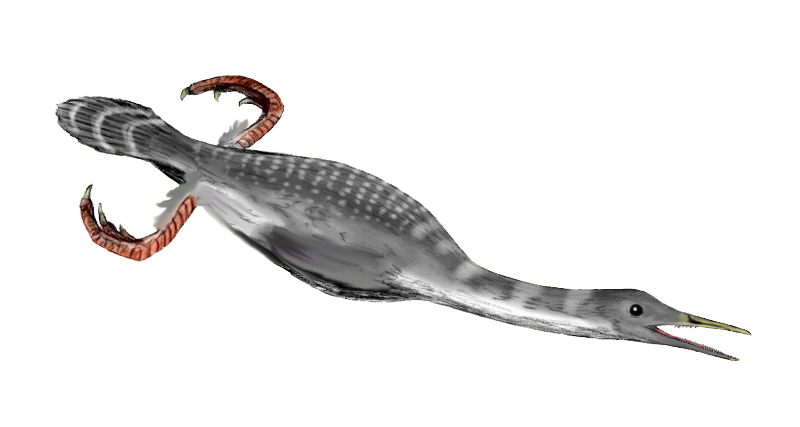
Strong-swimming and toothed predatory waterbird Hesperornis roamed late Cretacean oceans.

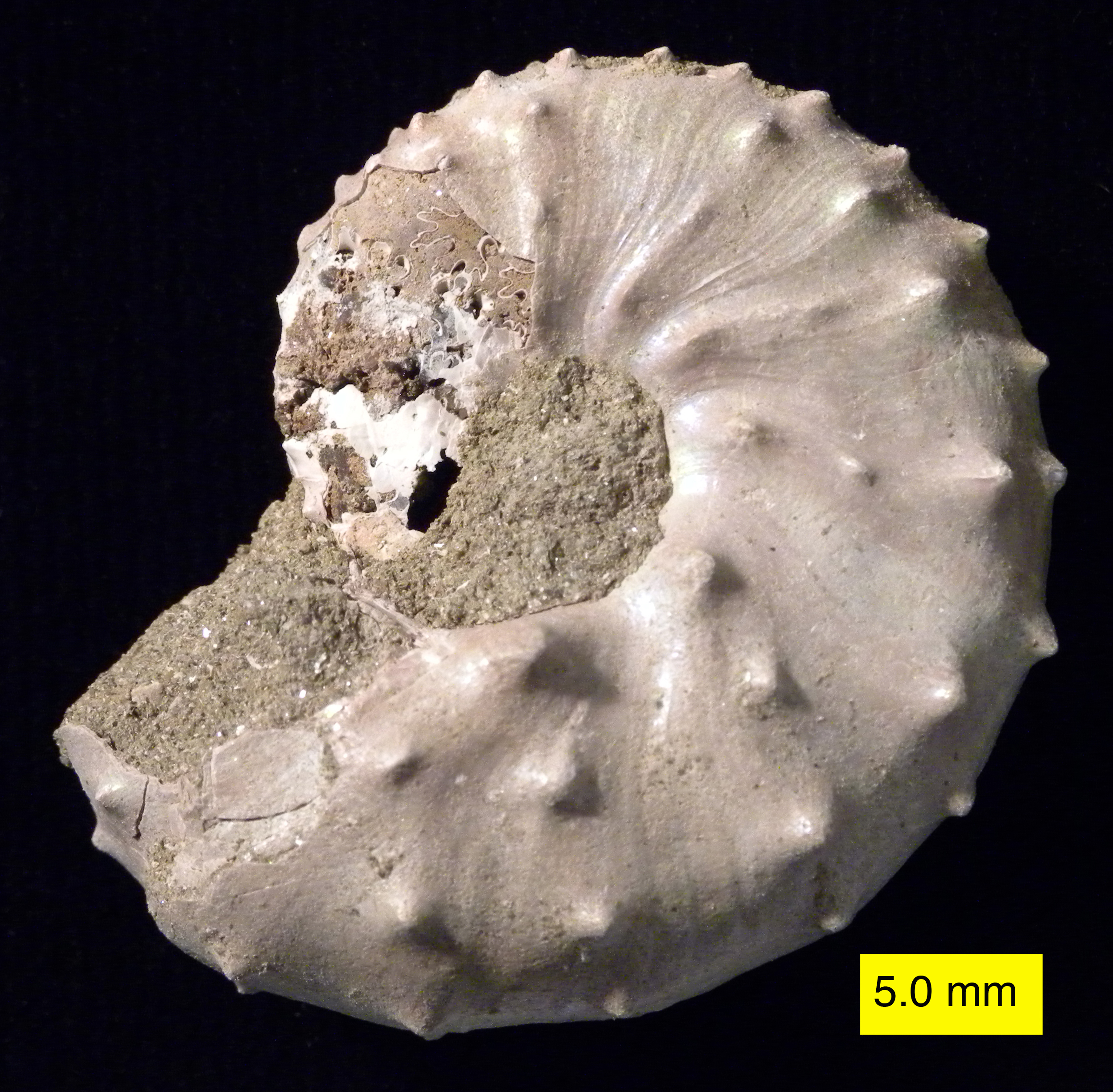
The ammonite Discoscaphites iris, Owl Creek Formation (Upper Cretaceous), Ripley, Mississippi

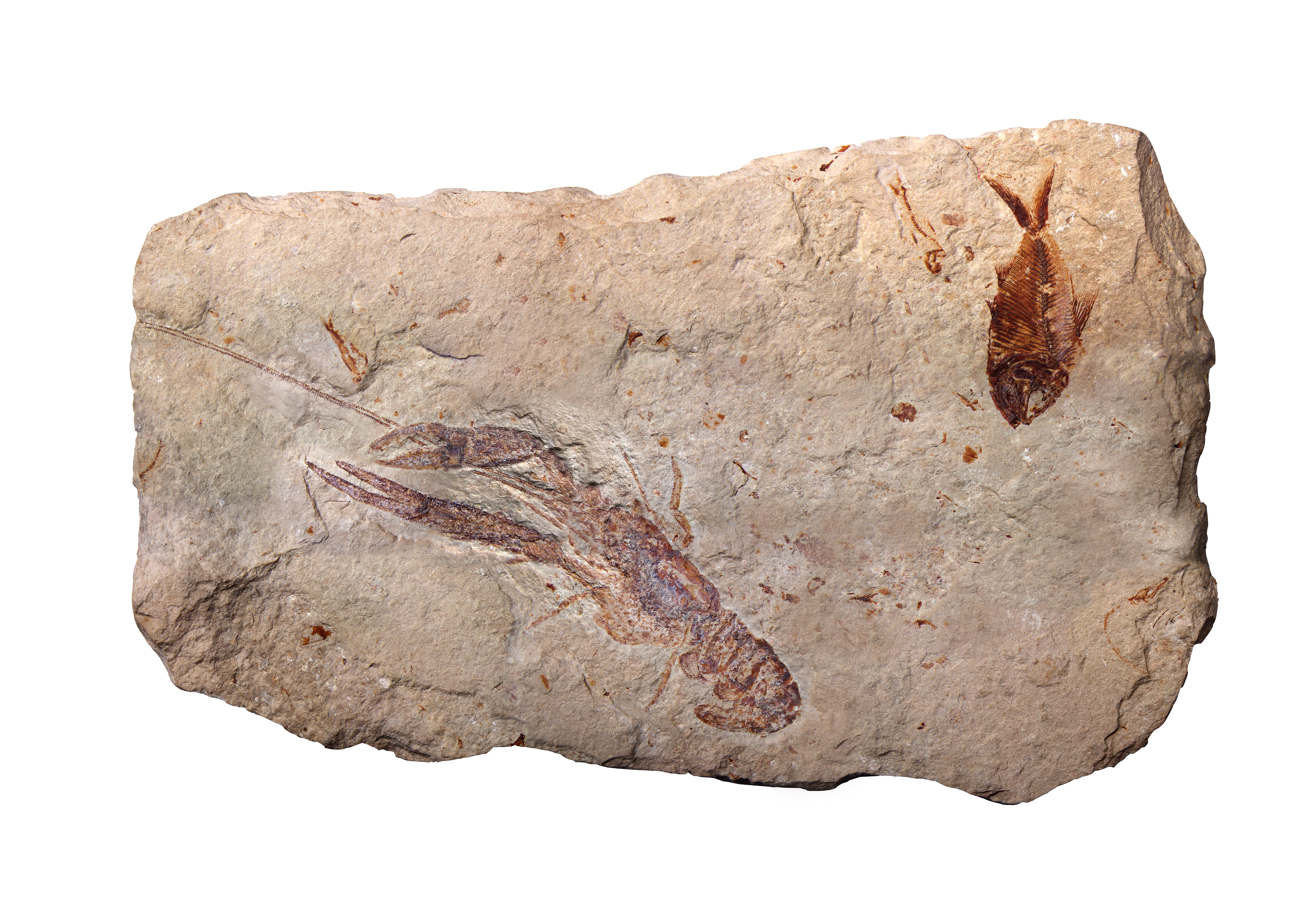
A plate with Nematonotus sp., Pseudostacus sp. and a partial Dercetis triqueter, found in Hakel, Lebanon

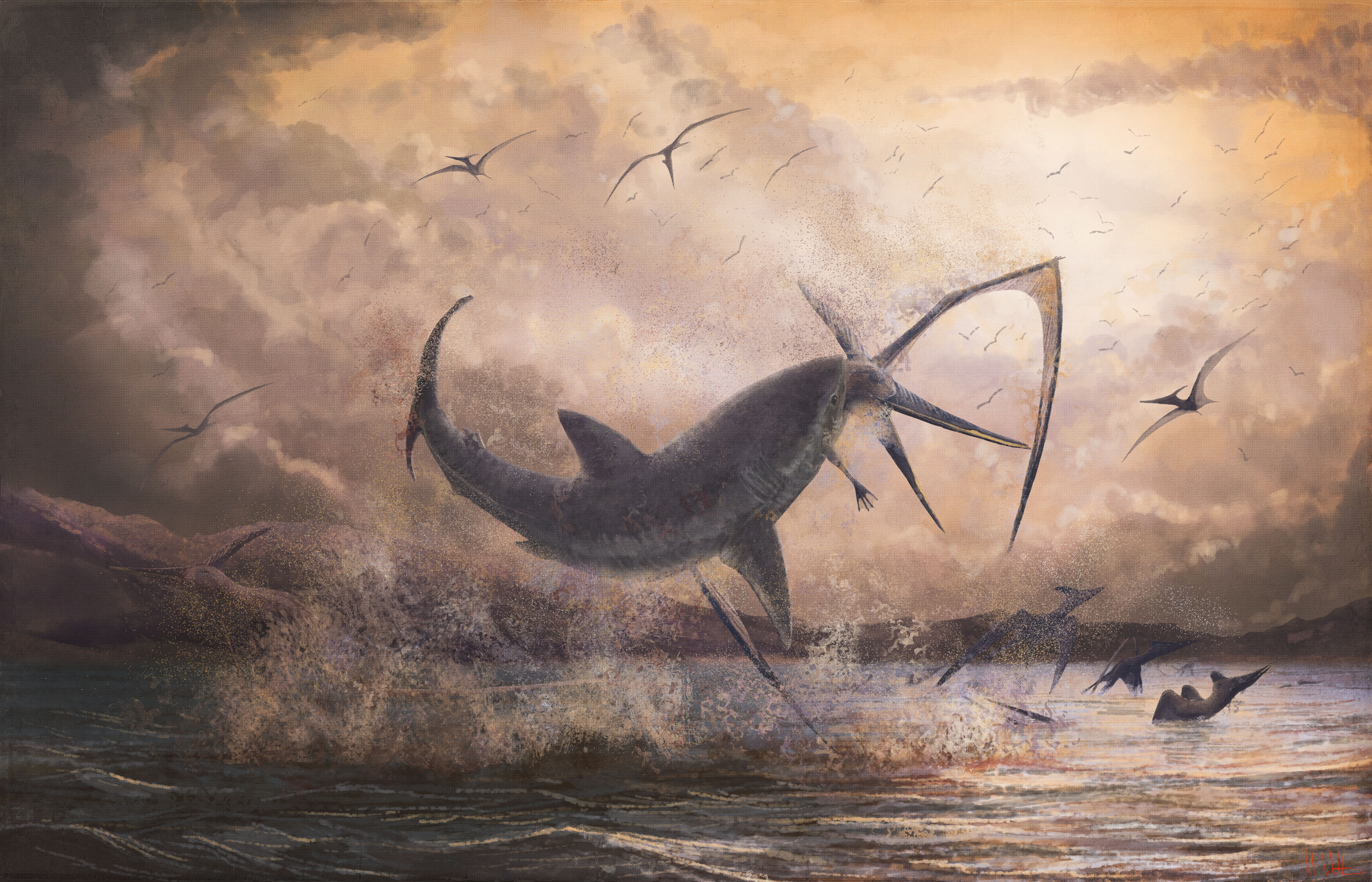
Cretoxyrhina, one of the largest Cretaceous sharks, attacking a Pteranodon in the Western Interior Seaway

== See also ==
- Cretaceous-Paleogene extinction
- Cretaceous Thermal Maximum
- List of fossil sites (with link directory)
- South Polar region of the Cretaceous
