= Iron superoxide dismutase =

Enzyme that catalyses reduction of superoxides

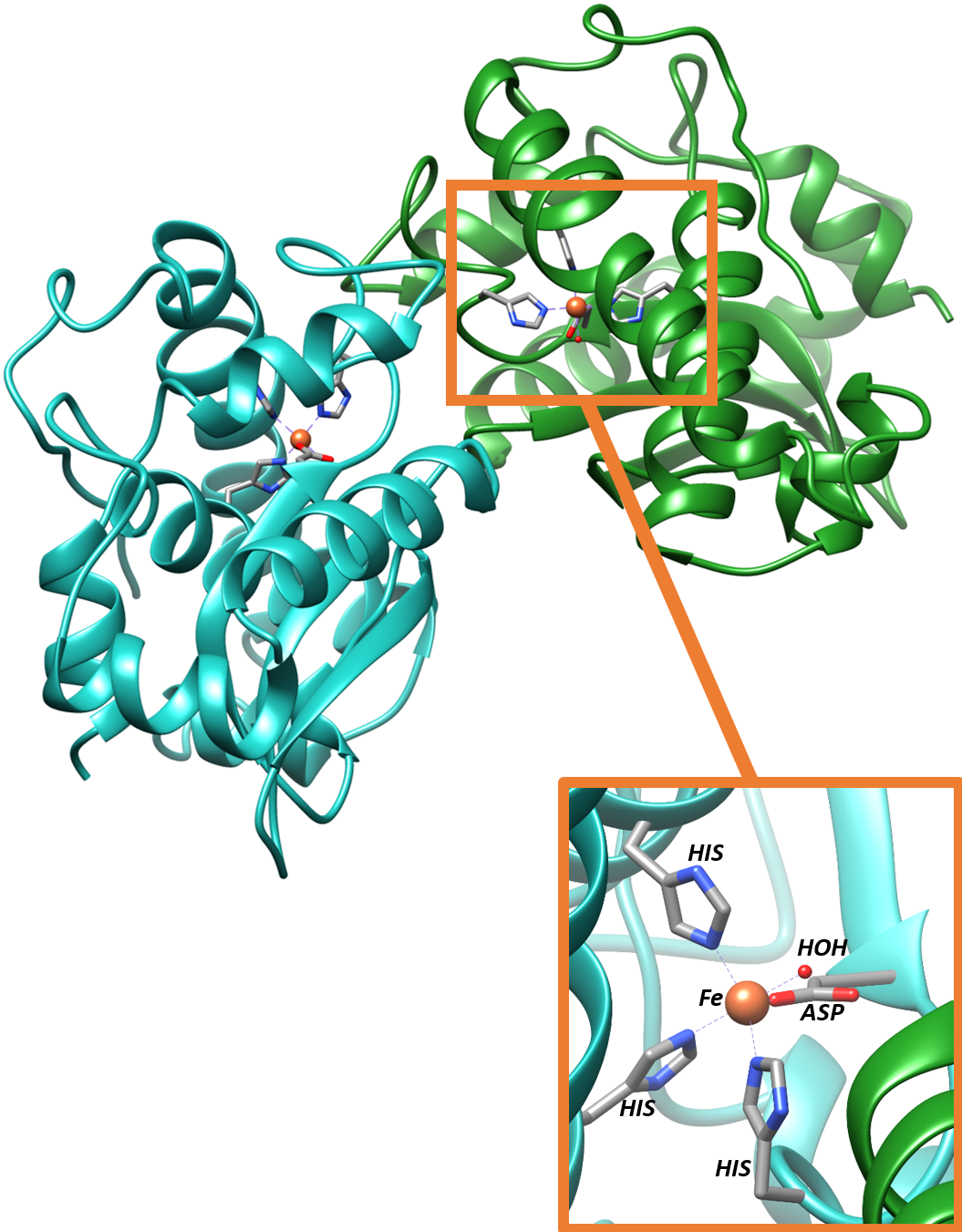
- Iron superoxide dismutase, with the active site in the inset.

Identifiers
- EC no.: 1.15.1.1
- CAS no.: 9054-89-1
- Alt. names: FeSOD

Databases
- BRENDA: enzyme data
- ExPASy: NiceZyme view
- KEGG: enzyme entry
- MetaCyc: metabolic pathway
- Rhea: reactions
- PDB structures: RCSB PDB PDBe PDBsum
Search
- PMC: articles
- PubMed: articles
- NCBI: proteins

Iron superoxide dismutase (FeSOD) is a metalloenzyme that belongs to the superoxide dismutases family of enzymes. Like other superoxide dismutases, it catalyses the dismutation of superoxides into diatomic oxygen and hydrogen peroxide. Found primarily in prokaryotes such as Escherichia coli and present in all strict anaerobes, examples of FeSOD have also been isolated from eukaryotes, such as Vigna unguiculata.

Found within the cytosol, mitochondria, and chloroplasts, FeSOD's ability to disproportionate superoxides provides cells with protection against oxidative stress and other processes that produce superoxides such as photosynthesis. It is important for organisms to disproportionate superoxides, as superoxides themselves are not particularly harmful but have the potential to turn into a hydroxyl radical, which is unable to be eliminated in an enzymatic reaction.

== History ==
FeSOD was first isolated from E. coli by Yost et al. in 1973 and was the third discovery in the family of bacterial superoxide dismutases, with copper-zinc superoxide dismutase being discovered in 1969 and FeSOD's structural equivalent, manganese superoxide dismutase (MnSOD), being discovered in 1970. The fourth, nickel superoxide dismutase, was first isolated in 1996.

Along with being one of the oldest enzymes known, FeSOD is the oldest known superoxide dismutase due to the high bioavailability of iron during the Archean eon. FeSOD first appeared in photoferrotrophic bacteria, then later in cyanobacteria as the Great Oxidation Event locked up much of the free iron in iron oxides and increased the need for cyanobacteria to have reactive oxygen species defences.

== Structure ==
FeSOD is a structural homolog of MnSOD, although there are minor differences in eukaryotic FeSOD, such as a loop connecting the β1 and β2 strands within the enzyme. FeSOD can also exist in homodimeric or homotetrameric forms, depending on the organism.

== Mechanism ==
Like its structural homolog MnSOD, FeSOD disproportionates superoxide via the transport of a single electron by the Fe^{2+}/Fe^{3+} redox couple. There are two separate reactions by which FeSOD can process superoxide:

- Fe^{3+}-SOD + O^{−}_{2} → Fe^{2+}-SOD + O_{2}
- Fe^{2+}-SOD + O^{−}_{2} + 2H^{+} →Fe^{3+}-SOD + H_{2}O_{2}

In order for the superoxide to be disproportionated, however, it must first be protonated. The delivery of the proton is believed to be an H_{2}O ligand, the transport of which is mediated by a local glutamine from ambient water within the cell.
