= Cretaceous resinous interval =

Period of time of increased resin production

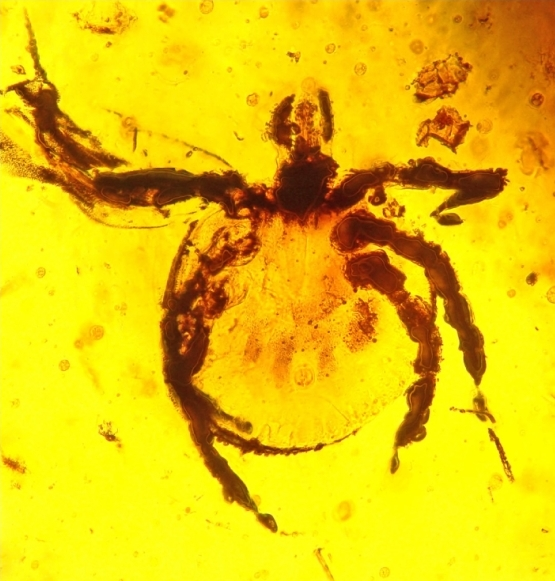
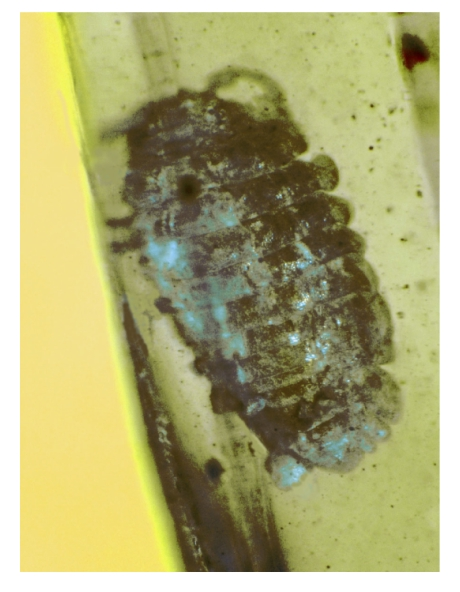
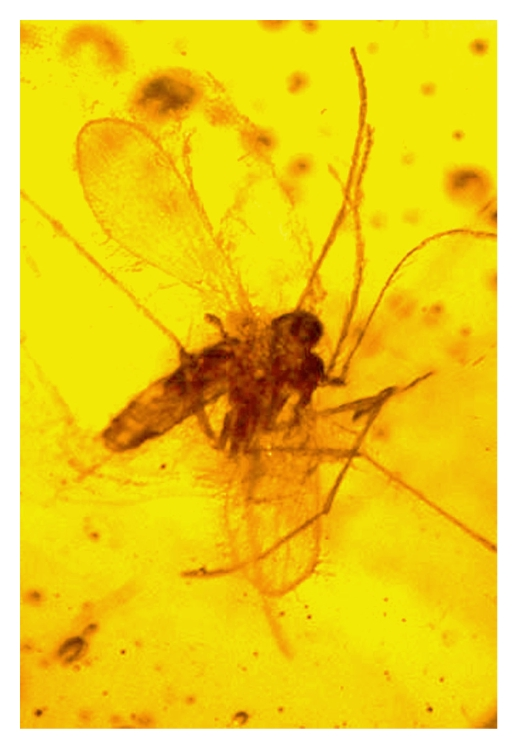
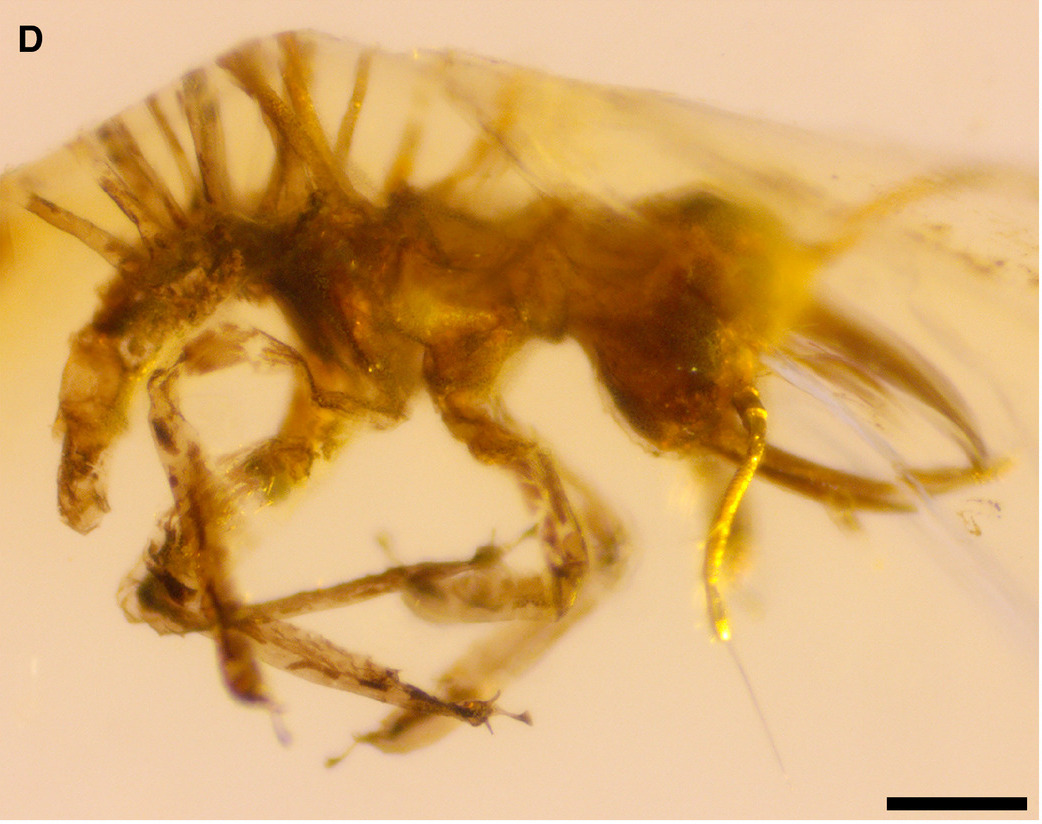
Various specimens preserved in Cretaceous amber. From left to right, top down: Cornupalpatum burmanicum, an isopod, Palaeomyia burmitis, and Tragichrysa ovoruptora.

The Cretaceous Resinous Interval (CREI) was a period of time when there was a high rate of resin production, creating large deposits of amber. It occurred during the Cretaceous period for about 54 million years, from the Barremian to the Campanian ages. The cause was a mix of both living and environmental factors. High temperatures from volcanic activity and increased carbon dioxide (CO_{2}) levels fueling large storms and wildfires caused ice to be absent from the poles and favored the growth of resin-producing forest at high latitudes.

While there is a preservation bias toward amber deposits being better preserved in the Northern Hemisphere, it is suspected that this was a global phenomenon. The overrepresentation of amber deposits in the Northern Hemisphere compared to the Southern Hemisphere makes amber deposits found in the latter during this time valuable for reconstructing the palaeobiology and biodiversity of forests on Gondwana.

== Causes ==
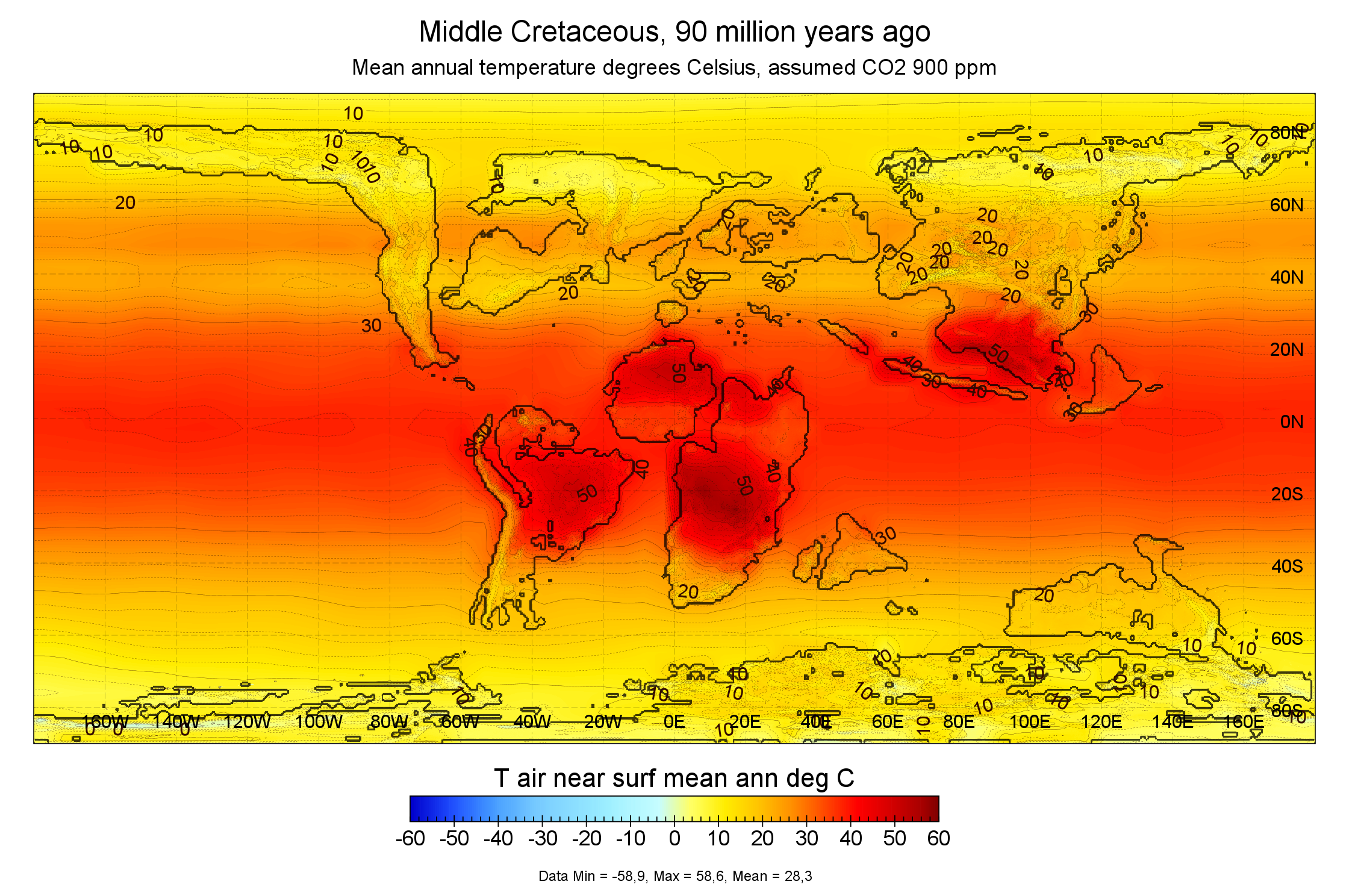
Map of annual temperature (°C) during the Cretaceous (~90 million years ago)

The cause of the Cretaceous Resinous Interval was complex, involving both abiotic and biotic factors. The extent to which each of these factors was relevant during this time period is still being studied, and likely requires a multidisciplinary approach. The environment played a large role during the Cretaceous period. The global average temperature during this period was higher due to increased volcanic activity and carbon dioxide levels, causing ice to be absent on the poles. This allowed the development of forests to occur at higher latitudes. Heavy rainfall also favored the development of forests at higher altitudes with higher rates of resin production. Increased rates of wildfires, storms, and hurricanes causing damage to trees increase the amount of resin as well.

Biotic factors played a large role during this time as well. The high temperatures and humidity during this time caused pathogenic activity. Damage to the plants caused by arthropod species was a major factor in the production of resin. Resin also produces insect-attracting compounds, which may explain the large amount of bioinclusions.

== History ==
Evidence of amber deposits has been found as far back as the Carboniferous period, but it was scarce, only appearing in small quantities and, save for some Triassic amber deposits, has not yielded macroscopic bioinclusions. The Cretaceous Resinous Interval began roughly 125 million years ago, during the Barremian age. It would last for another ~54 million years, before ending in the Campanian age around 72 million years ago. Amber after the interval, during the Maastrichtian age, was widely distributed across the world, but scarce, appearing in small amounts and rarely yielding any bioinclusions.
