= Aptian-Albian Cold Snap =

Period of cool climate during the Early Cretaceous

The Aptian-Albian Cold Snap (AACS) was an interval of cool climate during the late Aptian and early Albian stages of the Early Cretaceous epoch. It began about 118 Ma and ended approximately 111 Ma. It has been speculated that an ice age developed during this cool interval.

== Effects ==
Based on δ^{18}O palaeothermometry, global mean surface temperatures during the AACS were about 20.7 °C. There is some evidence that an ice age occurred during the AACS, as glacial dropstones dating to the AACS have been found in sediments deposited in what was then the western Tethys Ocean. In the Cedar Mountain Formation of Utah, the AACS is associated with a decrease in organic sedimentation in Lake Carpenter reflecting a drying trend. Mean annual air temperatures in northwestern China, located in the mid-latitudes, were about 15 °C. Furthermore, δ^{18}O palaeothermometry from the Cloverly Formation suggests that relatively cool temperatures persisted for some time after the AACS before a pulse of warming in the late Albian that led to the development of the Middle Cretaceous Hothouse.

During the AACS, chondrodont bivalves have been observed to have colonised carbonate ramps in areas such as the Aralar carbonate platform.
