= Bioavailability (soil) =

Bioavailability, in environmental and soil sciences, represents the amount of an element or compound that is accessible to an organism for uptake or adsorption across its cellular membrane. In environmental and agricultural applications, bioavailability most often refers to availability of contaminants, such as organic pollutants or heavy metals, in soil systems and is also used frequently in determining potential risk of land application of sewage sludge or other inorganic/organic waste materials.

Almost exclusively, plant roots and soil organisms uptake contaminants that are dissolved in water. Therefore, the bioavailable fraction is often likened to the dissolved (aqueous) fraction in these systems. Depending on its chemical properties, a contaminant may or may not be found in the aqueous phase. Organic contaminants may become sorbed or sequestered in organic matter through weak Van der Waals interactions or through hydrogen- or covalent bonding. Ionic compounds, such as heavy metals, can be precipitated into the solid phase. Volatile compounds can be lost as aerosols to the soil atmosphere. In these forms, contaminants are relatively inaccessible to microbial or plant uptake and must dissociate and re-dissolve into the soil solution to become biological available.

== Factors influencing soil bioavailability ==
Bioavailability is a function of soil properties, time, environmental conditions, and plant and microbial characteristics

- Soil properties, such as pH, ion exchange capacity, soil organic matter content, texture and porosity influence bioavailability. Because soils with higher ion exchange and organic matter content offer more opportunities for adsorption, typically they exhibit lower bioavailability.
- As the contact time between the contaminant and soil increases, a decrease in bioavailability is observed, termed “ageing”, due to diffusion and sorption processes with mineral and organic fractions of soil.
- Environmental conditions influence bioavailability. Drought conditions result in lower soil water content. This can reduce the access of plants and organisms to dissolved contaminants but also can enhance precipitation of salts from solution.

== Measuring bioavailability in soil ecosystems ==
Site-specific characteristics have a major influence on contaminant bioavailability and no standardized tests have been developed. However, there are a number of chemical and biological tests used to estimate bioavailability including a direct measurement of contaminant bioaccumulation in earthworms (Eisenia fetida). Estimates of bioavailability can also be obtained from chemical solid-phase soil extractions. Fugacity modelling of bioavailability is based on the solubility and partitioning of compounds into aqueous and non-aqueous phases. This model describes the tendency for contaminants to be dissolved in the soil solution.
